= List of ecoregions of New Zealand =

This is a list of ecoregions of New Zealand as defined by the World Wide Fund for Nature.

Tropical and subtropical moist broadleaf forests

- Kermadec Islands subtropical moist forests

Temperate broadleaf and mixed forests

- Chatham Islands temperate forests
- Fiordland temperate forests
- Nelson Coast temperate forests
- North Island temperate forests
- Northland temperate kauri forests
- Rakiura Island temperate forests
- Richmond temperate forests
- Southland temperate forests
- Westland temperate forests

Temperate grasslands, savannas, and shrublands

- Canterbury–Otago tussock grasslands

Montane grasslands and shrublands

- Southland montane grasslands

Tundra

- Antipodes Subantarctic Islands tundra
