= Southland montane grasslands =

Terrestrial ecoregion in New Zealand

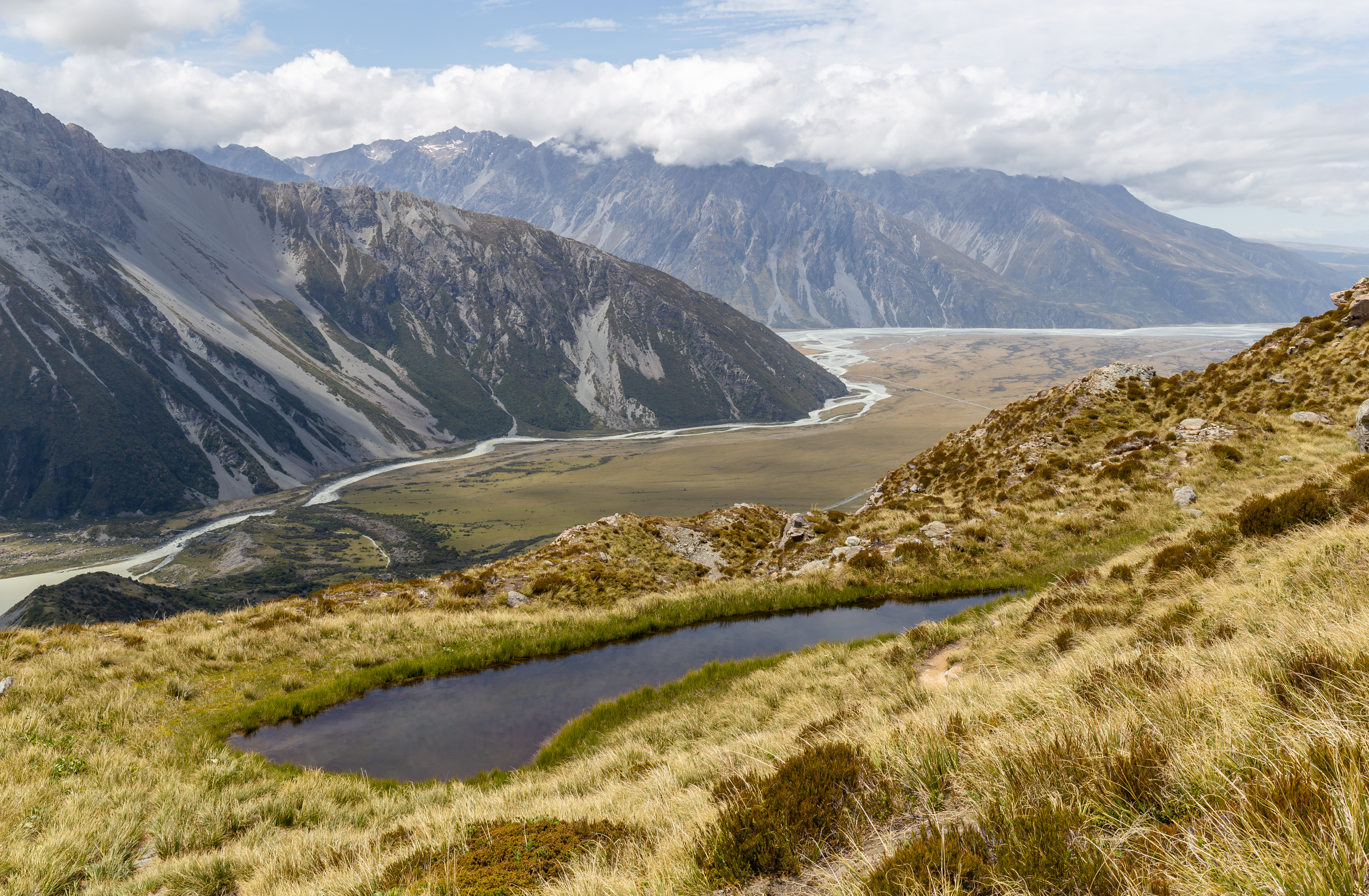
- Sealy Tarns in Aoraki / Mount Cook National Park

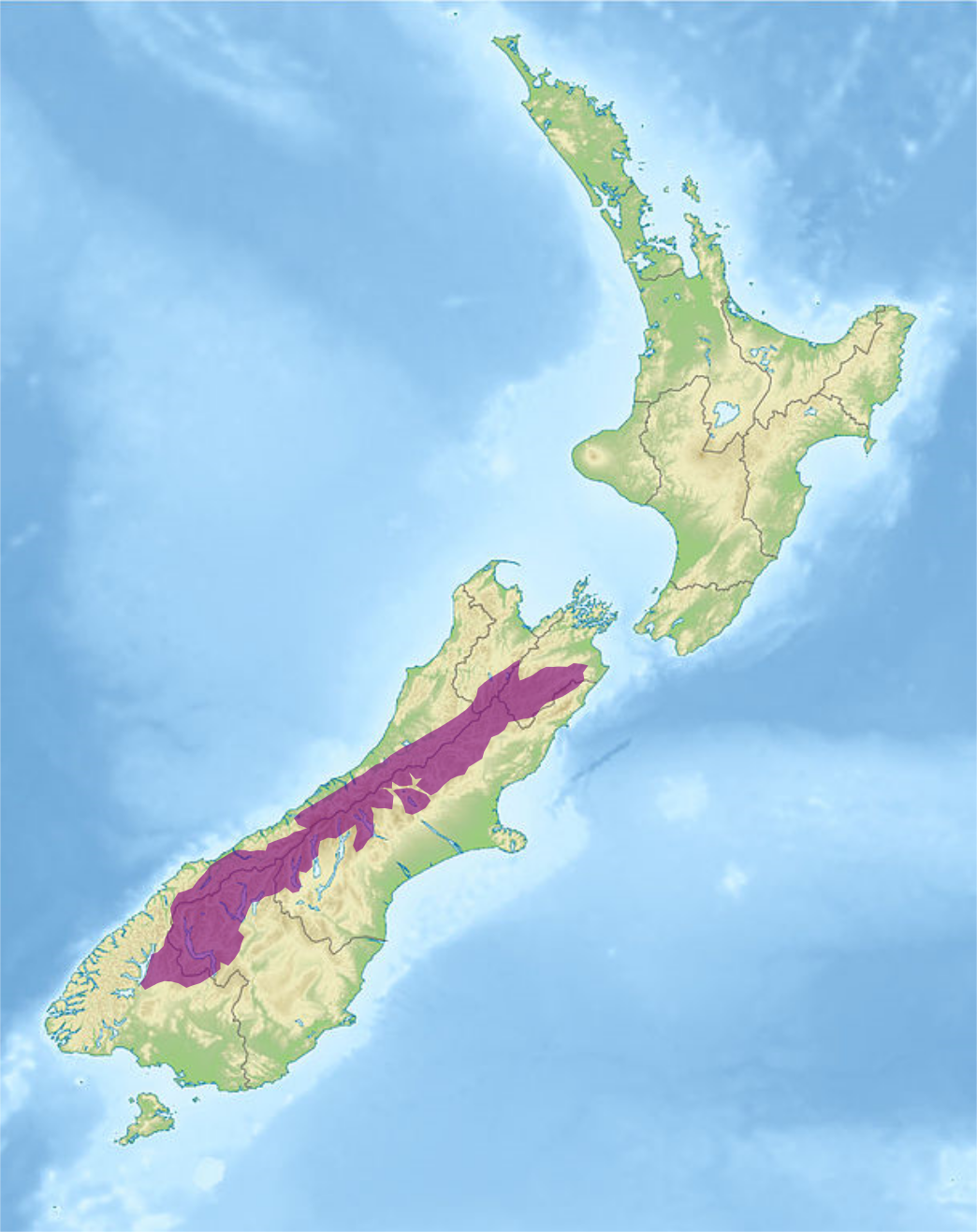
- Ecoregion territory (in purple)

Ecology
- Realm: Australasian
- Biome: Montane grasslands and shrublands
- Borders: List: Canterbury–Otago tussock grasslands; Fiordland temperate forests; Nelson Coast temperate forests; Richmond temperate forests; Southland temperate forests; Westland temperate forests

Geography
- Area: 40,006 km^{2} (15,446 sq mi)
- Country: New Zealand
- Regions: Canterbury; Marlborough; Otago; Southland; Tasman, West Coast
- Coordinates: 43.55°S 170.3°E

Conservation
- Conservation status: Relatively stable/intact
- Protected: 2,035 km² (5%)

The Southland montane grasslands, also known as the South Island montane grasslands, is a montane grasslands and shrublands ecoregion on New Zealand’s South Island. The ecoregion covers the middle portion of the Southern Alps, and includes extensive alpine grasslands, fellfields, and montane forests.

== Geography ==
The Southern Alps extend for 500 km, running northeast–southwest down the length of the South Island. Aoraki/Mount Cook (3,754 m), New Zealand's highest peak, is in the Southern Alps. Rainfall is high along the western slope of the mountains, while the eastern slopes are generally drier.

== Flora ==
Alpine grassland, also known as tussock herbfield, is the dominant plant community in the ecoregion. Alpine grasslands grow above the treeline at approximately 1200 meters elevation. Tussock grasses, mostly of genus Chionochloa, are characteristic. These grasses are mostly long-lived slow-growing perennials. The broadleaved snow tussock (Chionochloa flavescens) and Chionochloa pallens are common on young and well-drained soils, and C. rigida is more common on the drier eastern side of the mountains. The smaller curled snow tussock (C. crassiuscula) becomes prevalent at higher altitudes. Herbaceous perennial plants are interspersed with the tussock grasses, including speargrasses (Aciphylla spp.), sedges (Carex spp.) and Ranunculus buttercups, notably Ranunculus lyallii, the world's largest buttercup.

Montane forests of southern beech (Nothofagus) grow below the treeline. Mountain beech (Nothofagus solandri cliffortoides) is common on steep hillsides, and evergreen silver beech (Nothofagus menziesii) and red beech (N. fusca) are prevalent in valleys and lower hillsides. On the western slopes, mixed silver beech–podocarp forests and podocarp–southern rata (Metrosideros umbellata) forests are common. The transition from montane Nothofagus forest to alpine grassland is generally abrupt. In the west, a belt of dense woody shrubs, including Dracophyllum traversii, forms a more gradual transition between the montane forests and alpine grasslands. The shrubs snow tōtara (Podocarpus nivalis), Hebe spp., and Coprosma spp. grow near the tree-line.

== Fauna ==
The ecoregion is home to several of New Zealand's endemic birds, including the New Zealand rock wren (Xenicus gilviventris), kea (Nestor notabalis), great spotted kiwi (Apteryx haastii), and southern subspecies of New Zealand kaka (Nestor meridionalis meridionalis).

== Protected areas ==
A 2017 assessment found that 12,035 km^{2}, or 5%, of the ecoregion is in protected areas. Protected areas include Eyre Mountains/Taka Ra Haka Conservation Park, Mavora Lakes Stewardship Area, Mount Aspiring National Park, Nelson Lakes National Park, Westland Tai Poutini National Park, Arthur's Pass National Park, Aoraki / Mount Cook National Park, Craigieburn Forest Conservation Park, and Adams Wilderness Area.

== See also ==
- Tussock grasslands of New Zealand
