= Tussock grasslands of New Zealand =

Landscape form in New Zealand

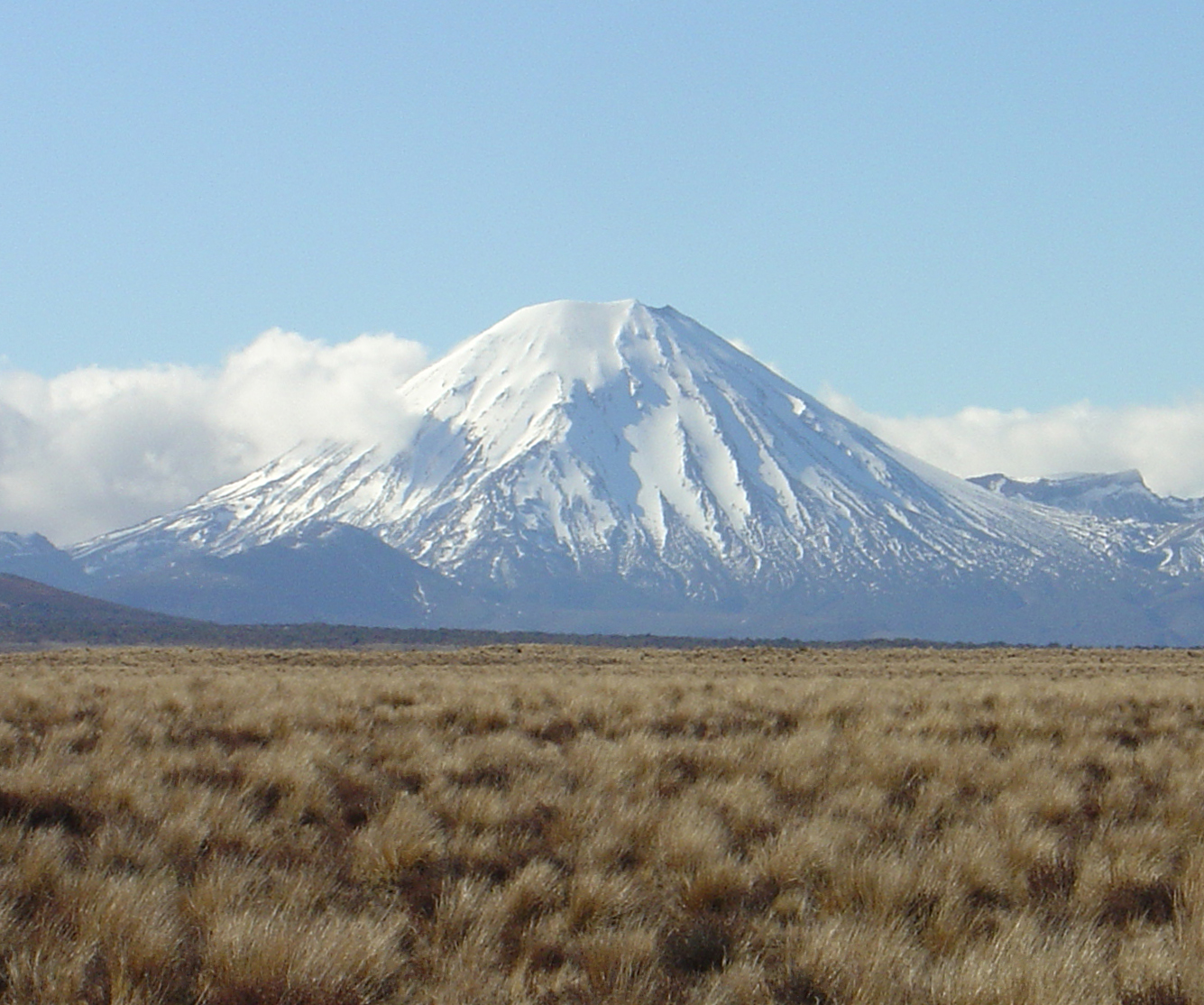
Tussock near Mount Ngauruhoe on the Central Plateau

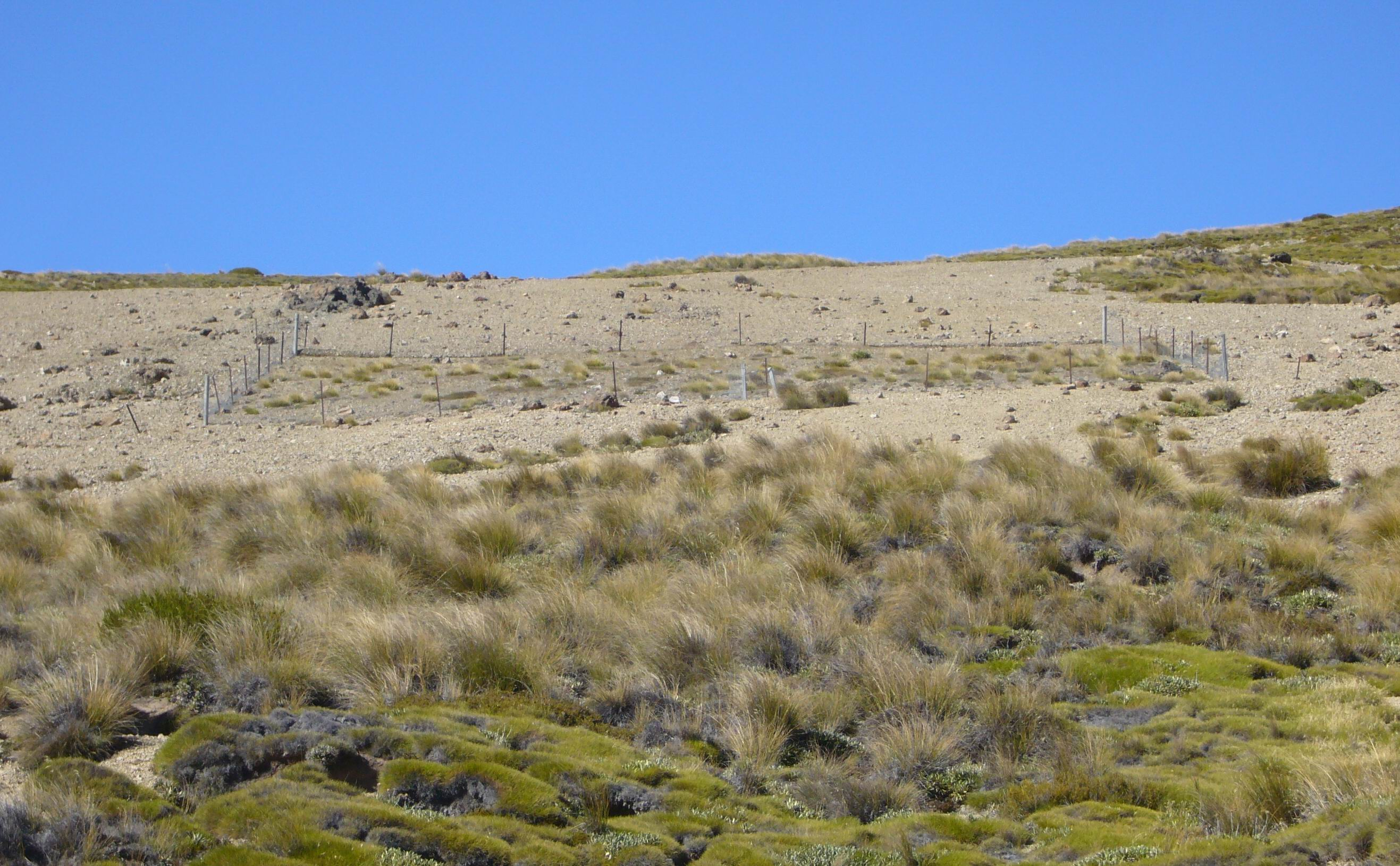
Exclusion plot on Island Saddle in the South Island. The enclosure prevents herbivory by introduced mammals resulting in a higher recruitment of tussocks within the plot.

Tussock grasslands form expansive and distinctive landscapes in the South Island and, to a lesser extent, in the Central Plateau region of the North Island of New Zealand. Most of the plants referred to as tussocks are in the genera Chionochloa, Festuca, and Poa, also Carex.

What would be termed "herbfields" for European mountains, and bunchgrass meadows in North America, are referred to as tussock herbfields in New Zealand due to a dominance of this type of plant. Species of the genus Chionochloa dominate in these areas. The larger tussocks are called snow grass (or less commonly snow tussocks) and may grow up to 2 metres (6 ft 7 in) in height. They grow slowly and some specimens are estimated to be several centuries old.

== See also ==
- Canterbury–Otago tussock grasslands
- Southland montane grasslands
- Environment of New Zealand
