= Caucasus–Anatolian–Hyrcanian temperate forest =

The Caucasus-Anatolian-Hyrcanian temperate forests is a composite ecoregion of southern Europe and West Asia, designated by the World Wildlife Fund as one of their Global 200 ecoregions, a list of priority ecoregions for conservation.

== Ecoregion ==
This ecoregion encompasses six terrestrial ecoregions between and close to the Black and the Caspian seas, all of which have been assessed by the WWF as Critical/Endangered. Efforts are underway to improve biodiversity status in the composite ecoregion, including measures to conserve Key Biodiversity Areas and establish connectivity between them.

== Location ==
These forests include temperate coniferous forests, temperate broadleaf and mixed forests, and montane forest steppes covering several high mountain ranges of Western Asia, including the Caucasus, Lesser Caucasus, Pontic Mountains, Alborz, and Kopet Dag, which stretch from Bulgaria in the west to Turkmenistan in the east, encompassing portions of Bulgaria, Turkey, Georgia, Russia, Armenia, Azerbaijan, Iran, and Turkmenistan. The terrestrial ecoregions included within the larger ecoregion include:

- Caspian Hyrcanian mixed forests (Azerbaijan, Iran)
- Caucasus mixed forests (Armenia, Azerbaijan, Georgia, Russia, Turkey)
- Elburz Range forest steppe (Iran)
- Euxine-Colchic deciduous forests (Bulgaria, Georgia, Turkey)
- Kopet Dag woodlands and forest steppe (Iran, Turkmenistan)
- Northern Anatolian conifer and deciduous forests (Turkey)

== Gallery ==
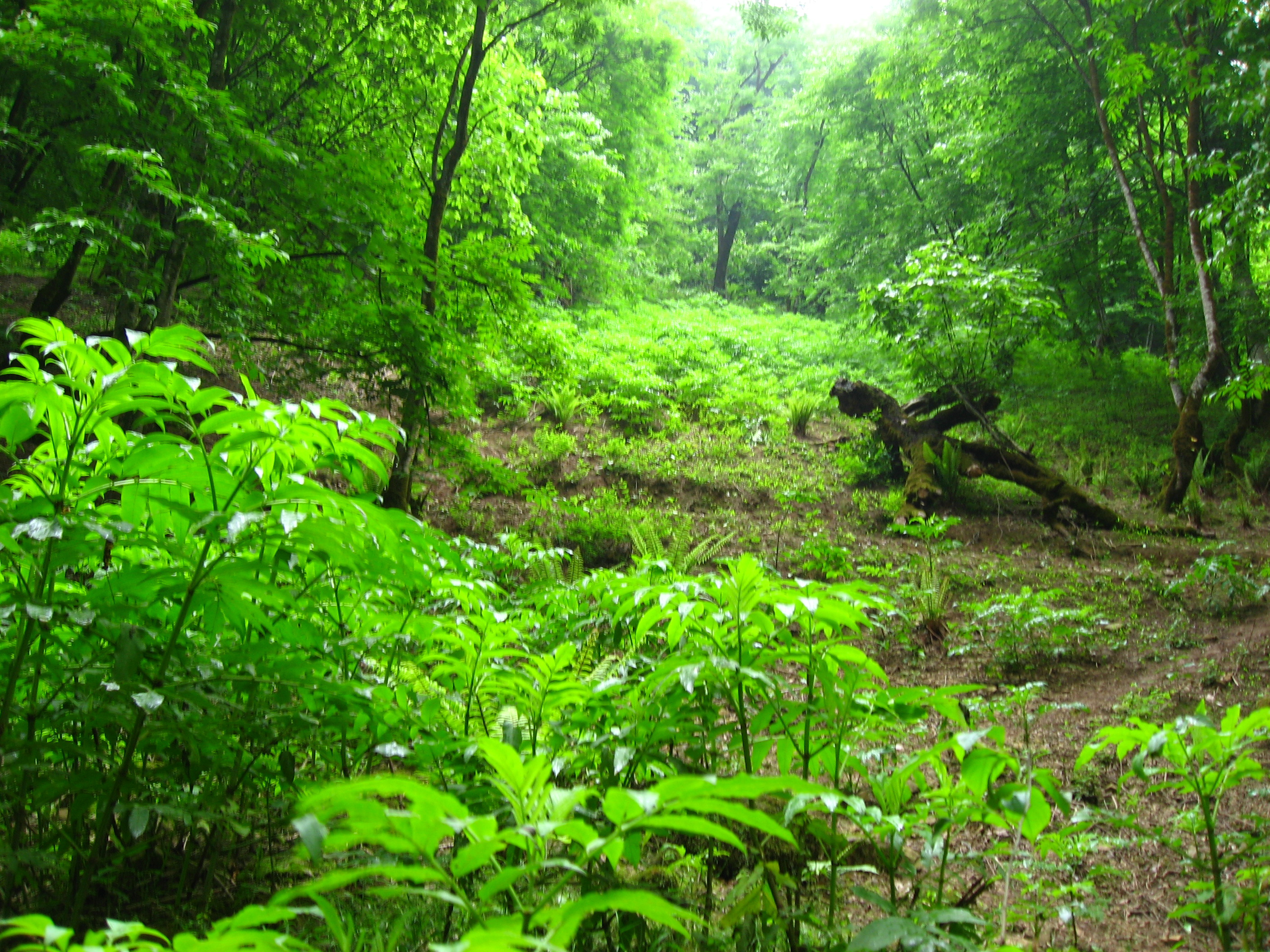
Jungles of Iran

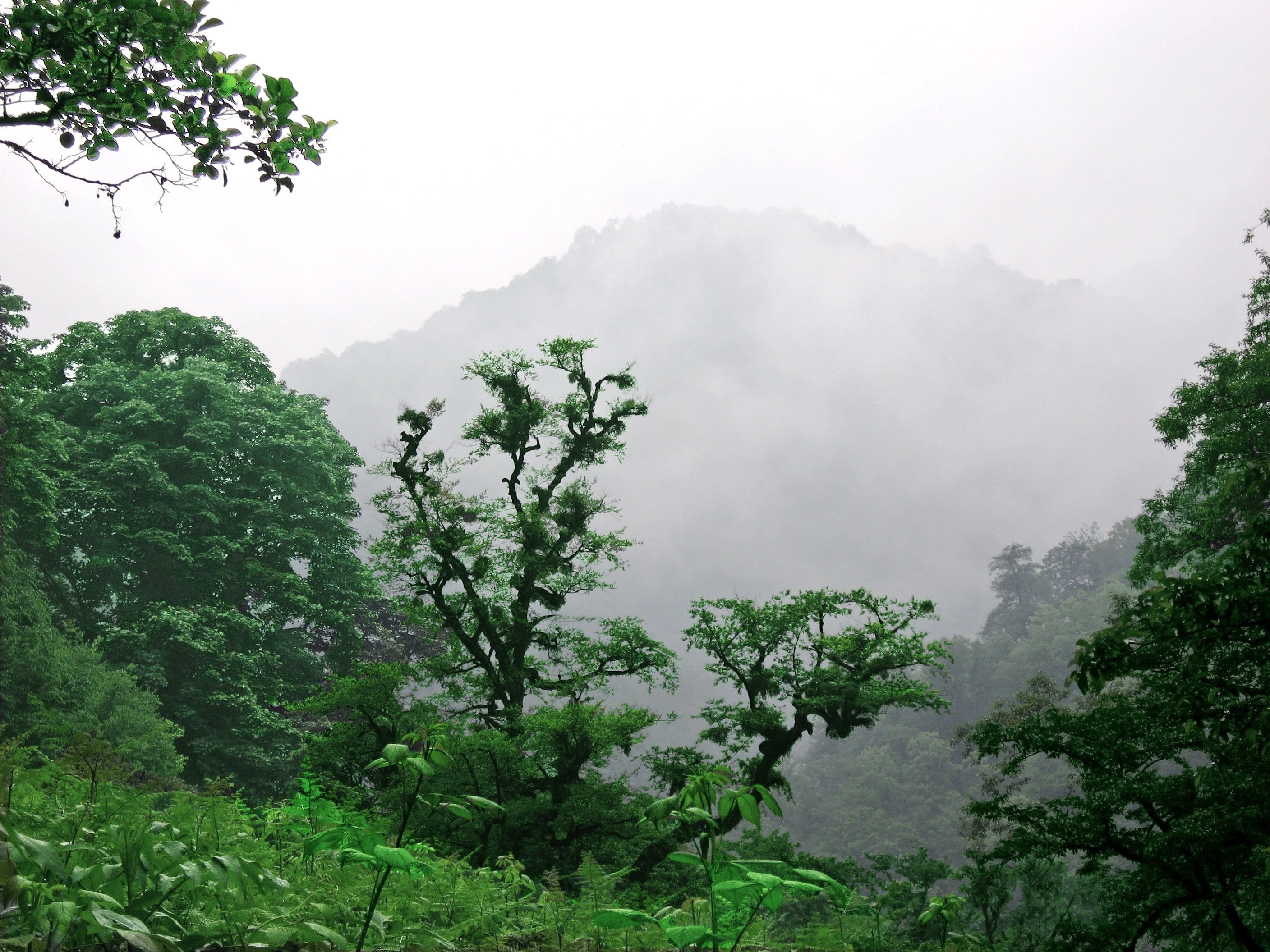
Jungles of Iran, Gilan
