= Richmond temperate forests =

Ecoregion in New Zealand

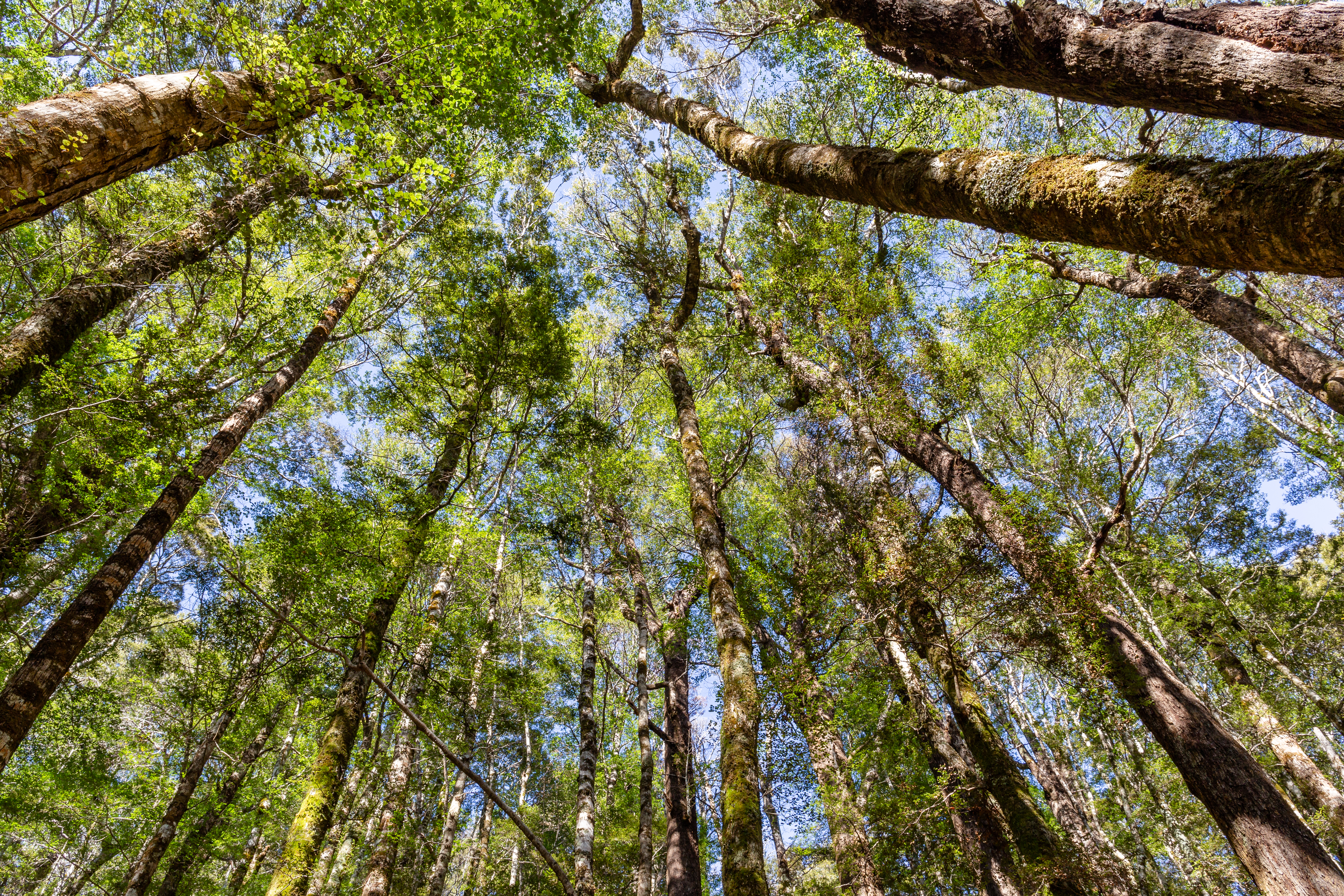
- Silver beech (Nothofagus menziesii) in Nelson Lakes National Park

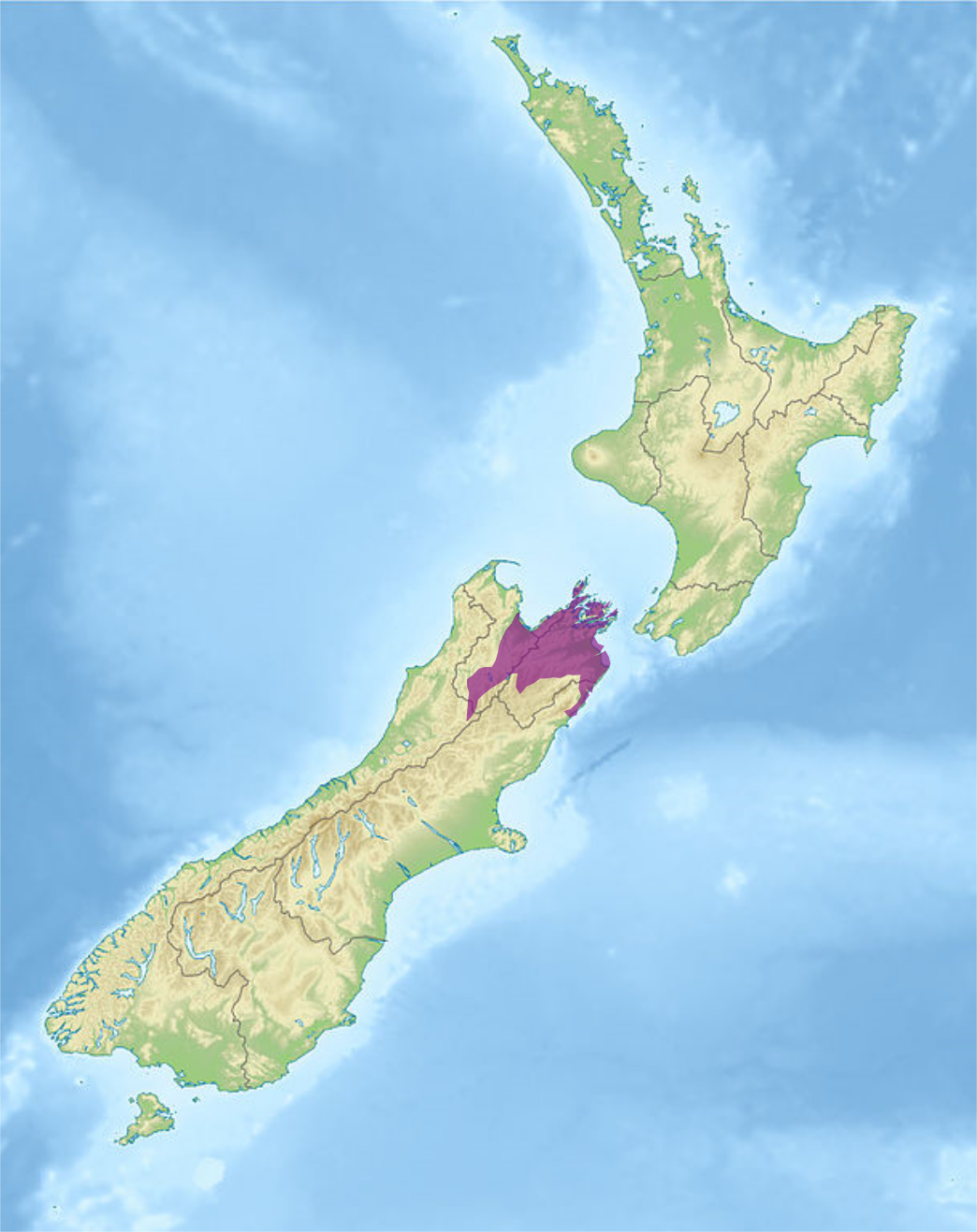
- Ecoregion territory (in purple)

Ecology
- Realm: Australasian
- Biome: temperate broadleaf and mixed forests
- Borders: Canterbury-Otago tussock grasslands; Nelson Coast temperate forests, Southland montane grasslands

Geography
- Area: 12,836 km^{2} (4,956 sq mi)
- Country: New Zealand
- Regions: Canterbury; Marlborough, Tasman
- Coordinates: 41.6°S 173.5°E

Conservation
- Protected: 4,836 km² (38%)

The Richmond temperate forests is an ecoregion covering the northern part of New Zealand's South Island.

== Location and description ==
This area includes the mountain valleys of the Kaikōura Ranges with its high peak at the 2880-metre Mount Tapuaenuku, while to the south lies the beech-covered Spencer Range, and to the north and east lies open land running down to the Marlborough Sounds at the tip of the island. The wide valleys of the Wairau and Awatere rivers divide the region.

The climate is characterised by a hot summer and a cold, dry winter.

== Flora ==
The native flora of this north country is Nothofagus beech forest with red beech (Nothofagus fusca) and silver beech (N. menziesii) in the lower, warmer, more fertile areas and hard beech (N. truncata) in the more exposed areas. Notable plants include the sedge Carex uncifolia.

== Fauna ==
The black-eyed gecko (Hoplodactylus kahutarae), New Zealand’s only alpine gecko is endemic to the north of South island, which is also home to the vulnerable scree skink (Oligosoma waimatense) and four species of giant wētā including Kaikoura giant wētā (Deinacrida parva) and the Kaikoura Ranges wētā (Deinacrida elegans). The islands in the Marlborough Sounds have more endemic species of their own.

== Threats and preservation ==
There are a number of protected areas along the Marlborough Sounds (on the islands in particular) and inland in the Nelson Lakes National Park and Mount Richmond Forest Park.
