= Ecoregion conservation status =

Measure used in conservation biology

Conservation status is a measure used in conservation biology to assess an ecoregion's degree of habitat alteration and habitat conservation. It is used to set priorities for conservation.

Ecoregion Conservation Status refers to the assessment and categorization of the ecological health, biodiversity, and threats faced by distinct geographic areas. This assessment plays a crucial role in setting priorities for conservation efforts. An ecoregion, characterized by a combination of climate, geology, topography, and ecosystems, embodies unique natural landscapes and is assessed based on the criteria of habitat loss, fragmentation, and protection. The goal of ecoregion conservation is to acknowledge all private and public conservation areas that safeguard the full biological diversity of an ecoregion. The evaluation of such criteria puts the classification of ecoregions into various categories to inform the need for conservation interventions. This status of ecoregions is necessary for early warning signs, to identify struggling regions before the large loss of biodiversity. This also develops initiatives aimed at sustainable living to enhance all ecoregions in the world.

Key contributors to research towards conservation efforts of ecoregions include The International Union for Conservation of Nature (ICUN) and The World Wildlife Fund (WWF), as well as many others.

== Manner of Application ==
=== The Word Wildlife Fund ===
World Wildlife Fund for Nature
- Website: wwf.panda.org worldwildlife.org (US)
- a: Also the WWF's first president.

The WWF contributed to The Global 200, a catalog of high-priority ecoregions and their conservation scale. Ecoregions are broadly classified into three categories: "critical/endangered" (CE), "Vulnerable" (V), or "relatively stable/relatively intact" (RS).

- Critical/Endangered: Facing severe threats, these areas are at high risk of ecological degradation. Urgent assistance is imperative to address issues that include severe rates of deforestation, habitat fragmentation, and loss of biodiversity.
- Vulnerable: With the potential for significant loss of biodiversity, these areas require conservation efforts. They face moderate levels of habitat and biodiversity loss, as well as the potential encroachment of invasive species.
- Stable/Intact: These areas are in relatively good health, showing signs of well-preserved and thriving biodiversity, with minimal habitat loss. While these ecoregions require monitoring, immediate intervention is not needed.

The selection process for the Global 200 is tedious and thorough. The categorization process is extensive and takes into account things like habitat loss, impacts of global warming, and overall biodiversity in each ecoregion. This placement then tells conservationists which section of the world needs attention the most at that specific time. This can help migratory species and help identify invasive species' origin and combat negative impacts on these environments.

- Habitat blocks measures of the size of remaining habitat blocks
- Habitat fragmentation is the degree to which remaining habitat is fragmented, measured as the ratio of the total perimeter of remaining habitat blocks to their total area
- Habitat protection measures the area of remaining habitat in protected areas, and the degree of protection provided (IUCN protected area categories)

=== The International Union for Conservation Nature ===
The ICUN compiled the "Red List", evaluating the global conservation status of species based on the threat level. The list separates species into threat levels ranging from least concern to extinct, aiding in directing efforts to mitigate species decline. This assessment evaluated factors contributing to species extinction like population size, trends, distributions, and threats. This list gives great insight into what the ecoregion conservation status is used for, placing ecoregions into categories inherently explains the failing ecosystem and corresponds to specific species of concern within it.

=== The Nature Conservancy ===
The Nature Conservancy employs a developed strategy for assessing the status of ecoregions in need, via the 5-s Framework. This involves evaluating systems, stresses, and sources of stress, to understand the fall of the ecosystem. Furthermore, categories of success and sources of success are utilized to gauge the pace of improvement. This method of framework aids in identifying conservation targets, understanding degradation, and continuing with effective strategies for the rehabilitation of falling ecoregions.

- Systems: conversation target in a system along with the process to maintain
- Stresses: type of degradation or impairment at a site
- Sources: the agent bringing stress to the system
- Strategies: conservation tactics deployed to help render rehabilitation
- Success: a measure of biodiversity health at the site

=== Ecoregion Conservation Status Example ===
- Map of the Cerrado ecoregion as delineated by the World Wide Fund for Nature.

The Brazilian Cerrado biome is a large ecosystem that can be split into 19 ecoregions, that spans over central Brazil and is home to many animals as well as over 12,000 plant species. The increasing necessity of agricultural land has caused issues for the Central American savannah, causing heavy amounts of chemical fertilizers into the soil. These actions have caused fragmentation, invasive species, soil erosion, water pollution, and loss of biodiversity.

By accessing the decline of vegetation, soil, geology, and biodiversity, many of the ecoregions were scaled into vulnerable and critical classifications, creating a high-priority necessity for conservation intervention. Scientists recently reformatted some of the ecoregion delineations in hopes of creating a more precise plan of action to combat the necessary agricultural progress but the harmful output of dangerous pollution.

== See also ==
- List of global 200 ecoregions
