= North Tibetan Plateau–Kunlun Mountains alpine desert =

Ecoregion in the Tibetan Plateau

North Tibetan Plateau-Kunlun Mountains alpine desert
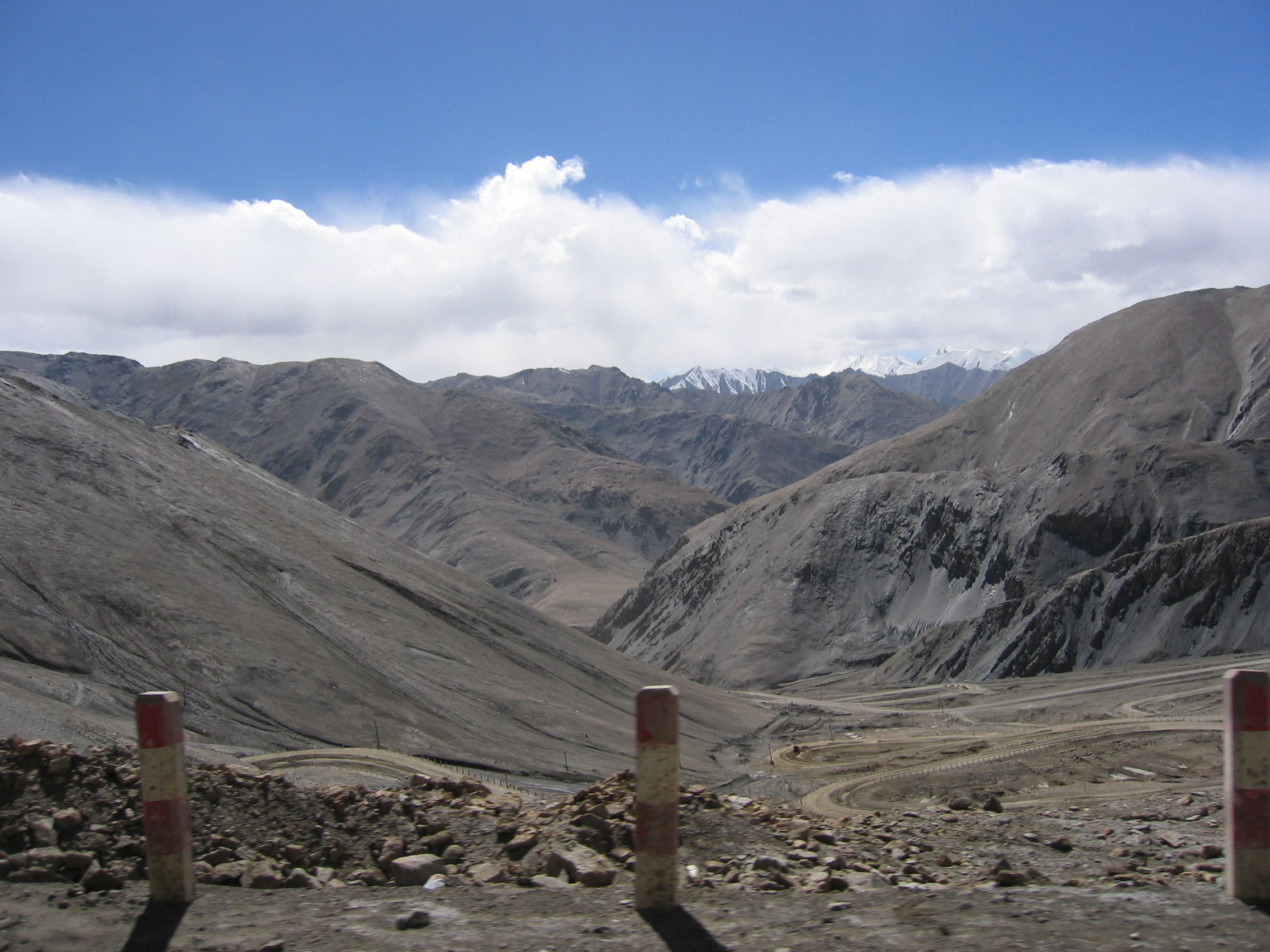
- View of Western Kunlun Shan from the Tibet-Xinjiang highway

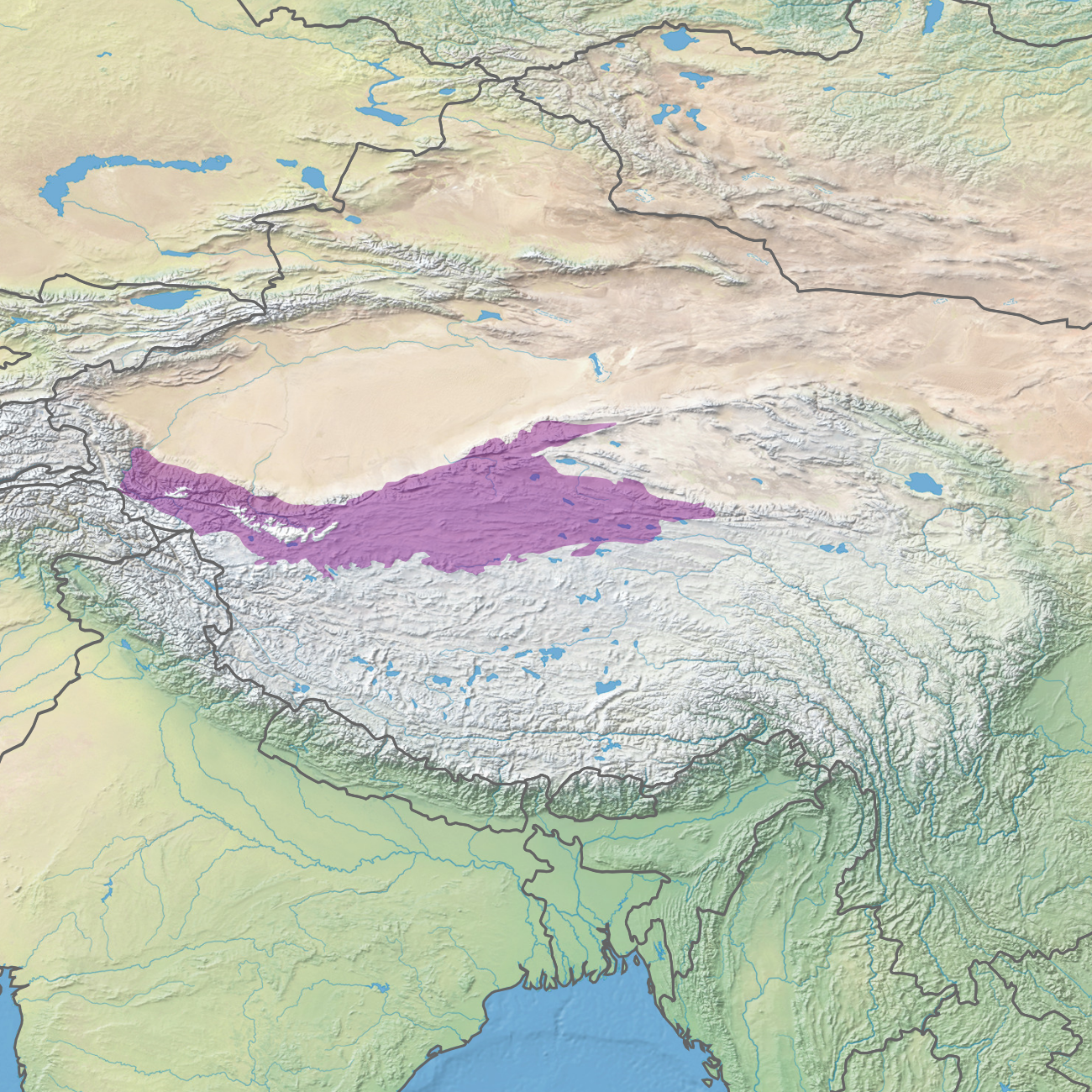
- Ecoregion territory (in purple)

Ecology
- Realm: Palearctic
- Biome: Montane grasslands and shrublands

Geography
- Country: China
- Coordinates: 35°45′N 85°45′E

The North Tibetan Plateau-Kunlun Mountains alpine desert ecoregion (WWF ID: PA1011) covers a long stretch of mostly treeless alpine terrain across the northern edge of the Tibet Plateau. A variety of cold, dry habitats are found, including alpine meadows, steppe, desert, and cushion plant floral areas.

== Location ==
In the northwest, the ecoregion begins at the east edge of the Pamir Mountains, then covers the Kunlun Mountains in the north and the high plateau south to the Karakoram Mountains. From there it follows the Kunlun from west to east across the northern edge of the Tibet Plateau, on the south rim of the arid Tarim Basin. Elevations, higher in the northwest, are mostly above 5,000 meters, and the soils are often salty and barren. The region is dry, cold, and very remote. Permafrost lies under much of the territory. Much of the eastern extension is within the Altun Shan National Nature Reserve.

== Climate ==
The climate of the ecoregion is Tundra climate (Köppen climate classification ET), a local climate in which at least one month has an average temperature high enough to melt snow (0 °C (32 °F)), but no month with an average temperature in excess of 10 °C (50 °F). Precipitation in much of the region is under 50 mm/year. Winds are strong and persistent.

== Flora and fauna ==
The harsh environment supports only specialized plants and animals capable of managing the cold, dry climate. There are very limited stands of Asian spruce (Picea schrenkiana) and juniper shrubs on low, north-facing slopes where they can capture moisture or snow melt. Along riverbeds there are a few plants such as a salt-tolerant form of tamarisk (Myricaria), a woody plant the exists mostly underground. Some slopes below 5,300 meters support a high cold steppe community that features sedges (Carex), purple feathergrass (Stipa purpurea), falcate crazyweed (locoweed) (Oxytropis falcata).

One mammal endemic to the region is the endangered Koslov's pika (Ochotona koslowi). The Koslov's pika is a burrowing lagomorph that lives in dense family communities. The species had been identified in 1884 on the basis of two specimens, then 'lost' for over 100 years until scientists discovered some isolated communities in the Kunlun Mountains.

== Conservation ==
A 2017 estimate of the region approximated 239,046 square kilometers are included in protected areas, including Chang Tang Nature Reserve, the world's third largest nature preserve; Sanjiangyuan; and Altun Shan National Nature Reserve. The Hoh Xil region in western Qinghai province was listed as a UNESCO World Heritage Site.

== See also ==
- List of ecoregions in China
