= Southland temperate forests =

Terrestrial ecoregion in New Zealand

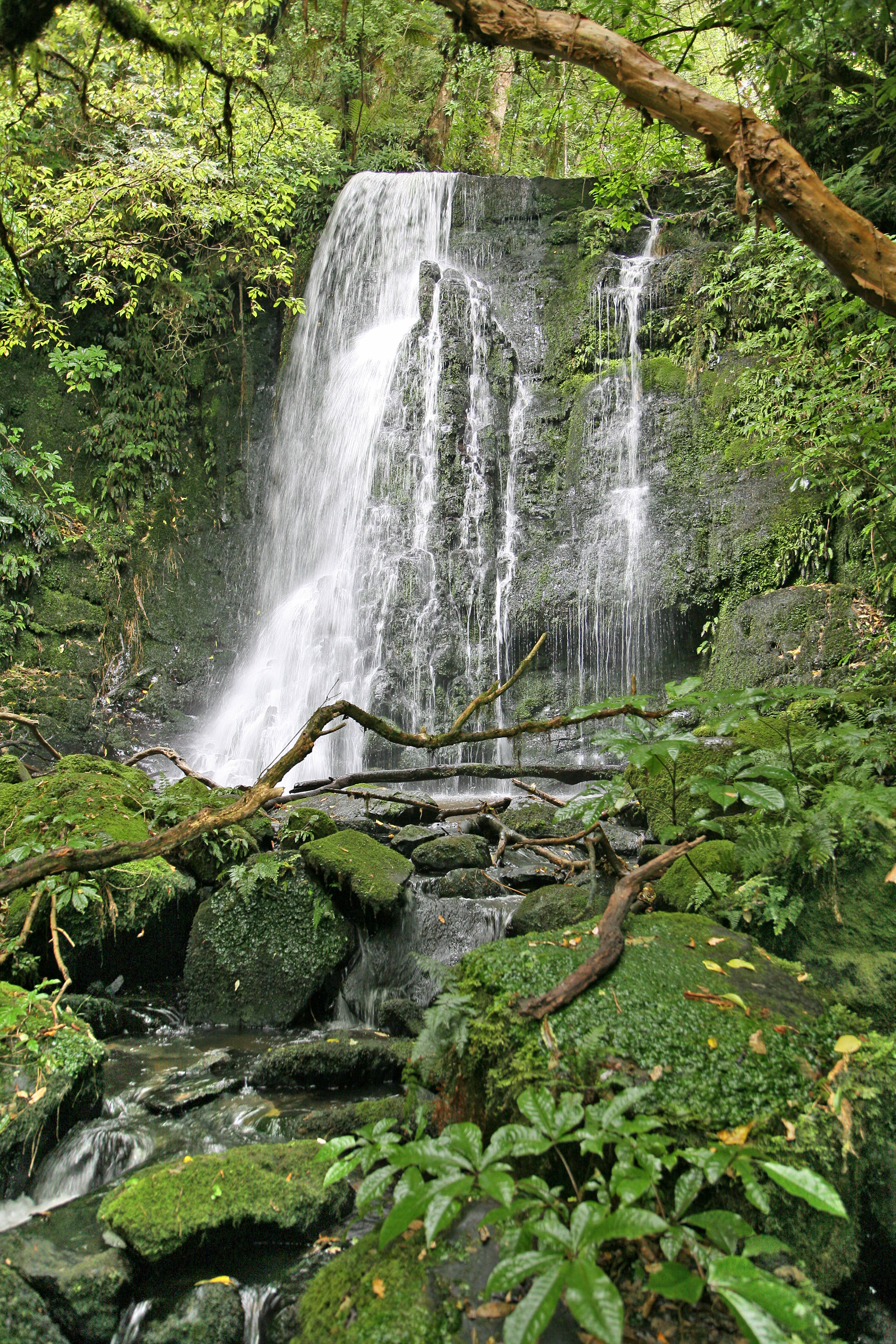
- McLean Falls in The Catlins

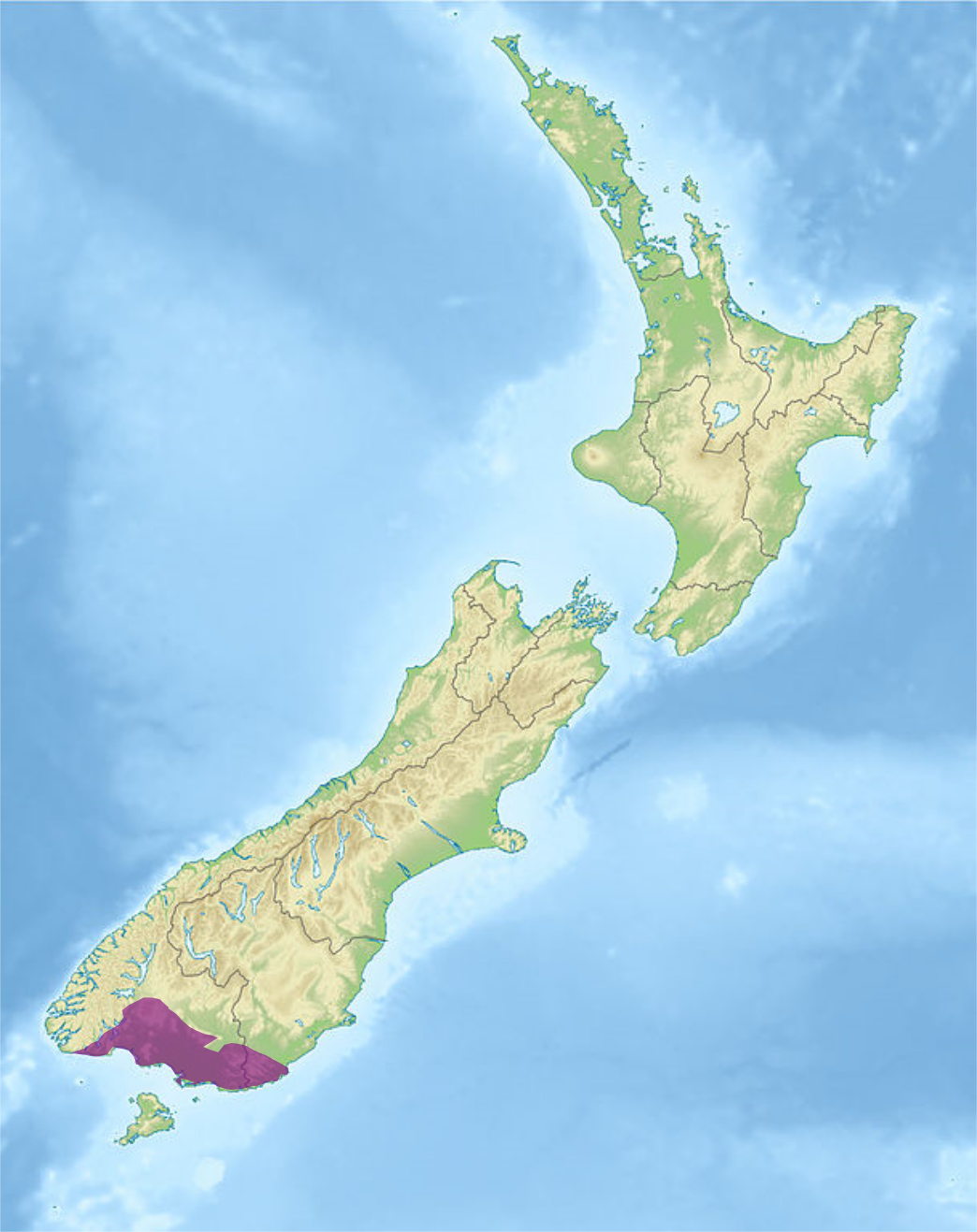
- Ecoregion territory (in purple)

Ecology
- Realm: Australasian
- Biome: temperate broadleaf and mixed forests
- Borders: Canterbury-Otago tussock grasslands; Fiordland temperate forests, Southland montane grasslands

Geography
- Area: 11,603 km^{2} (4,480 sq mi)
- Country: New Zealand
- Regions: Otago; Southland
- Coordinates: 46.21°S 168.38°E

Conservation
- Protected: 2,396 km² (21%)

The Southland temperate forests is a temperate broadleaf and mixed forests ecoregion on New Zealand's South Island. The natural vegetation was mostly forest, but over the centuries human activities, including grazing and fires, replaced much of the original forest with grassland and agriculture.

== Geography ==
The Southland temperate forests occupy the southernmost portion of the South Island. Fiordland lies to the west. The South Pacific Ocean lies to the south and southeast. The Takitimu Mountains and Hokonui Hills form the northern edge of the ecoregion. Other highlands include the Longwood Range in the southwest, and The Catlins in the southeast. The Southland Plains cover the central-southern portion of the ecoregion. Invercargill is the largest city in the ecoregion. Most of the ecoregion lies within the Southland Region, with part of the northeast of the ecoregion being in Otago.

== Flora ==
The natural vegetation was mostly forest of broadleaf trees and podocarp conifers. Higher-elevation forests are predominantly southern beech (Nothofagus), including silver beech (Nothofagus menziesii) in the western mountains and red beech (Nothofagus fusca) in the northern mountains. The lowland forests include broadleaf trees and podocarps, with kahikatea (Dacrycarpus dacrydioides) common in swampy areas and rimu (Dacrydium cupressinum) in drier areas. The broadleaf evergreen southern rata (Metrosideros umbellata) and kamahi (Weinmannia racemosa) are found in the central hill country and in The Catlins.

Tussock grasslands occurred naturally, and expanded into large areas where the forests were burned or cleared. Red tussock grass (Chionochloa rubra) was the predominant species, with snow tussocks (primarily Chionochloa spp.) found on the higher peaks.

Other habitats include dunes, coastal and riverine wetlands, and coastal tussock grasslands.

== Fauna ==
Native birds include the yellow-eyed penguin (Megadyptes antipodes), yellowhead or mōhua (Mohoua ochrocephala), and New Zealand rock wren (Xenicus gilviventris). Swamp harriers (Circus approximans) and South Island fernbirds (Bowdleria punctata punctata) inhabit the tussock grasslands.

Southern elephant seals (Mirounga leonina), New Zealand fur seals (Arctophoca forsteri) and New Zealand sea lions (Phocarctos hookeri) live on the shore.

== History ==
At the end of the ice age, New Zealand's glaciers retreated and the region became forested. In New Zealand birds were the largest land animals, and several species of flightless moa inhabited the ecoregion, along with Haast's eagle (Hieraaetus moorei), the flightless New Zealand swan (Cygnus sumnerensis) and the South Island goose (Cnemiornis calcitrans).

The Māori settled the region after 1300. The early settlers hunted birds and seals, and the moa, New Zealand swan, and New Zealand goose were hunted to extinction. Haast's eagle relied on moas for food, and also became extinct. Hunters set fires to drive game from the forests, and frequent fires converted large areas of forest to tussock grassland. As populations of large birds and seals dwindled, fishing became an increasingly important source of food for the local Maori and they established kaika or seasonal camps, along the shoreline.

European settlers arrived in the 19th century. Mixed-race whaling bases were established at Port Molyneux, Tautuku, and Waikawa, but the whales were soon over-hunted and whaling was abandoned. In the second half of the 19th century farmers and loggers settled the region, and sawmilling became an important local industry.

The Southland Plains became one of New Zealand's most productive agricultural areas. Much of the remaining lowland forest was cleared, and many of the wetlands were drained or filled. Large-scale livestock grazing and introduced exotic grasses altered the ecology of the grasslands.

== Conservation and threats ==
Large areas of the ecoregion have been converted to farmland or pasture. Over the past several decades a network of protected areas has been established to preserve several remaining blocks of upland forest and coastal wetland habitat. Logging, land clearance for development, and introduced exotic species remain threats to the ecoregion's biodiversity.

== Protected areas ==
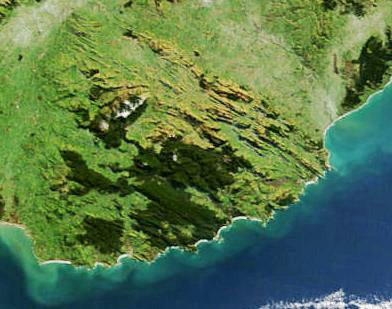
Satellite image of The Catlins in the eastern portion of the ecoregion. The dark-green areas are forests, mostly located on the parallel strike ridges of the Southland Syncline.

A 2017 assessment found that 2,396 km², or 21%, of the ecoregion is in protected areas. Catlins Conservation Park (528.89 km²), established in 1975, is the largest protected area in the ecoregion. Others include Takitimu Conservation Area (457.14 km²) in the Takitimu Mountains, Longwood Forest Stewardship Area (229.55 km²) in the Longwood Range, Hokonui Forest Stewardship Area (53.68 km²) in the Hokonui Hills, and Seaward Moss Stewardship Area (56.22 km²) on the southern coast.
