= Nelson Coast temperate forests =

Ecoregion in New Zealand

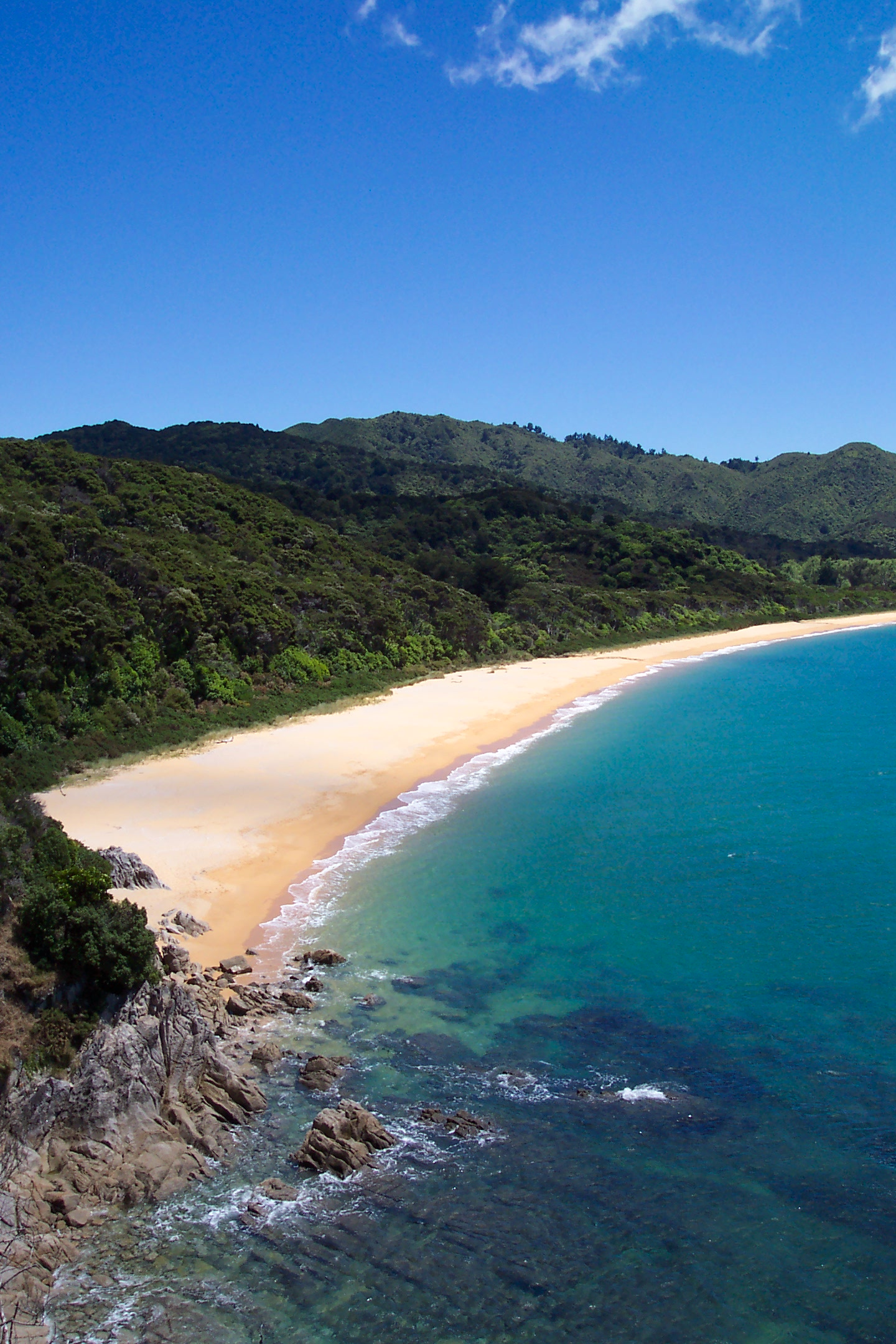
- Beach and forest in Abel Tasman National Park

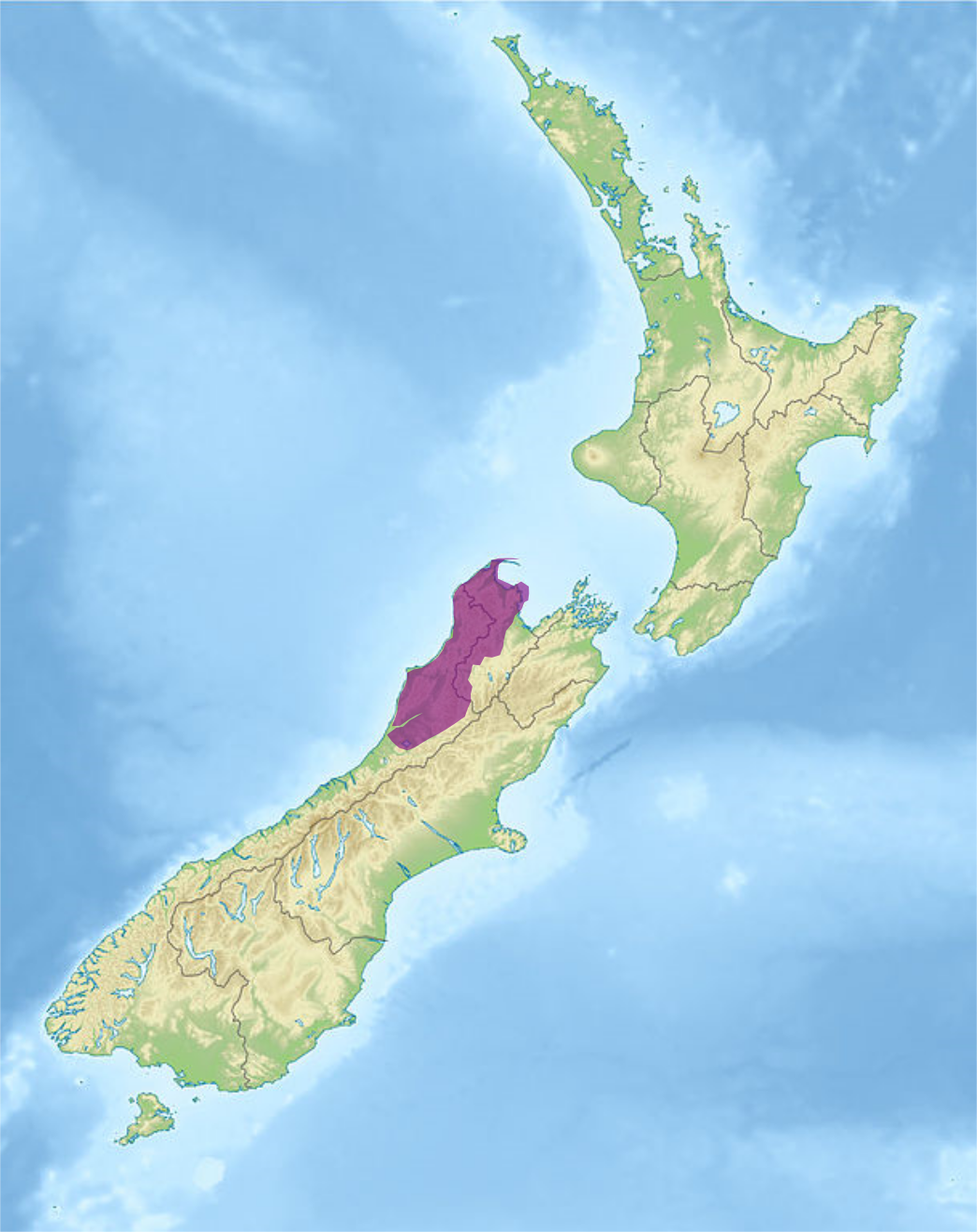
- Ecoregion territory (in purple)

Ecology
- Realm: Australasian
- Biome: temperate broadleaf and mixed forests
- Borders: Richmond temperate forests; Southland montane grasslands, Westland temperate forests

Geography
- Area: 14,451 km^{2} (5,580 sq mi)
- Country: New Zealand
- Regions: Tasman; West Coast
- Coordinates: 41.6°S 172.12°E

Conservation
- Protected: 11,407 km² (79%)

The Nelson Coast temperate forests is an ecoregion in New Zealand.

== Location and description ==
These forests are located on the flanks of the Paparoa Range and other mountains at the top of South Island. The area is thickly forested and has high rainfall, especially on the west-facing slopes but less so on the sheltered eastern side, which has golden sand beaches. Natural features of the region include: the limestone Pancake Rocks near the town of Punakaiki on the edge of Paparoa National Park; Farewell Spit at the north of the island, the longest sandspit in New Zealand; the nearby Te Waikoropupu Springs; and the karst areas on the flanks of Mount Owen (New Zealand) in Kahurangi National Park.

== Flora ==
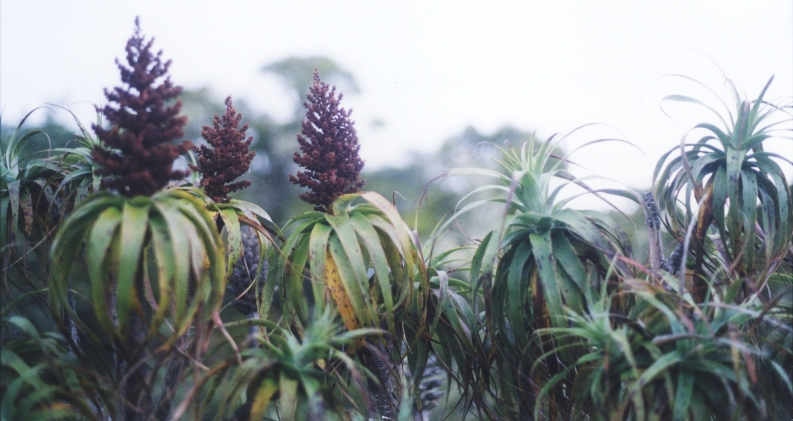
Dracophyllum traversii on Mount Arthur, Kahurangi National Park

There are small areas of northern rata (Metrosideros robusta), rimu, and miro rainforest hardwoods as well as karaka (Corynocarpus laevigatus) and the Nīkau palm (Rhopalostylis sapida) near the coast. However most of the area is covered in Southern beech forest containing all four species of Southern beech; red beech, silver beech and hard beech in the lowlands and mountain beech higher up. In the less fertile rocks areas there are yellow pine (Halocarpus biformis) and Dracophyllums including the endemic D. townsonii and the mountain neinei (D. traversii). The alpine plants found here including Celmisia dallii occur as these peaks, along with Fiordland at the southern end of the island, were a high-elevation refuge from the effects of the last ice age.

== Fauna ==
The forests are home to a number of endemic species including two flightless birds that no longer survive in the lowland areas of the island, these are the western weka and the largest kiwi, the great spotted kiwi. The varied habitats in the region support a mixture of other birds found here include the kea, the kākā (Nestor meridionalis), the kererū (Hemiphaga novaeseelandiae) and the kārearea (Falco novaeseelandiae). Farewell Spit in particular is an important site for wading birds and is on a migration route. The area is also rich in invertebrates including almost half of the known species of amber snails (Powelliphanta).

== Threats and preservation ==
The forests are threatened by logging and mining, although it is impossible to get permits for large-scale mining in the Kahurangi. The karst limestone is particularly fragile and even damaged by recreational caving. The wildlife is threatened by introduced species but they are largely intact at higher elevations. Much of the ecoregion is protected within three national parks; the large Kahurangi National Park and Paparoa National Parks on the west coast, and Abel Tasman National Park on the north east coast. The coastline is unspoilt too and some of it, including Farewell Spit, is protected as nature reserves of national parks. Efforts are being made to control invasive introduced species, particularly possums although deer, chamois, hares and goats are also targeted for control. Birds eggs and snails are vulnerable to rats, possums, stoats and wild pigs. Forest fires are always a threat.
