= Westland temperate forests =

Terrestrial ecoregion in New Zealand

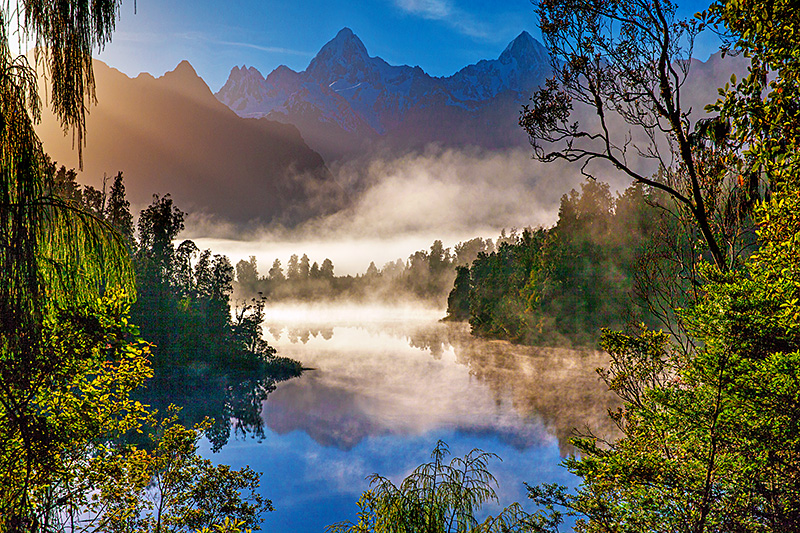
- Lake Matheson in Westland Tai Poutini National Park

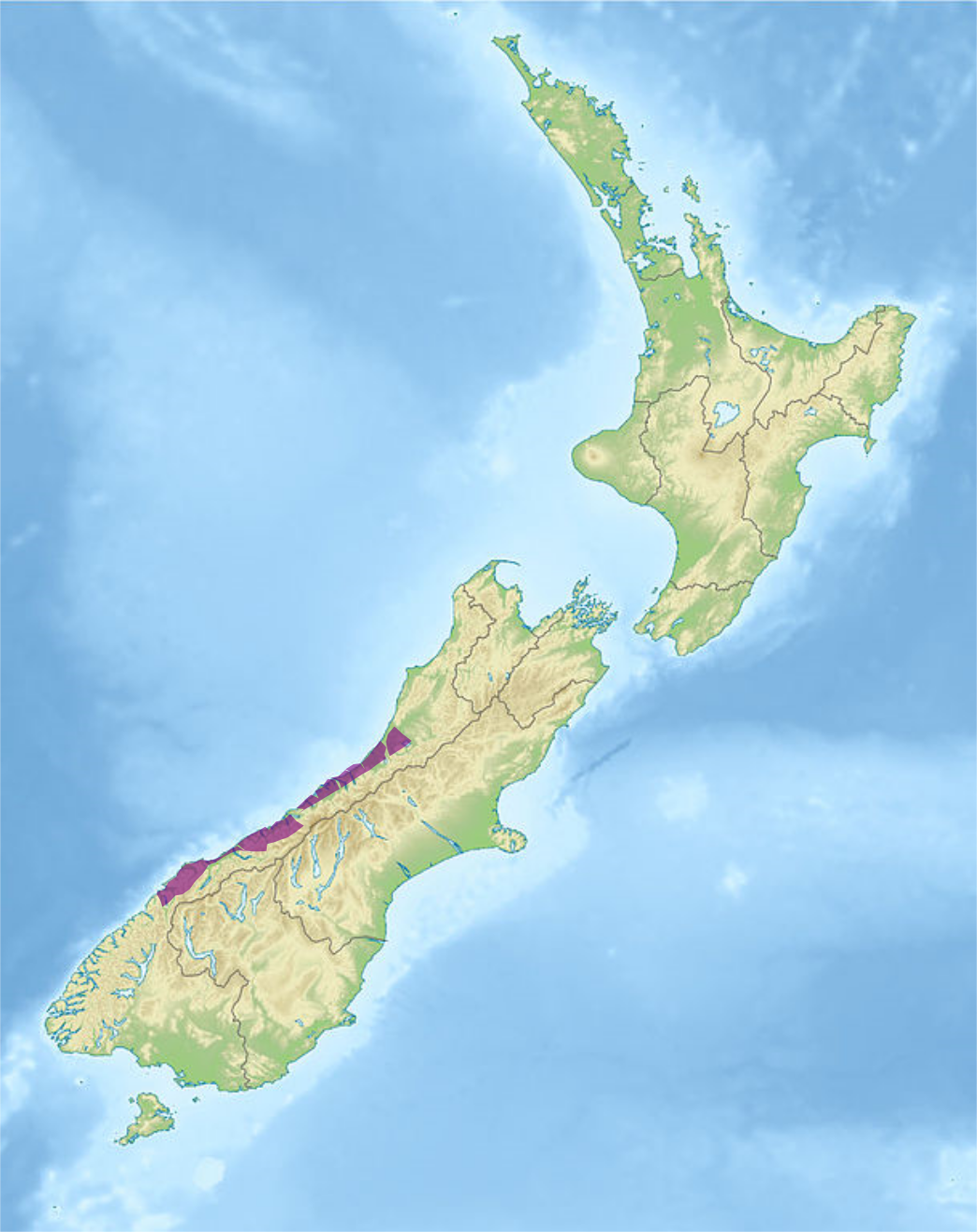
- Ecoregion territory (in purple)

Ecology
- Realm: Australasian
- Biome: temperate broadleaf and mixed forests
- Borders: Fiordland temperate forests; Nelson Coast temperate forests, Southland montane grasslands

Geography
- Area: 5,136 km^{2} (1,983 mi^{2})
- Country: New Zealand
- Regions: West Coast
- Coordinates: 43.7°S 169.45°E

Conservation
- Protected: 4,311 km² (84%)

The Westland temperate forests, also known as the Westland temperate rainforests, is a temperate broadleaf and mixed forests ecoregion located along the central west coast of New Zealand’s South Island, also known as Te Waipounamu. These forests are found in the region of the Westland District, which spans approximately 11,880 square kilometers. It is bounded on the west by the Tasman Sea, and on the east by the Southern Alps. Much of this area is protected by the Westland Tai Poutini National Park.

== Geography ==
New Zealand comprises two separate islands located in the Southern Hemisphere, commonly referred to as the North Island and the South Island. The Westland forests are located along the central west coast portion of the South Island. South of these forests lay the Fiordland temperate forests. Many glaciers are located in the Westland area. The Southern Alps run along the coast causing orographic lifting and high precipitation.

Large portions of New Zealand have been protected for conservation purposes, especially in this region. This area has high biodiversity of plants and animals. Due to its remote location New Zealand was one of the last areas to be colonized and was primarily inhabited by the Māori until Europeans arrived in the 1600s.

=== Glaciation ===
Approximately 57 glaciers have been identified within Westland National Park. These all sit among the Southern Alps. Both the Franz Josef and Fox glaciers extend below the tree line, reaching areas as low as 300 meters above sea level. Glaciation in the area has carved out several moraines. The last major glacial advance in this region happened approximately 17,000-20,000 years ago. Many glaciers in this area have not advanced or retreated recently, though there has been much thinning.

The Franz Josef Glacier névé extends from approximately 2,700 meters above sea level to about 1,500 meters above sea level. At this point the glacier “tongue” continues down the mountain reaching its lowest point at about 270 meters above sea level and from that area runs the Waiho River. The Franz Josef has moved many times in the last century, both advancing and retreating.

The Fox Glacier was originally named the Albert glacier by explorer Julius von Haast, though the name was eventually changed to Fox in honor of Sir William Fox, former Prime Minister of the Colony. The Fox Glacier sits about 15 miles south of the Franz Josef Glacier.

=== Geology ===
The Alpine Fault runs diagonally through the South Island of New Zealand from the upper right to the lower left. This fault runs directly between the Southern Alps and the coastal lowlands, going directly through the Westland National Park. It is considered to be the greatest fault in New Zealand, and forms a boundary between the Indo-Australian Plate and the Pacific Plate.

== Climate ==
New Zealand is entirely in the temperate zone. The Westland forests receive high amounts of precipitation, reaching approximately 3,000 millimeters annually on the coast, about 4,700 millimeters at the Franz Josef and Fox glaciers, and exceeding 11,000 millimeters on the mountains where precipitation generally arrives in the form of snowfall. It is due to the mountain ranges and orographic lifting that the Westland area sees so much precipitation. Westland’s coastal location means that its weather is more moderate than areas further inland. Much of the weather is caused by eastward-moving anticyclones. Summer temperatures average around 20 °C with highs around 30 °C. Snow is rare in the lowland areas but prominent at higher elevations, especially around local glaciers.

== Ecology ==
=== Zonation ===
In Westland, the landscape changes quickly from flat lowlands to mountains. Vegetation alters according to elevation, changing between lowland (0-400m elevation; forested, includes lianas and epiphytes), montane (400-800m elevation; forested), subalpine (800-1200m elevation; dense scrub, low forest), low-alpine (1200-1500m elevation; low scrub with tall grasslands), high-alpine (1500-2000 in some areas; herb fields and short grasslands), and nivel zones (as low as 1700m in some areas; incredibly sparse vegetation, only lichens on snow-free rock).

=== Flora ===
Primary succession in this area begins with mosses and algae such as Racomitrium and Trentepohlia. Seedlings, including willow-herbs and Raoulia, begin to sprout, eventually giving way to species such as tree tutu (Coriaria arborea), broom (Carmichaelia arborea), and koromiko (Veronica salicifolia). After a couple decades trees begin to grow in the area and early rata (Metrosideros) and kamahi (Pterophylla racemosa) trees arrive. Once many species have become well established and soil fertility increases new species, including pate (Schefflera digitata), New Zealand broadleaf (Griselinia littoralis), and ferns such as Zealandia pustulata subsp. pustulata and Blechnum capense, begin to establish. After several hundred years podocarp forests finally develop.

Much of the temperate forest in Westland consists of Nothofagus. Gaps between beech stands are occasionally filled with heath and subalpine bush plants.

The largest sections of podocarp forest in Westland New Zealand are found around 43° latitude, where they grow from the western coastal region along the Tasman Sea up to the Southern Alps. Rimu-kamahi forest is common in this area, along with mountain totara (Podocarpus laetus) and southern rata (Metrosideros umbellata).

=== Fauna ===
There are a wide variety of birds that live in this region. Birdwatching in the Westland Tai Poutini National Park provides opportunities to see kea, passerines, tomtits, fantails, and native pigeons. The pūkeko, spur-winged plover, and the kiwi can all be found in the Westland rainforest area as well. Human habitation has highly affected the survival of many of these birds, and several species are endangered or rare. Approximately half of New Zealand's native forest birds are extinct.

Many small animals live in the Westland region, including plant-eaters such as snails, slugs, worms, insect larvae, millipedes, and sprintails. Carnivorous small animals include an extensive number of centipedes, ground beetles, and a huge number of spider species. A large number of the spiders that live on the ground do not build webs, rather they rely on speed and sight to catch prey.

== History ==
Māori occupied the Westland coastal area for several centuries before Europeans began to colonize New Zealand. Māori refer to West Coast, New Zealand as Te Tai Poutini. Population numbers probably never reached very high, no more than several hundred people probably lived in the area at any given time. Their settlements consisted mostly of small villages on the coast. Food sources were abundant in this area. Seafood was especially important to the Māori who smoked eels and seafish, dried whitebait, and often collected seaweed and mussels. Other local food sources included birds such as duck and pigeon. Stone working was also common among the Māori who had access to greenstone, a nephrite jade that was most often gathered near the Arahura River but was also collected from areas much farther away, including the Haast River and Lake Wakatipu.

Europeans first encountered Westland in 1642 when Dutch navigator Abel Janzoon Tasman first sighted mountain peaks from his ship. In 1770 Captain James Cook circumnavigated New Zealand and also observed the mountains lining the coast. Glaciers were first spotted in 1859 by the sailors on the Mary Louisa. Increased interest in the area began in the mid-1800s when the New Zealand Company began exploring the Westland region in hope of good land for settlement. Over time, various explorers including Charles Heaphy, Thomas Brunner, James McKay, and Julius von Haast, traversed the Westland area, often with Māori guides to lead them. In 1860 James McKay, employed by the local colonial government, managed to purchase a large portion of the west coast of New Zealand from the Māori for the price of 300 pounds. Four years later, in 1864, the desire for gold led thousands of miners to New Zealand. By the early 1900s the height of search for gold had passed, but the residual negative effects of the search for gold remained.

In 1961, Westland Tai Poutini National Park was established, and in 1982 the decision was made to add South Ōkārito and South Waikukupa, as well as portions of the Karangarua forests, into the national park. This addition took place in light of a new National Parks Act that was helpful for determining the importance of preserving these areas.

== Disturbances ==
Human activity has been one of the major disturbances in the New Zealand Westland rainforest. At one point the Māori used to set intentional fires that affected the forests growing on the South Island. This greatly altered the landscape, and much of the forest along the east side of the South Island was replaced by grasslands.

Both fires and logging have been major disturbances in the Westland forest area. Currently there is no logging going on in native forested areas of New Zealand. Much of the temperate rainforest found in Westland New Zealand has been dedicated to conservation purposes.

Some of the stands that feature rata-kamahi have trouble with die-back caused in part by possums that like to find shelter within older trees (around 300 years), especially ones that grow on fertile ground.

Changes in climate may affect Westland temperate rainforests in the future. There is a chance that increased frequencies of droughts may instigate increased risk of fire, causing potential for replacement of current rainforest vegetation with fire-adapted plants.

== Conservation ==
Large portions of New Zealand have been placed under protection for conservation purposes. 82% of the ecoregion's land area is in protected areas. Westland Tai Poutini National Park covers approximately 20,000 acres or about 81 square kilometers, about 25% of which is glaciers and snowfields. Other protected areas which cover portions of the ecoregion include Fiordland National Park, Mount Aspiring National Park, and Waitangiroto Nature Reserve.

== Recreation ==
The Westland National Park features many opportunities for recreation including walking and hiking, fishing, skiing, boating, and taking tours around and on the local glaciers. There are many trails that can be explored that take you to various lakes, streams, rivers, and bluffs.
