= Canterbury–Otago tussock grasslands =

Terrestrial ecoregion in New Zealand

Canterbury-Otago tussock grasslands
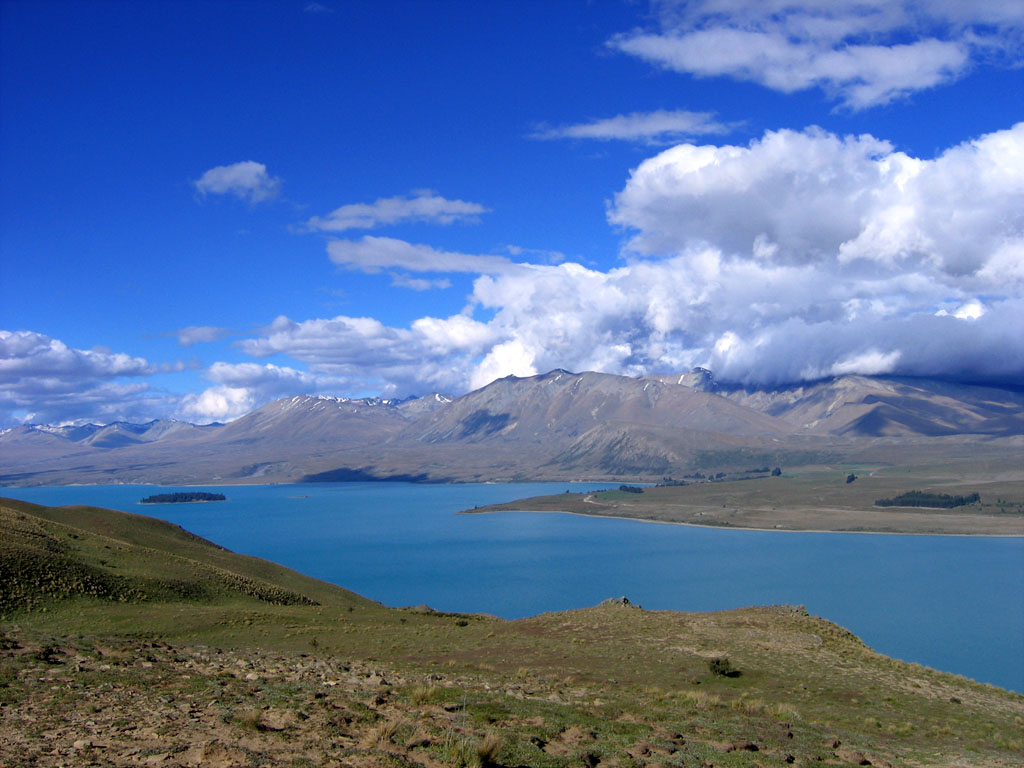
- Lake Tekapo, in the Mackenzie Basin, is a reservoir surrounded by tussock grassland.

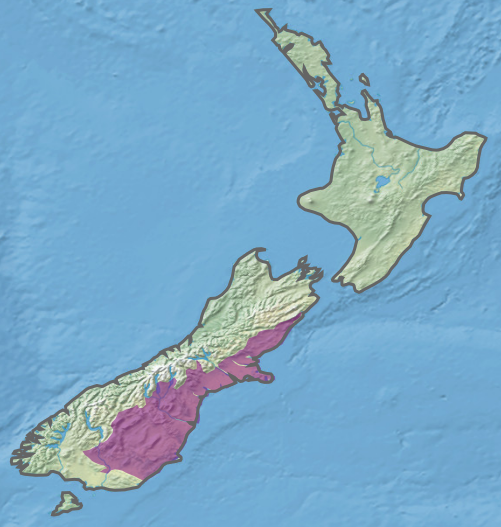
- Ecoregion territory (in purple)

Ecology
- Realm: Australasia
- Biome: Temperate grasslands, savannas, and shrublands

Geography
- Area: 53,500 km^{2} (20,700 mi^{2})
- Country: New Zealand
- Coordinates: 44.75°S 170.45°E

The Canterbury–Otago tussock grasslands is an ecoregion of the South Island, New Zealand, part of the wider tussock grasslands of New Zealand.

== Location and description ==
This ecoregion is a large area of dry grassy plains between the east coast and the Southern Alps / Kā Tiritiri o te Moana, in the regions of Canterbury and Otago. The area includes the Canterbury Plains along the coast, uplands such as the mountains of Central Otago and the Hawkdun Range and mountain basins such as the Mackenzie Basin and the Maniototo. The grasslands altogether form the largest flat plain of New Zealand and are largely used for grazing livestock. Less rain falls on this eastern side of the Southern Alps so the climate is dry with a warm summer and cold winter, with the highland basins being the driest of all (less than 500mm per year). The upland areas of Canterbury, such as the Craigieburn are higher and wetter than those of Old Man Range and the other flat-topped blocks of Otago, which are colder and often covered in wet bogs. A number of rivers including the Rangitata, Rakaia, Ashburton / Hakatere and Waimakariri cross the Canterbury Plains in a unique web of braids that weave in and out of each other. The rivers of Otago are deeper and include New Zealand's largest, the Clutha River / Mata-Au.

== Flora ==
There are few endemic plants on these grassy plains. While there was probably once forest the plains are now special in New Zealand as a large area of pasture almost entirely covered with grasses that are resilient to drought and the constant threat of fire. The endemic tussock grasses such as slim snow tussock have now been replaced by introduced pasture grasses in many areas. Some upland areas have a cover of Chionochloa tussocks plus heath of Chionohebe and spiky Aciphylla plus some threatened plant species including the shrub Hebe cupressoides, a daisy (Olearia hectorii), and some Peraxilla mistletoes.

In some places there are patches of original or replanted beech forest. The Hinewai Reserve on the Banks Peninsula preserves enclaves old-growth and second-growth forest, mostly of red beech (Nothofagus fusca), with evergreen broadleaf shrubs and low trees including kānuka (Kunzea spp.), māhoe (Melicytus spp.), Pseudopanax arboreus, Schefflera digitata, kōwhai (Sophora spp.), scattered podocarp conifers tōtara (Podocarpus totara), mataī (Prumnopitys taxifolia), and kahikatea (Dacrycarpus dacrydioides), and many species of ferns in the understory.

Finally plants of the Canterbury riverine areas include lichens, Raoulia daisies, willowherbs, and shrubs like Muehlenbeckia.

== Fauna ==
The dry grasslands are home to a large number of insects including beetles, grasshoppers, cicadas, moths, and wētā (a kind of large grasshopper). One particular insect is the Prodontria lewisi which only remains in a small area of sand dunes around Cromwell. Endemic reptiles include two rare lizards, the Otago skink (Oligosoma otagense) and the grand skink (Oligosoma grande). The Canterbury riverbeds are an important habitat for invertebrates such as McCann's skink (Oligosoma maccanni), and especially birds such as the very rare black stilt (Himantopus novazelandiae) which remains only in wetlands of the Waitaki River system. Another endemic species of the Canterbury plains is the Canterbury mudfish (Neochanna burrowsius) which has adapted to burying itself in the mud of riverbeds during the dry season. Finally the Otago Peninsula is an important breeding ground for the New Zealand fur seal (Arctophoca forsteri) and New Zealand sea lion (Phocarctos hookeri).

== Threats and preservation ==
These grasslands are now mostly utilised as pasture with overgrazing, increased occurrence of fire and urban development all causing damage, while waterways are subject to alteration. Original wildlife has also been damaged by introduced plants including lodgepole pine, broom, and sweet briar, while hawkweed and other weeds can more easily establish themselves when land is overgrazed. Introduced species of animals that cause damage include possums, goats, red-necked wallaby, and red deer along with predators such as cats, rats, stoats and ferrets. Protection of the tussock grassland is an ongoing concern and a project of the Department of Conservation working with local communities to establish protected areas and restrict grazing. A number of areas have already been set aside and formal protection is being established in Rock and Pillar Range, Lammermoor Range, Old Man Range, Old Woman Range, Pisa Range and The Remarkables. However these are all upland areas and the original habitats of the lowlands are in a much more precarious state having almost entirely disappeared. Separate initiatives have been set up to preserve habitats in the Canterbury lowland riverbeds and their endangered black stilt population.
