= List of ecoregions in Venezuela =

The following is a list of ecoregions in Venezuela as identified by the World Wide Fund for Nature (WWF).

== Terrestrial ==
Venezuela is in the Neotropical realm. Ecoregions are listed by biome.

=== Tropical and subtropical moist broadleaf forests ===
- Catatumbo moist forests
- Cordillera de la Costa montane forests
- Cordillera Oriental montane forests
- Guayanan Highlands moist forests
- Guianan moist forests
- Guianan piedmont and lowland moist forests
- Japurá–Solimões–Negro moist forests
- Negro–Branco moist forests
- Orinoco Delta swamp forests
- Tepuis
- Venezuelan Andes montane forests

=== Tropical and subtropical dry broadleaf forests ===
- Apure–Villavicencio dry forests
- Lara–Falcón dry forests
- Maracaibo dry forests

=== Tropical and subtropical grasslands, savannas, and shrublands ===
- Guianan savanna
- Llanos

=== Flooded grasslands and savannas ===
- Orinoco wetlands

=== Montane grasslands and shrublands ===
- Cordillera de Merida páramo

=== Deserts and xeric shrublands ===
- Araya and Paria xeric scrub
- Guajira–Barranquilla xeric scrub
- La Costa xeric shrublands
- Paraguana xeric scrub

=== Mangroves ===
- Coastal Venezuelan mangroves
- Guianan mangroves

== Marine ==
=== Tropical Atlantic ===
- Guianian
- Southern Caribbean
