= Coastal Venezuelan mangroves =

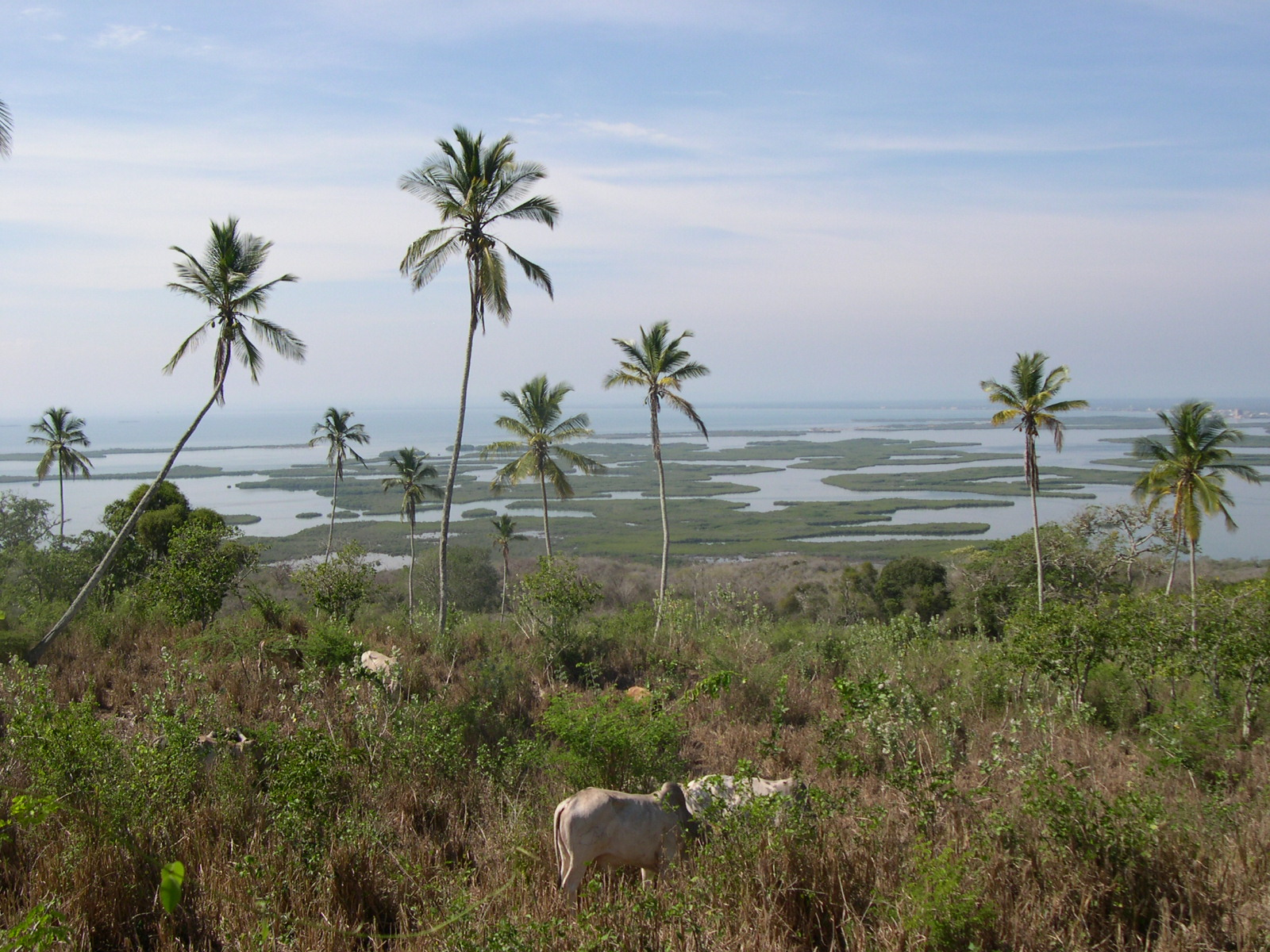
- Morrocoy National Park

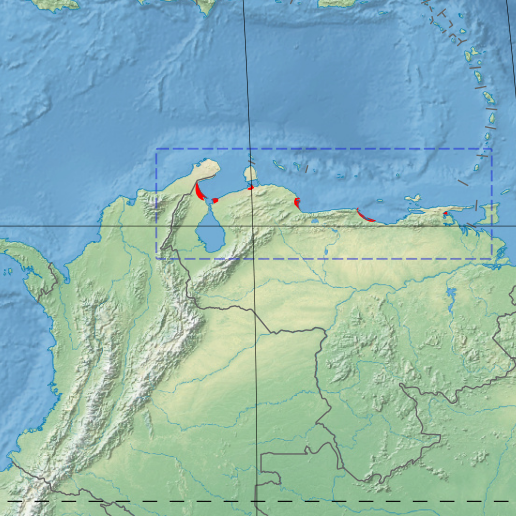
- Ecoregion territory (in red)

Ecology
- Realm: Neotropic
- Biome: Mangroves

Geography
- Area: 5,698 km^{2} (2,200 sq mi)
- Country: Venezuela
- Coordinates: 10.88°N 68.28°W

The Coastal Venezuelan mangroves ecoregion (WWF ID: NT1408) covers the salt-water mangrove forests along the Caribbean Sea and Atlantic Ocean coast of Venezuela, from Cocinetas Basin (on the western border with Colombia) to the edge of the Caño Manamo River and the Orinoco Delta in the east. It is one of the largest mangrove ecoregions in South America, with an area of 5,698 km2, and stretching across over 400 km of Venezuelan coastline.

== Location and description ==
Mangrove forests line about one-fourth of the coast of Venezuela. Each individual site is relatively small, the majority being under 40 km2. The sites on the western, Caribbean, coast are drier and often have a savanna-like character. The eastern sites, on the Atlantic Ocean coast from the Gulf of Paria to the western edge of the Orinoco Delta, is wetter with precipitation up to 2,000 mm/year. There are small islands offshore with mangrove stands also.

Mangrove sites vary in character by surrounding topography. Some form on the margins of gulfs or lagoons - such as the Gulf of Venezuela in the west and the Gulf of Paria in the east. Others form at the mouths of rivers - such as the El Limón River in the west, the Neverí River through Barcelona, the Manzanares River near Cumaná, and the San Juan River in the east. Small offshore islands often have mangrove areas, as do some lowland coastal areas.

== Climate ==
The climate of the ecoregion is Tropical savanna climate - dry winter (Köppen climate classification (Aw)). This climate is characterized by relatively even temperatures throughout the year, and a pronounced dry season. The driest month has less than 60 mm of precipitation, and is drier than the average month. Precipitation averages from under 200 mm/year in the drier western areas, to over 1,600 mm/year in the east.

== Flora and fauna ==
The most common tree species are red mangrove (Rhizophora mangle), black mangrove (Avicennia germinans) and white mangrove (Laguncularia racemosa). An additional species, the buttonwood mangrove (Conocarpus erectus), while not a true mangrove species, is found in the more arid areas. Associated vegetation includes thorn scrub woodlands, coastal evergreen trees, ferns (Acrostichum aureum) and mallows of genus Malvaceae, such as coastal hibiscus Hibiscus tiliaceus.

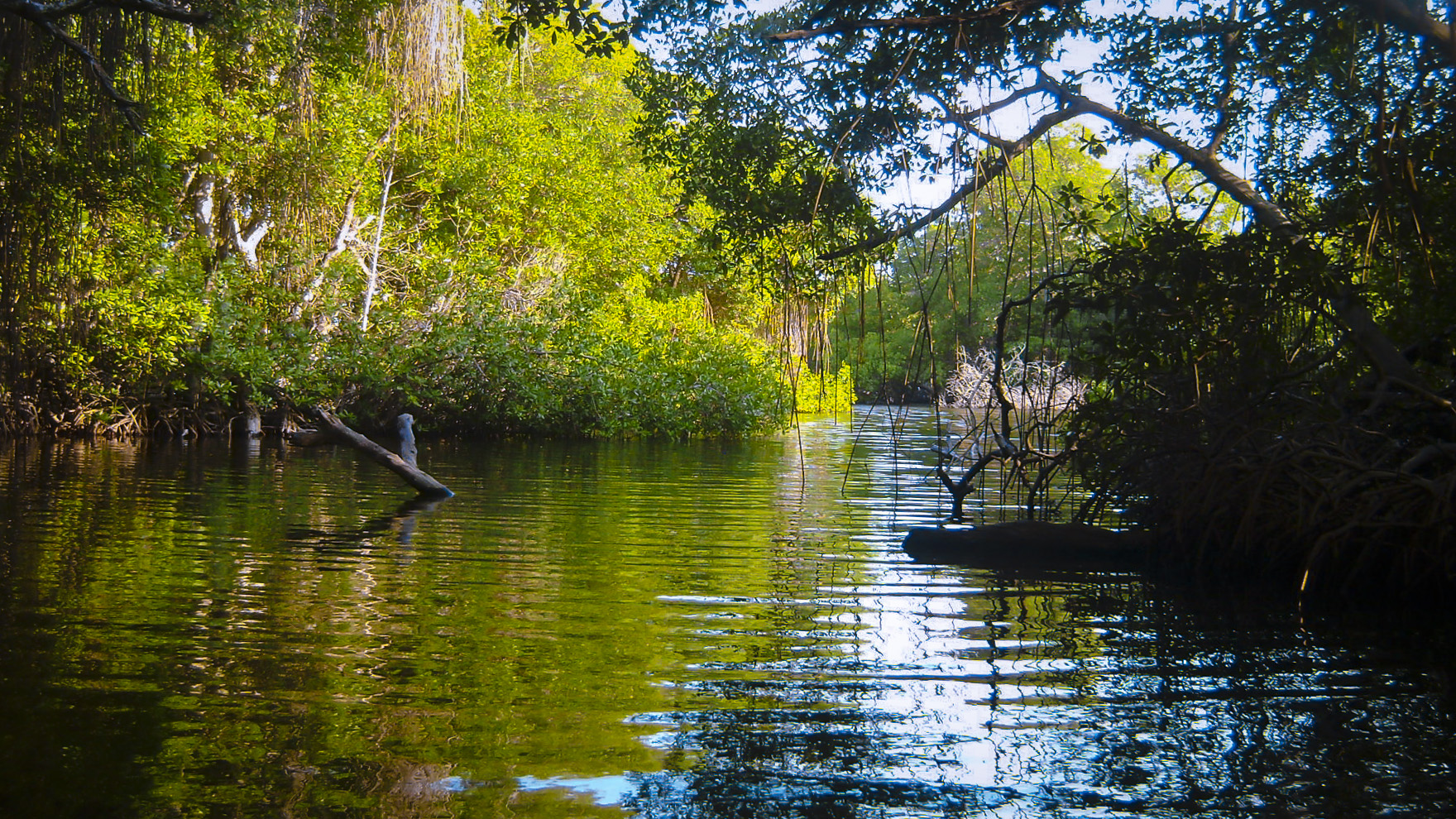
Mangrove in Morrocoy National Park

== Protected areas ==
Significant protected areas in the ecoregion include:

- Morrocoy National Park
- Turuépano National Park
