= Orinoco wetlands =

Ecoregion in northeast Venezuela

Orinoco wetlands (NT0906)
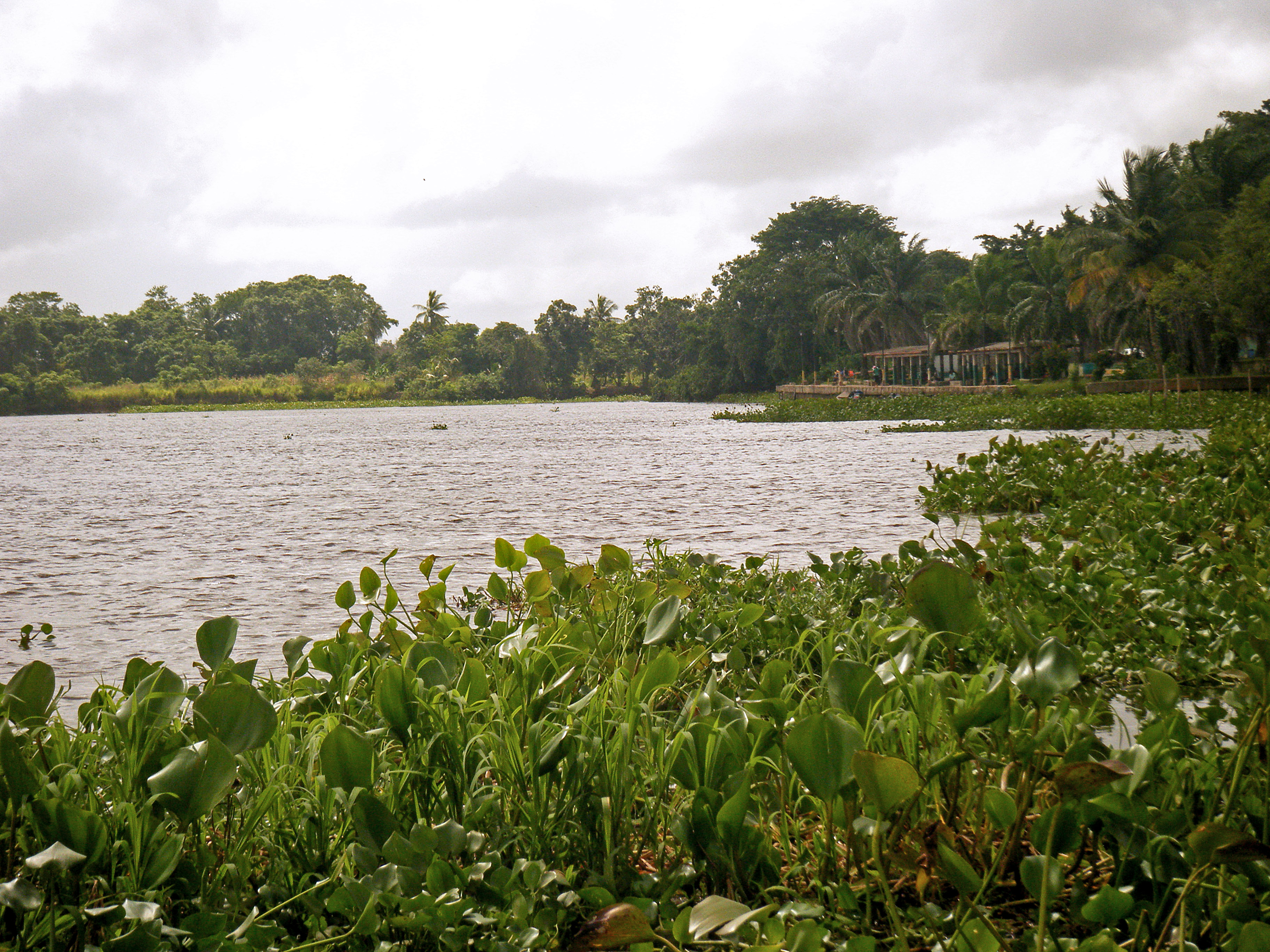
- River bank in Boca de Uracoa, Monagas

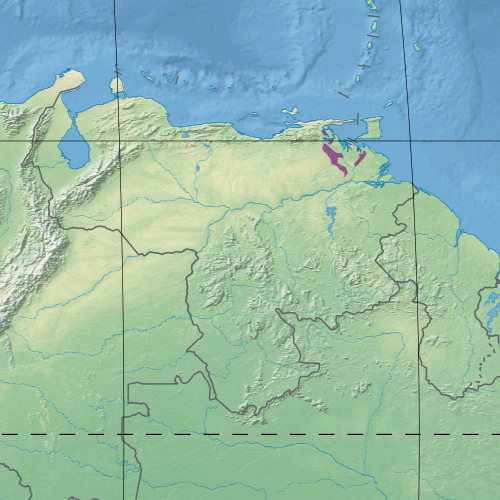
- Ecoregion territory (in purple)

Ecology
- Realm: Neotropical
- Biome: Flooded grasslands and savannas

Geography
- Area: 5,957 km^{2} (2,300 sq mi)
- Country: Venezuela
- Coordinates: 9.360°N 62.432°W
- Climate type: Af: equatorial, fully humid

The Orinoco wetlands (NT0906) is an ecoregion of northeast Venezuela within the northern Orinoco Delta. It holds areas of tall grasses in flooded land, surrounded by mangroves and swamp forest, giving way to the drier Llanos savanna in the west.

== Location ==
The Orinoco Wetlands ecoregion is in the northern Orinoco Delta in northeast Venezuela. They cover an area of 595,697 hectares (1,472,000 acres). The wetlands adjoin or lie within the Orinoco Delta swamp forests. Near the coast they merge into the Amazon-Orinoco-Southern Caribbean mangroves. To the west they give way to the Llanos grasslands.

The flooded grasslands of the Orinoco wetlands are found in seven separate patches north of the main Orinoco channel, surrounded by mangroves, swamp forest, moist forest and llanos. The main part is near Tucupita along the Caño Manamo, the westernmost distributary of the Orinoco. The second largest patch is along the Caño Macarao. To the north they are found along the Boca Grande and San Juan rivers, and in the alluvial fan at the mouth of the Amacuro River. There are other patches between the coastal mangroves and the swamp forests.

== Physical ==
The terrain is flat, mostly about 1 metre (3 ft 3 in) above sea level but rising to 9 metres (30 ft) in levees along the coast. Soils are almost all alluvial deposits, carried from the Andes far to the west. The 360 kilometres (220 mi) coastline of the delta moves east into the Atlantic Ocean by about 40 metres (130 ft) annually. The delta region has many large and small distributary rivers and streams, permanent wetlands and marshes, oxbow lakes, levees and alluvial plains. The region is sparsely inhabited apart from the small city of Tucupita on the edge of the region and small communities of Warao people along the rivers.

== Climate ==
The Köppen climate classification is "Af": equatorial, fully humid. Average annual rainfall in different places varies from 1,000 to 2,000 millimetres (39 to 79 in). The wet season usually lasts from April/May to December, with a period of less rain in July. At a sample location at coordinates 9.25°N 62.25°W the temperature is relatively constant throughout the year, slightly cooler in January and July, and slightly warmer in May and October. Yearly average temperatures range from a minimum of 22 °C (72 °F) to a maximum of 31.8 °C (89.2 °F) with a mean of 27.2 °C (81.0 °F). Annual rainfall averages 1,300 millimetres (51 in). Monthly rainfall varies from 35.5 millimetres (1.40 in) in February to 204.5 millimetres (8.05 in) in July.

== Ecology ==
The Orinoco wetlands are in the flooded grasslands and savannas biome.

=== Flora ===
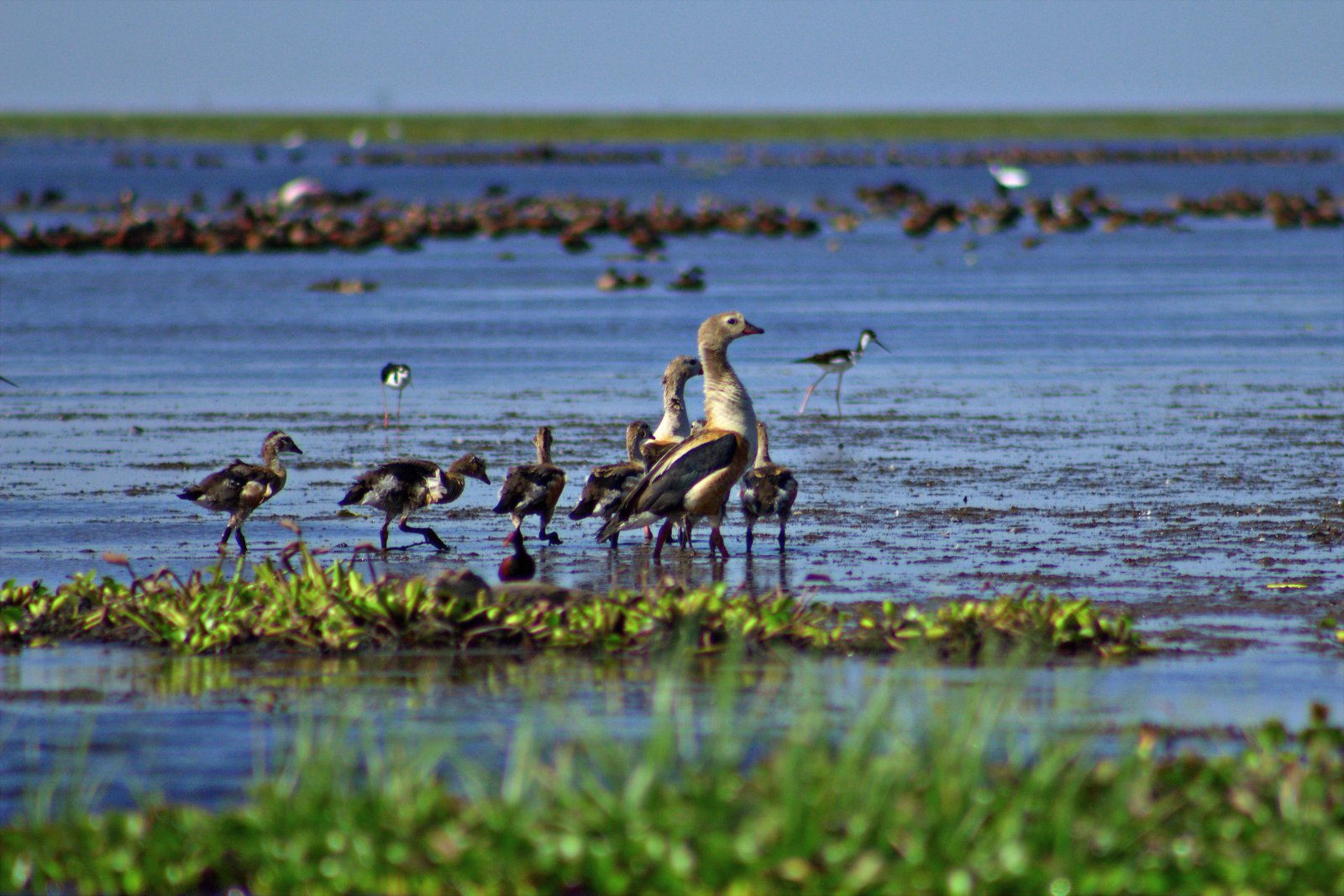
Family of Orinoco goose (Neochen jubata)

The patches of wetlands are scattered through a landscape of swamp forests, mangroves, and llanos. Their central sections hold tropical tall flooded grasslands that contain very few shrubs or trees. The tall grasses include Lagenocarpus guianensis, Paspalum repens and species of the Jussieua, Mesosetum, Neptunia, and Rhynchospora genera. There are patches of palms among the grasses that include açaí palm (Euterpe oleracea), Manicaria saccifera, Attalea cuatrecasana and species of the Attalea and Trithrinax genera. In some areas there are stands of Mauritia flexuosa. Around the fringes the habitat holds plants from the surrounding mangroves, swamp forest and lowland forest. The grasslands are drier in the west and hold evergreen broadleaf trees.

=== Fauna ===
The stands of moriche palm (Mauritia flexuosa) are important sources of food for many species of primates, rodents and parrots, and are used by many birds for nesting. Threatened species include the giant otter (Pteronura brasiliensis), Orinoco crocodile (Crocodylus intermedius), Amazon river dolphin (Inia geoffrensis), jaguar (Panthera onca), bush dog (Speothos venaticus), Orinoco goose (Neochen jubata), and harpy eagle (Harpia harpyja). Endangered birds also include the yellow-bellied seedeater (Sporophila nigricollis).

== Status ==
The World Wildlife Fund classes the ecoregion as "Relatively Stable/Intact". The Orinoco Delta as a whole is very susceptible to ecological damage, particularly the wetlands. Oil exploration and hydraulic engineering pose the main threats, and growing human presence is another concern, threatening the stocks of fish. The dam built on the Caño Manamo in the 1960s to reduce flooding and allow cattle farming caused increased tidal action and salinity in the upper delta, with major impact on flora and fauna. The Guri Dam on the Caroní River upstream also disrupts seasonal flooding. There are several conservation units that provide varying degrees of protection of the wetlands and other area, such as the Delta del Orinoco biosphere reserve, Turuépano National Park and Mariusa National Park.

== Sources ==
- "Orinoco wetlands", Global Species, Myers Enterprises II
- Schipper, Jan, Northern South America: Northeastern Venezuela (NT0906), WWF: World Wildlife Fund
- WildFinder, WWF: World Wildlife Fund
