= Venezuelan Llanos =

Venezuelan Llanos Llanos Venezolanos
- Geographic/Natural Region
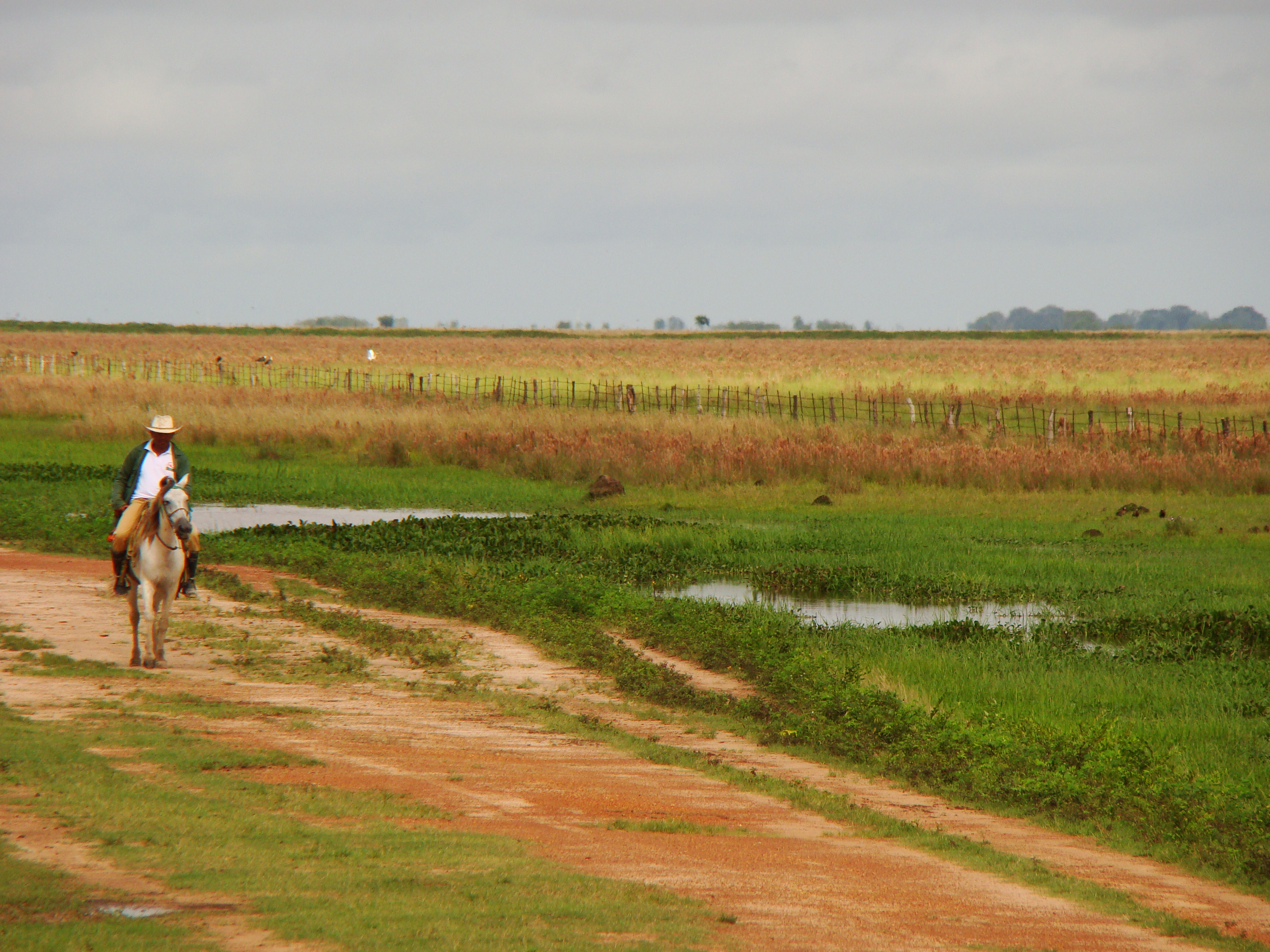
- Typical landscape of Los Llanos

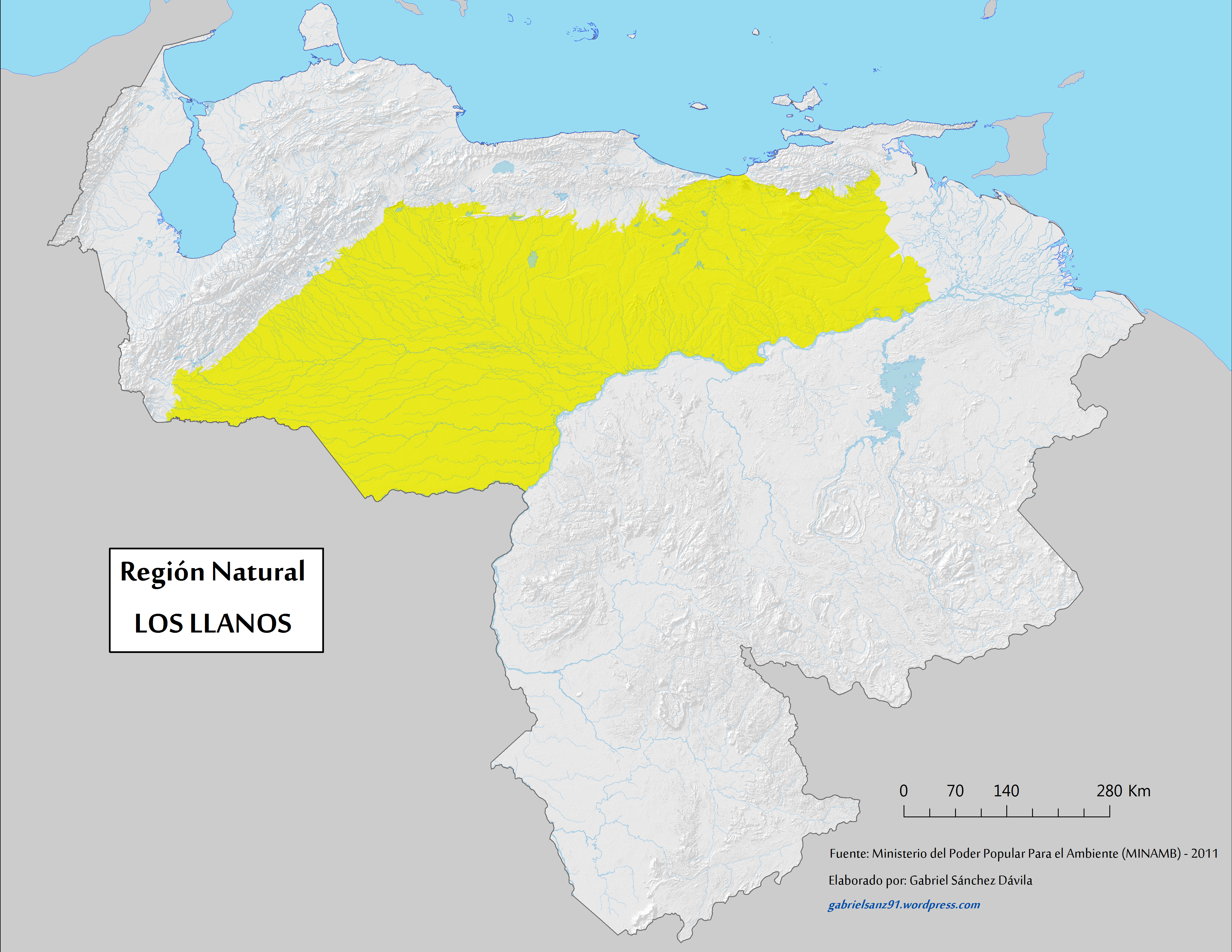
- Geographic map of Los Llanos natural region.
- Coordinates: 8°N 66°W
- Country: Venezuela
- States: Apure, Barinas, Portuguesa, Guárico, Cojedes, Anzoátegui, Monagas
- Region: Los Llanos

Area
  - Total: 243,774 km^{2} (94,122 sq mi)

The Venezuelan Llanos (Spanish: Llanos Venezolanos) also simply known as Los Llanos (English: the Plains) in Venezuela, is a natural region that consists of a very large, flat central depression of approximately 243,774 km^{2} of extension, equivalent to 26.6% of the total continental territory of the country.

It is the largest sedimentary basin of Venezuela of Quaternary origin, since the large volumes of sediments, which are fundamentally alluvial, were deposited during the last two million years of the geological history of the planet. Consequently, the sedimentary fill and its modeling in plain is very recent.

It extends between the Guiana Shield, to the south; the Venezuelan Coastal Range to the north; and the Cordillera de Mérida to the west. It presents two natural exits to the sea; the Unare Depression puts it in contact with the Caribbean Sea in the central-eastern part, and on the east, it has access to the Atlantic Ocean, without interruption of continuity, through the Orinoco Delta.

== Geography ==
Although it is the region with the most uniform relief of the country, its detail study makes it possible to distinguish three large subregions, each with their own morphological and topographical characteristics that influence the possibilities of use and exploitation by the human groups that occupy them. These subregions are:

- Western Venezuelan Llanos
- Central Venezuelan Llanos
- Eastern Venezuelan Llanos

== Geology ==
It is surrounded by orography that date of different ages: to the south the Guiana Shield, of Precambrian origin; and to the north and northwest the Venezuelan Coastal Range and Venezuelan Andes, whose genesis occur in the course of a long period ranging from the Cretaceous to the Pliocene. These emerged areas discharge most of their current waters to this plain, therefore, filled and acquired its present form as a result of the deposition processes caused by the large sedimentary masses that these water currents carry. That is why its origin is in that long process of filling that is fulfilled in the Tertiary; this process of landfilling is still maintained today.

This region suffered a marine transgression, where this primitive sea was a prolongation of the Atlantic Ocean that, like a wide channel, penetrated in Venezuelan territory; so it was until the Upper Tertiary, and to a great extent until the Quaternary when there was a marine regression.

At the bottom of this primitive interior sea giant quantities of organic matter were accumulated, formed by animal and plant remains. The process of decomposition of this matter for thousands and thousands of years came to form the immense oil wealth and coal deposits of this region. In it are located the petroleum basins of Barinas-Apure and the Oriental, which includes the Orinoco Belt, also the coal-basins of Guárico and Anzoátegui.

== Relief ==
Although it does not present a completely uniform topography, the Llanos integrate the Venezuelan region of greater uniformity in its relief and the one that has greater extension of flat and low lands of the country. It has an almost imperceptible slope that is generally inferior to one meter per kilometer (70 cm per km). Los Llanos, therefore, are a broad plain, very flat or slightly undulating, that descends gently from north to south and from east to west, that is, from the mountainous alignments of the Cordillera de Mérida and the Sierra del Interior of the Caribbean Mountain System to the Orinoco river, to the south and the Atlantic Ocean to the east.

== See also ==
- Orinoquía natural region, the continuity of Venezuelan Llanos in Colombia
