= Natural regions of Venezuela =

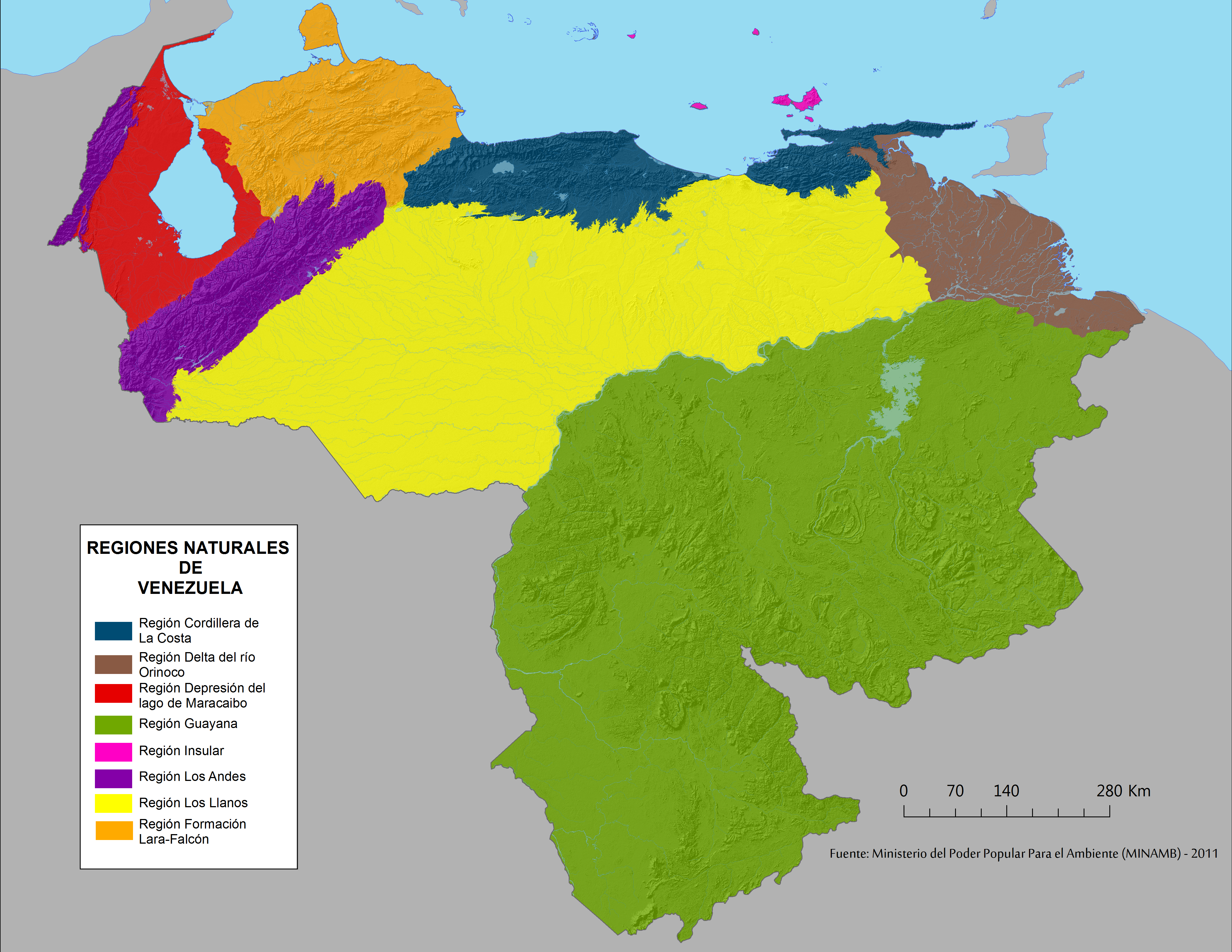
Natural Regions of Venezuela

Percentage area of Venezuelan natural regions
1. Guayana (48.2%)
2. Los Llanos (26.6%)
3. Sistema Coriano (5.75%)
4. Cordillera de La Costa (5.34%)
5. Andes (5.16%)
6. Orinoco Delta (4.76%)
7. Maracaibo Basin (4.02%)
8. Insular (0.14%)

Because of its natural structure, Venezuela can be divided into eight very distinct natural regions. In the classification of a natural region, human influence is not considered. These regions have formed as a consequence of the interactions of geo-physical elements such as: geological constitution, relief, climate, hydrography, vegetation, soils, among others.

The natural regions that make up the Venezuelan territory are:

== Andean Region ==
The Venezuelan Andean system represents the terminal bifurcation of the Cordillera Oriental de Colombia, which in Venezuelan territory consists of two mountainous branches: the Sierra de Perija, smaller, slightly displaced from southwest to northeast with 7,151 km^{2} in Venezuela; and a larger, frankly oriented Southwest to northeast with about 40,172 km^{2}, the Cordillera de Mérida, commonly known as the proper Venezuelan Andes. The highest point in Venezuela is located in this natural region.

It is divided in two sections:

- Cordillera de Mérida: covering almost all the territory of Táchira, Mérida and Trujillo states, the southern area of Lara, and portions of higher areas on the western side of Barinas, Apure and Portuguesa states.
- Sierra de Perija: located at the western extreme of Venezuela in Zulia state, bordering Colombia.

== Cordillera de La Costa Region ==
Is a mountain range system, that runs along the central and eastern portions of Venezuela's northern coast. The range is a northeastern extension of the Andes, and is also known as the Maritime Andes. The Coastal Range actually consists of two parallel ranges, which run east and west along the coast of the Caribbean Sea. The Cojedes River separates the western end of Coastal Range from the Cordillera de Mérida to the southeast. The range is divided into eastern and western sections by the wide bay between Cape Codera and Cumaná.

== Guayana Region ==
is a large massif of approximately 441,921 km^{2} of extension, equivalent to 48.2% of the total continental territory of the country. Its limits by the north and east is formed by the route of the rivers Orinoco, Atabapo and Negro and by the south the borders with Brazil. This region occupies almost half of meridional territory of Venezuela.

== Insular Region ==
It comprises all of the nation's islands, and is formed by the state of Nueva Esparta and the Federal Dependencies.

== Los Llanos Region ==
Is a large central depression very flat in a vast natural region of approximately 243,869^{2} of extension, equivalent to 26.61% of the total continental territory of the country.

== Maracaibo Basin Region ==
Is a foreland basin, found in the northwestern corner of Venezuela in South America. Covering over 35,000 square km, it is a hydrocarbon-rich region that has produced over 30 billion bbl of oil with an estimated 44 billion bbl yet to be recovered. The basin is characterized by a large shallow tidal estuary, Lake Maracaibo, located near its center.

== Orinoco Delta Region ==
Is fan-shaped river delta, formed by the Orinoco River as it splits into numerous distributaries, called caños, which meander through the delta on their way to the sea. The main distributary is called the Rio Grande, which empties south-southeast through the southern portion of the delta, and the second major distributary is Caño Manamo, which runs northward along the western edge of the delta.

== Lara-Falcón Highlands Region ==
Is the hilly and semi-mountainous area in northwest Venezuela. It consists mostly of east-west running ridges, with the exception of the Sierra de Siruma or Empalado which run north-south. The coastal plain of the region contains Venezuela's only desert, the Médanos de Coro (the Coro Dunes), on the Paraguaná Peninsula.
