= Paramaribo swamp forests =

Ecoregion in Suriname

Paramaribo swamp forests (NT0149)
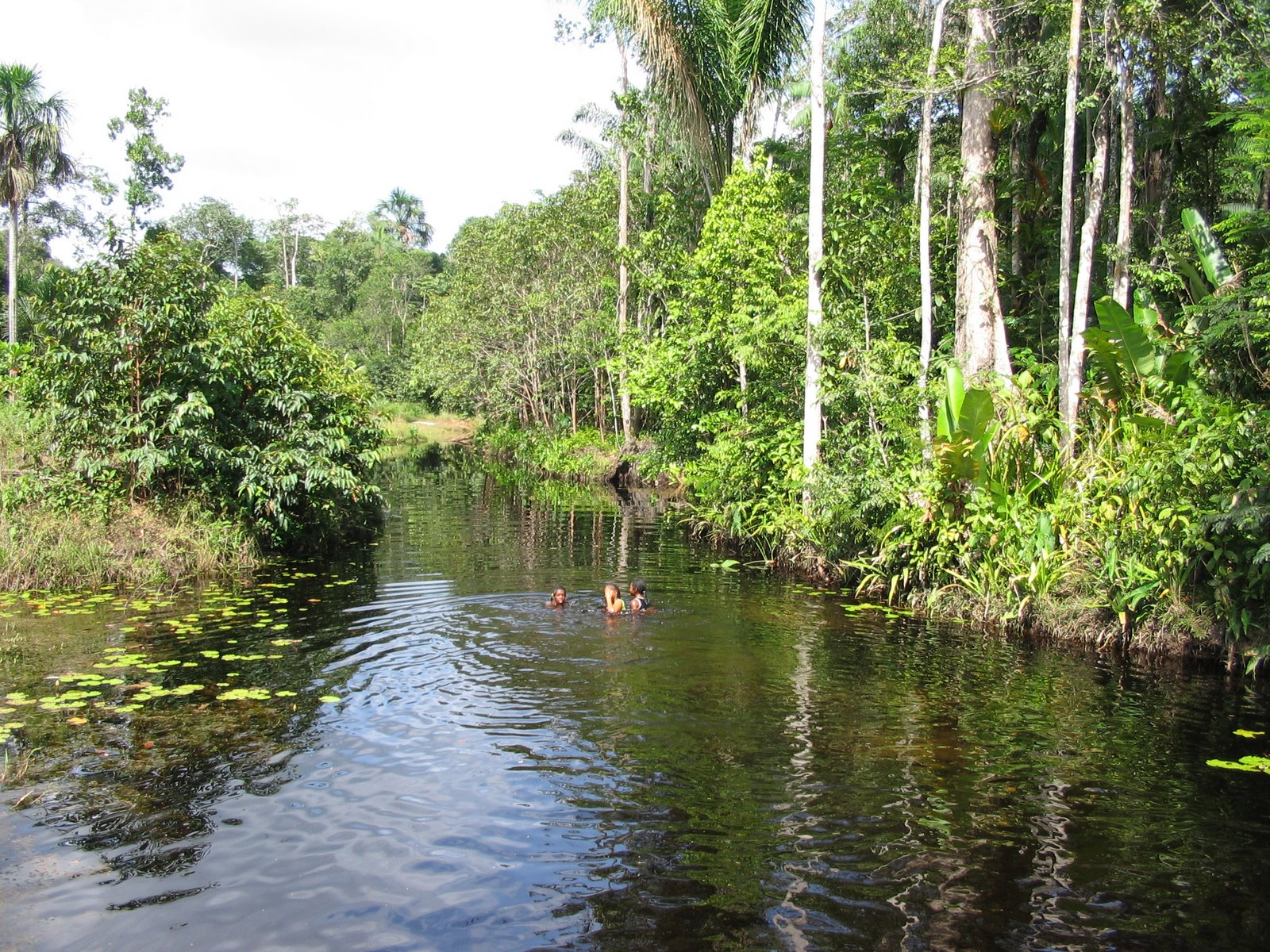
- The black water Cola Creek near Paramaribo

Ecology
- Realm: Neotropical
- Biome: Tropical and subtropical moist broadleaf forests

Geography
- Area: 7,770 km^{2} (3,000 mi^{2})
- Countries: Suriname
- Coordinates: 5.623°N 55.843°W
- Climate type: Af: equatorial, fully humid.

The Paramaribo swamp forests (NT0149) is an ecoregion in the coastal plain of Suriname covering a strip of land that is almost always flooded by fresh waters. It transitions into saline mangrove swamps towards the coast, and into submontane forests towards the interior.

== Geography ==
=== Location ===
Location in Suriname

The Paramaribo swamp forests ecoregion is a long, narrow strip of land between the coastal mangroves and the foothills of the coastal mountains in the north of Suriname. Flora include seasonally flooded forests and permanently flooded swamp forests. It has an area of 777,000 hectares (1,920,000 acres). Most of the population of Suriname lives near the ecoregion, and Paramaribo, the capital of the country, is in the ecoregion.

=== Terrain ===
The ecoregion extends across the north of Suriname from the border with Guyana along the Corantijn River to the border with French Guiana along the Marowijne River. Both Guyana and French Guiana also have elements of swamp forest. The flat coastal plain was formed from marine sediments in the Holocene epoch, and has elevations from 4 to 11 metres (13 to 36 ft) above sea level. The soils are hygromorphic and are almost permanently flooded. In the rainy season the water in the southern areas may be over 3.5 metres (11 ft) deep.

=== Climate ===
The climate is hot and moist. There is a rainy season in December–January, a drier season in February–April, another wet season in May–August and another dry season in August–November. At a sample location at coordinates 5.75°N 55.75°W the Köppen climate classification is "Af": equatorial, fully humid. Mean temperatures range from 25.9 °C (78.6 °F) in January to 27.8 °C (82.0 °F) in September. Total annual rainfall is about 2,200 millimetres (87 in). Monthly rainfall ranges from 70.8 millimetres (2.79 in) in October to 278.7 millimetres (10.97 in) in May.

== Ecology ==
The ecoregion is in the neotropical realm, in the tropical and subtropical moist broadleaf forests biome. The ecoregion is part of the Guianan Moist Forests Global Ecoregion, which also includes the Guianan moist forests and the Orinoco Delta swamp forests. It transitions into the Guianan moist forests ecoregion to the south, and into the Amazon-Orinoco-Southern Caribbean mangroves ecoregion along the coast.

=== Flora ===
The trees are generally shorter and less diverse than the terra firme moist forests further inland. Towards the coast they transition into mangroves. The forests contain many species of flora adapted to the swampy conditions, including several endemic species. Vegetation includes swamp forest, swamp wood, swamp scrub and herbaceous swamp.

The soils are mostly covered in a layer of peat, and peat fires often prevent vegetation from reaching the climax stage. Where fires do not occur, the greatest diversity of flora is found in the shallower swamps. In the shallower northern swamps in the climax phase characteristic trees include baboonwood (Virola surinamensis), chewstick (Symphonia globulifera) and açaí palm (Euterpe oleracea). In the deeper southern swamps there are fewer species of flora. Climax species include Crudia glaberrima, arapari (Macrolobium acaciifolium) and piritu (Bactris maraja).

Swamp woods in shallower waters often contains stands with one or two dominant tree species. These include purple coraltree (Erythrina fusca), dragon blood tree (Pterocarpus officinalis) growing with white cedar (Tabebuia insignis), and paradise plum (Chrysobalanus icaco) growing with pond apple (Annona glabra), buriti palm (Mauritia flexuosa) or mulato tree (Triplaris surinamensis). The northern scrub and herbaceous swamps are often dominated by a few plants such as southern cattail (Typha domingensis), southern cutgrass (Leersia hexandra) and piripiri (Cyperus giganteus) in the north and giant spikerush (Eleocharis interstincta), burr sedge (Lagenocarpus guianensis) and golden beaksedge (Rhynchospora corymbosa) in the south.

=== Fauna ===
The ecoregion has fairly diverse mammals, but no endemic species have been identified. Primates include red-handed tamarin (Saguinus midas), common squirrel monkey (Saimiri sciureus), white-faced saki (Pithecia pithecia), tufted capuchin (Sapajus apella) and Venezuelan red howler (Alouatta seniculus). Other large mammals include West Indian manatee (Trichechus manatus), giant otter (Pteronura brasiliensis) and jaguar (Panthera onca).

The coastal plain is an important breeding, wintering and passage area for waterfowl such as scarlet ibis (Eudocimus ruber) and semipalmated sandpiper (Calidris pusilla). Other birds include chestnut-bellied seed finch (Oryzoborus angolensis), ruddy-breasted seedeater (Sporophila minuta), slate-coloured seedeater (Sporophila schistacea), arrowhead piculet (Picumnus minutissimus), blood-coloured woodpecker (Veniliornis sanguineus) and crimson-hooded manakin (Pipra aureola).

== Status ==
The World Wildlife Fund gives the ecoregion the status of "Vulnerable". The swamp forests are inhospitable, so large areas are fairly intact. However, they can be accessed via the waterways, roads and dykes for the purpose of logging and capturing primates and birds for sale as pets. Threats come from grass and peat fires, draining the swamps for farming, damming the rivers to form reservoirs for agriculture, logging and firewood collection, subsistence hunting, bauxite mining and industry. The forests are also damaged by urban sprawl, roads and canals, exotic plants and agrochemicals. Protected areas include the Galibi, Wia Wia, Peruvia, Boven Coesewijne, Copi, and Wanekreek nature reserves.

== Sources ==
- Guianan Freshwater swamp forests, Myers Enterprises II
- Guianan Moist Forests, WWF Global, archived from the original on 2017-06-05
- Schipper, Jan; Teunissen, Pieter, Northern South America: Northern Suriname, into eastern Guyana and French Guiana (NT0149), WWF: World Wildlife Fund
- WildFinder, WWF: World Wildlife Fund
