= Mariusa National Park =

Venezuelan national park

Mariusa National Park Parque nacional Mariusa
- IUCN category II (national park)
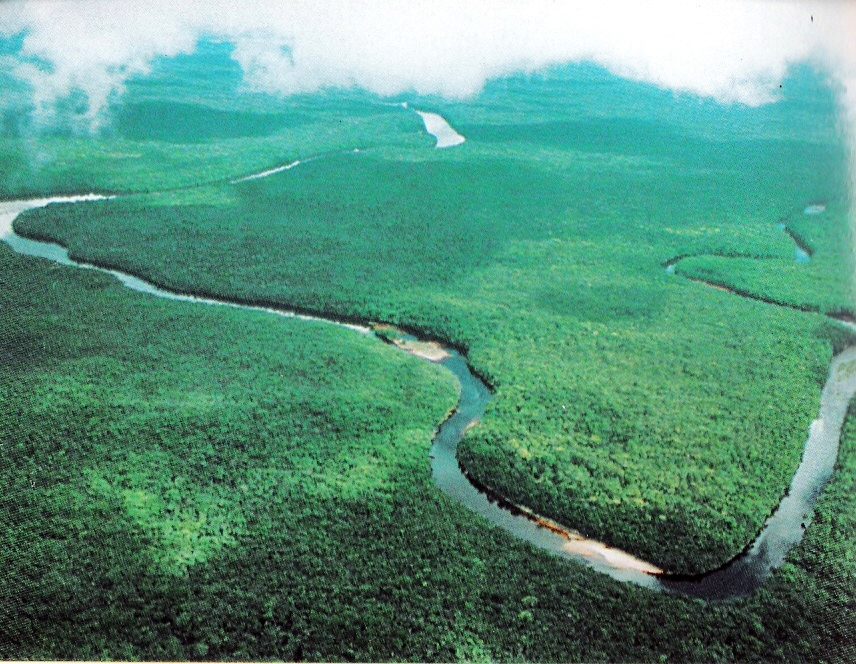

- Location within Venezuela
- Location: Venezuela
- Coordinates: 9°28′N 61°27′W
- Area: 3,310 km^{2} (1,280 sq mi)
- Established: June 5, 1991

The Mariusa National Park (Spanish: Parque nacional Mariusa) (also referred to as Delta del Orinoco National Park) is a protected area of Venezuela with national park status.

== Description ==
The park protects part of the Orinoco Delta swamp forests ecoregion. It is located in the middle of the Orinoco River Delta, where the largest river in Venezuela meets the Atlantic Ocean. It takes the name of the island Mariusa, on the coast, but it is the Redonda Island of the greater territorial extension of land floodable, between the caños of Macareo and Mariusa. The most prominent features of this area are the jungle, with a unique fauna on the planet, and tides that extend through the delta channels. This area is undoubtedly the most special region of all of Venezuela, which, being divided into two main branches called Rio Grande and Brazo Manamo, is completely distributed in the immense delta of the Orinoco River, considered the eighth river in the world.

This territory, dominated mainly by the Waraos, is in the easternmost part of Venezuela and is the product of an immense sedimentary accumulation of quaternary origin; For many centuries the river formed one of the largest deltas in the world and its channel, fed by more than 200 great rivers, traces an arc of 2150 km., Embracing an area near the 40000 km^{2} in the delta, entirely crossed by an infinity Of secondary river mouths called caños.

== See also ==
- List of national parks of Venezuela
- Sierra Nevada National Park (Venezuela)
