= Orinoco Delta swamp forests =

Wetland region of Venezuela and Guyana

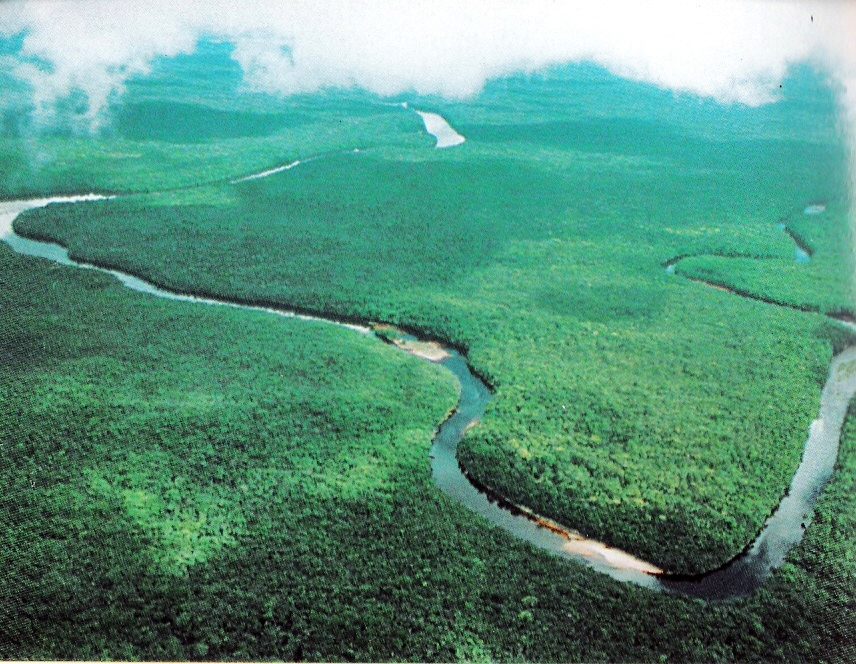
- Aerial view of part of the region

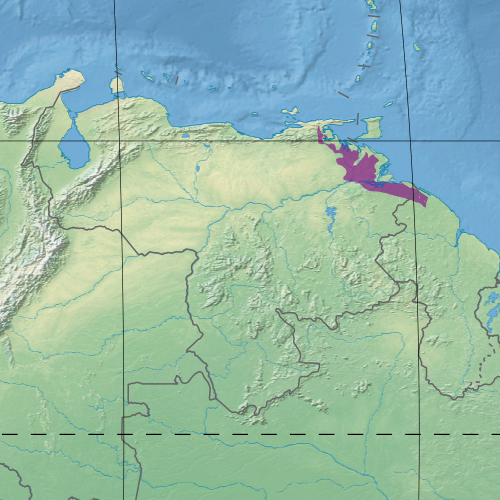
- Ecoregion territory (in purple)

Ecology
- Realm: Neotropical
- Biome: Tropical and subtropical moist broadleaf forests

Geography
- Area: 27,972 km^{2} (10,800 sq mi)
- Country: Guyana, Venezuela
- Coordinates: 9.028°N 61.396°W
- Climate type: Af: equatorial, fully humid

The Orinoco Delta swamp forests (NT0147) is an ecoregion of eastern Venezuela and northern Guyana covering the large and shifting Orinoco Delta. The vegetation is mostly permanently flooded rainforest. The ecoregion is relatively intact apart from a large area that was damaged by a failed flood control program in the 1960s. It is inaccessible, so logging is difficult, and the soil is unsuitable for farming. The main threat comes from oil exploration, which would bring an influx of settlers into the delta.

== Location ==
The Orinoco Delta swamp forests in the lower delta plain of the Orinoco River are one of Earth's largest intact areas of wetlands. They cover an area of 27,972 square kilometres (10,800 sq mi). The forests extend from the base of the Paria Peninsula in the northeast of Venezuela south across the Orinoco Delta floodplain to the Waini River of Guyana.

The ecoregion is bounded on the Gulf of Paria and the Atlantic Ocean by stretches of Amazon-Orinoco-Southern Caribbean mangroves. It contains sections of Orinoco wetlands. To the northwest it adjoins the La Costa xeric shrublands. To the west it adjoins the Llanos and to the south it adjoins the Guianan moist forests.

== Physical ==
The terrain is flat, with typical elevations of 1 metre (3 ft 3 in) above sea level, but in the south there are terra firme levees up to 9 metres (30 ft) high. The soils are alluvial deposits carried by rivers from the Andes of Colombia and Venezuela. The Orinoco fans out into large and small distributaries in the delta, which wind through a landscape of permanent wetlands and marshes, oxbow lakes and levees.

== Climate ==
The Köppen climate classification is "Af": equatorial, fully humid. Annual rainfall varies by location from 500 to 2,000 millimetres (20 to 79 in), and is highest in the south. A wet season generally lasts from April/May to December. At a sample location at coordinates 8.75°N 61.25°W the temperature is relatively stable throughout the year, slightly cooler in January and July and slightly warmer in May and October. Yearly average minimum temperature is 22 °C (72 °F) and maximum is 31 °C (88 °F) with a mean temperature of 27 °C (81 °F). Yearly total rainfall is about 1,450 millimetres (57 in). Average monthly rainfall varies from 40.5 millimetres (1.59 in) in February to 203.7 millimetres (8.02 in) in July.

== Ecology ==
The Orinoco Delta swamp forests are in the Tropical and subtropical moist broadleaf forests biome. The ecoregion is part of the Guianan Moist Forests Global Ecoregion, which also includes the Guianan moist forests and the Paramaribo swamp forests.

=== Flora ===
The Orinoco delta is largely covered by permanently flooded tropical ombrophilous swamp forest, which support various endemic species of plants, with areas of wetlands, mangroves and terra firma rainforest. Most of the vegetation consists of hydrophilous trees and palms, with many epiphytes and scattered herbaceous plants. Hardwood trees include Carapa guianensis, Ceiba pentandra, Dimorphandra excelsa, Hirtella triandra, Inga punctata, Manilkara bidentata, Chlorocardium rodiei, Pentaclethra macroloba, Pterocarpus officinalis, Symphonia globulifera and Terminalia obovata. Palms, often growing in stands of one species, include Astrocaryum aculeatum, açaí palm (Euterpe oleracea), Manicaria saccifera and Mauritia flexuosa.

=== Fauna ===
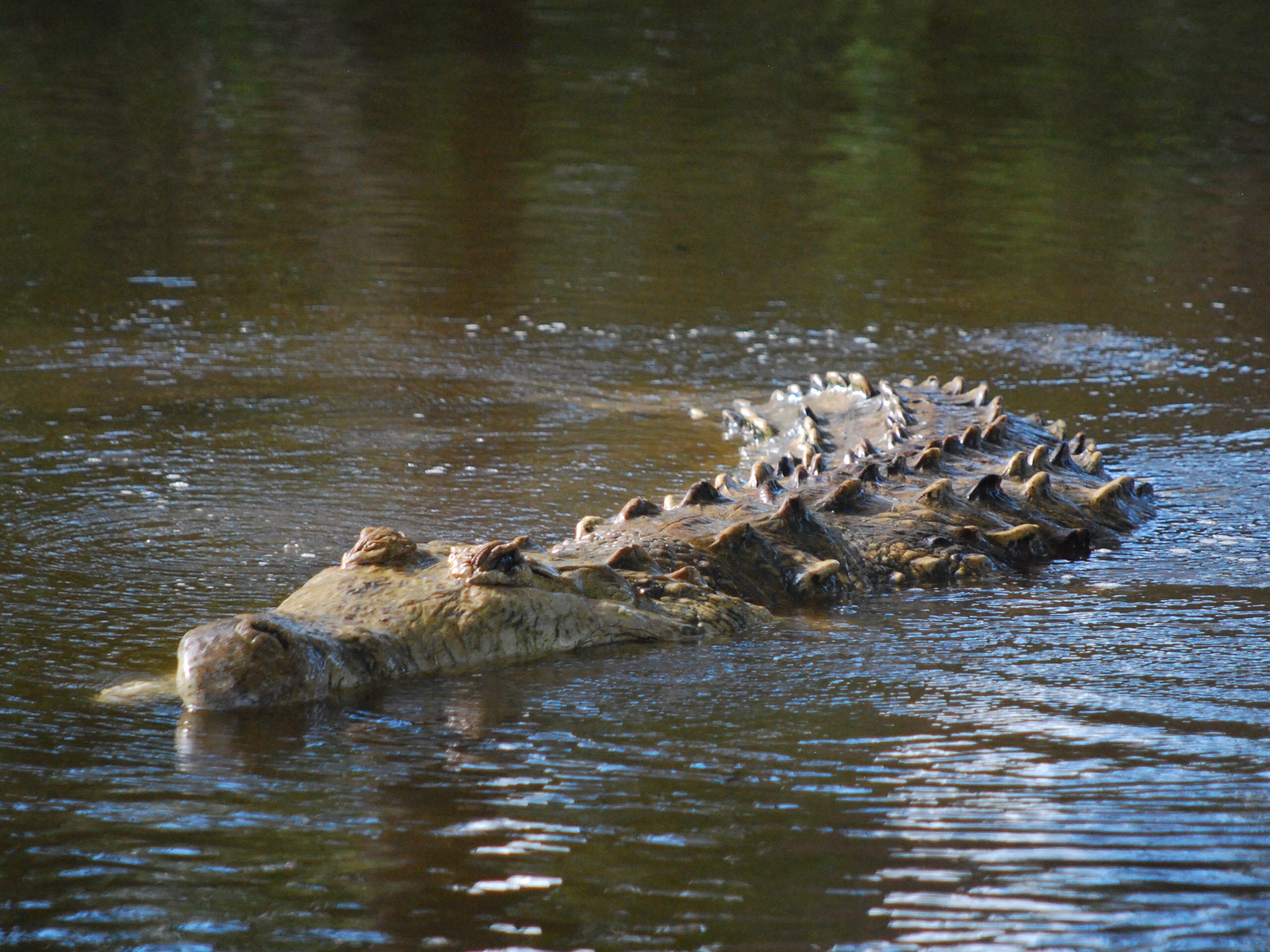
The critically endangered Orinoco crocodile (Crocodylus intermedius)

The swamp forests are home to species that include Orinoco crocodile (Crocodylus intermedius), Amazon river dolphin (Inia geoffrensis), jaguar (Panthera onca), bush dog (Speothos venaticus), giant otter (Pteronura brasiliensis), Orinoco goose (Neochen jubata) and harpy eagle (Harpia harpyja). Endangered species include the Orinoco crocodile, giant otter and yellow-bellied seedeater (Sporophila nigricollis).

== Status ==
The World Wildlife Fund classes the ecoregion as "Relatively Stable/Intact". A flood control program in the 1960s dammed the Caño Manamo, which reduced water levels in the upper delta. This part of the delta became tidal and much more saline than before, with a drastic impact on the flora and fauna. Otherwise the swamp forests are mostly intact.

The highest risk now comes from oil exploration, which would bring more people into the region and cause forest clearance for food and building materials. The way of life of the indigenous Warao people would be disturbed by the newcomers. In some areas the açaí (Euterpe oleracea) and moriche (Mauritia flexuosa) palm trees are over-exploited. Although the region is largely inaccessible, there is growing concern about logging. The cleared land is poor quality and cannot support farming.

There are two indigenous reserves, which do not provide much protection, and several conservation units. The 876,500 hectares (2,166,000 acres) Delta del Orinoco Biosphere Reserve is a sustainable use unit. Part of it covers wetlands. The 3,203,250 hectares (7,915,400 acres) Imataca Forest Reserve is another sustainable use unit with a portion that covers the eastern coastal wetlands. National parks in Venezuela are fully protected, and cover parts of the wetlands and surrounding ecoregions. They include the 331,000 hectares (820,000 acres) Delta del Orinoco National Park, the 72,600 hectares (179,000 acres) Turuépano National Park in the north of the ecoregion and the 265,000 hectares (650,000 acres) Mariusa National Park that protects wetlands along the Caño Macareo.

== Sources ==
- Guianan Moist Forests, WWF Global, archived from the original on 2017-06-05
- "Orinoco Delta swamp forests", Global Species, Meyers Enterprises II
- Schipper, Jan, Northern South America: Northeastern Venezuela and northwestern Guyana (NT0147)
- WildFinder, WWF: World Wildlife Fund
