= Guianan moist forests =

Ecoregion in South America

Guyana moist forests (NT0125)
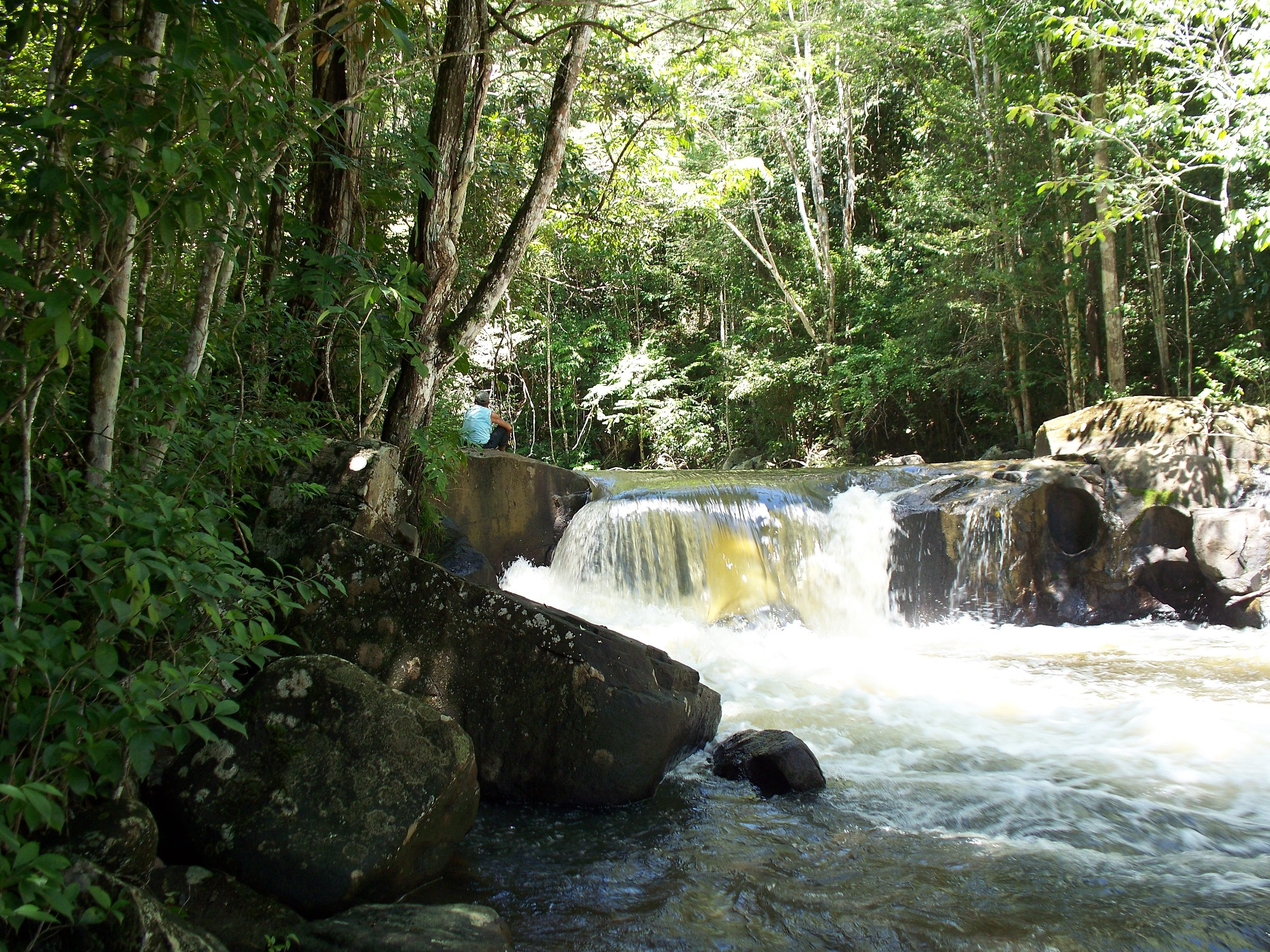
- Waterfall near Paramakatoi, Guyana

- Location in South America

Ecology
- Realm: Neotropical
- Biome: Tropical and subtropical moist broadleaf forests

Geography
- Area: 512,817 km^{2} (198,000 mi^{2})
- Countries: Guyana, Suriname, French Guiana, Venezuela, Brazil
- Coordinates: 3.990°N 57.180°W
- Climate type: Af: equatorial, fully humid

Conservation
- Global 200: Guianan moist forests

The Guianan moist forests (NT0125) is an ecoregion in the east of Venezuela, north of Brazil and the Guyanas (Guyana, Suriname and French Guiana). It is in the Amazon biome. The climate is hot and humid, with two rainy seasons each year. As of 1996 the tropical rainforest habitat was relatively intact, although there were mounting threats from illegal logging and gold mining.

== Location ==
The Guianan moist forests ecoregion covers most of Guyana, Suriname, and French Guiana. It covers part of eastern Venezuela and parts of the north of the Brazilian states of Pará and Amapá. It has a total area of 51,281,764 hectares (126,720,000 acres).

Along the Atlantic coast to the east and northeast the ecoregion adjoins strips of Guianan freshwater swamp forests, Amazon-Orinoco-Southern Caribbean mangroves and Orinoco Delta swamp forests. To the northwest it adjoins the Llanos ecoregion, the Guianan piedmont and lowland moist forests and Guianan Highlands moist forest. Scattered patches of this last ecoregion are found on higher ground within the Guianan moist forests ecoregion. To the southwest and in places along its southern border it adjoins large areas of Guianan savanna. Most of the southern border adjoins the Uatuma-Trombetas moist forests.

== Physical ==
The ecoregion lies to the east of the lower Orinoco basin and covers about 65% of the northeast part of the ancient Guiana Shield. It is bounded to the south by the line of the Acarai and Tumuk Humak mountains, which defines the rim of the Amazon basin and the northern border of Brazil. A small part of the ecoregion in the east is in the lower Amazon basin. The Essequibo, Courantyne, Maroni and Oyapock rivers run through the region to the Atlantic Ocean.

The terrain is mostly plains or low hills, with some steep slopes in river valleys and the bases of tepuis. In the west-central area the ecoregion surrounds the Pacaraima Mountains, a sandstone plateau with an average elevation of 1,000 metres (3,300 ft). It also surrounds tepuis, or tabletop mountains, the highest being Mount Roraima with an elevation of 2,810 metres (9,220 ft). The highlands and tepuis have a distinct tepui ecosystem.

== Ecology ==
The Guianan moist forests ecoregion is in the Neotropical realm and the tropical and subtropical moist broadleaf forests biome. The ecoregion is part of the Guianan Moist Forests Global Ecoregion, which also includes the Paramaribo swamp forests and the Orinoco Delta swamp forests.

=== Climate ===
The Köppen climate classification is "Af": equatorial, fully humid. The northeastern trade winds carry humidity from the Atlantic Ocean, fluctuating annually due to the effects of the Intertropical Convergence Zone (doldrums). Annual rainfall ranges from 2,000 to 4,000 millimetres (79 to 157 in), with two rainy seasons in December–January and May–August. At a sample location (4.25°N 56.25°W) in the Central Suriname Nature Reserve temperatures vary little throughout the year, slightly warmer in October and slightly cooler in January. Yearly average temperatures are minimum 21.5 °C (70.7 °F) and maximum 30.5 °C (86.9 °F) with a mean of 26 °C (79 °F). Annual rainfall is 2,700 millimetres (110 in). Monthly rainfall varies from 54.3 millimetres (2.14 in) in October to 406.3 millimetres (16.00 in) in May.

=== Flora ===
The ecoregion is mainly covered by lowland or submontane rainforest, including marsh forest along the rivers. There are an estimated 8,000 vascular plant species, of which half may be endemic. The plant species in the forests change from east to west, with species dominant in one area completely missing from another. There are also patches of savanna, and the coastal lowlands have patches of herbaceous swamp. The flora is diverse. The upper tiers of the forest may reach a height of 40 metres (130 ft). The trees are mainly evergreen, but may shed leaves in the dry season. The trees hold many epiphytes and parasites, and shrubs and herbaceous plants cover the forest floor.

The main plant families are Bignoniaceae, Bombacaceae, Euphorbiaceae, Moraceae, Sterculiaceae, Lauraceae, Vochysiaceae, Sapotaceae, Lecythidaceae, Fabaceae, Combretaceae, Anacardiaceae, Rubiaceae, Meliaceae, Sapindaceae, Annonaceae and Arecaceae. Common species include Calophyllum brasiliense, Carapa guianensis, Ceiba pentandra, Couroupita guianensis, Eschweilera species, Guarea trichiloides, Luehea species, Parkia pendula, Pentaclethra macroloba, Protium species, Schwartzia species and Trichilia species. Cedrela fissilis, Coumourana punctata, Coumourana punctata and Warszewiczia coccinea are common in some areas but are not found in Suriname.

There are centers of plant diversity in the south and in the Saül region of central French Guiana. The Saul region is a dry belt of semi-open forest and patches of savanna that are more characteristic of the Guayana Lowland province. This region has more than 150 endemic vascular plants, with plants adapted to moderate temperatures in the higher areas and along watercourses. There are many palm species including Astrocaryum mumbaca, Astrocaryum munbaca, Maximiliana maripa, Iriartea excrrhiza and Bactris sphaerocarpa, which is not found in Suriname.

The forests contain patches of savanna, particularly in Suriname, which may be remnants of the savanna that covered all of Suriname in the Pleistocene epoch apart from the river valleys and the high-altitude refugia of rainforest. In the early Holocene epoch the climate changed to favor the present rainforest, and remnants of savanna now cover just 1% of Suriname. There are more than 800 species of savanna plants.

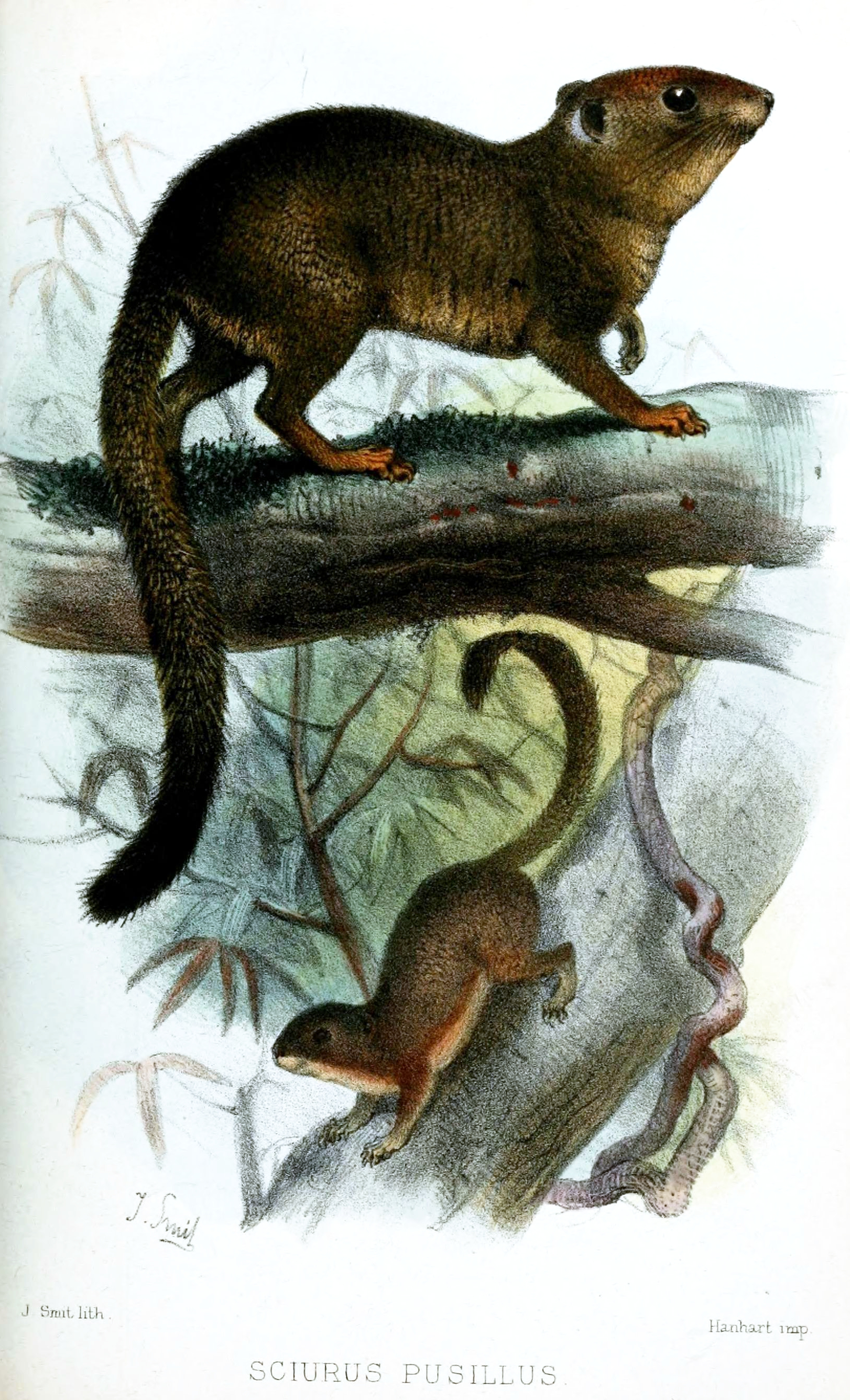
The Neotropical pygmy squirrel (Sciurillus pusillus) is endemic.

=== Fauna ===
More than 220 species of mammals have been identified in Guyana alone, of which more than 100 are bats. Endemic species include rufous mouse opossum (Marmosa lepida), six-banded armadillo (Euphractus sexcinctus), red-handed tamarin (Saguinus midas), white-faced saki (Pithecia pithecia), red-faced spider monkey (Ateles paniscus), Neotropical pygmy squirrel (Sciurillus pusillus), delicate pygmy rice rat (Oligoryzomys delicatus), Guiana bristly mouse (Neacomys guianae), Bahia porcupine (Coendou insidiosus), white-faced spiny tree-rat (Echimys chrysurus), Schultz's round-eared bat (Lophostoma schulzi), and rufous dog-faced bat (Molossops neglectus). Endangered mammals include the black bearded saki (Chiropotes satanas) and giant otter (Pteronura brasiliensis).

There are many birds species, often the same as in the Guyana Highlands and northern Andes, such as Guianan cock-of-the-rock (Rupicola rupicola), or the Amazon lowlands, such as hoatzin (Opisthocomus hoazin). Raptors include harpy eagle (Harpia harpyja) and crested eagle (Morphnus guianensis). Endangered birds include the sun parakeet (Aratinga solstitialis) and yellow-bellied seedeater (Sporophila nigricollis).

Reptiles include the threatened black caiman (Melanosuchus niger) and yellow-spotted river turtle (Podocnemis unifilis). There are diverse amphibians in the families Hylidae, Dendrobatidae and Leptodactylidae.

== Status ==
The World Wildlife Fund classes the ecoregion as "Relatively Stable/Intact". As of 1996 relatively little deforestation had occurred, and conservation efforts were being made, but apart from Suriname there were few conservation areas and rising human pressure on the environment. Guyana is a major exporter of wild birds. The main threats come from illegal gold mining and logging along the unpoliced borders between the Guyanas and Venezuela and Brazil. A mounting drive to promote tourism might motivate the people to preserve the environment as a source of revenue.

IUCN protected area category II (National Park) conservation units include the Kaieteur National Park in Guyana and the Brownsberg Nature Park in Suriname. Other protected areas include the Imataca Forest Reserve, Iwokrama Forest Reserve and Raleigh Falls - Voltzberg Nature Reserve.

== Sources ==
- "Guianan moist forests", Global Species, Myers Enterprises II, archived from the original on 2017-03-17
- Guianan Moist Forests, WWF Global, archived from the original on 2017-06-05
- Schipper, Jan; Teunissen, Pieter; Lim, Burton, Northern South America: Guyana, Suriname, French Guiana, northern Brazil, and eastern Venezuela (NT0125)
- WildFinder, WWF: World Wildlife Fund
