= Llanos =

Tropical grassland ecoregion in Colombia and Venezuela

Coordinates: 6°49′23″N 67°38′57″W

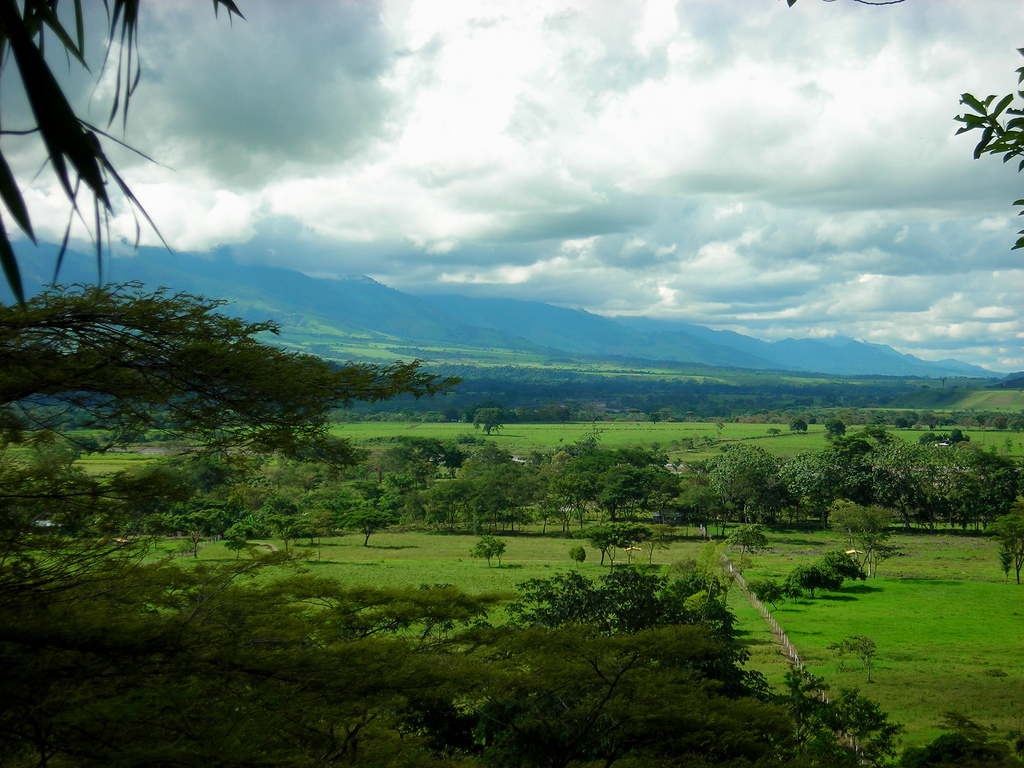
- The Llanos in Colombia

- Location of the Llanos

Ecology
- Realm: Neotropical
- Biome: tropical and subtropical grasslands, savannas, and shrublands
- Borders: List: Apure–Villavicencio dry forests; Guianan lowland moist forests; Guianan piedmont and lowland moist forests; La Costa xeric shrublands; Orinoco wetlands; Negro-Branco moist forests

Geography
- Area: 375,786 km^{2} (145,092 mi^{2})
- Countries: Colombia; Venezuela

Conservation
- Conservation status: Vulnerable
- Protected: 105,323 km² (28%)

The Llanos (Spanish: Los Llanos, 'The Plains', pronounced [los ˈʝanos]) is a vast tropical grassland plain situated to the east of the Andes in Colombia and Venezuela, in northwestern South America. It is an ecoregion of the tropical and subtropical grasslands, savannas, and shrublands biome.

== Geography ==
The Llanos occupy a lowland that extends mostly east and west. The Llanos are bounded on the west and northwest by the Andes, and on the north by the Venezuelan Coastal Range. The Guiana Highlands are to the southeast, and the Negro-Branco moist forests are to the southwest. To the east the Orinoco wetlands and Orinoco Delta swamp forests occupy the Orinoco Delta. The Llanos' main river is the Orinoco, which runs from west to east through the ecoregion and forms part of the Colombia–Venezuela border. The Orinoco is the major river system of Venezuela.

A 2017 assessment found that 105,323 km², or 28%, of the ecoregion, is in protected areas. Protected areas include Aguaro-Guariquito National Park (5,857.5 km²), Cinaruco-Capanaparo National Park (5,843.68 km²), Tortuga Arrau Reserve (98.56 km²), and Caño Guaritico Wildlife Refuge (93.0 km²) in Venezuela, and El Tuparro National Natural Park (5,549.08 km²) in Colombia.

== Climate ==
The ecoregion has a tropical savanna climate that grades into a tropical monsoon climate in the Colombian Llanos. Rainfall is seasonal, with a rainy season from April to November, and a dry season between December and March. The wettest months are typically June and July. Rainfall varies across the ecoregion, from up to 3,000 millimetres (120 in) per year in the southwest, 1,200 to 1,600 millimetres (47 to 63 in) in Apure State, and 800 to 1,200 millimetres (31 to 47 in) per year in Monagas State in the northeast. Mean annual temperature is 27 °C or 80.6 °F, and the average monthly temperature varies little throughout the year; the lowest-temperature months (June, July, December, and January) are only 2 °C or 3.6 °F cooler than the hottest months.

== Flora ==
The plant communities in the Llanos include open grasslands, savanna with scattered trees or clumps of trees, and small areas of forest, typically gallery forests along rivers and streams. There are seasonally flooded grasslands and savannas (llano bajo) and grasslands and savannas that remain dry throughout the year (llano alto).

The llano alto grasslands and savannas are characterized by grasses and shrubs 30–100 cm high, forming tussocks 10 to 30 cm apart. Soils are typically sandy and nutrient-poor. Llano alto covers approximately two-thirds of the Venezuelan llanos and is also widespread in the Colombian llanos. Grasses of genus Trachypogon are predominant, and species include Trachypogon plumosus, T. vestitus, Axonopus canescens, A. anceps, Andropogon selloanus, Aristida spp., Leptocoryphium lanatum, Paspalum carinatum, Sporobolus indicus, and S. cubensis, and sedges in the genera Rhynchospora and Bulbostylis. Shrubs and herbs are most commonly legumes in the genera Mimosa, Cassia, Desmodium, Eriosema, Galactia, Indigofera, Phaseolus, Stylosanthes, Tephrosia, and Zornia. The trees manteco (Byrsonima crassifolia), chaparro (Curatella americana), and alcornoque (Bowdichia virgilioides) are the most common, growing either as scattered trees or in woodland patches known as matas which range in area from 12 meters in diameter up to a hectare.

During the rainy season, parts of the Llanos can flood up to a meter. This turns some savannas and grasslands into temporary wetlands, comparable to the Pantanal of central South America. This flooding creates habitat for water birds and other wildlife. These seasonally flooded grasslands and savannas, known as llano bajo, typically have richer soils. They are characterized by the grass Paspalum fasciculatum. Trees include the palm Copernicia tectorum and gallery forest species.

Gallery forests include evergreen seasonally flooded forests, and semi-deciduous forests on higher ground. Morichales are seasonally flooded forests characterized by the moriche palm (Mauritia flexuosa). Vegas are seasonally flooded evergreen forests found along the Orinoco and its tributaries. Trees form a canopy 8 to 20 meters high and include Inga spp., Combretum frangulifolium, Gustavia augusta, Pterocarpus sp., Pterocarpus dubius, Spondias mombin, and Copaifera pubiflora. Semi-deciduous forests occur above flood level and form a canopy 12 to 15 meters high. Common trees include Tabebuia billbergii, Godmania aesculifolia, Cassia moschata, Spondias mombin, Copaifera pubiflora, Bourreria cumanensis, Cordia spp., Bursera simaruba, Cochlospermum vitifolium, Hura crepitans, and Acacia glomerosa.

"Matorrales" are deciduous and semi-deciduous shrublands 5 to 8 meters high which cover large areas in the central Venezuelan llanos and may be a form of secondary vegetation in areas that were formerly dry deciduous forest. Typical shrubs are Bourreria cumanensis, Randia aculeata, Godmania aesculifolia, Pereskia guamacho, Prosopis spp., Xylosma benthamii, Erytroxylum sp., and Cereus hexagonus.

== Fauna ==
Mammals of the grassland and savanna include white-tailed deer (Odocoileus virginianus), giant anteater (Myrmecophaga tridactyla), capybara (Hydrochoerus hydrochaeris), giant armadillo (Priodontes maximus), Eastern cottontail (Sylvilagus floridanus), Alston's cotton rat (Sigmodon alstoni), Hispid cotton rat (S. hispidus), Zygodontomys brevicauda, and Oecomys bicolor.

The gallery forests are home to more diverse large and medium-sized mammals, including collared peccary (Tayassu tajacu), white-lipped peccary (T. pecari), South American tapir (Tapirus terrestris), white-tailed deer, red brocket (Mazama americana), wedge-capped capuchin (Cebus olivaceus), Venezuelan red howler (Alouatta seniculus), large rodents like the lowland paca (Cuniculus paca), agoutis (Dasyprocta spp.), and Brazilian porcupine (Coendou prehensilis), and large cats like the puma (Puma concolor), jaguar (Panthera onca), and ocelot (Leopardus pardalis). The endangered giant otter (Pteronura brasiliensis) lives along the Orinoco and its tributaries. Some of the largest jaguars in the world are found in the Llanos, with average weights of over 100 kg (220 lb) for males. The Llanos long-nosed armadillo (Dasypus sabanicola) and the short-tailed opossum Monodelphis orinoci are endemic to the Llanos.

The wetlands support around 70 species of water birds, including the scarlet ibis. A large portion of the distribution of the sharp-tailed ibis (Cercibis oxycerca) and white-bearded flycatcher (Phelpsia inornata) is in the Llanos. Native reptiles include the Orinoco crocodile (Crocodylus intermedius), spectacled caiman (Caiman crocodilus), Green anaconda (Eunectes murinus), and Arrau turtle (Podocnemis expansa).

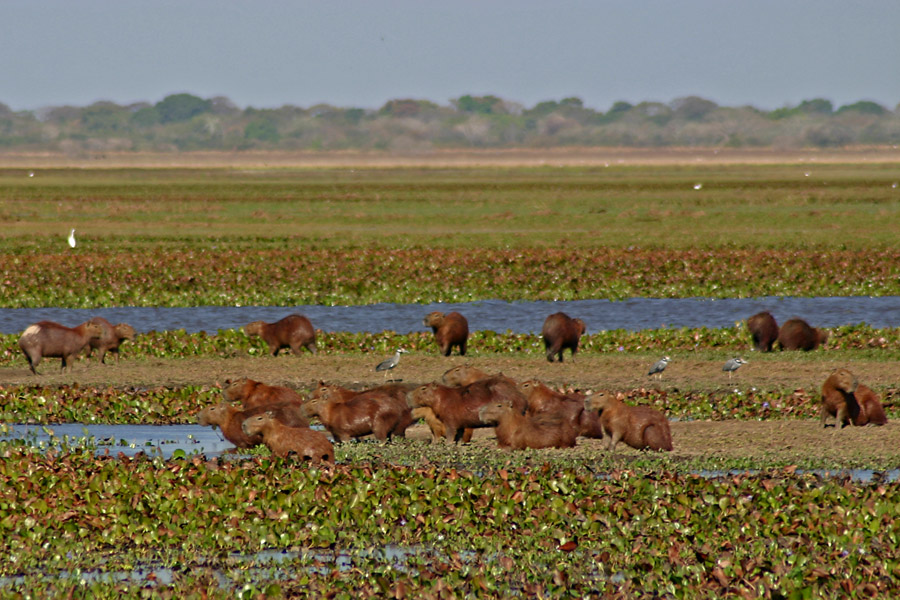
A group of capybaras at Hato La Fe, Venezuela

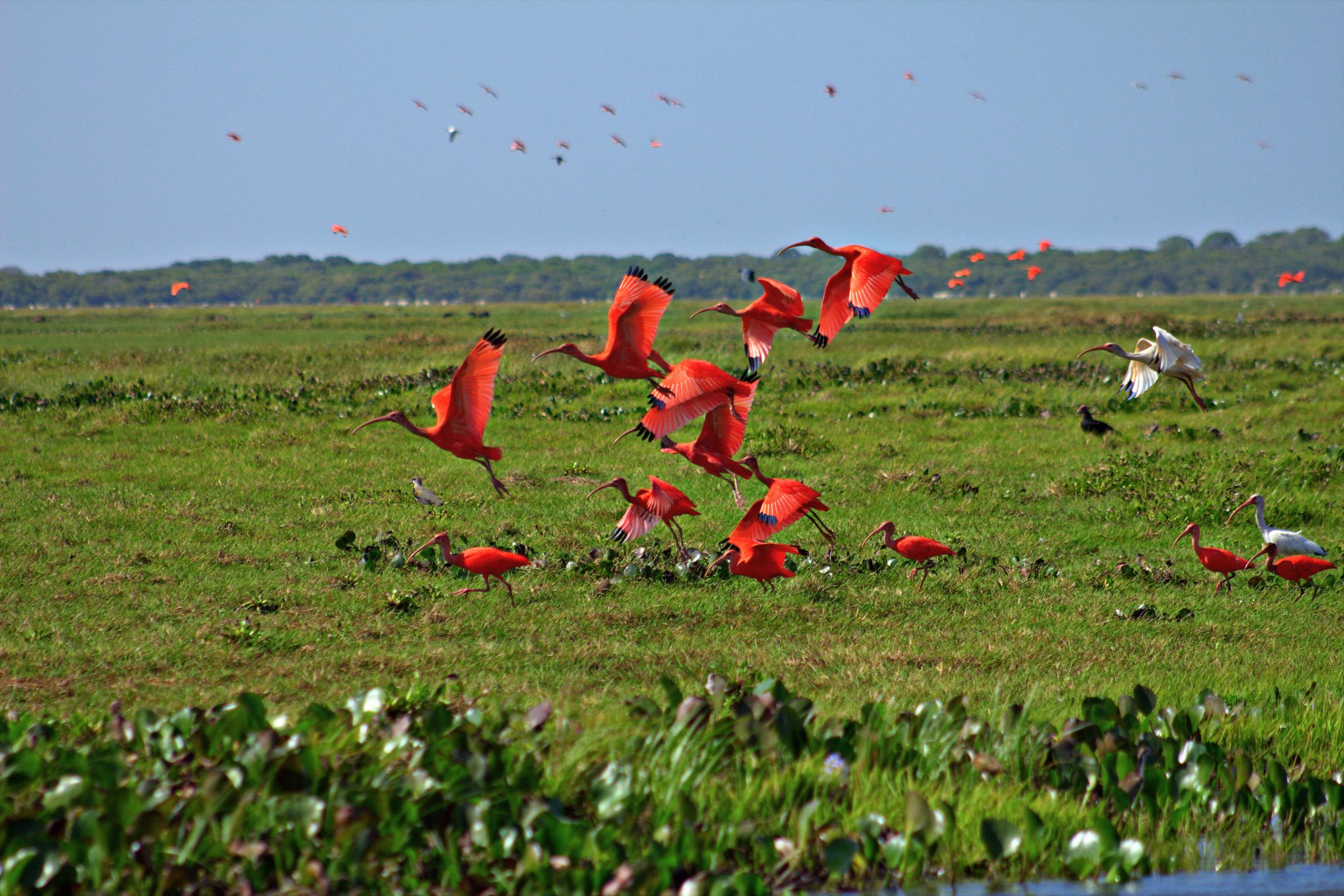
A flock of scarlet ibis in Apure, Venezuela

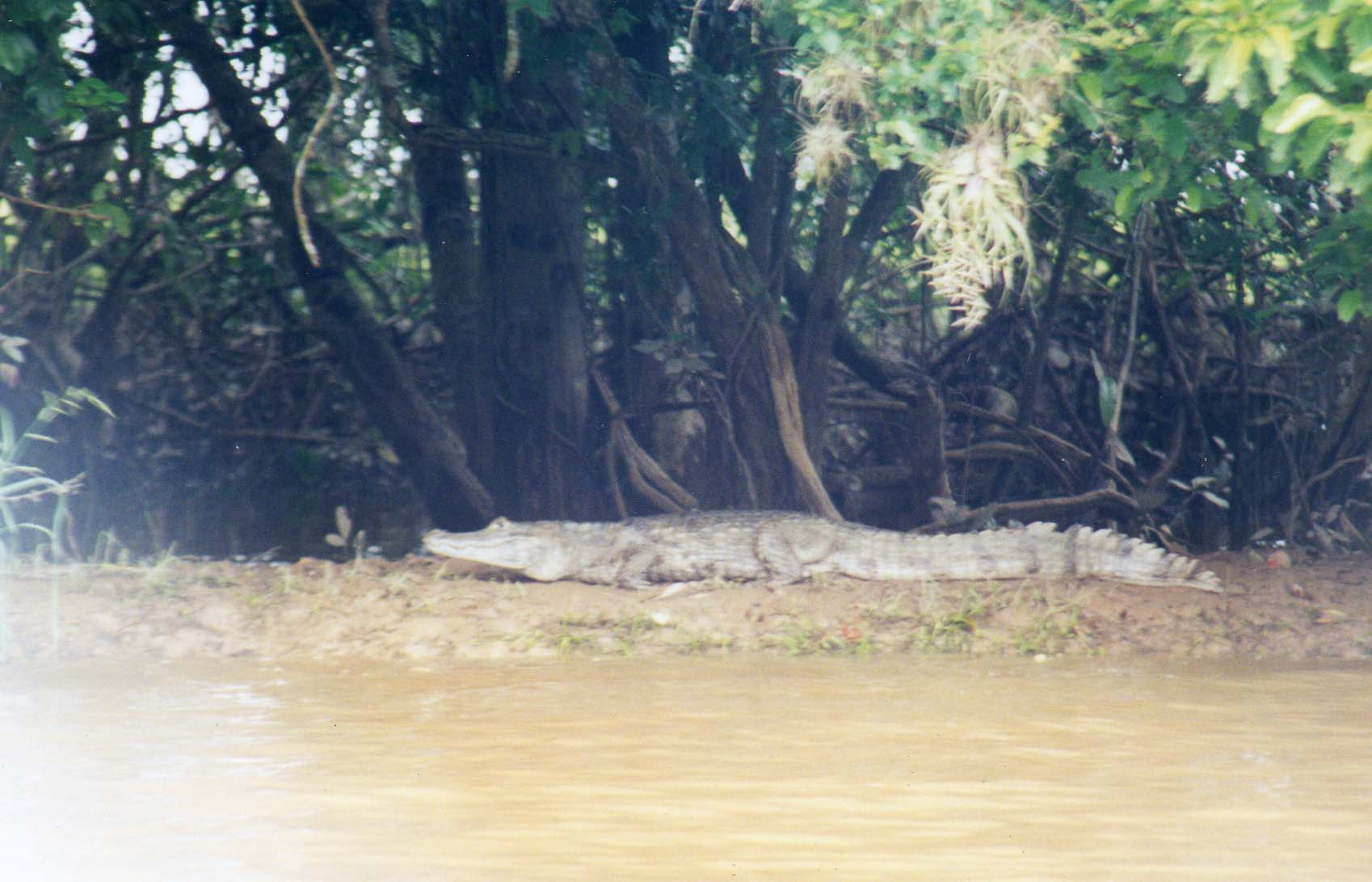
Spectacled caiman, Guaratico River, Venezuela

== Indigenous peoples ==
Indigenous peoples of the Llanos include the Guahibo in the western Llanos of Colombia and Venezuela, and the Yaruro in the eastern Llanos in Venezuela.

== Economy ==
The primary economic activity since the Spanish colonial era is the herding of millions of cattle. An 1856 watercolor by Manuel María Paz depicts sparsely populated open grazing lands with cattle and palm trees. The term llanero ("plainsman") became synonymous with the cowhands that took care of the herds and had some cultural similarities with the gauchos of the Pampas or the vaqueros of Spanish and Mexican Texas. Decades of extensive cattle raising has altered the ecology of the Llanos. Grasslands and savannas are frequently burned to make them more suitable for grazing and eliminate trees and shrubs. Non-native grasses have been introduced for cattle fodder, including the African grass Melinis minutiflora, and now cover large areas. Agriculture, particularly rice and maize, now cover extensive areas, including rice fields in former seasonal wetlands.

The governments of Venezuela and Colombia have developed a strong oil and gas industry in Arauca, Casanare, Guárico, Anzoátegui, Apure, and Monagas. The Orinoco Belt, entirely in Venezuelan territory, consists of large deposits of extra heavy crude (oil sands). The Orinoco Belt oil sands are known to be one of the largest, behind that of the Athabasca Oil Sands in Alberta, Canada. Venezuela's non-conventional oil deposits of about 1,200 billion barrels (1.9×10^{11} m^{3}), found primarily in the Orinoco oil sands, are estimated to approximately equal the world's conventional oil reserves.

== Gallery ==
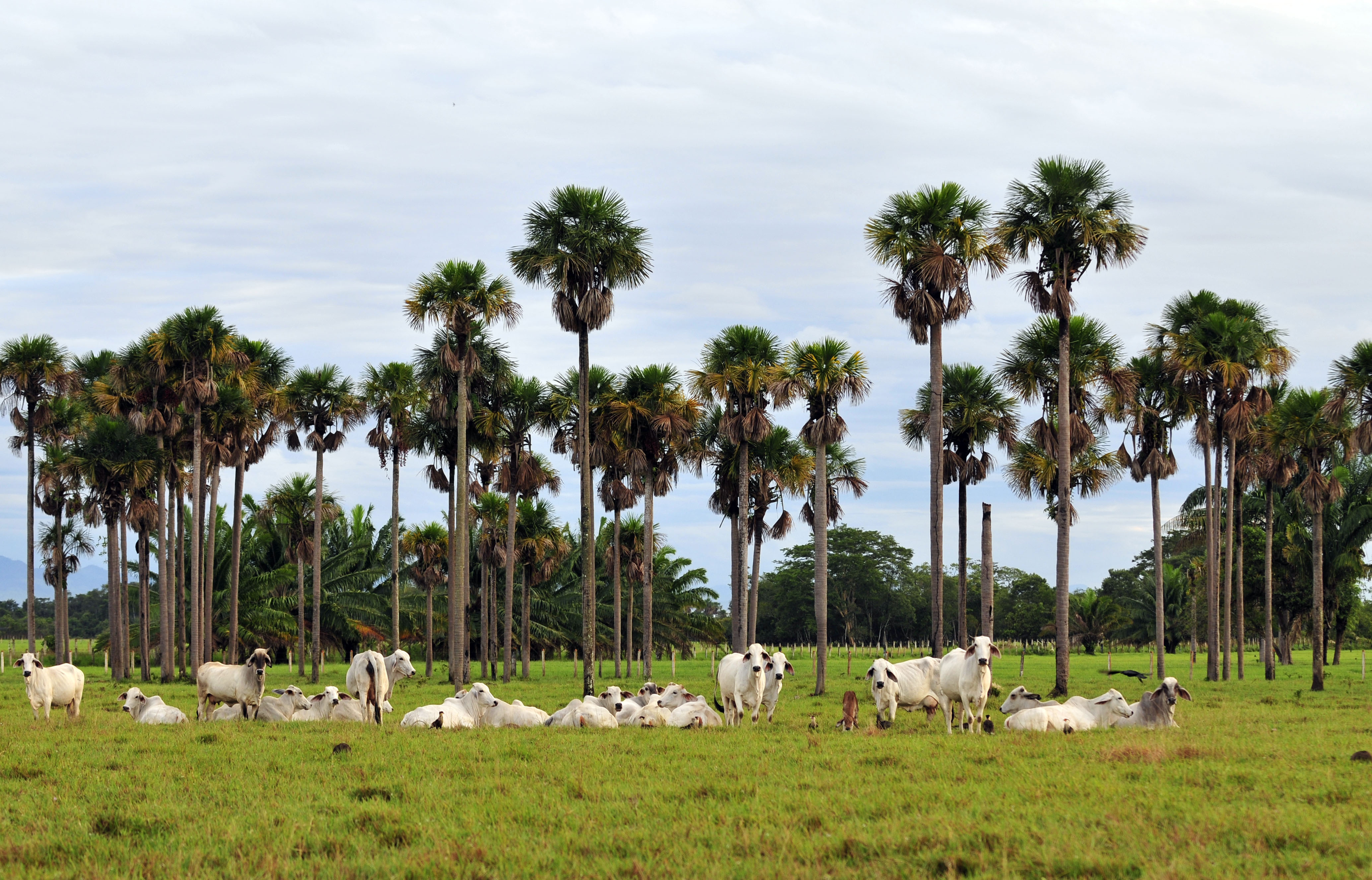
Colombia

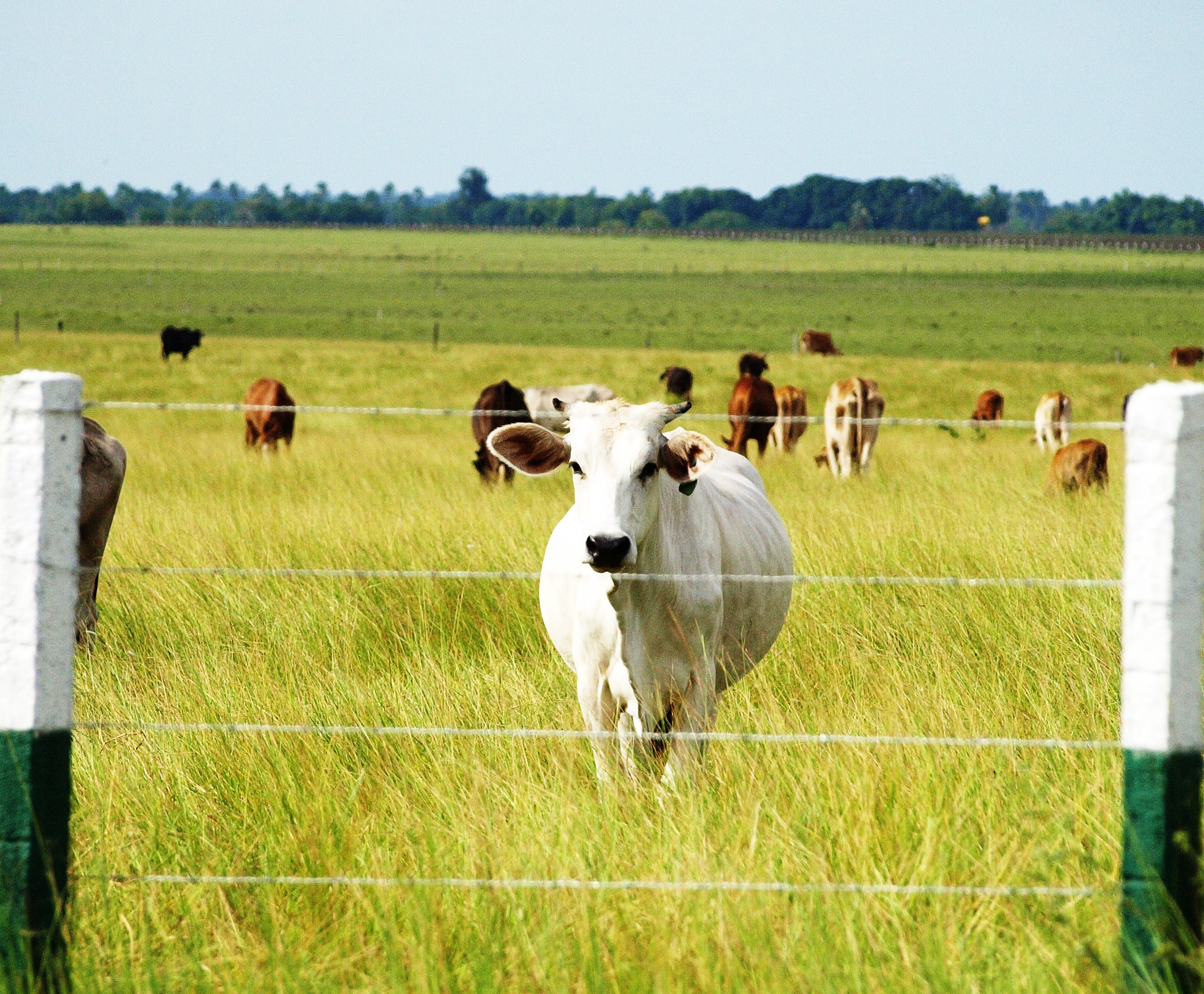
Venezuela

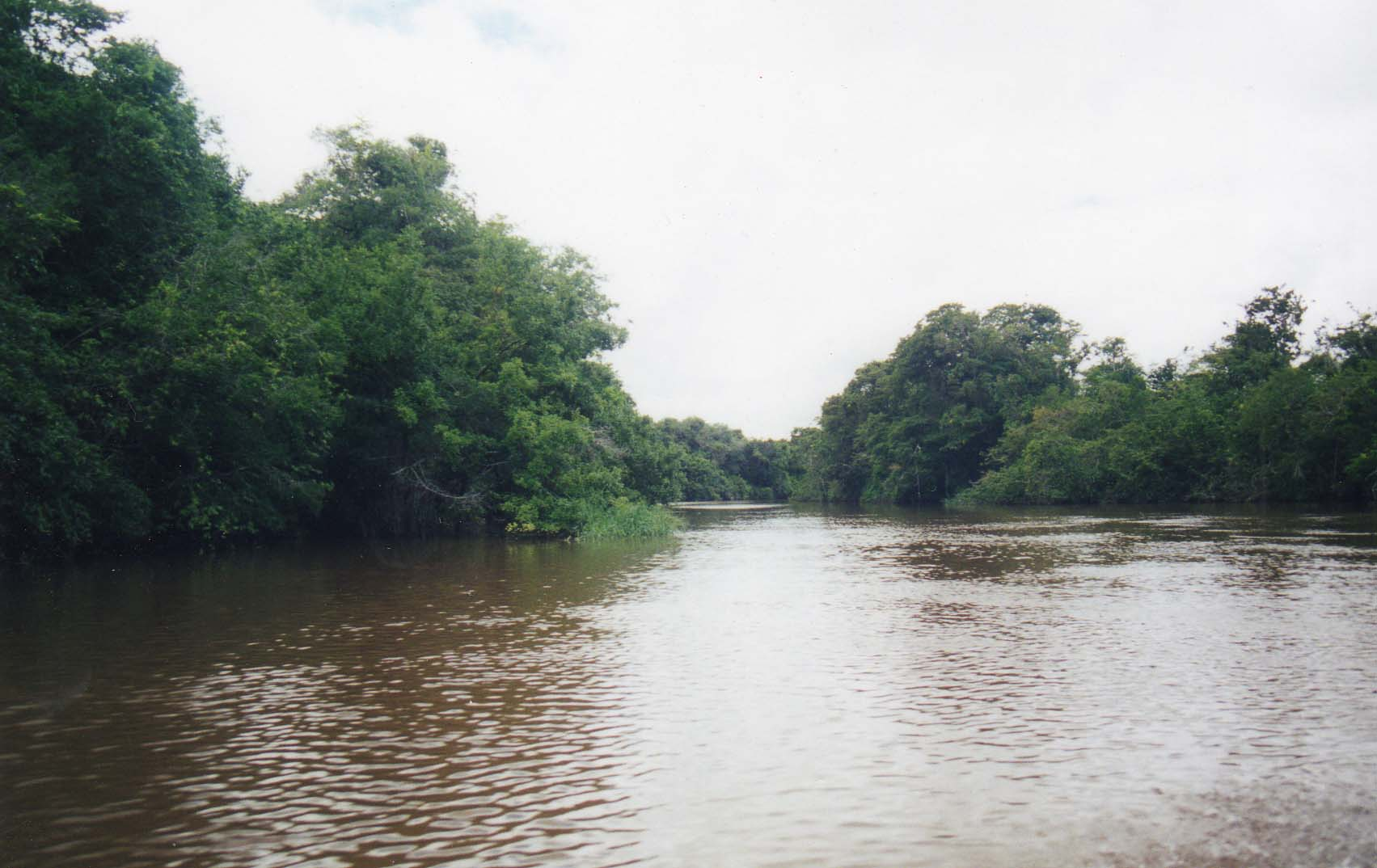
The Guaratico River near Mantecal, Venezuela

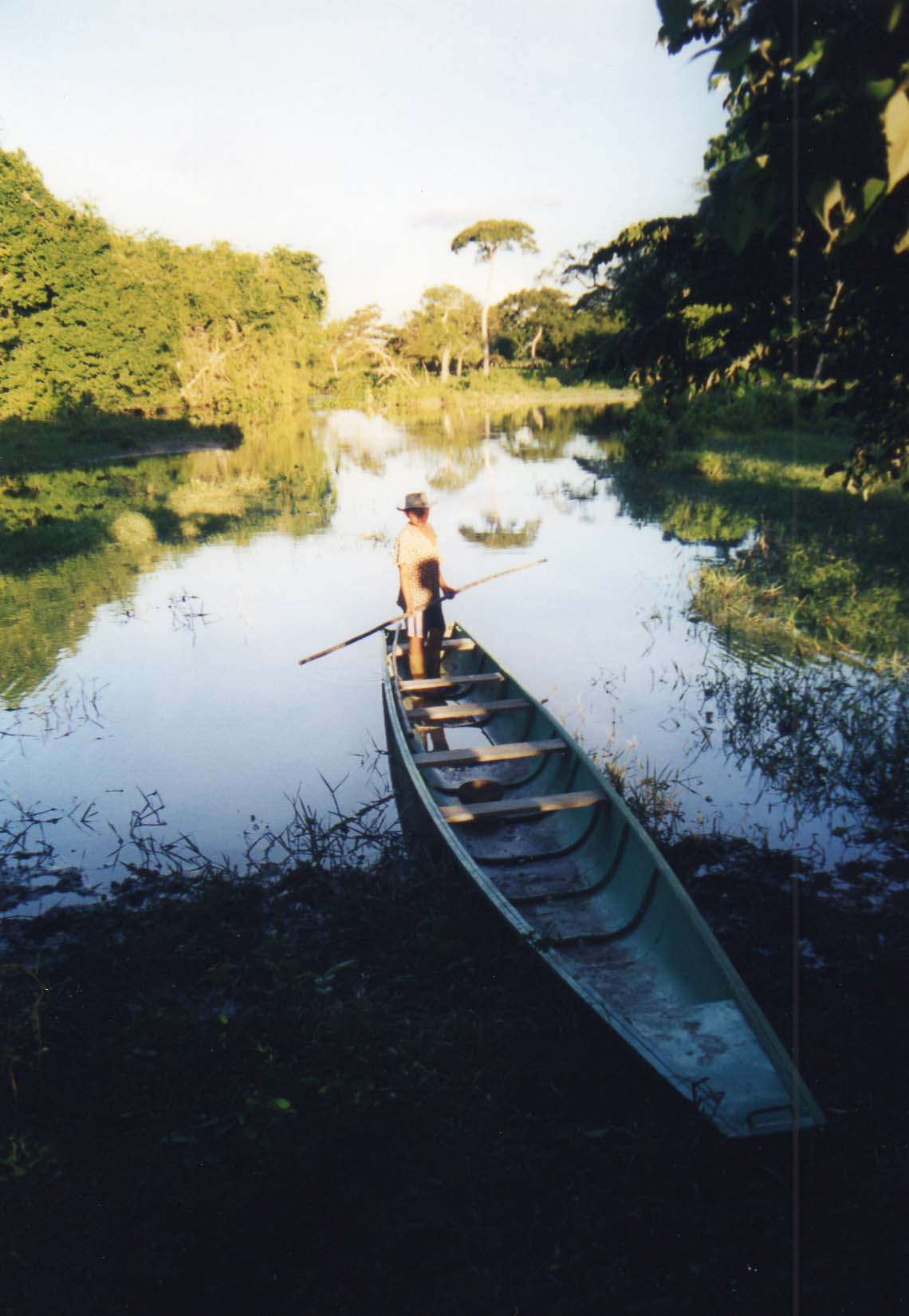
Tourist metal bongo on the Guaratico River

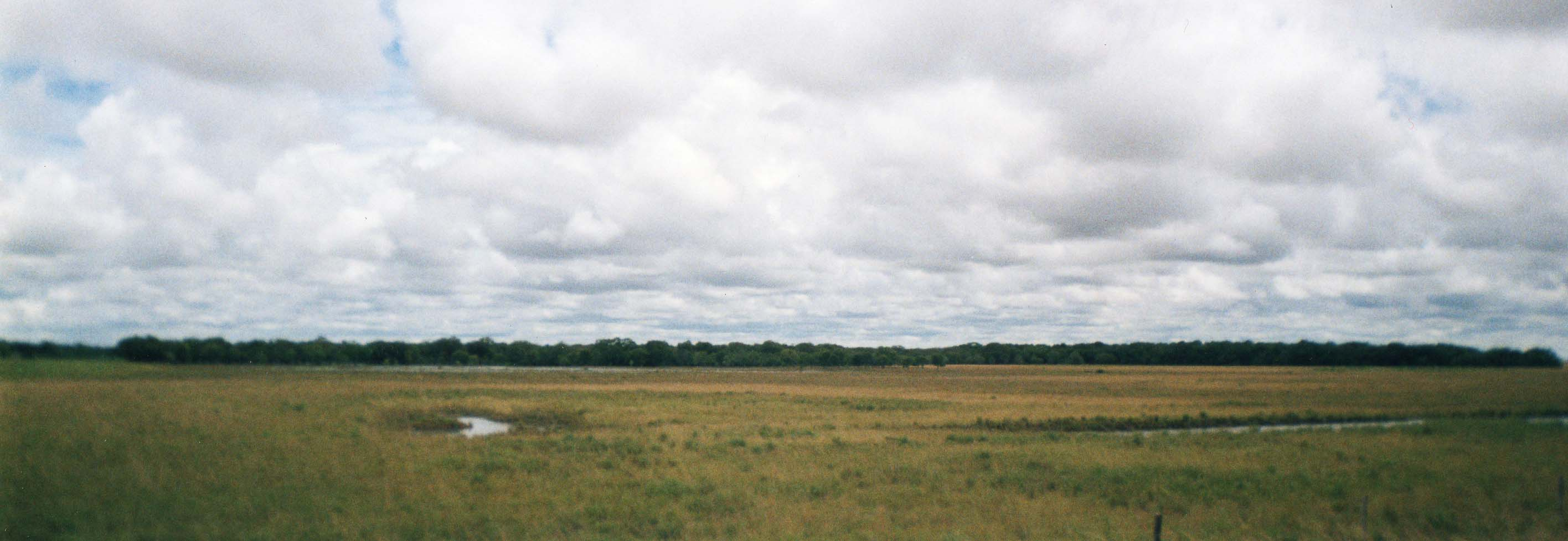
The flat, expansive Llanos

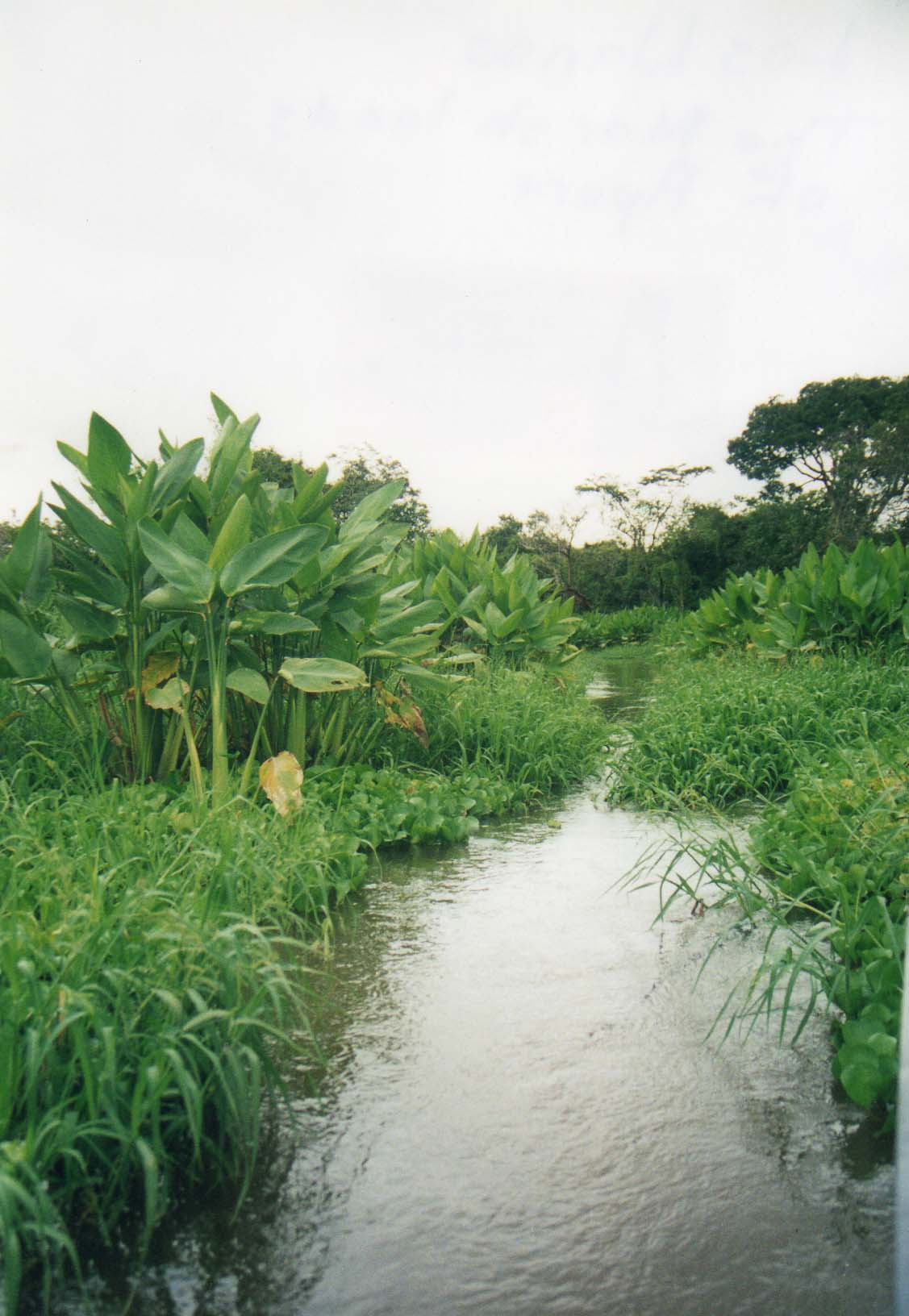
Wet season

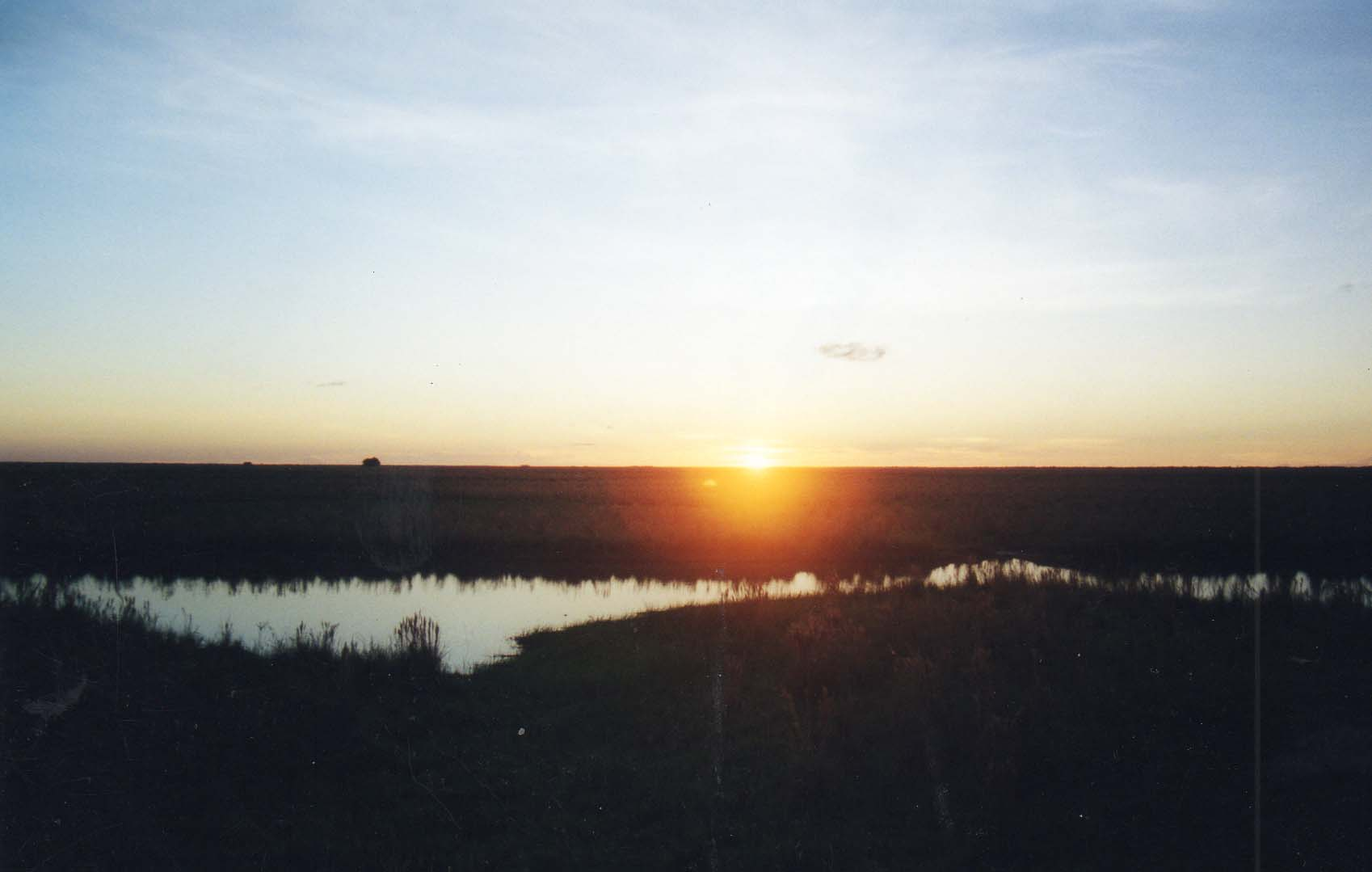
Sunset

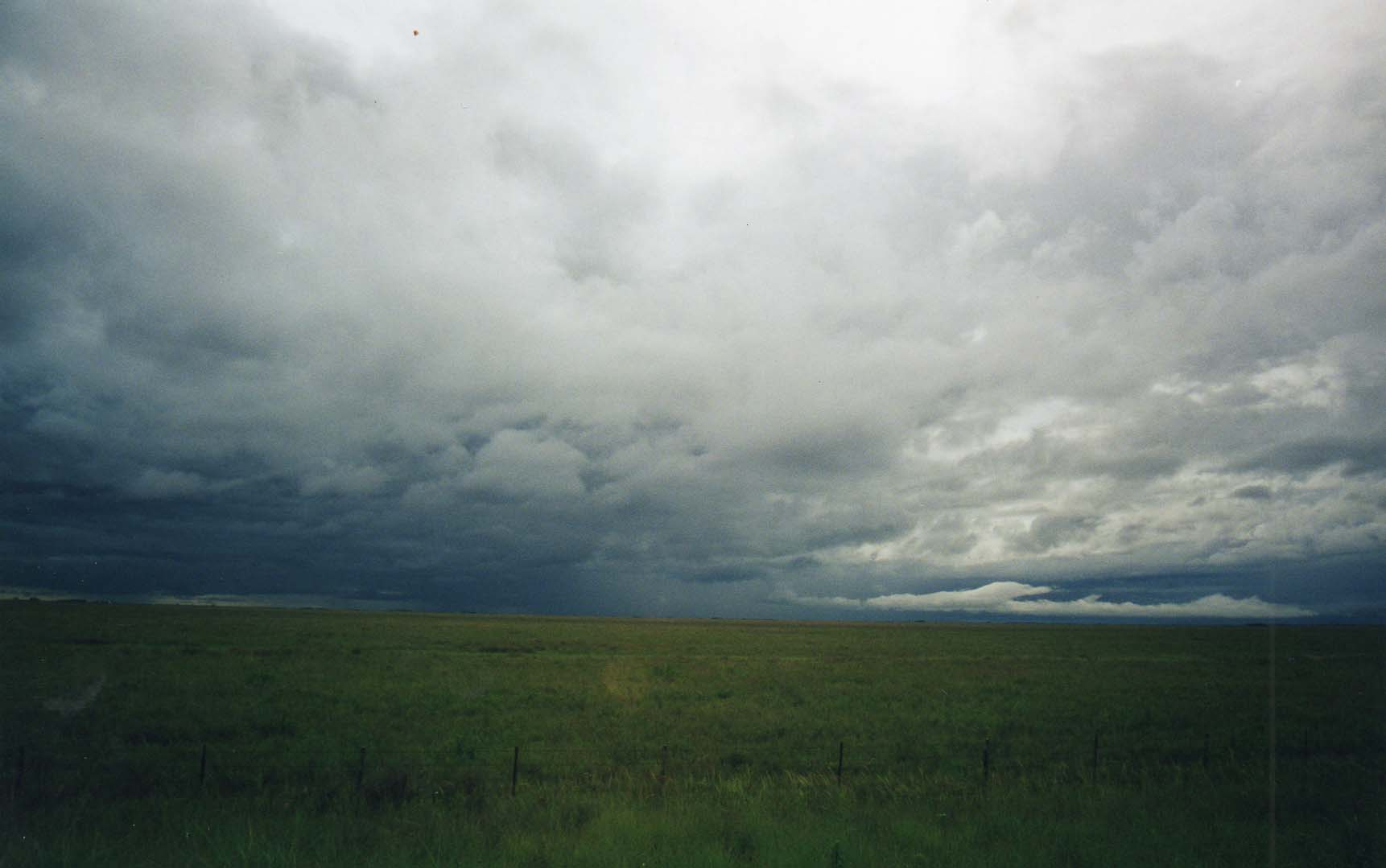
Thunderstorm tracks

== Cities ==
=== Colombia ===
- Acacías
- Arauca, Arauca
- Gaviotas
- Maní, Casanare
- Orocué
- Paz de Ariporo
- Puerto Carreño
- Inírida
- Puerto López, Meta
- San José del Guaviare
- Saravena
- Tame
- Villavicencio
- Yopal
- Fortul

=== Venezuela ===
- Acarigua
- Araure
- Barinas
- Calabozo
- Caripito
- El Tigre
- Guanare
- Maturín
- Puerto Ayacucho
- Sabaneta
- San Carlos
- San Fernando de Apure
- Tucupita
- Valle de la Pascua

== See also ==
- History of Colombia
- History of Venezuela
