= Turuépano National Park =

National park in Venezuela

Turuépano National Park Parque nacional Turuépano
- IUCN category II (national park)
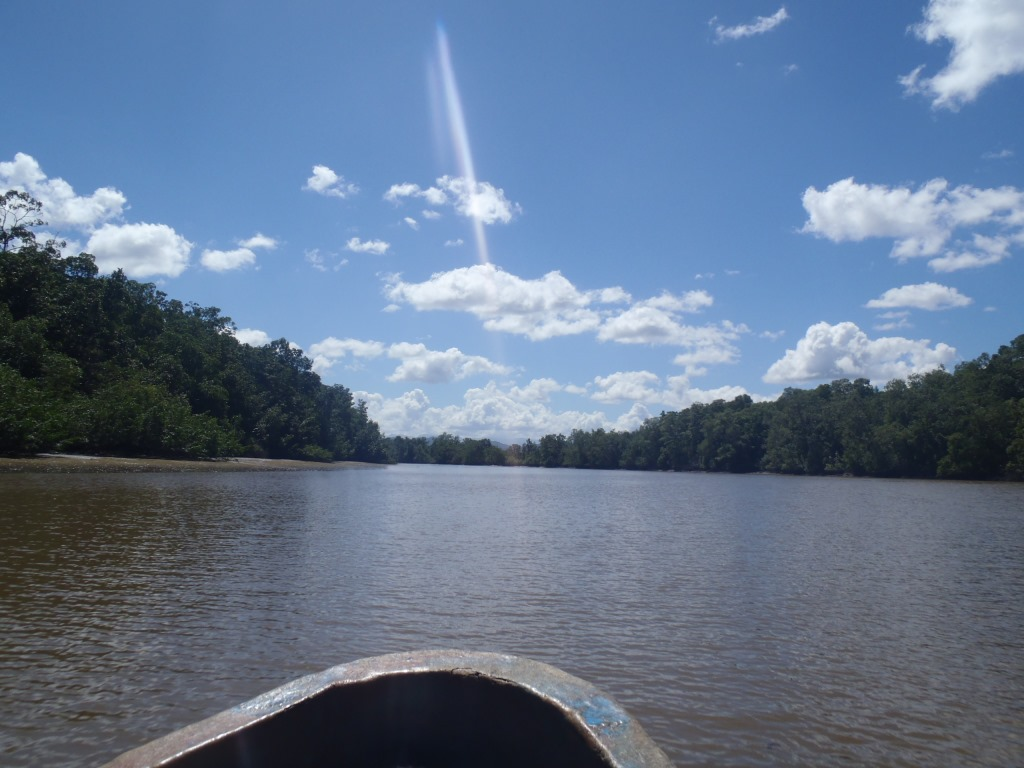

- Location within Venezuela
- Location: Venezuela
- Coordinates: 10°47′N 63°30′W
- Area: 726 km^{2} (280 sq mi)
- Established: June 5, 1991

The Turuépano National Park (Spanish: Parque nacional Turuépano) Is a protected area with national park status in the South American country of Venezuela, located in the Benítez, Cajigal, Libertador and Mariño municipalities in the eastern part of Sucre State, north of the San Juan River and in front of the Gulf of Paria.

The park protects part of the Orinoco Delta swamp forests ecoregion. The park is composed of deltaic plains with marine influence, unique in the country, characterized by mangrove swamps, canals and channels, being the main inhabitant of these places the manatee. It has an estimated area of 72,600 hectares.

The temperature remains constant throughout the year with an annual variation of 2 °C and the averages oscillate between 26.9 °C and 27.8 °C. The Caño Viejo and Blanca Lagoon are recognized corners of the National Park where many birds live and pass. It was created by Decree N ° 1.634 dated 05/06/1991; Published in Official Gazette 34.987 dated 06/17/1992.

== See also ==
- List of national parks of Venezuela
- Canaima National Park

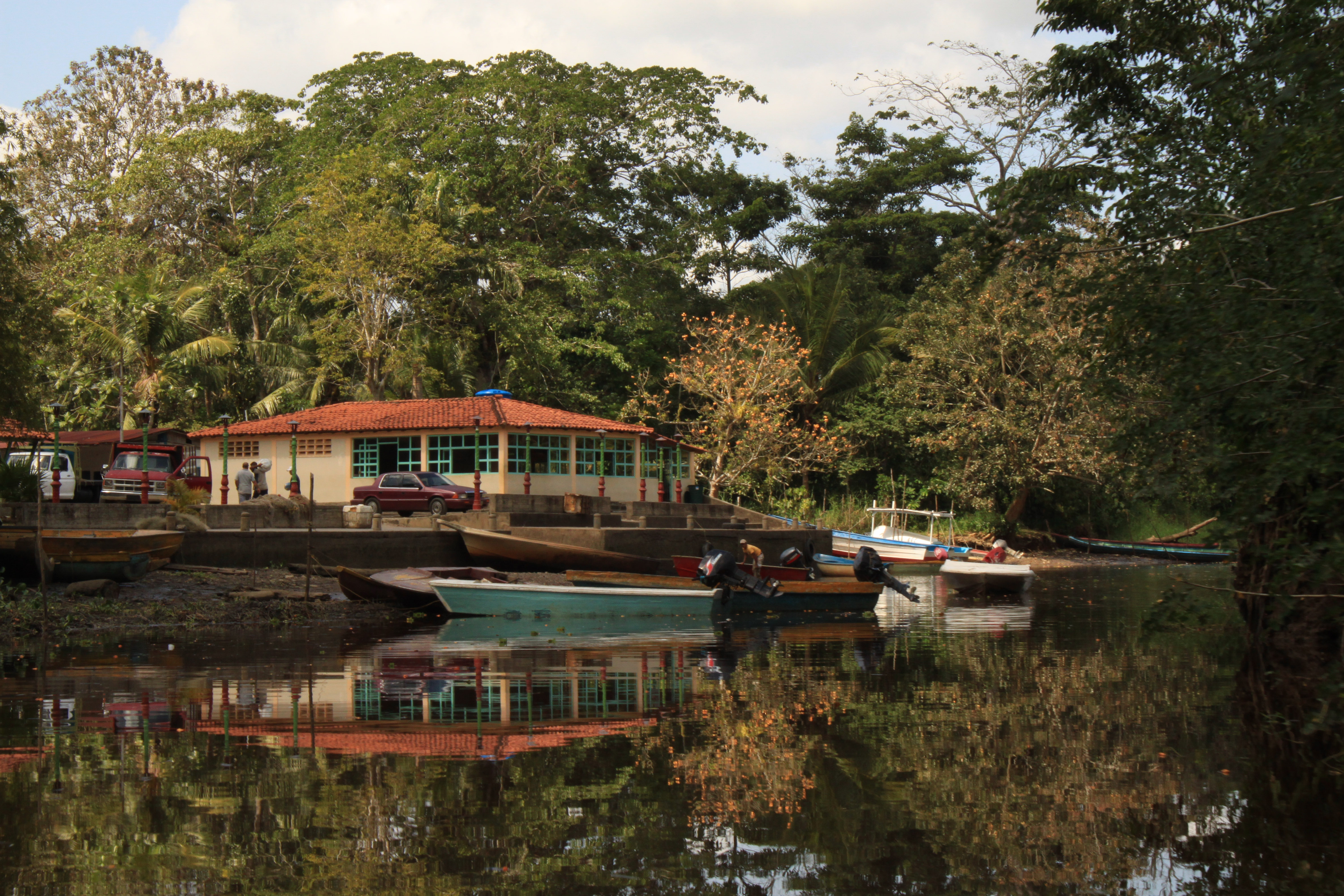
Another View
