= Caño Manamo =

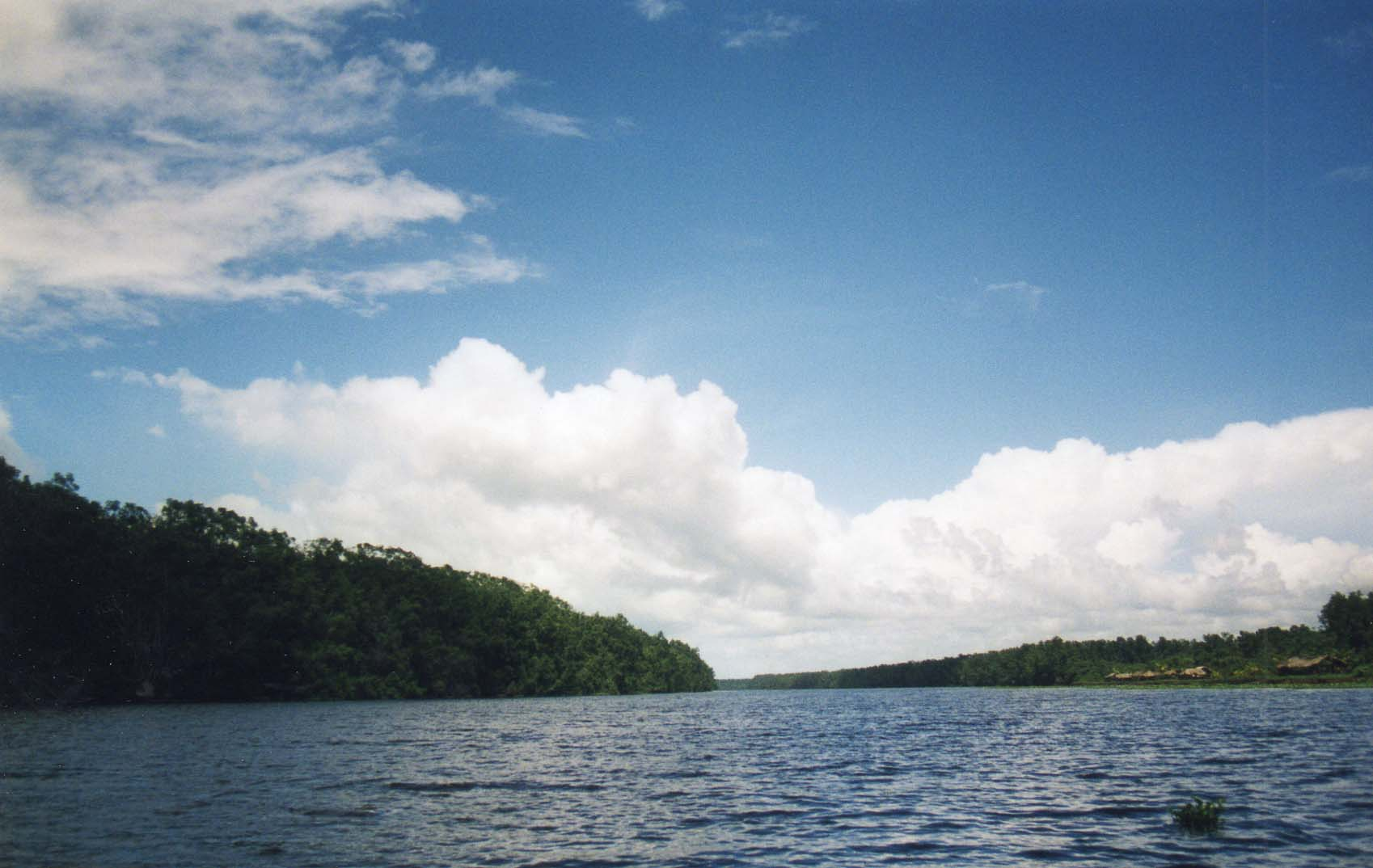

- Mouth location in Venezuela

Location
- Country: Venezuela

Physical characteristics
- Mouth
  - location: Gulf of Paria
  - coordinates: 9°53′56″N 62°22′02″W

The Caño Manamo is a distributary of the Orinoco River. It branches northwards from the main channel of the Orinoco to delimit the western edge of the Orinoco Delta, ultimately emptying into the Gulf of Paria. Tucupita, the capital of Delta Amacuro state, is located on the east bank (right) of the Caño Manamo. Manamo is a Warao word meaning "two."

A flood control program in the 1960s dammed the Caño Manamo and thus reduced water levels in the upper delta. This part of the delta became tidal and much more saline than before, with a drastic impact on the flora and fauna of the Orinoco Delta swamp forests.
