= Orinoco Delta =

Delta region of the Orinoco River

- Delta del Orinoco
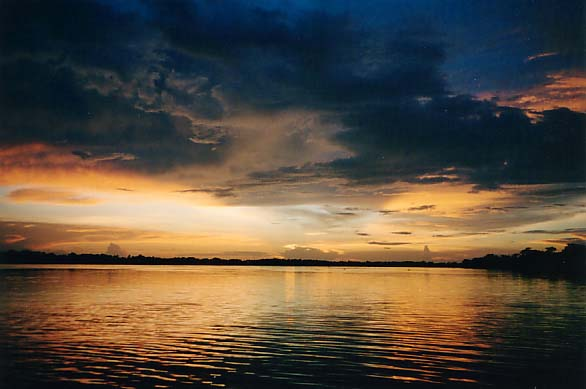
- Orinoco Delta's sunset

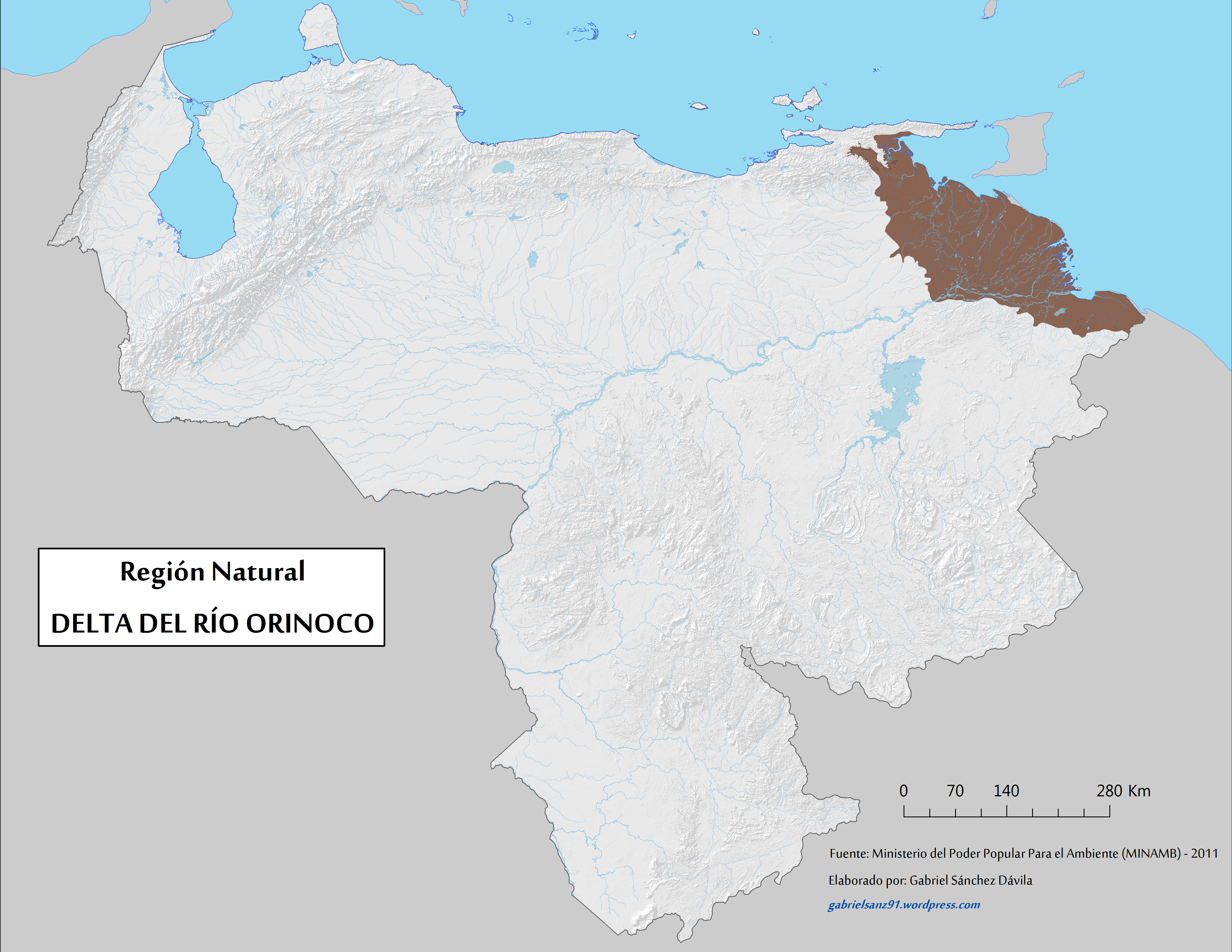
- Geographic map of the Orinoco Delta natural region.
- Location: Delta Amacuro, Monagas & Sucre, Venezuela
- Coordinates: 9°N 61°W
- Part of: Orinoco Basin
- Surface area: 43,646 km^{2} (16,852 sq mi)

The Orinoco Delta is a vast river delta of the Orinoco River, located in eastern Venezuela.

== Location ==
The Orinoco Delta is one of the eight natural regions of Venezuela. It covers the whole of Delta Amacuro State and a few square kilometers of Monagas State and Sucre State, comprising all the mouths of the Orinoco. It is divided into two sections: the principal, at the northernmost part of the system, located between Caño Manamo and the left shore of Caño Araguao, where the majority of villages are established, including the state capital Tucupita; and the secondary, between the right shore of Caño Araguao and Río Grande. The Warao people live in the region.

== Hydrology ==
The delta is fan-shaped, formed by the Orinoco River as it splits into numerous distributaries, called caños, which meander through the delta on their way to the sea. The main distributary is called the Rio Grande, which empties south-southeast through the southern portion of the delta, and the second major distributary is Caño Manamo, which runs northward along the western edge of the delta. The area of this region is approximately 43,646 square kilometres (16,852 sq mi). The Orinoco Delta is characterized by being non-centric, lagoon lacking, and oceanic, somewhat similar to the delta of the Niger River.

Daily tides allude to seawater the "caños", causing the "macareo" or pororoca and reversing the flow direction of water, at least on the surface.

== Environment ==
The predominant vegetation is in the Orinoco Delta swamp forests ecoregion.

Along the coast and the river margins there are stretches of Amazon–Orinoco–Southern Caribbean mangroves, specifically the Guianan mangroves ecoregion.

To the west, and closer to the coast, there are patches of the Orinoco wetlands ecoregion.

The delta includes large areas of permanent wetlands as well as seasonally-flooded freshwater swamp forests. The river margins of the delta are fringed with mangroves.

== Sources ==
- "Amazon-Orinoco-Southern Caribbean mangroves", Global Species, Myers Enterprises II, archived from the original on 2022-01-16
- Schipper, Jan, Northern South America: Northeastern Venezuela and northwestern Guyana (NT0147)
- Tognetti, Sylvia; Burdette, Christine; Schipper, Jan, Eastern South America: Coastal French Guiana, Suriname, Guyana, and southeastern Venezuela (NT1411)
- WildFinder, WWF: World Wildlife Fund
