= Amapá mangroves =

Ecoregion in Amapá, Brazil

Amapá mangroves (NT1402)
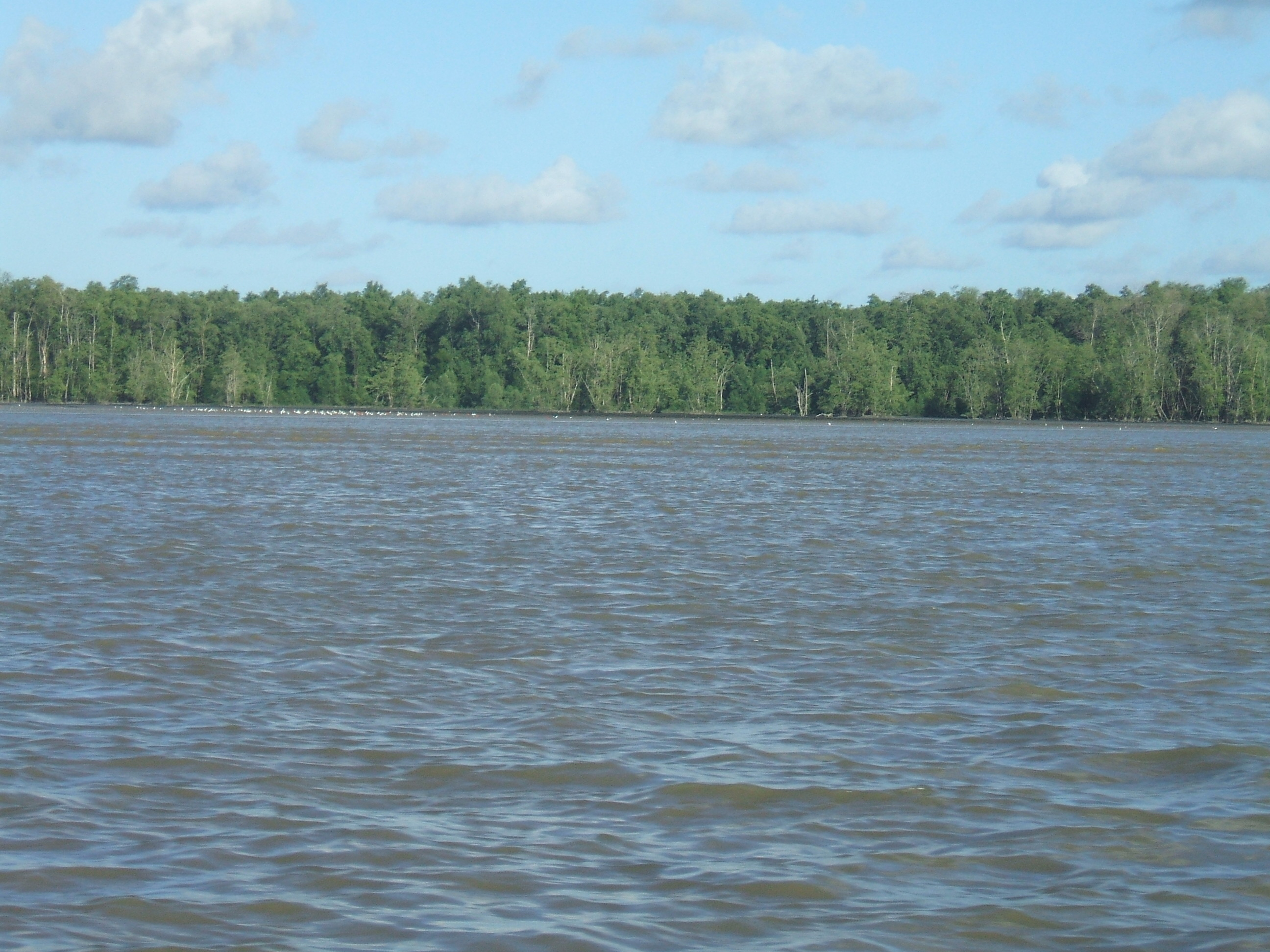
- Avicennia schaueriana in the Cabo Orange National Park

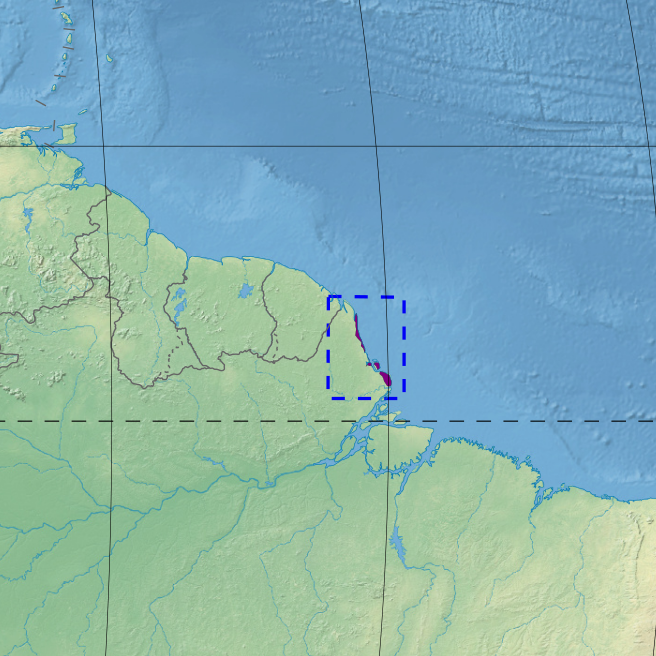
- Ecoregion territory (in purple)

Ecology
- Realm: Neotropical
- Biome: Mangrove
- Borders: Guianan savanna; Marajó várzea

Geography
- Area: 1,550 km^{2} (600 sq mi)
- Country: Brazil
- Coordinates: 3.096°N 51.028°W
- Climate type: Af: equatorial, fully humid

The Amapá mangroves (NT1402) is an ecoregion along the Atlantic coast of the state of Amapá in Brazil. The low coastal plain has been formed from recent sedimentation, including sediments deposited by the rivers and sediments carried northward from the mouth of the Amazon River by strong currents and deposited by the tides. The extensive mangroves grow on the newly formed coastal mudflats and along the edges of estuaries. They merge into freshwater várzea flooded forests further inland. The ecoregion is generally well-preserved, although excessive extraction of natural resources including timber and shrimps is a concern.

== Location ==
Location in Brazil

The Amapá mangroves cover an area of 1,550 square kilometres (600 sq mi). They run along the Atlantic coast to the north of the mouth of the Amazon River up to the mouth of the Cassiporé River. The ecoregion is naturally fragmented, with patches of mangroves developing where the conditions are suitable for their growth. The mangroves form the coastal margin of the Marajó várzea ecoregion. They are part of the larger Guianan-Amazon Mangroves global ecoregion, which also includes the Maranhão mangroves, Pará mangroves and Guianan mangroves.

== Physical ==
The flat coastal plain of Amapá is made up of Holocene epoch deposits, and is flooded by freshwater rivers and by the tides. Tidal range is about 5.2 metres (17 ft), and tidal influence extends far into the interior. Strong ocean currents run along the coast. The currents carry fresh water and sediments from the Amazon basin northward, depositing the sediments to form unstable islands and mudflats of fine-grained clay that are colonized as they form by the mangroves. A complex network of natural canals runs through the mangroves. The low terrain and high tides let the mangroves reach to 40 kilometres (25 mi) inland.

The ecoregion has a humid tropical climate. Mean temperatures are from 25 to 26 °C (77 to 79 °F). Annual rainfall is up to 4,000 millimetres (160 in), with a dry season that lasts only two months.

== Ecology ==
The ecoregion is in the Neotropical realm and the mangrove biome.

=== Origins ===
A study of sediment cores from the coastal plain near Calçoene gives information on the way in which the mangrove and várzea flooded forest have evolved during the late Holocene epoch. Sediment from 2100 years before the present shows no sign of mangroves. This was followed by a phase where mud filled depressions and tidal channels. Mangroves developed on the edge of the channels and herbaceous field on the higher land. In the next phase mangrove development halted and várzea vegetation expanded, indicating more freshwater and less sea water in the area. In the last and present phase both the várzea and the mangroves have been increasing in area, probably due to a rise in the sea level relative to the land.

=== Flora ===
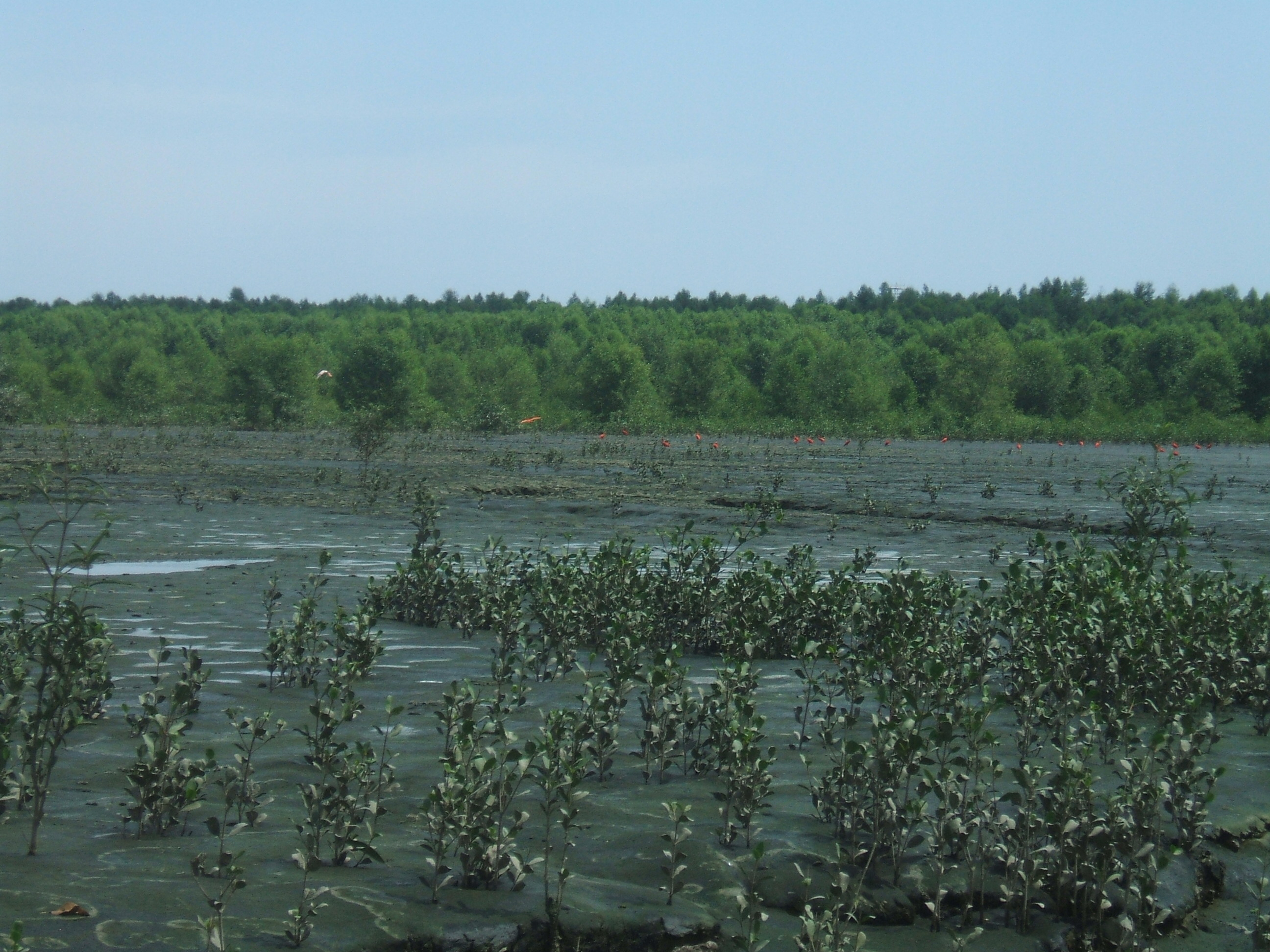
Mangrove swamp (Avicennia schaueriana) in formation

The ecoregion holds about 13% of Brazilian mangrove formations. The mangroves along the Amapá coastal plain form zones parallel to the shoreline where different species of mangroves have responded differently to frequency of flooding, waterlogging, availability of nutrients, soil salinity and volume of freshwater from the rivers, the last depending on rainfall. The dense mangrove forests mainly consist of Avicennia, Rhizophora and Laguncularia species. They extend from the mean tidal level to the high spring tide. The mangroves extend inland along estuaries for up to 20 kilometres (12 mi).

On the recently formed coastal land the mangroves are mainly in the Avicennia family, with canopies of 15 to 20 metres (49 to 66 ft) in height. Avicennia germinans and Avicennia schaueriana are common, with the latter growing up to 45 metres (148 ft) high. Away from the coast the Rhizophora mangle is more common, often lying behind a fringe of Laguncularia racemosa or sometimes the lily Montrichardia arborescens. Other mangroves found further inland are Rhizophora racemosa, Rhizophora harrisonii, Laguncularia racemosa and Conocarpus erectus.

Non-tree species that grow among the mangroves are Spartina alterniflora on the margin facing the sea, and Hibiscus tiliaceus and Acrostichum aureum on inland margins and dry parches within the mangroves. The heavy rainfall and freshwater from the many rivers from the interior create low salinity so that palms such as açaí (Euterpe oleracea) and Attalea speciosa and freshwater macrophytes such as Montrichardia arborescens and Mora oleifera can grow among the mangroves. Other tropical forest species found among the mangroves include Dalbergia brownei and Rhabdadenia biflora.

=== Fauna ===
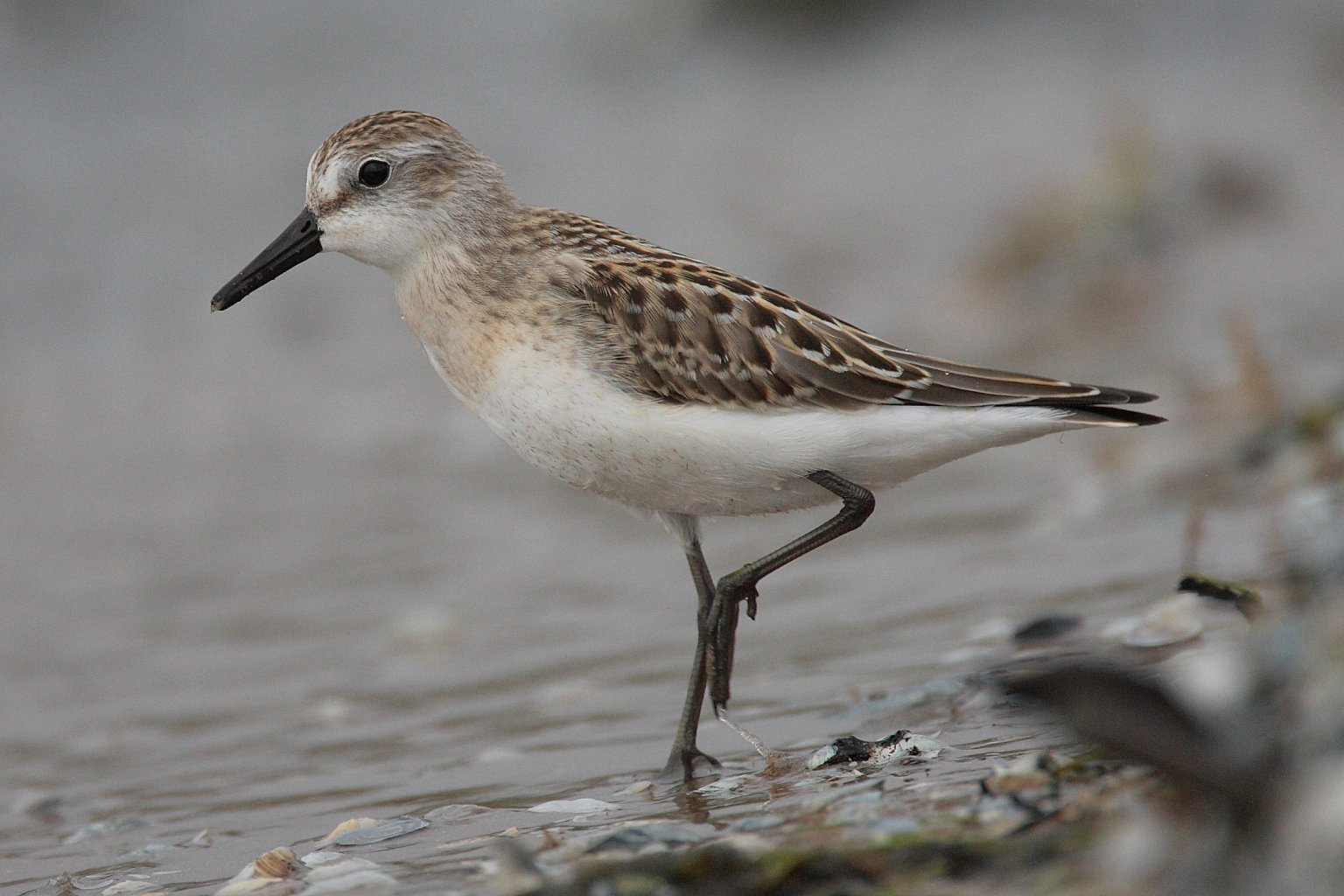
The near-threatened wader semipalmated sandpiper (Calidris pusilla)

Mammals including howler monkeys (Alouatta genus), black bearded saki (Chiropotes satanas), tufted capuchin (Sapajus apella), crab-eating fox (Cerdocyon thous), tayra (Eira barbara), jaguarundi (Puma yagouaroundi), ocelot (Leopardus pardalis), margay (Leopardus wiedii), jaguar (Panthera onca), cougar (Puma concolor), lowland paca (Cuniculus paca), capybara (Hydrochoerus hydrochaeris), South American tapir (Tapirus terrestris), South American coati (Nasua nasua), crab-eating raccoon (Procyon cancrivorus), neotropical otter (Lontra longicaudis), giant otter (Pteronura brasiliensis), tucuxi (Sotalia fluviatilis) and West Indian manatee (Trichechus manatus). The green sea turtle (Chelonia mydas) and leatherback sea turtle (Dermochelys coriacea) also use the mangroves.

Birds adapted to the mangrove environment include orange-winged amazon (Amazona amazonica), cocoi heron (Ardea cocoi), rufous crab hawk (Buteogallus aequinoctialis), striated heron (Butorides striata), semipalmated sandpiper (Calidris pusilla), great egret (Ardea alba), green kingfisher (Chloroceryle americana), bicolored conebill (Conirostrum bicolor), greater ani (Crotophaga major), little blue heron (Egretta caerulea), scarlet ibis (Eudocimus ruber) and wattled jacana (Jacana jacana).

== Status ==
The mangroves are the best-preserved in the Americas. The World Wildlife Fund gives the ecoregion the status "Relatively Stable/Intact". It is relatively inaccessible and has few people. The mangroves provide a source of crabs and seafood to the local artisanal fishermen, who use the mangrove wood for fuel and for building boats and dwellings, and use the bark to make tannin for dying the sails of their boats. The main threat is unsustainable exploitation, particularly commercial extraction of wood and other forest products, sea food and minerals, and conversion of the land into pasturage. Offshore oil extraction also poses a threat, since an oil spill could have a devastating effect on the mangroves and thus on fish stocks.

The ecoregion is protected by several conservation units including the Cabo Orange National Park. The Maracá-Jipioca Ecological Station protects the 602 square kilometres (232 sq mi) Ilhas de Maracá, two islands about 5 kilometres (3.1 mi) offshore in Amapá municipality. The shoreline and stream banks are dominated by mangroves, with typical floodplain species of trees in the more elevated areas. The conservation units are part of the Amapá Biodiversity Corridor, which contains the largest stretch of protected mangroves in the Americas.

== Sources ==
- Guianan-Amazon Mangroves, WWF Global, archived from the original on 2017-04-05
- Guimarães, José T.F.; Cohen, Marcelo C.L.; França, Marlon C.; Lara, Rúben J.; Behling, Hermann (June 2010), "Model of wetland development of the Amapá coast during the late Holocene" (PDF), Anais da Academia Brasileira de Ciências, 82 (2), Rio de Janeiro: 451–465, doi:10.1590/S0001-37652010000200021, ISSN 0001-3765
- Silva, José Maria Cardoso da; Rio do Valle, Milena del; Santos, Isabela (2007), Amapá Biodiversity Corridor (PDF), Belém: CI Brazil
- Spalding, Mark; Kainuma, Mami; Collins, Lorna (2010), World Atlas of Mangroves, Earthscan, ISBN 978-1-84977-660-8
- Tognetti, Sylvia S.; Burdette, Christine, Northern South America: Northern Brazil (NT1402), WWF: World Wildlife Fund
- Unidade de Conservação: Estação ecológica de Maracá-Jipioca (in Portuguese), MMA: Ministério do Meio Ambiente
- Vidal, John (16 February 2017), "Brazil's forgotten state: oil and agribusiness threaten Amapá forests – in pictures", The Guardian, Amapá state
- WildFinder, WWF: World Wildlife Fund
