= Maranhão mangroves =

Mangrove ecoregion of northern Brazil

Maranhão mangroves (NT1419)
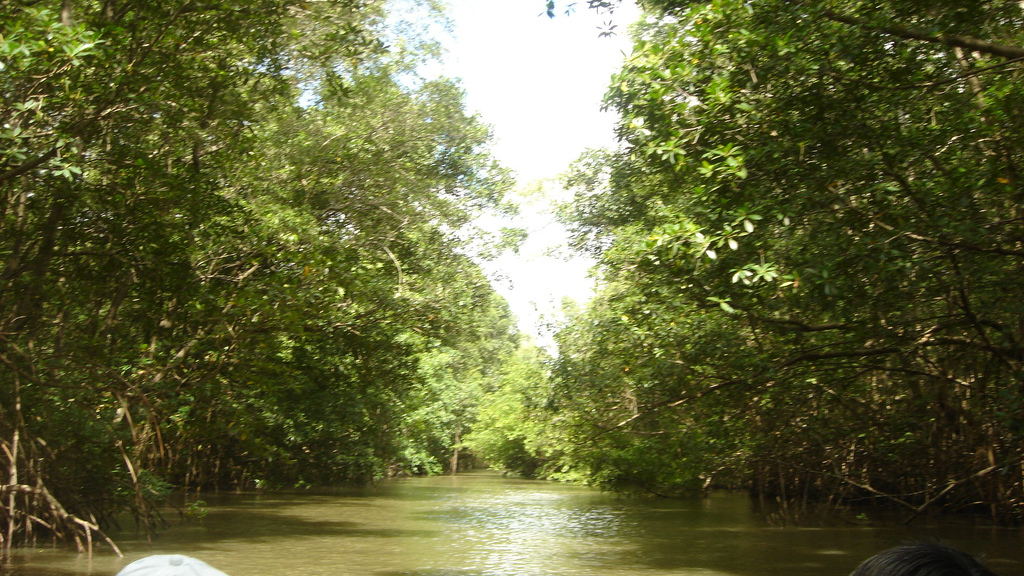
- Igarapé (shallow channel) in Maranhão

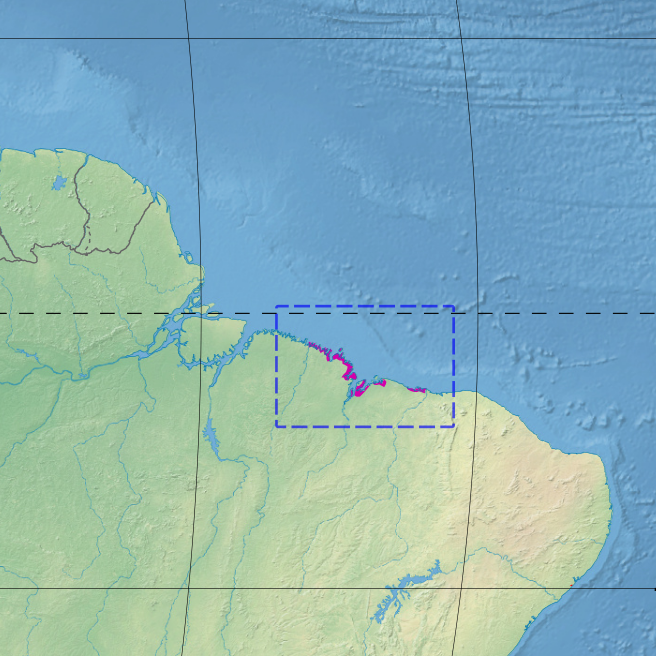
- Ecoregion territory (purple, in blue dashed box)

Ecology
- Realm: Neotropical
- Biome: Mangrove

Geography
- Area: 11,300 km^{2} (4,400 sq mi)
- Country: Brazil
- Coordinates: 1.625°S 44.752°W
- Climate type: Af: equatorial, fully humid

The Maranhão mangroves (in Portuguese: Reentrâncias Maranhenses) is a mangrove ecoregion of northern Brazil. It supports half of the shorebird population of the country. The combination of flat land, heavy rainfall and high tides causes the mangroves to extend up to 40 kilometres (25 mi) inland, where they are interspersed with other rainforest species.

== Location ==
The ecoregion covers and area of 11,300 square kilometers (4,400 sq mi) on the Atlantic coast of Maranhão state. The ecoregion is part of the 31,855 square kilometres (12,299 sq mi) Guianan-Amazon Mangroves global ecoregion, which also contains the Guianan mangroves, Amapá mangroves and Pará mangroves ecoregions. The land is flat and tides may be as high as 8 metres (26 ft) in same places, so salt water may reach inland along the many estuaries and rivers for as far as 40 kilometres (25 mi).

The ecoregion may be divided into eastern and western parts. The western part extends from the Pará boundary along the coast of western Maranhão state to the Baía de São Marcos. Here the coastline is made up of hundreds of islands and mudflats, made up of fine silt deposited by the Amazon River. The eastern part extends from the Baía de São Marcos along the eastern coast of Maranhão to the mouth of the Parnaíba River. Here the coast is dominated by extensive sand dunes, interspersed with pockets of mangroves in bays and river mouths.

== Climate ==
The ecoregion has a hot and humid.climate. Mean annual temperature is 26 °C (79 °F). Annual rainfall averages 2,500 millimetres (98 in) and may be as high as 4,000 millimetres (160 in).

== Flora ==
The ecoregion holds about 36% of all mangroves in Brazil. In the western part the mangroves cover the mudflats and islands along the coast and extend inland as far as 40 kilometres (25 mi) along the many rivers, bays and estuaries. The heavy rainfall and inputs from many rivers in the region reduce salinity, so that palms (family Arecaceae) and freshwater macrophytes often grow with the mangroves. Towards the east of the ecoregion there are longer dry seasons and higher salinity, so the mangroves are less developed.

The most common mangrove species is Rhizophora mangle, which is found nearest to the coast and grows to as high as 25 metres (82 ft). Other mangrove species are Avicennia germinans, Avicennia schaueriana, Rhizophora racemosa, Rhizophora harrisonii, Laguncularia racemosa and Conocarpus erectus. Flora that grow on the margins of the mangroves include Spartina alterniflora on the seaward side and Hibiscus tiliaceus and Acrostichum aureum on the landward side and dry patches within the mangroves. Flora that grow with the mangroves due to the low salinity include Dalbergia brownei, Rhabdadenia biflora, Montrichardia arborescens, Mora oleifera, açaí palm (Euterpe oleracea) and Attalea speciosa.

== Fauna ==
The Maranhão mangroves are home to half the total population of shorebirds in Brazil, and 7% of all shorebirds in South America. They are also important areas for feeding and breeding for herons (family Ardeidae) and roseate spoonbills (Platalea ajaja). Rare and endangered species include scarlet ibis (Eudocimus ruber), wattled jacana (Jacana jacana), tucuxi (Sotalia fluviatilis), West Indian manatee (Trichechus manatus) and several species of sea turtle that use the mangroves as a breeding area.

== Status ==
The World Wildlife Fund gives the ecoregion the status of "Vulnerable". It is inaccessible and has a low human population, so is mostly intact. The mangroves are used by many artisanal fishermen for subsistence crab collection. The mangrove wood is used for fuel, housing and boats, and tannin from the bark is used as a dye. In some areas mangroves have been replaced by rice fields or used for urban development. Commercial over-fishing, industrial waste and pollution from gold mining are concerns.

Protected areas include the Bacanga State Park and the Lençóis Maranhenses National Park, a Ramsar Convention wetland of international importance and a Western Hemisphere Shorebird Reserve Network site.

== Sources ==
- Guianan-Amazon Mangroves, WWF Global
- Tognetti, Sylvia S.; Burdette, Christine, Northeastern Brazil (NT1419), WWF: World Wildlife Fund
