= Pará mangroves =

Mangrove ecoregion in Northern Brazil

Pará mangroves (NT1427)
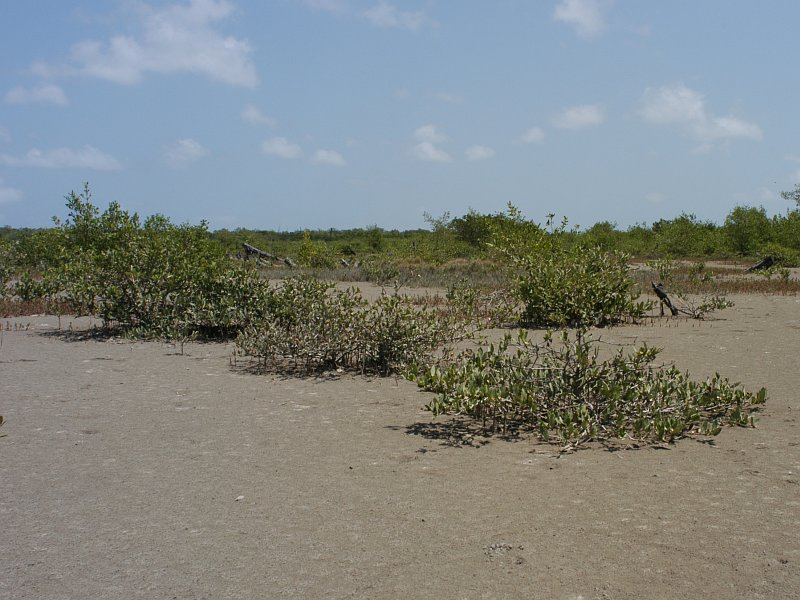
- Shrub mangroves (Avicennia germinans) on a hypersaline, rarely inundated salt flat near Bragança

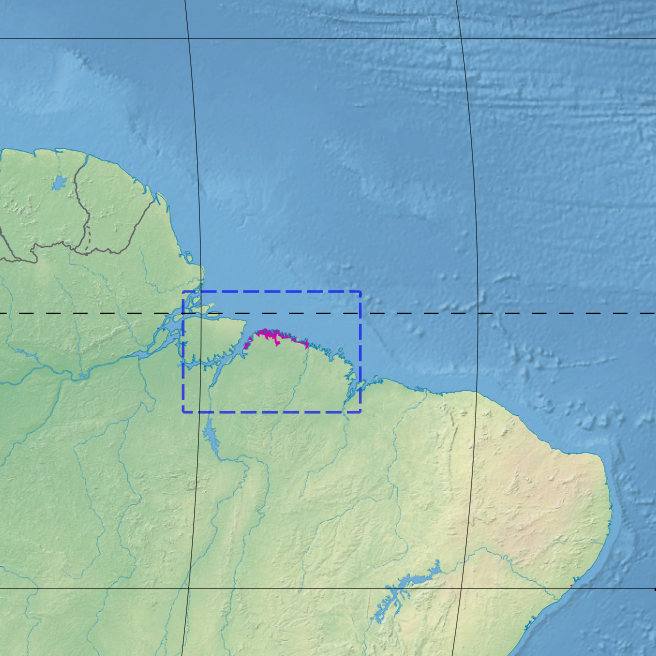
- Ecoregion territory (in purple, in blue dashed box)

Ecology
- Realm: Neotropical
- Biome: Mangrove

Geography
- Countries: Brazil
- Coordinates: 0.807°S 46.853°W
- Climate type: Af: equatorial, fully humid

The Pará mangroves (NT1427) is an ecoregion along the Atlantic coast of the state of Pará in Brazil. They constitute the western extension of the Maranhão mangroves ecoregion. The mangroves are relatively intact, although they are under some pressure from agriculture and logging.

== Location ==
The Pará mangroves grow along the coast of the state of Pará, and extend inland along estuaries and rivers for up to 45 kilometres (28 mi). They include a stretch of the Atlantic coast of Marajó island, and the Marajó Bay and Atlantic coasts of mainland Pará. They adjoin the western part of the Maranhão mangroves ecoregion, stretching from near Belém on the Pará River along the coast of eastern Pará state to the border of Maranhão state. (Note: There is some confusion in the World Wildlife Fund (WWF) definitions as of April 2017. The World Wildlife Finder shows the mangroves along the northeast coast of Brazil as all being in the Amazon–Orinoco–Southern Caribbean mangroves ecoregion. The WWF's definition of the Pará mangroves says they extend north from the Baía de Marajó to Cabo Caciporé, including the Cape Orange National Park. This section of coast is in the state of Amapá, not Pará, and corresponds to the definition of the Amapá mangroves. This article assumes the Pará mangroves are the westward continuation of the Maranhão mangroves.) The mangroves adjoin the Tocantins–Araguaia–Maranhão moist forests further inland and the Marajó várzea at the mouth of the Amazon River. The ecoregion contains about 28% of the total mangrove area in Brazil. They are part of the larger Amazon–Orinoco–Southern Caribbean mangroves global ecoregion, which also includes the Maranhão mangroves, Amapá mangroves and Guianan mangroves.

== Physical ==
The terrain consists of islands and mudflats created from fine-grained sediments and clay deposited by the Amazon, which are colonized as they form and stabilized by the salt-tolerant mangroves. The tides range from 5 to 7 metres (16 to 23 ft). Since the land is flat, saline water and mangroves are found as much as 45 kilometres (28 mi) from the coast.

The climate is tropical, warm and humid. Temperatures range from 24 to 32 °C (75 to 90 °F). Mean air temperature is about 26 °C (79 °F). Mean annual rainfall is about 2,300 millimetres (91 in), with a well-defined dry season from July to December when monthly rainfall is under 50 millimetres (2.0 in). Annual rainfall may be as high as 4,000 millimetres (160 in).

== Ecology ==
The ecoregion is in the Neotropical realm and the mangrove biome. Mangroves form a continuous belt along the Pará and Maranhão coasts, with six species of mangrove trees and several associated species. They are important as a nursery for fish and in protecting the coast, and provide an important source of food and other resources to the local human population. The mangroves of Pará and Maranhão extend along 650 kilometres (400 mi) of coast and cover about 700,000 hectares (1,700,000 acres) or about 85% of mangroves in Brazil. The mangroves benefit from the constant influx of fresh water from rainfall and from the Amazon River. However, they must compete with freshwater hardwood species typical of the Amazon rainforest.

=== Flora ===
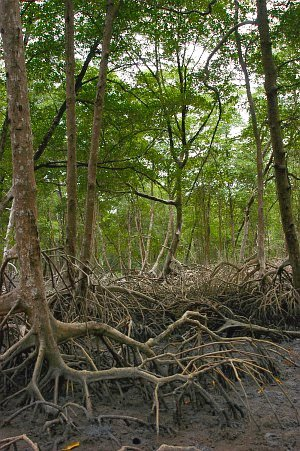
Rhizophora mangle (red mangrove) forest, Caeté estuary, Bragança, Pará

The most common mangrove tree species in Rhizophora mangle, which dominates estuaries that are most exposed to the ocean. Rhizophora mangle reaches 25 metres (82 ft) in height. Rhizophora racemosa is less common, found only in Pará only in Marajó Bay, as is Rhizophora harrisonii, intermediate in salt tolerance between these two. Avicennia germinans is common on higher areas with less flooding, and under more saline conditions. Avicennia schaueriana is less common, mainly found near sandy beaches. Avicennia schaueriana may reach 45 metres (148 ft) in height. Laguncularia racemosa is found along the coast in saline and brackish environments, mostly along forest edges and other open spaces.

The transition zone between the coastal mangroves and inland dry forest holds Rhizophora racemosa, Rhizophora harrisonii, Laguncularia racemosa and Conocarpus erectus mangroves, as well as Spartina alterniflora on the seaward margin and Hibiscus tiliaceus and Acrostichum aureum on the landward margins. Tropical forest and palm species that grow with the mangroves include Dalbergia brownei, Rhabdadenia biflora, Montrichardia arborescens, Mora oleifera, açaí palm (Euterpe oleracea) and Orbygnia martiana.

=== Fauna ===
Rare and endangered fauna include scarlet ibis (Eudocimus ruber), wattled jacana (Jacana jacana), tucuxi (Sotalia fluviatilis), West Indian manatee (Trichechus manatus), green sea turtle (Chelonia mydas) and leatherback sea turtle (Dermochelys coriacea).

== Status ==
The World Wildlife Fund gives the ecoregion the status of "Relatively Stable/Intact". The mangroves are inaccessible, and population density is low, so much of the habitat is intact other than the city of Belém and its surroundings. The mangroves are used by artisanal fishermen as a source of crabs and wood. Threats include subsistence agriculture and livestock raising, tourism, logging, mining and urban development.

== Sources ==
- Guianan-Amazon Mangroves, WWF Global, archived from the original on 2017-04-05
- Menezes, Moirah Paula Machado de; Berger, Uta; Mehlig, Ulf. (2008), "Mangrove vegetation in Amazonia: a review of studies from the coast of Pará and Maranhão States, north Brazil" (PDF), Acta Amazonica, 38 (3): 403–420, doi:10.1590/S0044-59672008000300004
- Tognetti, Sylvia S.; Burdette, Christine, Northeastern Brazil (NT1427), WWF: World Wildlife Fund
- Tognetti, Sylvia S.; Burdette, Christine; (c), Northern South America: Northern Brazil (NT1402), WWF: World Wildlife Fund
- WildFinder, WWF: World Wildlife Fund
