= Guianan mangroves =

Coastal ecoregion of southeastern Venezuela, Guyana, Suriname and French Guiana

Guianan mangroves (NT1411)
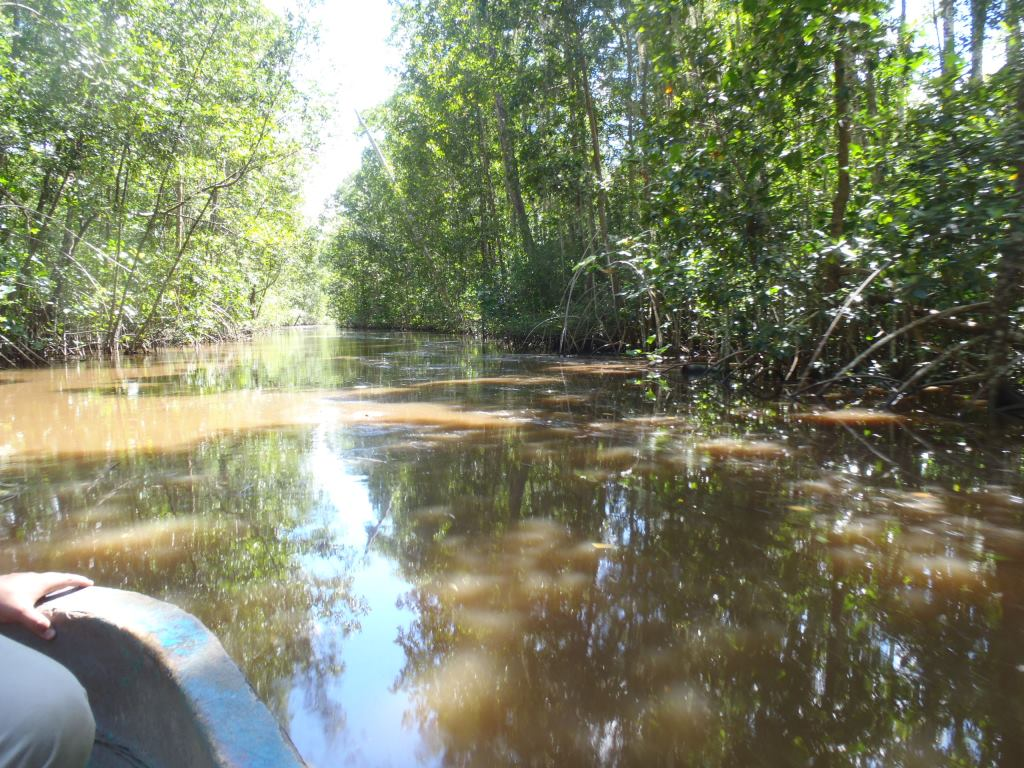
- Turuépano National Park

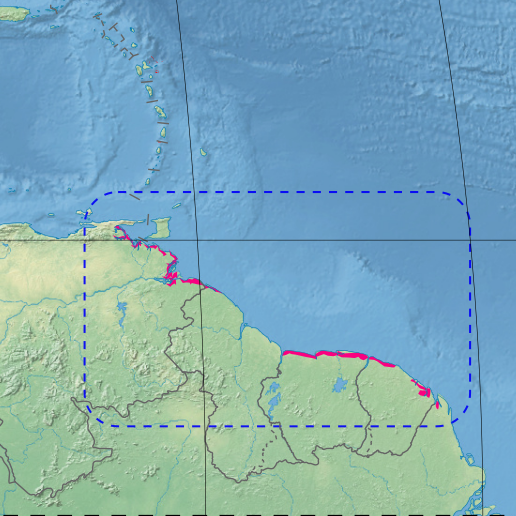
- Ecoregion territory (in red)

Ecology
- Realm: Neotropical
- Biome: Mangrove

Geography
- Area: 14,500 km^{2} (5,600 sq mi)
- Countries: French Guiana, Suriname, Guyana, Venezuela, Brazil
- Coordinates: 5.982°N 55.637°W
- Climate type: Af: equatorial, fully humid

The Guianan mangroves (NT1411) is a coastal ecoregion of southeastern Venezuela, Guyana, Suriname, French Guiana and Brazil. The mangroves provide an important habitat for migrating birds that winter in the area. Large areas are intact, although they are threatened by destruction of the trees for timber and to make way for agriculture, and from upstream agricultural and industrial pollution.

== Location ==
The Guianan mangroves ecoregion extends along the Atlantic coasts of northeastern Venezuela, Guyana, Suriname, French Guiana, and Cabo Orange in Brazil. It covers an area of about 14,500 square kilometres (5,600 sq mi) between the deltas of the Orinoco and Oyapock rivers. It includes the Gulf of Paria and the delta of the San Juan River. The largest part is in Venezuela in and around the Orinoco delta.

The mangroves lie between the sea and areas of Orinoco Delta swamp forests, Guianan moist forests and Guianan freshwater swamp forests. The Guianan mangroves ecoregion is part of the 31,855 square kilometres (12,299 sq mi) Guianan-Amazon Mangroves global ecoregion, which also contains the Amapa mangroves, Pará mangroves and Maranhão mangroves ecoregions.

== Physical ==
Elevations in the flat, narrow strip of coastal land covered by the mangroves range from sea level to about 4 metres (13 ft) above sea level. Sand and shell ridges and elevated mud flats are formed by accumulated sediments, carried steadily westward from the mouth of the Amazon by strong ocean currents. The mud flats evolve into clay flats occupied by some species of mangrove. The coastlines suffer periodically from extensive erosion after large number of mangroves die at the same time. Other habitats are brackish or salt lagoons, brackish herbaceous swamps, swamp woods and swamp forests. The swamps are a source of fresh water to the mangroves.

The alluvial plains in the northwest have different characteristics. The San Juan delta has swamps with marine-fluvial sediment deposits, the Gulf of Paria has marine sediments and the Orinoco delta has mainly fluvial sediments. The tides are no more than 1.3 metres (4 ft 3 in) in the Orinoco delta. The Oronoco river has an average flow of 36,000 cubic metres (1,300,000 cu ft) per second, and deposits 200,000 tons of sediment each year, resulting in a very unstable landscape.

== Climate ==
There are considerable differences in climate along the length of the ecoregion. Annual rainfall varies from 960 millimetres (38 in) in Venezuela to the east of the Gulf of Paria to 3,054 millimetres (120.2 in) in parts of Suriname. Some areas have a four-month dry season while others have none. In the Orinoco Delta the mean monthly temperature ranges from 25.4 to 27.2 °C (77.7 to 81.0 °F).

== Flora ==
The composition of the mangrove forests depend on the soil and the salinity of the water. Mixed stands of Rhizophora and Avicennia species are found in areas of higher salinity, particularly in the extreme northwest. Rhizophora and Laguncularia species grow in channels with more fresh water, and Rhizophora, Avicennia and Laguncularia grow where the soil contains more organic matter. The higher zones hold forests dominated by Avicennia species while herbaceous vegetation grows in the more saline swamps.

There are diverse habitats in the Orinoco delta. The most saline parts have formations of Rhizophora mangle, Rhizophora harrisonii and Rhizophora racemosa. In less saline areas further inland Rhizophora species and the palm Mauritia flexuosa grow together in peat bogs. In other parts of the delta the Rhizophora species mingle with swamp forest species such as Pterocarpus officinalis, Symphonia globulifera, açaí palm (Euterpe oleracea) and Roystonea species. There are wide belts of Rhizophora in the inner estuary, with Avicennia on higher ground, sometimes mixed with Pterocarpus officinalis, Symphonia globulifera and Vitex species.

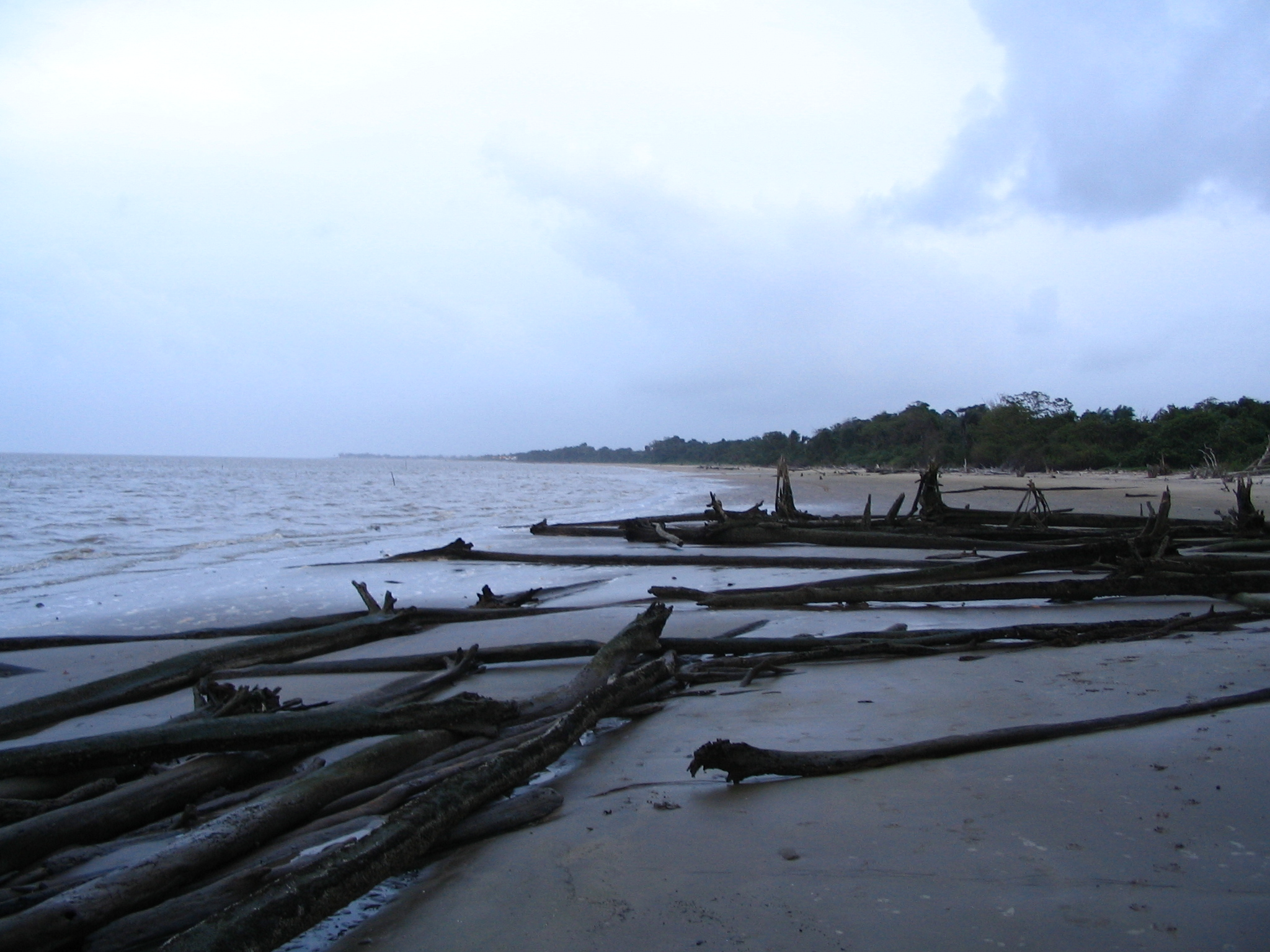
Beach in Kourou, French Guiana, where it starts to turn into a mangrove

Along the coast from eastern Venezuela to the Guyanas the mangroves form belts a few meters wide associated with deciduous forests, muddy meadows and muddy forests in flooded areas. Dominant species include Costus arabicus, Cyperus giganteus, Eichhornia crassipes, Heliconia psittacorum, Roystonea regia and Mauritia flexuosa. Muddy forests on ground that is almost always flooded have a single dense stratum of trees with heights from 15 to 25 metres (49 to 82 ft) such as Pterocarpus officinalis, Symphonia globulifera, Tabebuia aquatilis, açaí palm (Euterpe oleracea), Manicaria species and Mauritia flexuosa. The mangrove belts hold Laguncularia racemosa on the seaward side, mixed with Spartina species of salt marsh grass, in front of stands of Avicennia germinans.

== Fauna ==
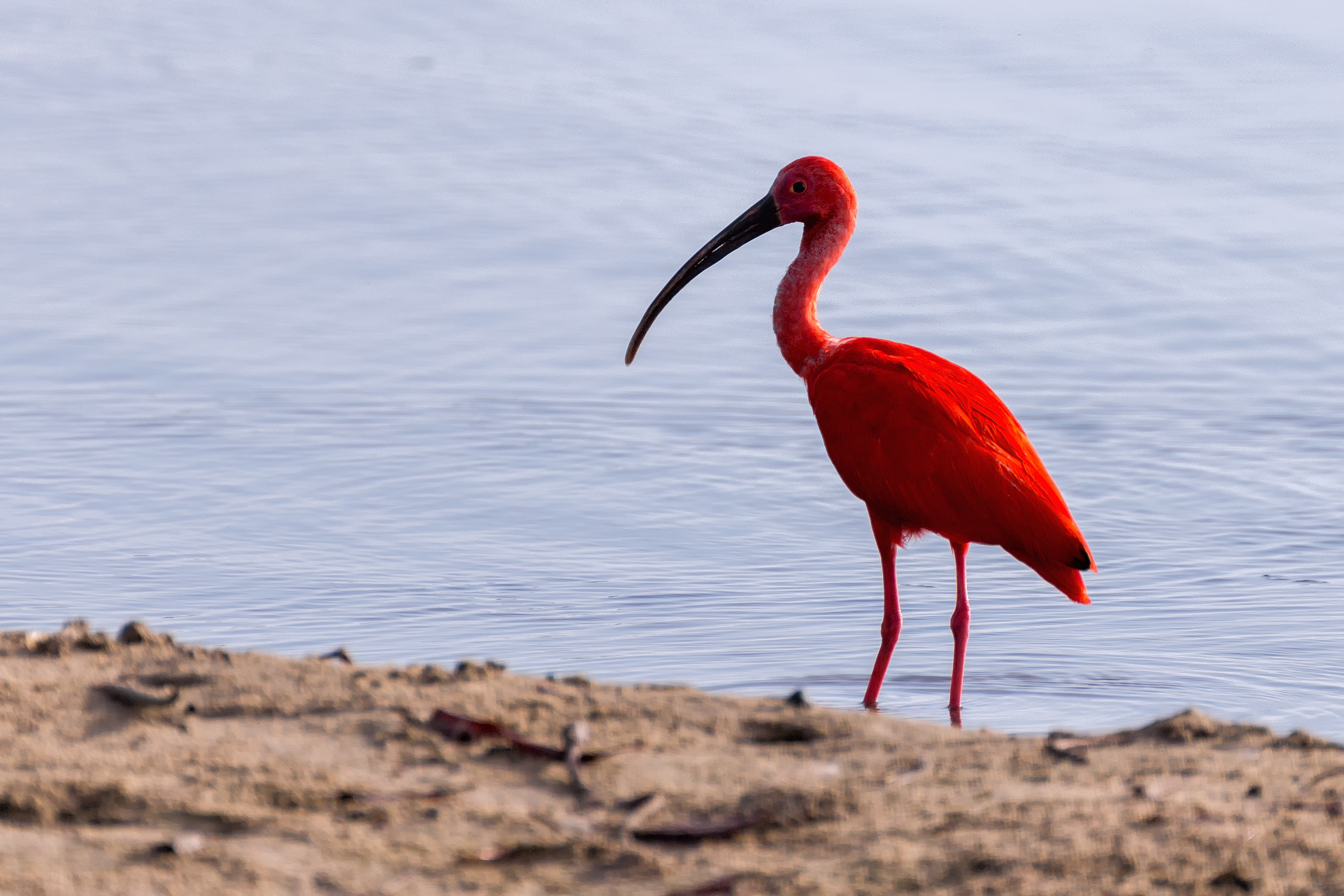
scarlet ibis (Eudocimus ruber)

The ecoregion has diverse fauna. It is the largest area in South America where migrating shorebirds from the Nearctic realm spend the winter, with up to 5 million birds visiting in one year. Over 118 species of birds have been recorded in Suriname and Venezuela, of which more than 70 are waterbirds. Bird species include scarlet ibis (Eudocimus ruber), black skimmer (Rynchops niger), gull-billed tern (Gelochelidon nilotica), short-billed dowitcher (Limnodromus griseus), lesser yellowlegs (Tringa flavipes), greater yellowlegs (Tringa melanoleuca), black-bellied whistling duck (Dendrocygna autumnalis) and tricolored heron (Egretta tricolor).

More than 50 species of mammals have been recorded, including opossums, bats, tufted capuchin (Sapajus apella), common squirrel monkey (Saimiri sciureus), Venezuelan red howler (Alouatta seniculus), white-faced saki (Pithecia pithecia), giant anteater (Myrmecophaga tridactyla), jaguar (Panthera onca), cougar (Puma concolor), ocelot (Leopardus pardalis) and capybara (Hydrochoerus hydrochaeris). The paradoxal frog (Pseudis paradoxa) and the common Suriname toad (Pipa pipa) have adapted to the saline conditions. Reptiles include olive ridley sea turtle (Lepidochelys olivacea), which nests on the beaches, green iguana (Iguana iguana), spectacled caiman (Caiman crocodilus) and green anaconda (Eunectes murinus).

== Status ==
The World Wildlife Fund gives the ecoregion the status of "Relatively Stable/Intact". There are many protected areas, and large sections of mangroves are intact. Suriname has at least seven protected areas, most with a degree of connectivity, including the Coppename Monding wetland and the Wia-Wia nature reserve. Venezuela has the 2,650 square kilometres (1,020 sq mi) Mariusa National Park and the 8,765 square kilometres (3,384 sq mi) Orinoco Delta Biosphere Reserve. The Guarapiche Forest Reserve in the San Juan delta holds a 45,000 hectares (110,000 acres) patch of mangroves, palms and swamp forests.

Agriculture such as rice cultivation has caused some fragmentation, but most fragmentation is natural. The main threats come from logging to obtain building material, fuel, tannin and medicinal products. Upstream agriculture releases fertilizers and pesticides, and adds sediments due to erosion. Population growth and tourism are increasing use of the mangroves as a source of food such as shrimp and wildlife, or for grazing domestic animals. Unsuccessful hydraulic engineering has damaged the Orinoco delta environment, and oil prospecting is a concern.

== Sources ==
- Guianan-Amazon Mangroves, WWF Global
- Tognetti, Sylvia; Burdette, Christine; Schipper, Jan, Eastern South America: Coastal French Guiana, Suriname, Guyana, and southeastern Venezuela (NT1411)
- WildFinder, WWF: World Wildlife Fund
