= Amazon–Orinoco–Southern Caribbean mangroves =

Ecoregion in South America

Amazon–Orinoco–Southern Caribbean mangroves (NT1401)
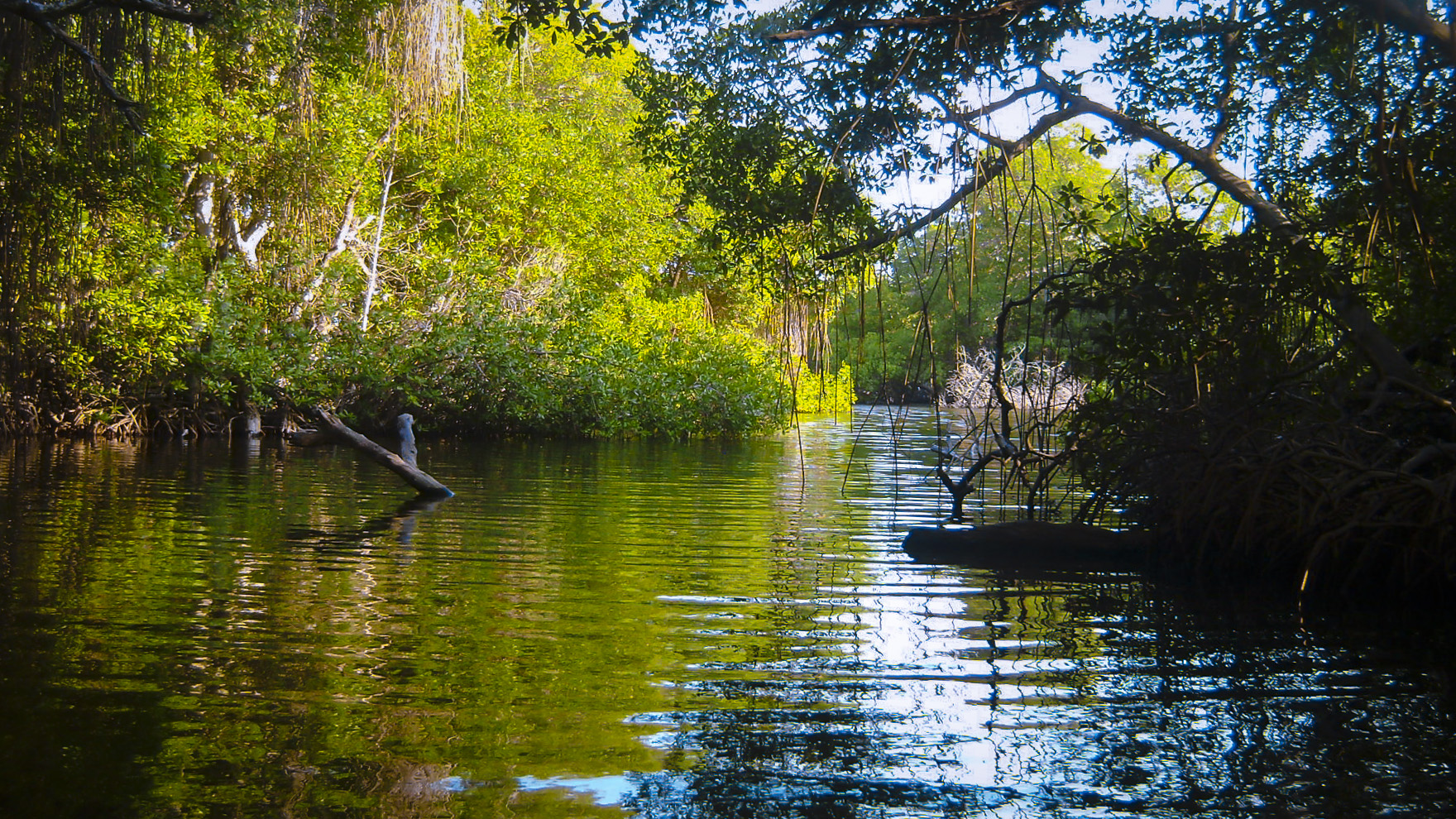
- Morrocoy National Park

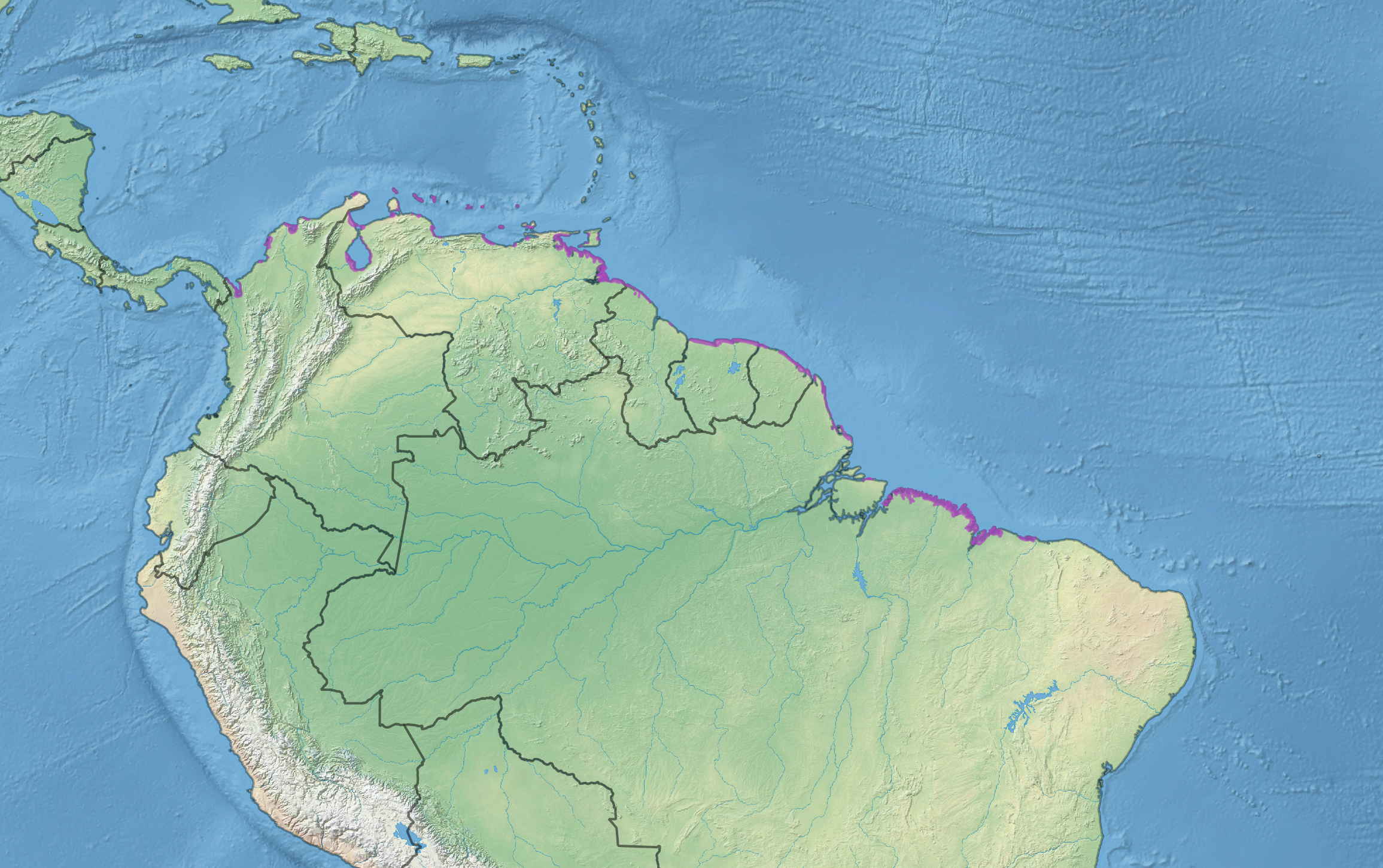
- Map of the Amazon-Orinoco-Southern Caribbean Mangroves Ecoregion (purple)

Ecology
- Realm: Neotropical
- Biome: Mangrove

Geography
- Countries: List: Brazil; Colombia; French Guiana; Guyana; Suriname; Venezuela
- Coordinates: 5.982°N 55.595°W
- Geology: Eastern Venezuela, Falcón, Guajira, Maracaibo, Marajó, Pará-Maranhão, Sinú San Jacinto, Urabá Basin
- Rivers: Amazon, Orinoco
- Climate type: Af: equatorial, fully humid

The Amazon–Orinoco–Southern Caribbean mangroves (NT1401) is an ecoregion along the coasts of Colombia, Venezuela, Guyana, Suriname, French Guiana and Brazil.

== Location ==
The Amazon-Orinoco-Southern Caribbean mangroves cover stretches of the northern, Caribbean, coasts of Colombia and Venezuela, and of the Atlantic coasts of Venezuela, Guyana, Suriname, French Guiana and northeast Brazil. It includes sections of the coasts of the Brazilian states of Amapá, Pará and Maranhão. The eastern part of the ecoregion makes up the 31,855 square kilometres (12,299 sq mi) Guianan–Amazon Mangroves global ecoregion, which in turn is made up of the Guianan mangroves, Amapá mangroves, Pará mangroves, and Maranhão mangroves terrestrial ecoregions.

Along the Caribbean coast the mangroves are found along sections of Guajira–Barranquilla xeric scrub, Sinú Valley dry forests, Paraguana xeric scrub, Lara–Falcón dry forests, La Costa xeric shrublands, Cordillera de la Costa montane forests, Araya and Paria xeric scrub, Aruba–Curaçao–Bonaire cactus scrub, Orinoco wetlands and Orinoco Delta swamp forests, which extend along the coast into the Atlantic. Along the Atlantic coast the mangroves are found along sections of Guianan moist forests, Paramaribo swamp forests, Uatuma–Trombetas moist forests, Guianan savanna, Marajó várzea, Tocantins–Araguaia–Maranhão moist forests, Maranhão Babaçu forests and Northeastern Brazil restingas.

== Ecology ==
The ecoregion is in the Neotropical realm and the mangrove biome.

=== Climate ===
The Köppen climate classification is "Af": equatorial, fully humid. At a sample location inland from the coast at 4.75°N 56.25°W in the Raleigh Falls - Voltzberg Nature Reserve the temperatures are relatively stable throughout the year. The average yearly minimum is 22 °C (72 °F) and maximum 31 °C (88 °F) with a mean temperature of 26.3 °C (79.3 °F). Annual rainfall averages about 2,500 millimetres (98 in). Monthly rainfall varies from 56.6 millimetres (2.23 in) in October to 360.7 millimetres (14.20 in) in May.

=== Flora ===
The Guianan–Amazon Mangroves have five species of mangroves, often distributed into different zones of salinity. There are also bushes and marches with dense, tall grasses.

=== Fauna ===
The Guianan–Amazon Mangroves support very diverse populations of fish and migratory birds, as well as other wildlife. Typical species of fauna include scarlet ibis (Eudocimus ruber), American flamingo (Phoenicopterus ruber), magnificent frigatebird (Fregata magnificens), loggerhead sea turtle (Caretta caretta), hawksbill sea turtle (Eretmochelys imbricata), green sea turtle (Chelonia mydas), leatherback sea turtle (Dermochelys coriacea), West Indian manatee (Trichechus manatus), American crocodile (Crocodylus acutus), and giant otter (Pteronura brasiliensis).

Endangered mammals include black-headed spider monkey (Ateles fusciceps), white-cheeked spider monkey (Ateles marginatus), black bearded saki (Chiropotes satanas), cotton-top tamarin (Saguinus oedipus) and giant otter (Pteronura brasiliensis). Endangered amphibians include Lesser Antilles robber frog (Pristimantis urichi). Endangered reptiles include green sea turtle (Chelonia mydas), hawksbill sea turtle (Eretmochelys imbricata), Miyata's scaly-eyed gecko (Lepidoblepharis miyatai), Kemp's ridley sea turtle (Lepidochelys kempii) and Maranhão slider (Trachemys adiutrix). Endangered birds include sapphire-bellied hummingbird (Lepidopyga lilliae).

== Status ==
The World Wildlife Fund classes the Guianan–Amazon Mangroves as "Relatively Stable/Intact". Threats include urbanization, industrial pollution and agricultural sediments.

Protected areas include the Archipiélago Los Roques National Park, Bush Bush Wildlife Sanctuary, Caroni Swamp Wildlife Sanctuary, Central Range Wildlife Sanctuary, Imataca Forest Reserve, Kronstadt Island Wildlife Sanctuary, Mochima National Park, Morrocoy National Park, Northern Range Wildlife Sanctuary, Trinity Hills Wildlife Sanctuary, Valencia Wildlife Sanctuary.
