= Rhizophora harrisonii =

Scientific classification
- Kingdom: Plantae
- Clade: Embryophytes
- Clade: Tracheophytes
- Clade: Angiosperms
- Clade: Eudicots
- Clade: Rosids
- Order: Malpighiales
- Family: Rhizophoraceae
- Genus: Rhizophora
- Species: R. harrisonii

Binomial name
- Rhizophora harrisonii Alleyne Leechman, 1918

Synonyms
- Rhizophora × brevistyla Salvoza

Species of flowering plant

Rhizophora harrisonii is a species of plant in the family Rhizophoraceae. It can be found in Brazil, Cameroon, Colombia, Costa Rica, Ecuador, Guyana, French Guiana, Honduras, Nicaragua, Panama, Suriname, Trinidad, Tobago, and Venezuela.

Plants of the World Online considers it a naturally occurring hybrid of Rhizophora mangle and Rhizophora racemosa, as Rhizophora x harrisonii.

== Description ==
It is a tree that reaches a size of up to 20 m high. It has elliptical leaves, 11–15 cm long and 4–7 cm wide, the acute apex, the cuneate base, glabrous, undersides with black dots. The inflorescence of 5–12 cm long, 3-5 times branched, with many flowers, peduncle 2–7 cm long, with bracts thick, bifid; pedicels 3–11 mm long, flowers 1 cm long; stamens 8; oval or slightly elliptical floral bud, acute apex. Oval-lanceolate fruit, 4 cm long and 1.5 cm wide, radicle 11–25 cm long.

== Distribution and habitat ==
Rhizophora harrisonii is native to both the Tropical Atlantic and the Tropical Eastern Pacific. In the Atlantic basin it ranges along the Atlantic coast of Africa from Angola to Senegal, and along the Atlantic, Caribbean, and Gulf of Mexico coasts of South and Central America from northeastern Brazil to eastern Mexico. In the eastern Pacific it ranges from southern Mexico to Peru.

Being a component of the mangrove communities, gentleman mangroves are usually associated with other mangrove species such as Avicennia tonduzii Moldenke, Avicennia bicolor Stand., Avicennia germinans (L.) L., Avicennia schaueriana Stapt & Leechm., Laguncularia racemosa (L.) Gaertn. f., Pelliciera rhizophorae Tr. & Pl. And Rhizophora mangle L.

== Taxonomy ==
Rhizophora harrisonii was described by Alleyne Leechman and published in Bulletin of Miscellaneous Information Kew 1918 (1): 8, f. A, in the year 1918.

In 2023, Xavier Cornejo and Carmita Bonifaz argued that R. brevistyla, which had been treated as a synonym, is a valid name for an eastern Pacific red mangrove, based on previously published molecular studies.

=== Etymology ===
Rhizophora : generic name that derives from the Greek words: ριζα (rhiza), which means "root" and φορος (phoros), which means "support", referring to the piles of the base.

harrisonii: epithet awarded in honor of the director of the Director of Science and Agriculture in British Guiana, Sir John Bunchmore Harrison.

brevistyla: derived from the Latin brevis ("short") and stylus ("style"), referring to the relatively short style that Salvoza (1936) used as one of the characters distinguishing the species.
