= Marajó várzea =

Ecoregion in the Amazon biome

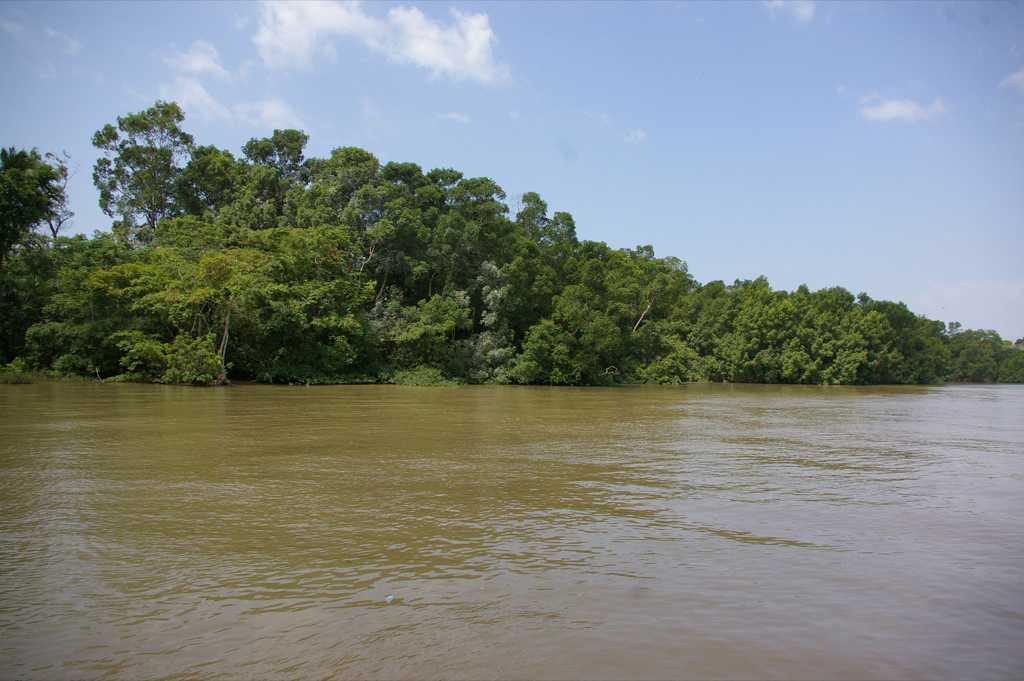
- Marajó island

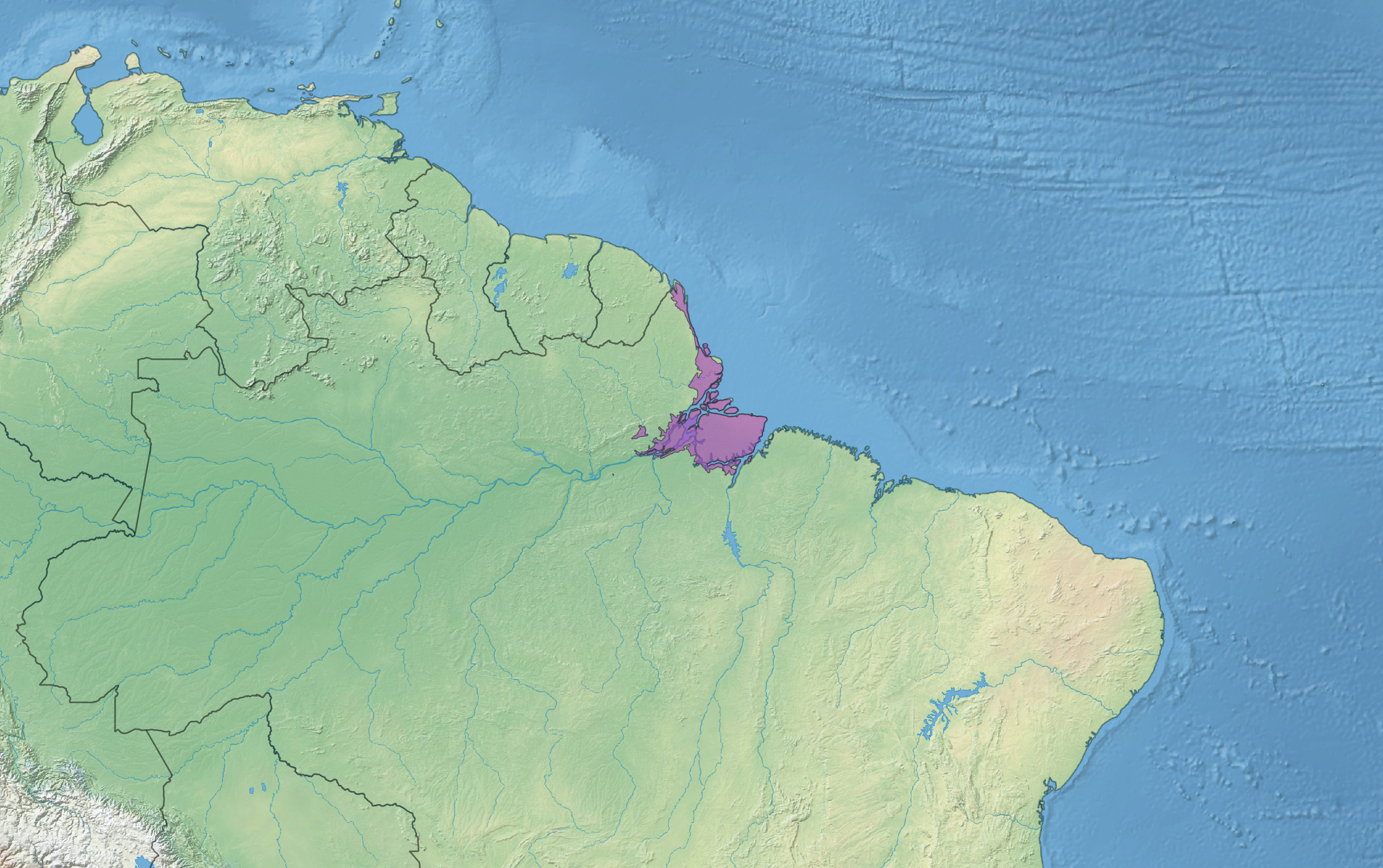
- Map of the Marajó Várzea Ecoregion (purple)

Ecology
- Realm: Neotropical
- Biome: Tropical and subtropical moist broadleaf forests – Amazon

Geography
- Area: 88,577.59 km^{2} (34,200.00 sq mi)
- Country: Brazil
- Coordinates: 0.444°N 50.323°W

The Marajó várzea (NT0138) is an ecoregion of seasonally and tidally flooded várzea forest in the Amazon biome. It covers a region of sedimentary islands and floodplains at the mouth of the Amazon that is flooded twice daily as the ocean tides push the river waters onto the land. The flooded forests provide food for a wide variety of fruit-eating fish, aquatic mammals, birds and other fauna. It has no protected areas and is threatened by cattle and water-buffalo ranching, logging and fruit plantations.

== Location ==
Location in Brazil

The Marajó várzea is at the mouth of the Amazon River. It covers coastal areas of the states of Pará and Amapá, with an area of 8,857,759 hectares (21,888,000 acres). Water levels are affected by freshwater flowing down the river and by tidal flows from the Atlantic Ocean. The várzea forest in the ecoregion starts where the Xingu River joins the Amazon, which begins to broaden out. It covers the west of Marajó Island and many smaller islands in the Amazon channel, as well as parts of the mainland to the north and south of the river mouth including a small area of French Guiana. The nutrient-rich sediments from the river are deposited on the islands.

The Marajó várzea ecoregion adjoins the Xingu–Tocantins–Araguaia moist forests and the Tocantins–Araguaia–Maranhão moist forests to the south, and the Uatuma–Trombetas moist forests and an area of Guianan savanna to the north. The Gurupa várzea is upstream along the Amazon. There are strips of Amazon–Orinoco–Southern Caribbean mangroves along the coast. The Amapá mangroves are found to the north of the Amazon's mouth and the Pará mangroves to the south.

== Physical ==
The Marajó várzea covers flooded land at the mouth of the 6,500 kilometres (4,000 mi) Amazon River. There are many islands including the 48,000 square kilometres (19,000 sq mi) Marajó island and the smaller Porcos, Pará, Mututí and Uituquara islands. The estuary is a recent lowland that has been forming during the present Holocene epoch, and is surrounded by Tertiary deposits. The constant action of tides and river flow form a maze of channels. Twice daily the tides push river discharge onto the low-lying land to a depth of 2 to 3 metres (6 ft 7 in to 9 ft 10 in). Soils in the many islands formed from the Amazon sediments are typically mottled clay with poor drainage.

The ecoregion also includes slightly higher ground that is usually not flooded. The east of Marajó island is made of older Tertiary sediments. It is covered by flooded savanna and humid terra firme forest.

== Climate ==
The Köppen climate classification is "Am": equatorial with monsoon rainfall. Average annual temperatures are about 28 °C (82 °F), ranging from about 22.7 to 31.6 °C (72.9 to 88.9 °F) Average annual precipitation is about 2,600 millimetres (100 in). Monthly rainfall varies from 33 millimetres (1.3 in) in October to over 420 millimetres (17 in) in March.

== Ecology ==
The ecoregion is in the Neotropical realm and the tropical and subtropical moist broadleaf forests biome.

=== Flora ===
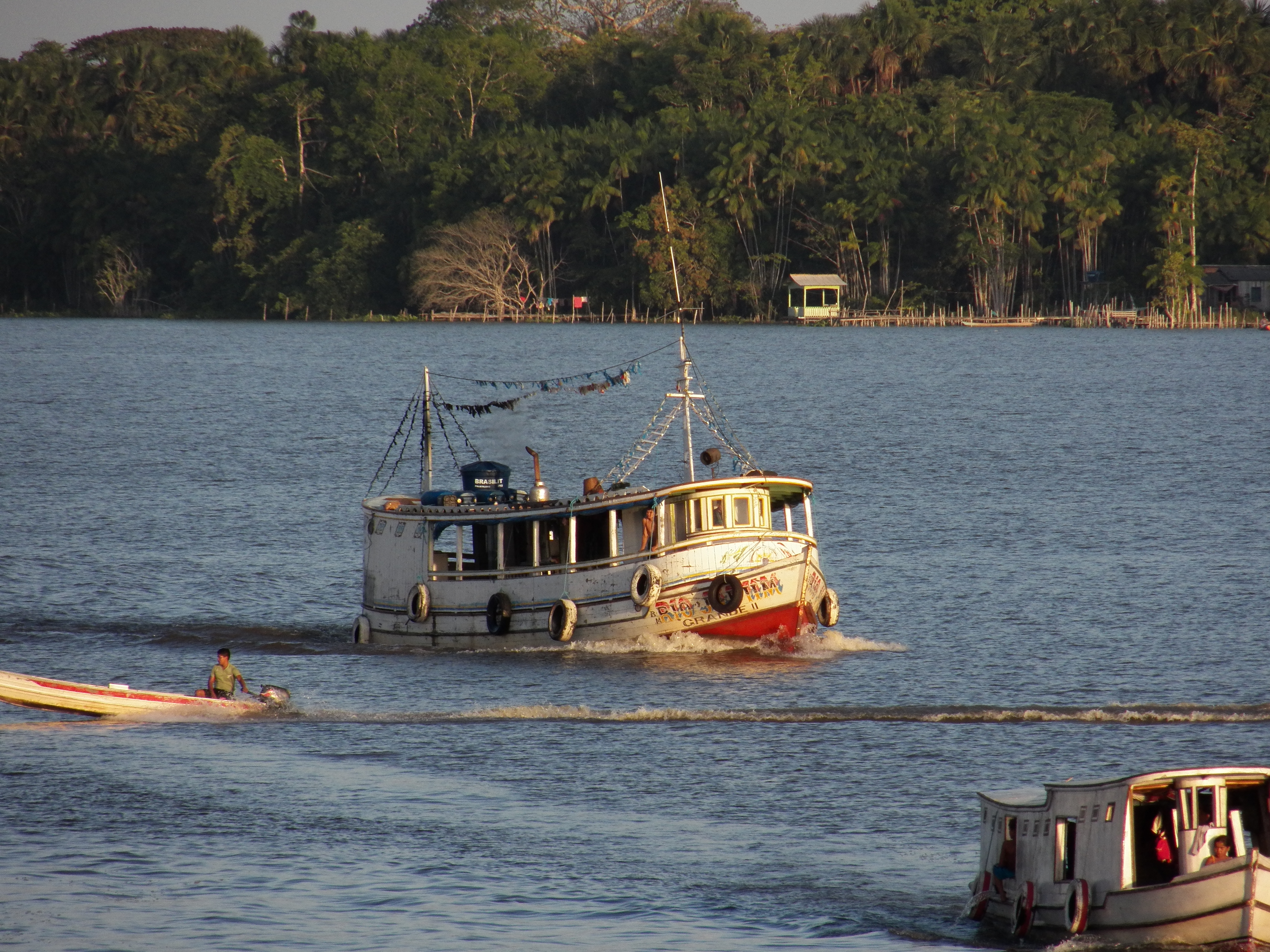
River traffic in the fluvial zone

Vegetation is dominated by palms, and is shorter and less diverse than in surrounding areas. The most common palm species are murumuru (Astrocaryum murumuru), raffia (Raphia taedigera), açaí (Euterpe oleracea), maripa (Attalea maripa), bacaba (Oenocarpus bacaba), patauá (Oenocarpus bataua), buriti (Mauritia flexuosa), ubuçu (Manicaria saccifera), cashapona (Socratea exorrhiza) and several species of Geonoma palms. There are large stands of the commercially valuable buriti and acai palms.

Among other common trees in the tidal várzea are the timber species Virola surinamensis, Cedrelinga castanaeformis, Ceiba pentandra, Calycophyllum brasiliensis and other large trees such as Ficus species, Macrolobium acaciifolium, Pachira aquatica, Symphonia globulifera, Triplaris surinamensis and Mora paraensis. The shrub Machaerium lanatum forms dense thickets along the banks of the rivers. There are large lianas in the flooded areas such as Strychnos blackii, Landolphia paraensis and Guatteria scandens. The ecoregion also includes seasonally flooded forest and permanently flooded igapó swamp forest.

=== Fauna ===
The várzea forest provides a mechanism for rapid capture and release of nutrients, and hosts many species of freshwater fish and aquatic mammals. There is greater diversity of fauna than in surrounding areas. 99 species of mammals have been reported. Big cats include jaguar (Panthera onca) and cougar (Puma concolor). Fruiting trees such as the buriti palm are sources of food for grazing animals such as gray brocket (Mazama gouazoubira), red brocket (Mazama americana), and capybara (Hydrochoerus hydrochaeris). The estuary is home to large fish that swim through the flooded forest where they eat and spread fruit from the trees. Fish include pacus (Metynnis and Mylossoma genera), tambaqui (Colossoma macropomum), pirarucus (Arapaima gigas), and sardinhas (Triportheus angulatus).

Endangered species include the white-cheeked spider monkey (Ateles marginatus), black bearded saki (Chiropotes satanas), giant otter (Pteronura brasiliensis), green sea turtle (Chelonia mydas) and hawksbill sea turtle (Eretmochelys imbricata). The endemic short-tailed opossum (Monodelphis maraxina) is endangered. Other endemic mammals are the seven-banded armadillo (Dasypus septemcinctus), Recife broad-nosed bat (Platyrrhinus recifinus), Brazilian funnel-eared bat (Natalus espiritosantensis), Greenhall's dog-faced bat (Cynomops greenhalli), silvery marmoset (Mico argentatus), red-handed tamarin (Saguinus midas), Azara's night monkey (Aotus azarae) and crab-eating fox (Cerdocyon thous). The ecoregion is home to the endangered West Indian manatee (Trichechus manatus).

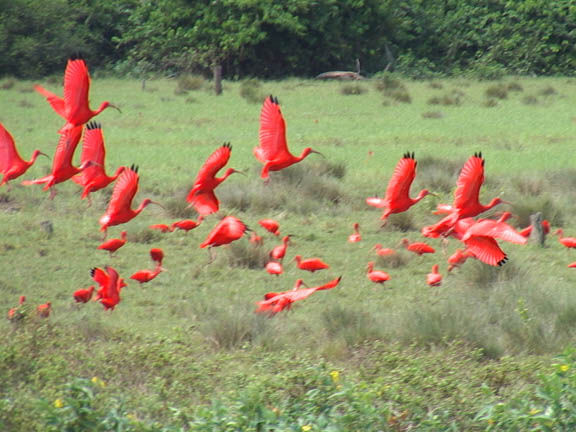
Scarlet ibis (Eudocimus ruber) on Marajó island

There are at least 540 species of birds. Aquatic bird species include heron and egret of the Egretta and Ardea genera, whistling duck (Dendrocygna species), sharp-tailed ibis (Cercibis oxycerca), Theristicus species and roseate spoonbill (Platalea ajaja). Endemic birds include white-bellied seedeater (Sporophila leucoptera), grassland yellow finch (Sicalis luteola), chalk-browed mockingbird (Mimus saturninus), tropical pewee (Contopus cinereus), rufous-throated antbird (Gymnopithys rufigula), black-breasted puffbird (Notharchus pectoralis) and plain-bellied emerald (Amazilia leucogaster). Endangered birds include the scaled spinetail (Cranioleuca muelleri) and yellow-bellied seedeater (Sporophila nigricollis).

== Conservation status ==
The ecoregion is in a region of the Amazon at the mouth of the great waterway that has long been heavily used by humans. It is vulnerable, and has no protected areas. Cattle and water buffalo ranches have degraded natural grasslands and forests and caused loss of food sources for capybaras, manatees and fruteating fish. Commercial logging on Marajó island has almost eliminated some valuable native tree species. Stands of Açaí palm planted for their commercially valuable fruit have replaced stands of native buriti palm. Global warming will force tropical species to migrate uphill to find areas with suitable temperature and rainfall. Low, flat ecoregions such as the Marajó várzea are extremely vulnerable.

== Sources ==
- Amazon Basin Ecoregions, Yale University, archived from the original on 2021-01-23
- Feeley, Kenneth J.; Rehm, Evan (2013), Amazon’s vulnerability to climate change heightened by deforestation and man-made dispersal barriers (PDF), Miami, FL: Florida International University, archived from the original (PDF) on 2017-04-04
- "Marajó varzea", Global Species, Myers Enterprises II
- Sears, Robin, Northern Brazil at the mouth of the Amazon River, WWF: World Wildlife Fund
- Tognetti, Sylvia S.; Burdette, Christine, Northern South America: Northern Brazil (NT1402), WWF: World Wildlife Fund
- Tognetti, Sylvia S.; Burdette, Christine; (b), Northeastern Brazil (NT1427)
- WildFinder, WWF: World Wildlife Fund
