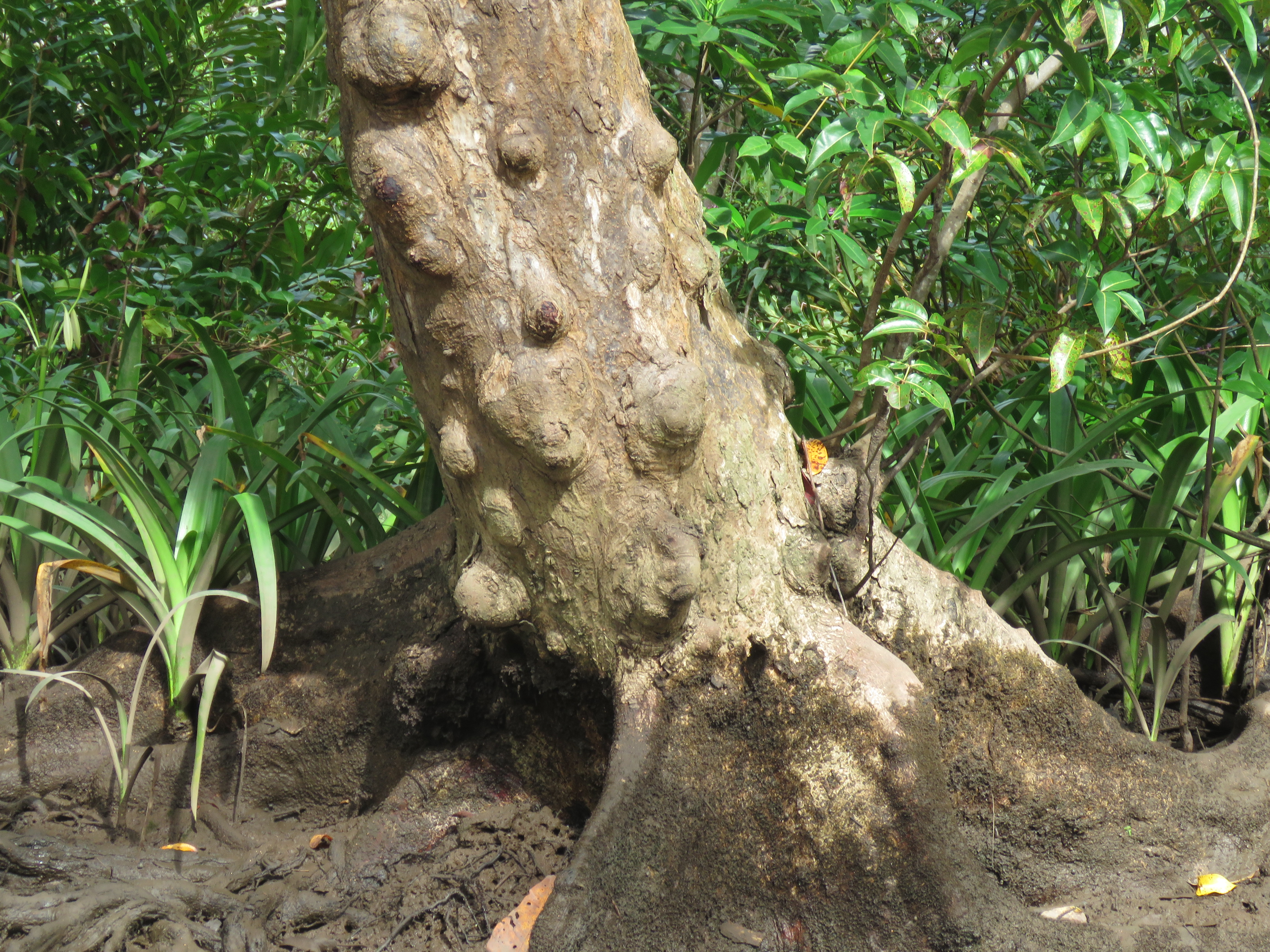
- Trunk
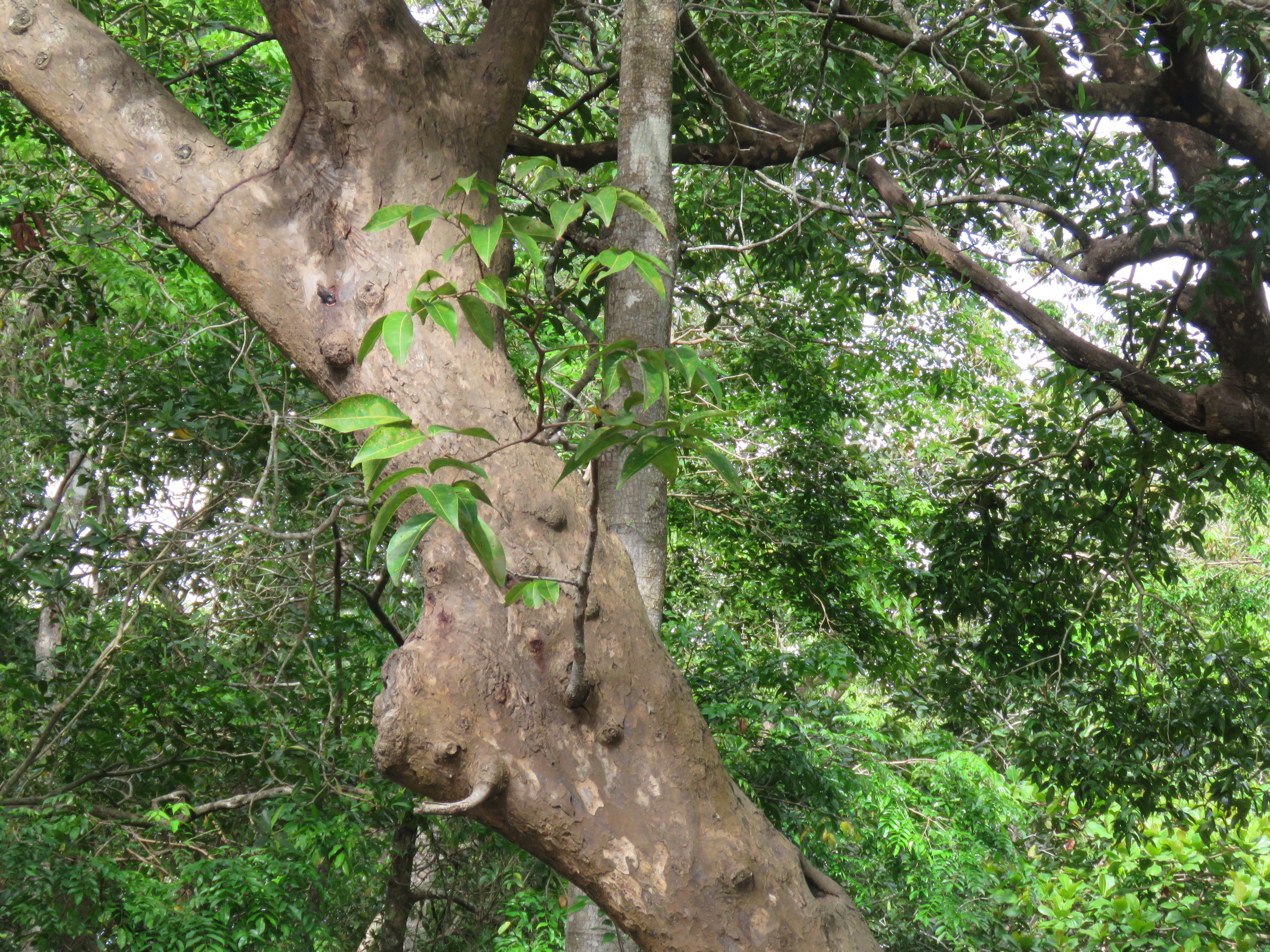
- Upper stem and foliage

Scientific classification
- Kingdom: Plantae
- Clade: Tracheophytes
- Clade: Angiosperms
- Clade: Eudicots
- Clade: Rosids
- Order: Fabales
- Family: Fabaceae
- Subfamily: Caesalpinioideae
- Genus: Mora
- Species: M. oleifera

Binomial name
- Mora oleifera (Triana ex Hemsl.) Ducke

Synonyms
- Dimorphandra oleifera Triana ex Hemsl.; Dimorphandra megistosperma Pittier; Mora megistosperma (Pittier) Britton & Rose

= Mora oleifera =

Species of rainforest tree

Mora oleifera (syn. Mora megistosperma) is a species of rainforest tree in the bean family Fabaceae, cassia subfamily Caesalpinioideae. It is commonly called mora or mangle nato, and is found in Nicaragua, Costa Rica, Panama, Colombia, and Ecuador. It grows 45 metres (148 ft) in height and up to 4 m (13 ft) diameter at breast height. It is noted for producing the largest seeds of any dicot plant (bean-shaped, typical of the family); and up to 18 cm (7 in) long by 15 cm (6 in) wide, and up to 10 cm (4 in) thick. and can weigh up to 1 kg (2.2 lb), and is exceeded only by Lodoicea maldivica and Cocos nucifera. This seed is in a single-seeded legume which develops from a tiny flower only 1 mm in width. These white flowers are in little spikes about 12 cm (5 in) long. The leaves are paripinnate with just two pairs of ovate or oblong leaflets, each leaflet up to 18 cm (7 in) long. The wood is very heavy and rich in tannins.
