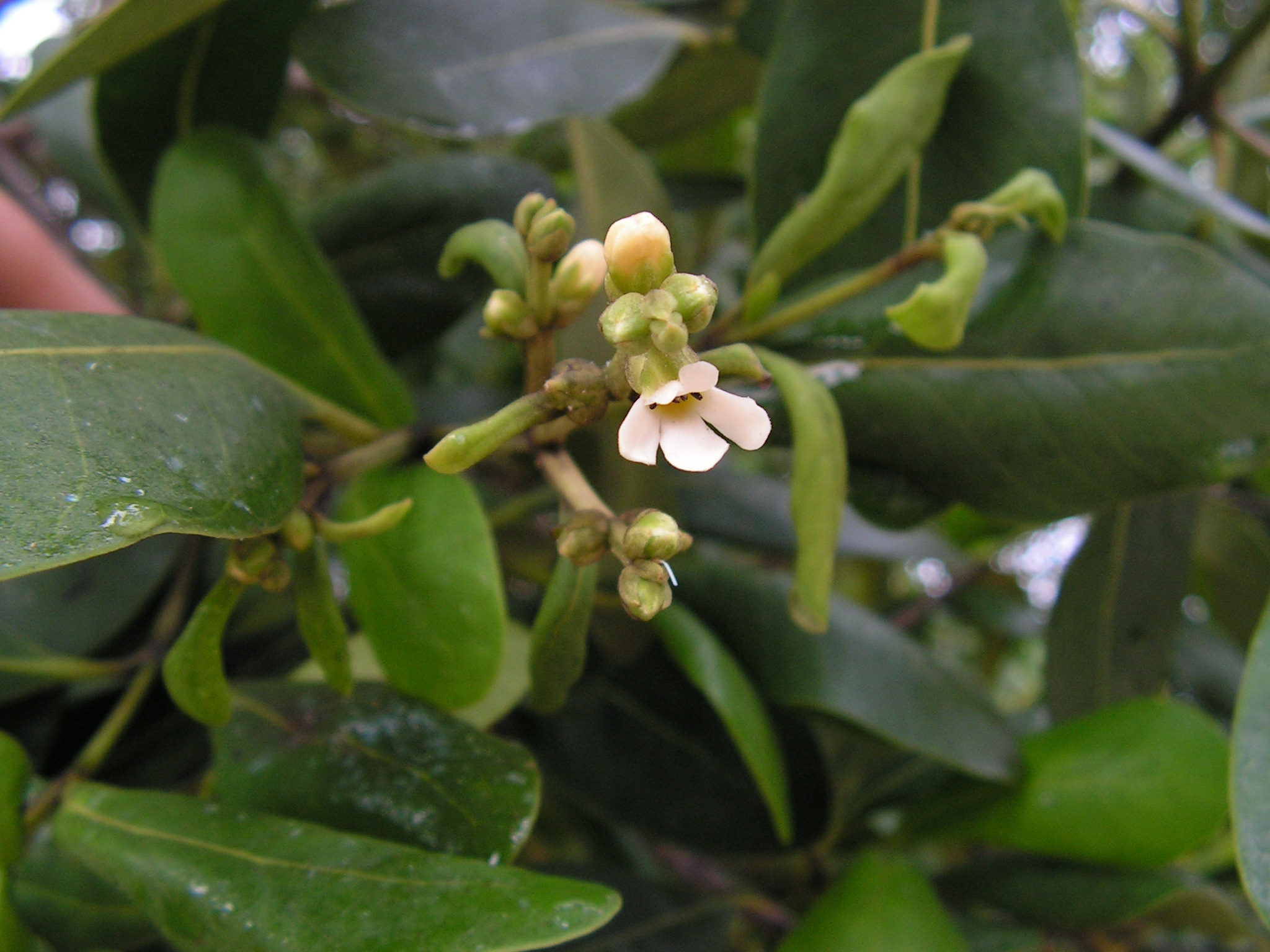
- Leaves and flower of Avicennia schaueriana

Conservation status
- Least Concern (IUCN 3.1)

Scientific classification
- Kingdom: Plantae
- Clade: Tracheophytes
- Clade: Angiosperms
- Clade: Eudicots
- Clade: Asterids
- Order: Lamiales
- Family: Acanthaceae
- Genus: Avicennia
- Species: A. schaueriana

Binomial name
- Avicennia schaueriana Stapf & Leechm. ex Moldenke

Synonyms
- Avicennia schaueriana f. candicans Moldenke; Avicennia schaueriana f. glabrescens Moldenke; Avicennia tomentosa Schauer nom illeg.; Hilairanthus schauerianus (Stapf & Leechm. ex Moldenke) Cornejo

= Avicennia schaueriana =

Species of plant

Avicennia schaueriana is a species of tropical mangrove in the family Acanthaceae. It grows in coastal and estuarine locations along the Atlantic coast of northeastern South America, from Venezuela and the Leeward Islands through Trinidad and Tobago, the Windward Islands, the Guianas, and Brazil to Uruguay.

Avicennia schaueriana is self-compatible and insect-pollinated (bees and wasps, butterflies and moths, and flies).
