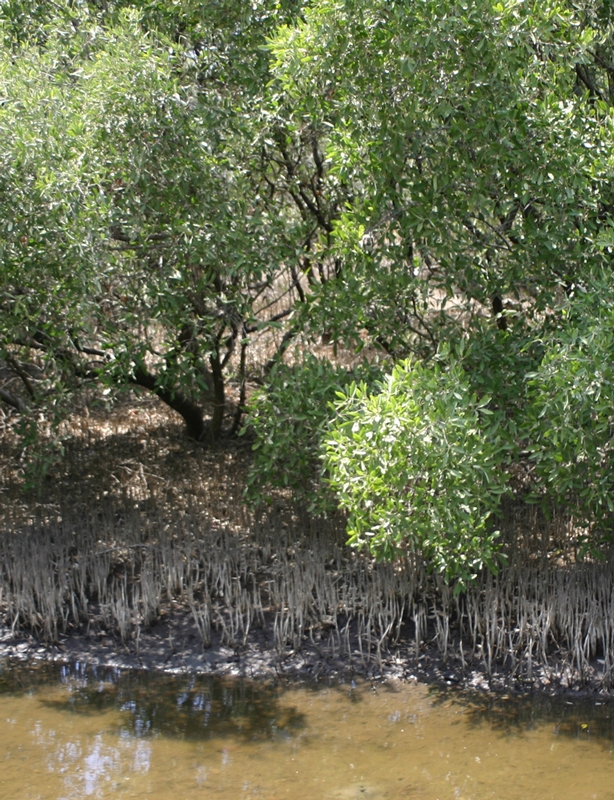
- Black mangrove growing in Guanacaste Province, Costa Rica

Conservation status
- Least Concern (IUCN 3.1)

Scientific classification
- Kingdom: Plantae
- Clade: Tracheophytes
- Clade: Angiosperms
- Clade: Eudicots
- Clade: Asterids
- Order: Lamiales
- Family: Acanthaceae
- Genus: Avicennia
- Species: A. germinans

Binomial name
- Avicennia germinans (L.) L.
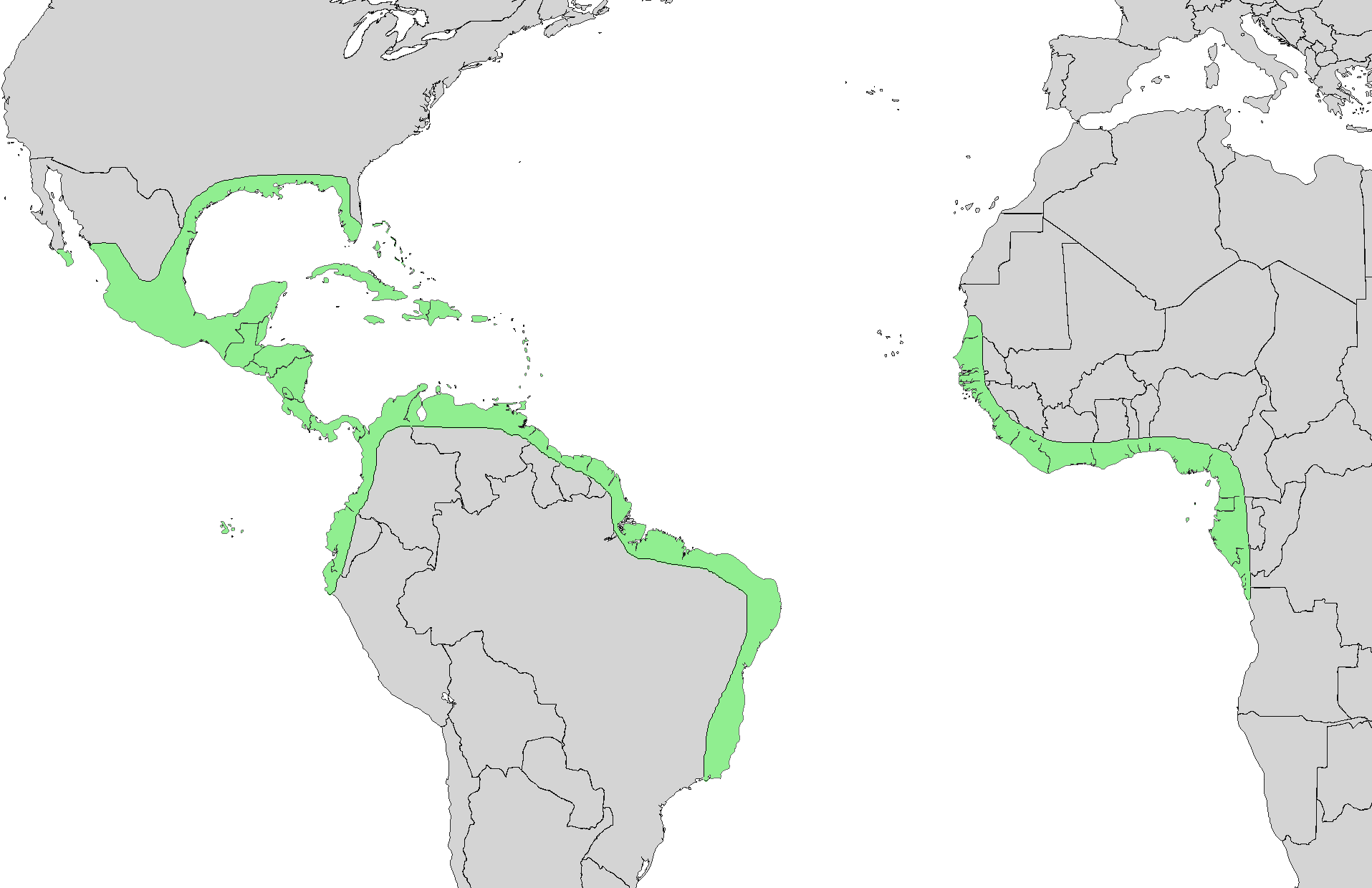
- Distribution of Avicennia germinans

Synonyms
- Avicennia africana P.Beauv.; Avicennia elliptica Thunb.; Avicennia elliptica var. martii Moldenke; Avicennia floridana Raf.; Avicennia floridana Gand.; Avicennia germinans f. aberrans Moldenke; Avicennia germinans f. brasiliensis Moldenke; Avicennia germinans f. venezuelensis Moldenke; Avicennia germinans var. guayaquilensis (Kunth) Moldenke; Avicennia germinans var. cumanensis (Kunth) Moldenke; Avicennia lamarckiana C.Presl; Avicennia meyeri Miq.; Avicennia nitida Jacq.; Avicennia nitida Sessé & Moc.; Avicennia nitida var. trinitensis Moldenke; Avicennia oblongifolia Nutt. ex Chapm.; Avicennia officinalis var. lanceolata Kuntze; Avicennia officinalis var. nitida Kuntze; Avicennia tomentosa Jacq.; Avicennia tomentosa var. campechensis Jacq.; Avicennia tomentosa var. cumanensis Kunth; Avicennia tomentosa var. guayaquilensis Kunth; Bontia germinans L.; Hilairanthus nitidus (Jacq.) Tiegh.; Hilairanthus tomentosus (Jacq.) Tiegh.

= Avicennia germinans =

Black mangrove Temporal range: Calabrian–Present

Species of tree

Avicennia germinans, the black mangrove, is a shrub or small tree growing up to 12 meters (39 feet) in the acanthus family, Acanthaceae. Fossils of the species are known from the Bermont Formation of the Everglades.

== Etymology ==
The name "black mangrove" refers to the color of the trunk and heartwood.

The species name germinans comes from Latin term for germination.

== Description ==
Avicennia germinans grows as either a tree or shrub and reaches heights of 15m (50ft). This plant grows pneumatophores, specialized roots which grow above ground and aid in plant respiration, covering the ground around the tree.

Flowers of Avicennia germinans are fragrant and white with a yellow center. The leaves are simple with opposite arrangement and take on an oval shape with pointed ends. Leaves are both smooth and leathery, with different shades on the top and bottom. Tops of the leaves take on a dark green color while the undersides are grey to whitish. This plant excretes salt through the leaves, which results in salt crystals forming on the top of those leaves.

== Habitat ==
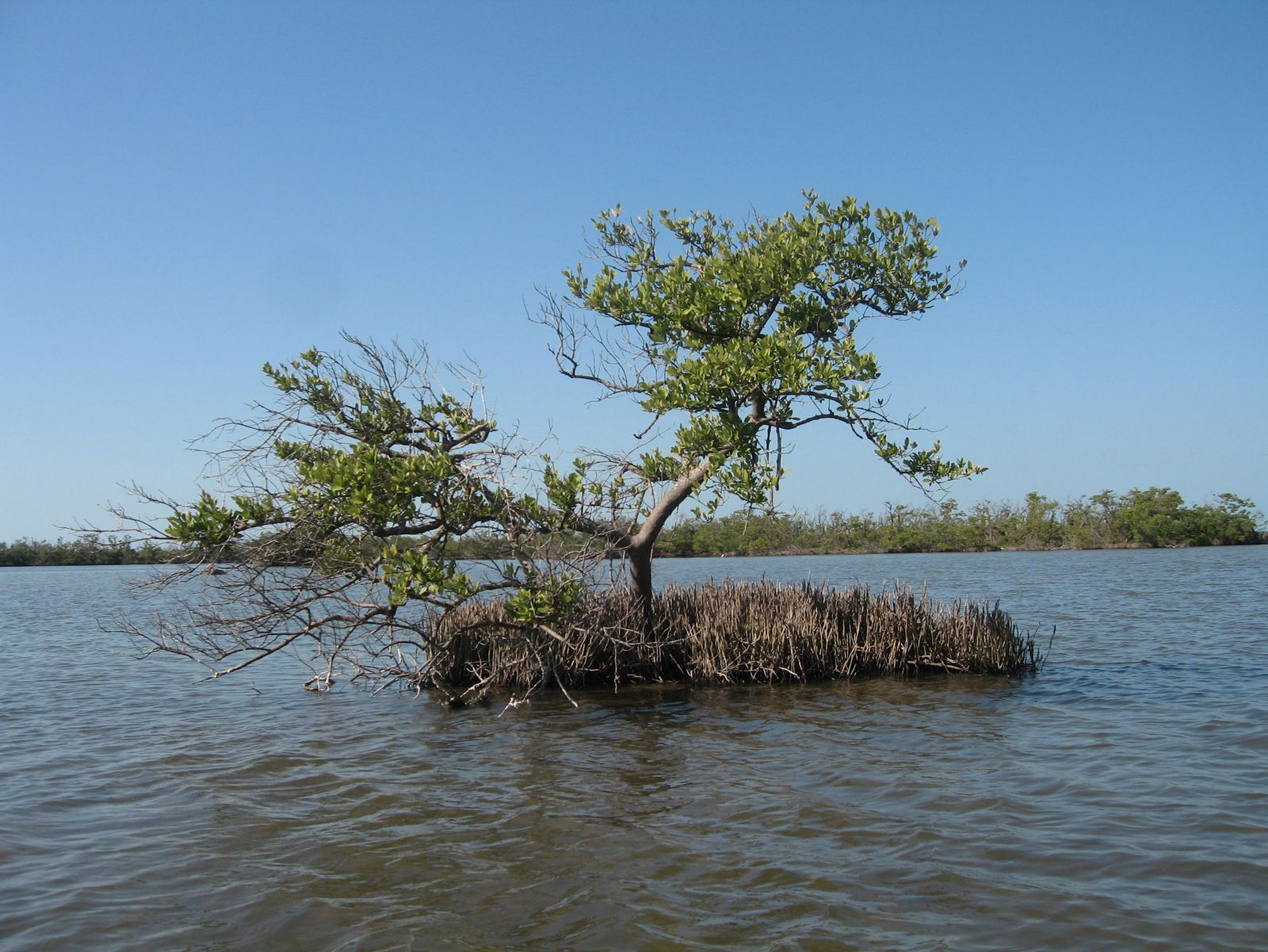
A black mangrove tree growing in shallow water in Everglades National Park

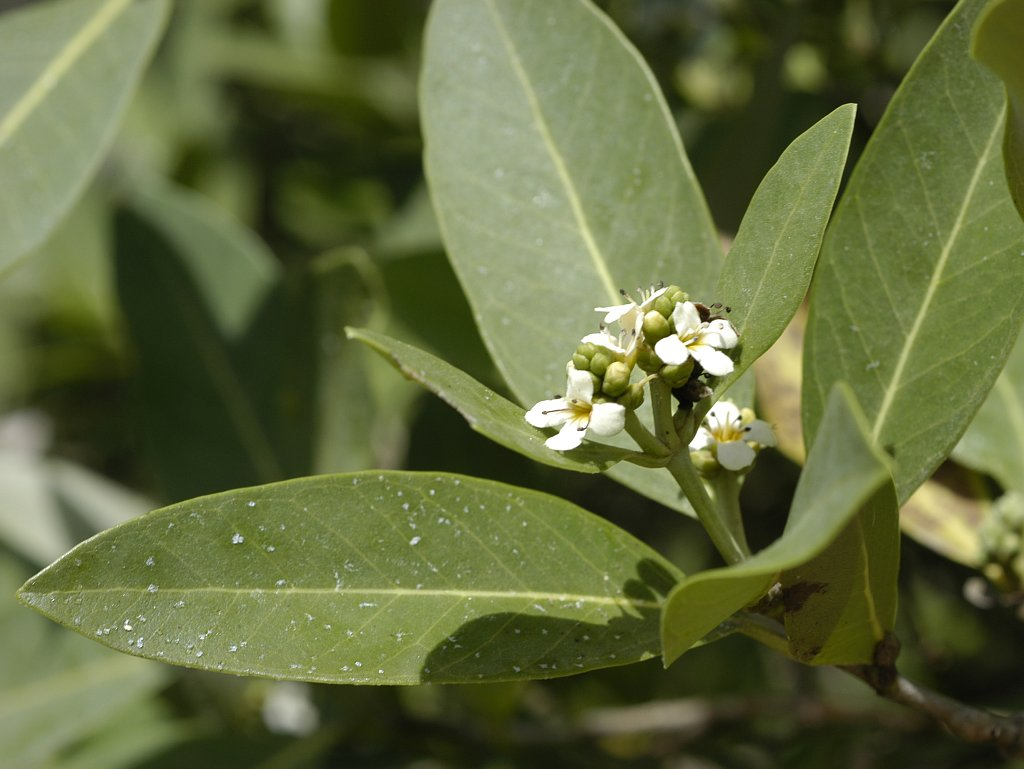
Black mangrove flowers

The black mangrove grows just above the high tide in coastal areas. It grows in tropical and subtropical regions of the Americas, on both the Atlantic and Pacific Coasts, and on the Atlantic Coast of tropical Africa, where it thrives on the sandy and muddy shores where seawater reaches. It is common throughout coastal areas of Texas and Florida, and ranges as far north as southern Louisiana and northern Florida in the United States. It is less tolerant of highly saline conditions than certain other species that occur in mangrove ecosystems. It can reach 10–15 m (33–49 ft) in height, although it is a small shrub in cooler regions of its range. The seeds germinate in midsummer, but may be seen all year on the trees. The seeds can remain viable for over a year once released. The leaves often appear whitish from the salt excreted at night and on cloudy days. It is often found in its native range with the red mangrove (Rhizophora mangle) and the white mangrove (Laguncularia racemosa). White mangroves grow inland from black mangroves, which themselves grow inland from red mangroves. The three species work together to stabilize the shoreline, provide buffers from storm surges, trap debris and detritus brought in by tides, and provide feeding, breeding, and nursery grounds for a great variety of fish, shellfish, birds, and other wildlife.

== Wood ==
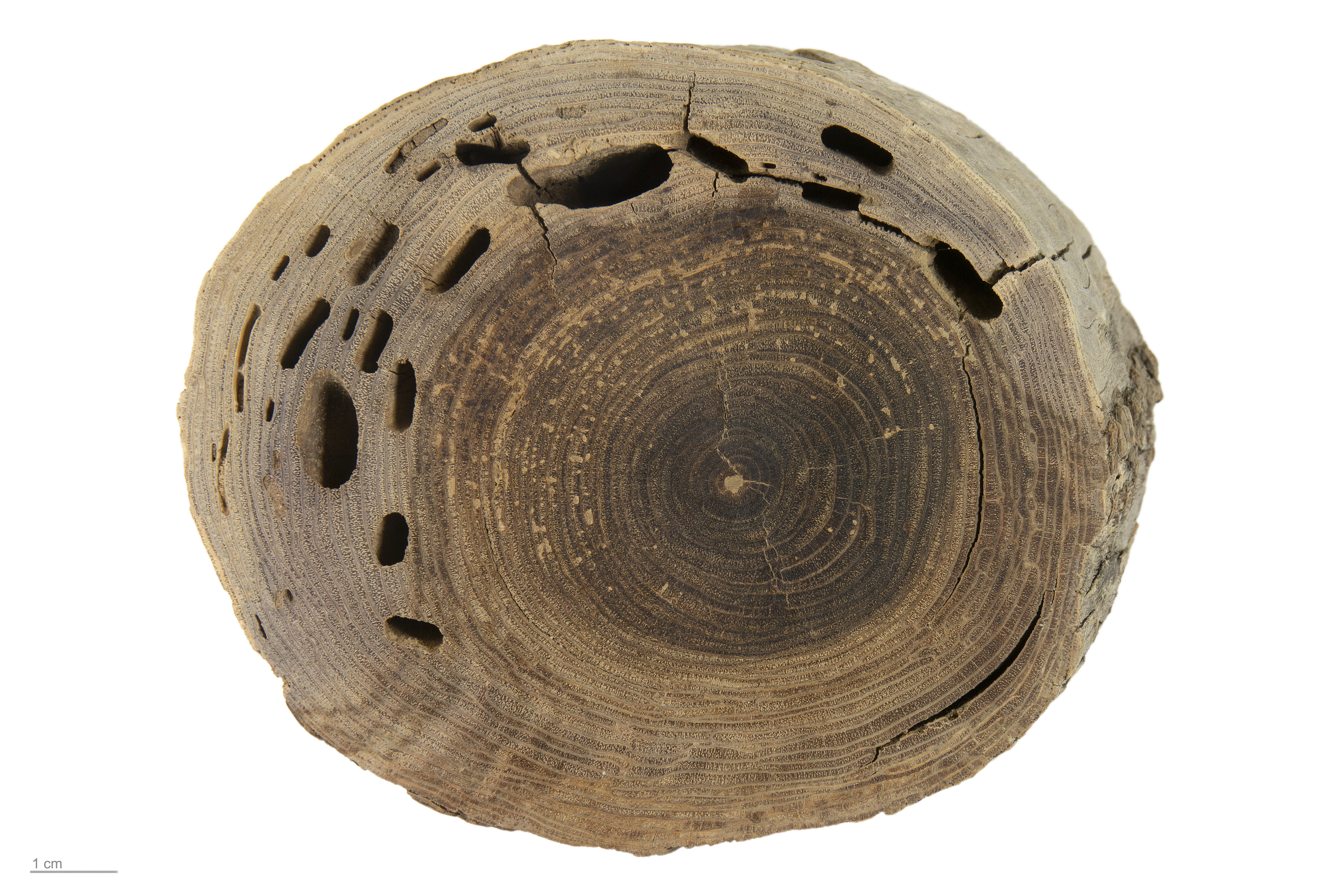
Avicennia germinans (MHNT)

The heartwood is dark-brown to black, while the sapwood is yellow-brown. It has the unusual property of having less dense heartwood than sapwood. The sapwood sinks in water while the heartwood floats. The wood is strong, heavy, and hard, but is difficult to work due to its interlocked grain, and is somewhat difficult to finish due to its oily texture. Uses include posts, pilings, charcoal, and fuel. Despite growing in a marine environment, the dry wood is subject to attack by marine borers and termites. Like many species, it contains tannins in the bark and has been used to tan leather products.
