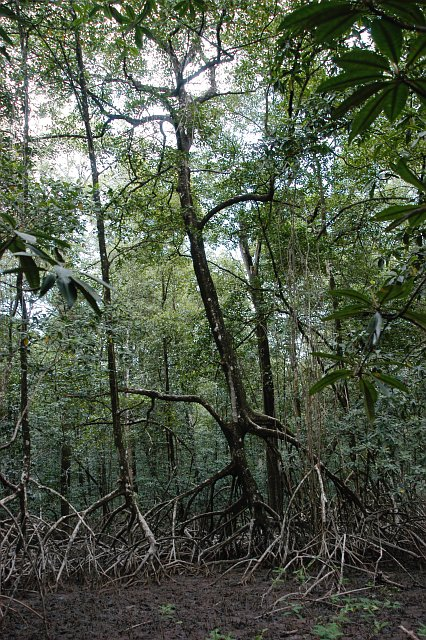

Conservation status
- Least Concern (IUCN 3.1)

Scientific classification
- Kingdom: Plantae
- Clade: Tracheophytes
- Clade: Angiosperms
- Clade: Eudicots
- Clade: Rosids
- Order: Malpighiales
- Family: Rhizophoraceae
- Genus: Rhizophora
- Species: R. racemosa

Binomial name
- Rhizophora racemosa G.Mey.

= Rhizophora racemosa =

Species of tree

Rhizophora racemosa is a species of mangrove tree in the family Rhizophoraceae. It has a patchy distribution on the Pacific coast of Central and South America, occurs in places on the Atlantic coast of that continent, and has a more widespread range on the Atlantic coast of West Africa.

== Description ==
Members of the genus Rhizophora are very similar to each other in morphology. They grow up to 30 m (100 ft) tall often with aerial stilt roots, but in more marginal habitats are shorter, more branched and scrubby. The leaves grow in opposite pairs, each pair with two interlocking stipules. The leaves are simple and entire, with elliptical hairless blades and slightly down-rolled margins. The lower surfaces have numerous tiny corky warts which appear as black spots on dried leaves.

At one time considered to be a subspecies of Rhizophora mangle, R. racemosa is now accepted as a full species, most easily distinguished by the fact that the stem of the axillary flowers branches up to six times, making a maximum cluster size of 128. However, the inflorescences more usually contain 32 to 64 flowers. Other distinguishing characteristics include thick, short rounded bracteoles and rounded flower buds.

== Ecology ==
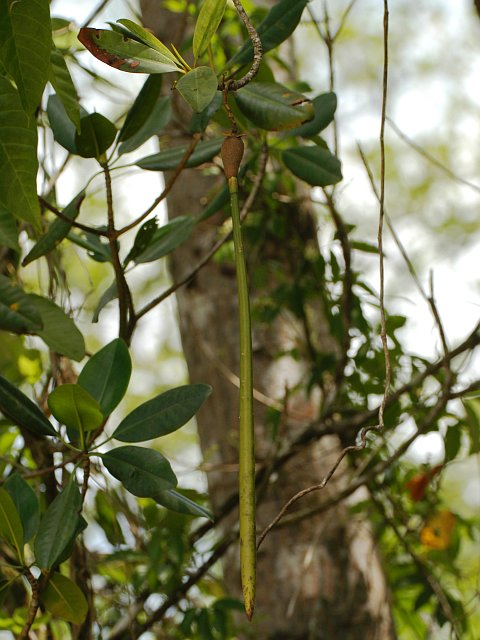
Ripe propagule

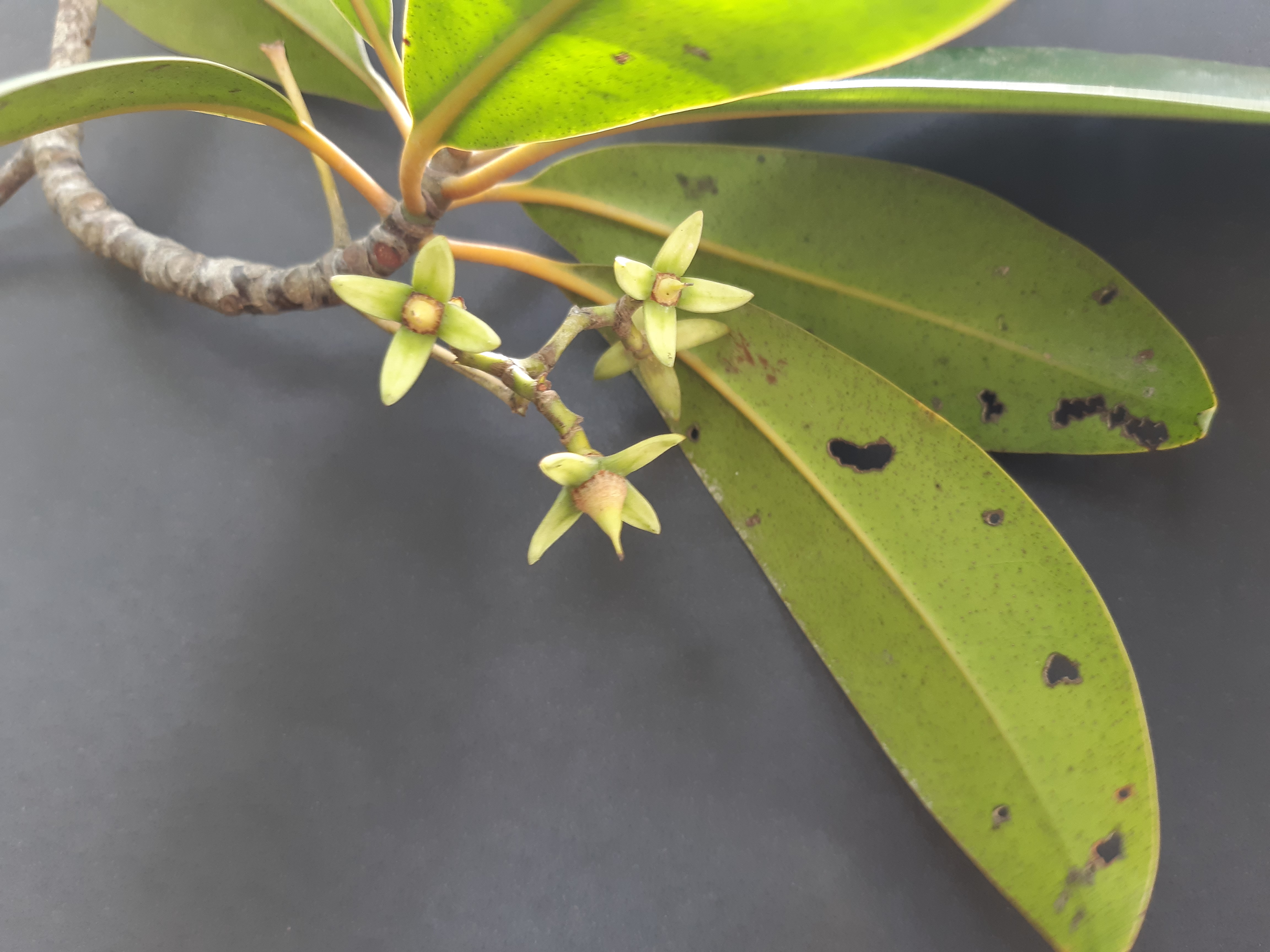
Flowers

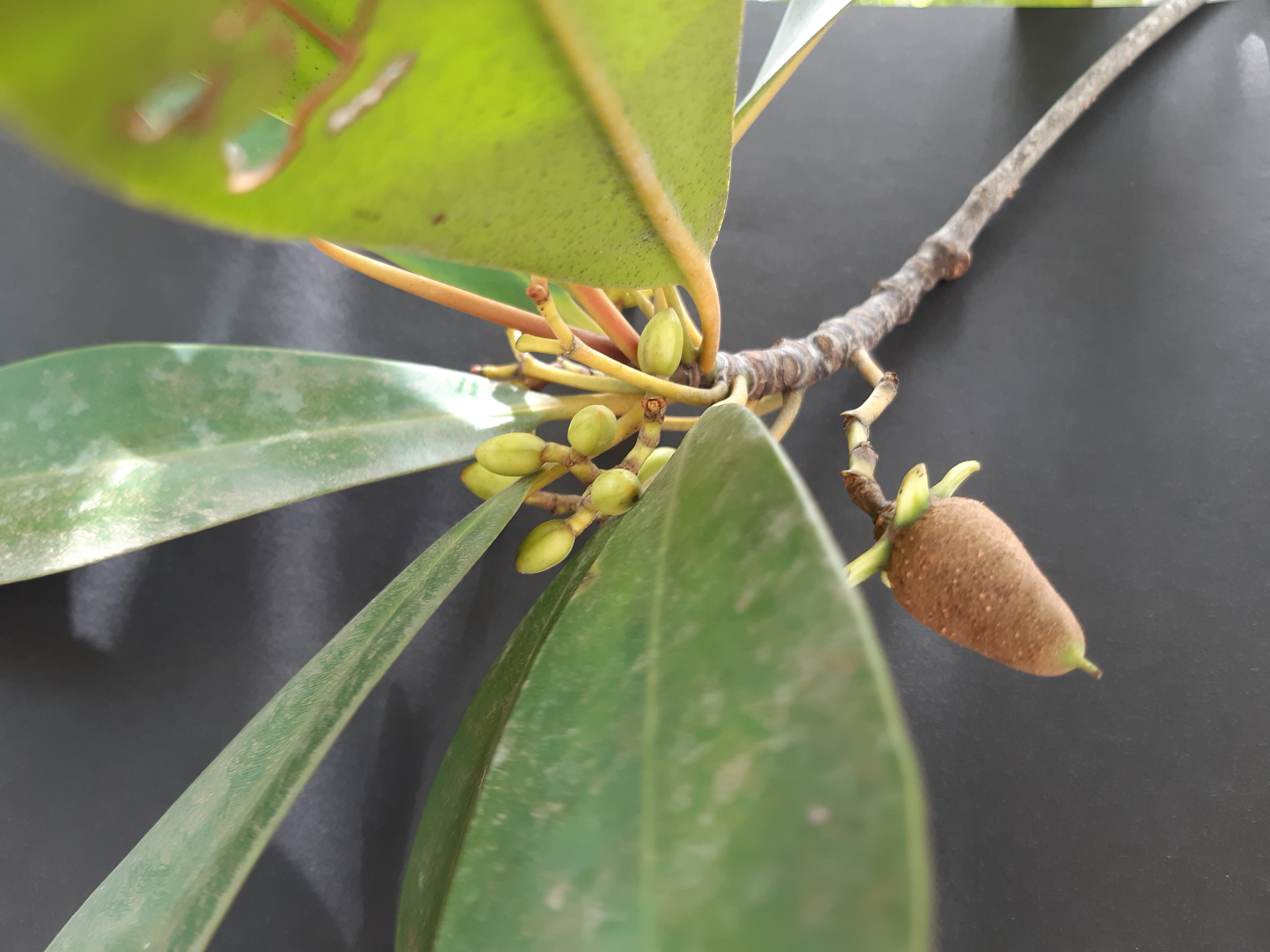

In West Africa, estuaries, bays and lagoons are fringed by tidal mangrove forests, dominated by Rhizophora and Avicennia. When new mudflats are formed, seagrasses are the first plants that grow on the mud, with Rhizophora racemosa, a pioneering species, being the first mangrove to appear. With time, the mud solidifies and more tree and plant species arrive. On the seaward side the trees are short but get steadily taller further inland. The nipa palm (Nypa fruticans) has been introduced to Nigeria and Cameroon and has become invasive, to the detriment of the native mangrove species.

Some insect pollination takes place, but R. racemosa is largely wind-pollinated. The fruit produce propagules which may fall into the water and be dispersed by wind and currents.

== Uses ==
In West Africa, Rhizophora racemosa is used for construction poles and firewood on a limited scale. The smoke has antimicrobial properties and is also used for smoking meat. In the Americas it is less likely to be harvested as it is more scarce and is not considered to be of much value. Extracts from the bark of Rhizophora racemosa has been proven for its potential as an indicator in titration.
