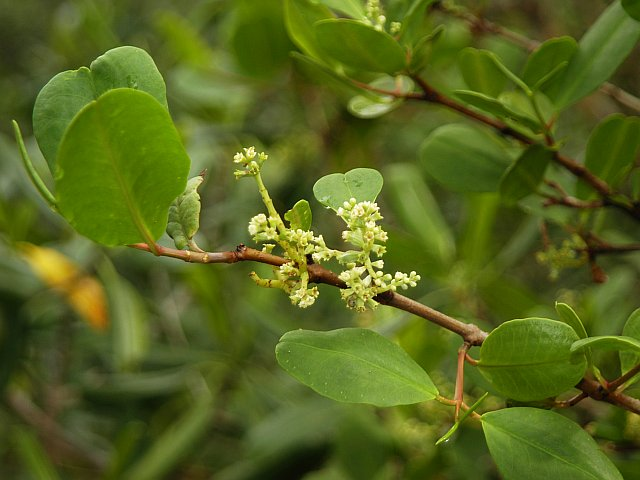
- At Caeté estuary, Bragança, Pará, Brazil

Conservation status
- Least Concern (IUCN 3.1)

Scientific classification
- Kingdom: Plantae
- Clade: Tracheophytes
- Clade: Angiosperms
- Clade: Eudicots
- Clade: Rosids
- Order: Myrtales
- Family: Combretaceae
- Genus: Laguncularia; C.F.Gaertn.
- Species: L. racemosa

Binomial name
- Laguncularia racemosa (L.) C.F.Gaertn.

= Laguncularia =

Genus of flowering plants

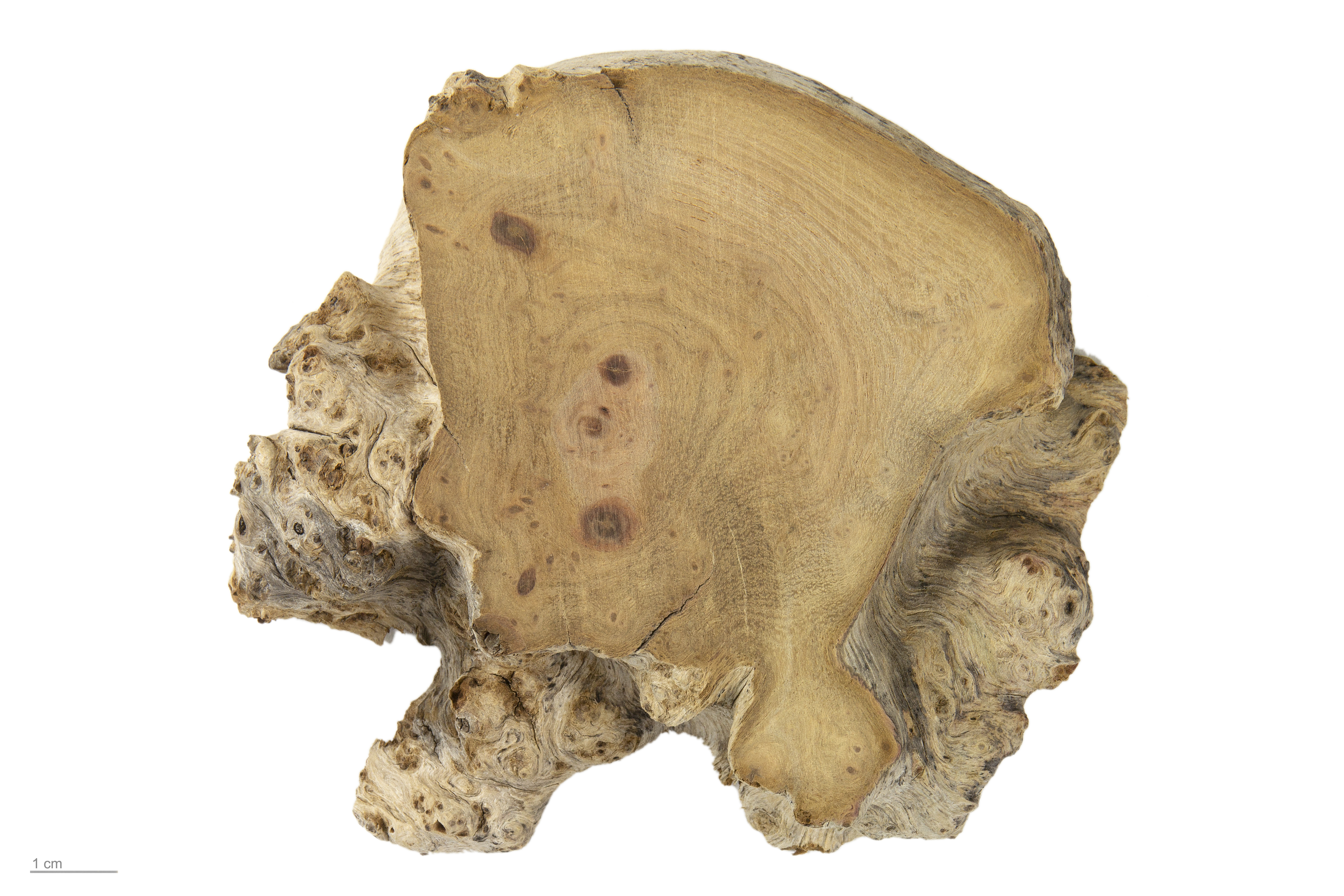
Laguncularia racemosa (MHNT)

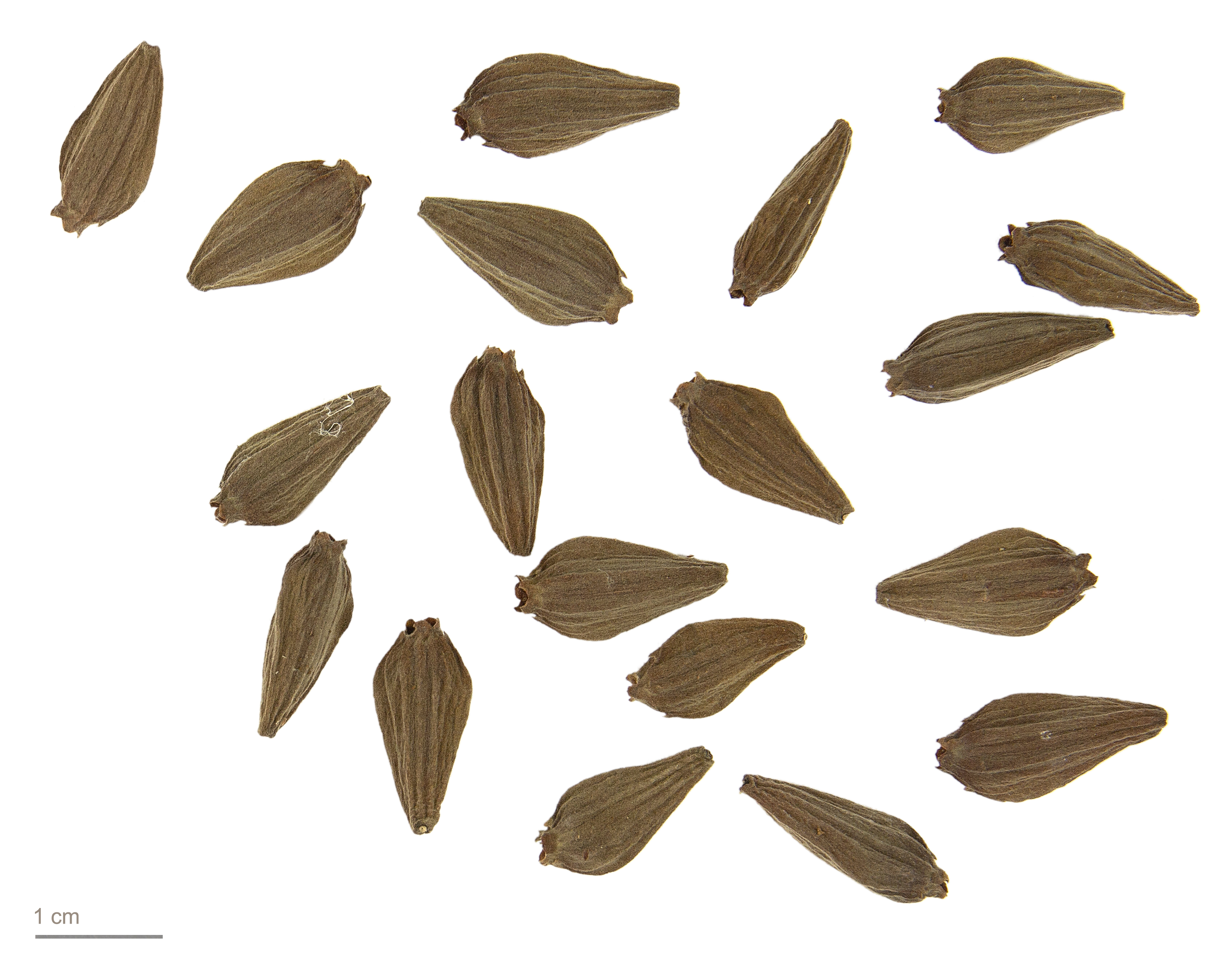
Laguncularia racemosa (MHNT)

Laguncularia is a genus of plants in the family Combretaceae. The only species in the genus is Laguncularia racemosa, the white mangrove.

It is native to the coasts of western Africa from Senegal to Cameroon, the Atlantic Coast of the Americas from Bermuda and Florida to the Bahamas, Mexico, the Caribbean, and south to Brazil; and on the Pacific Coast of the Americas from Mexico to northwestern Peru, including the Galápagos Islands.

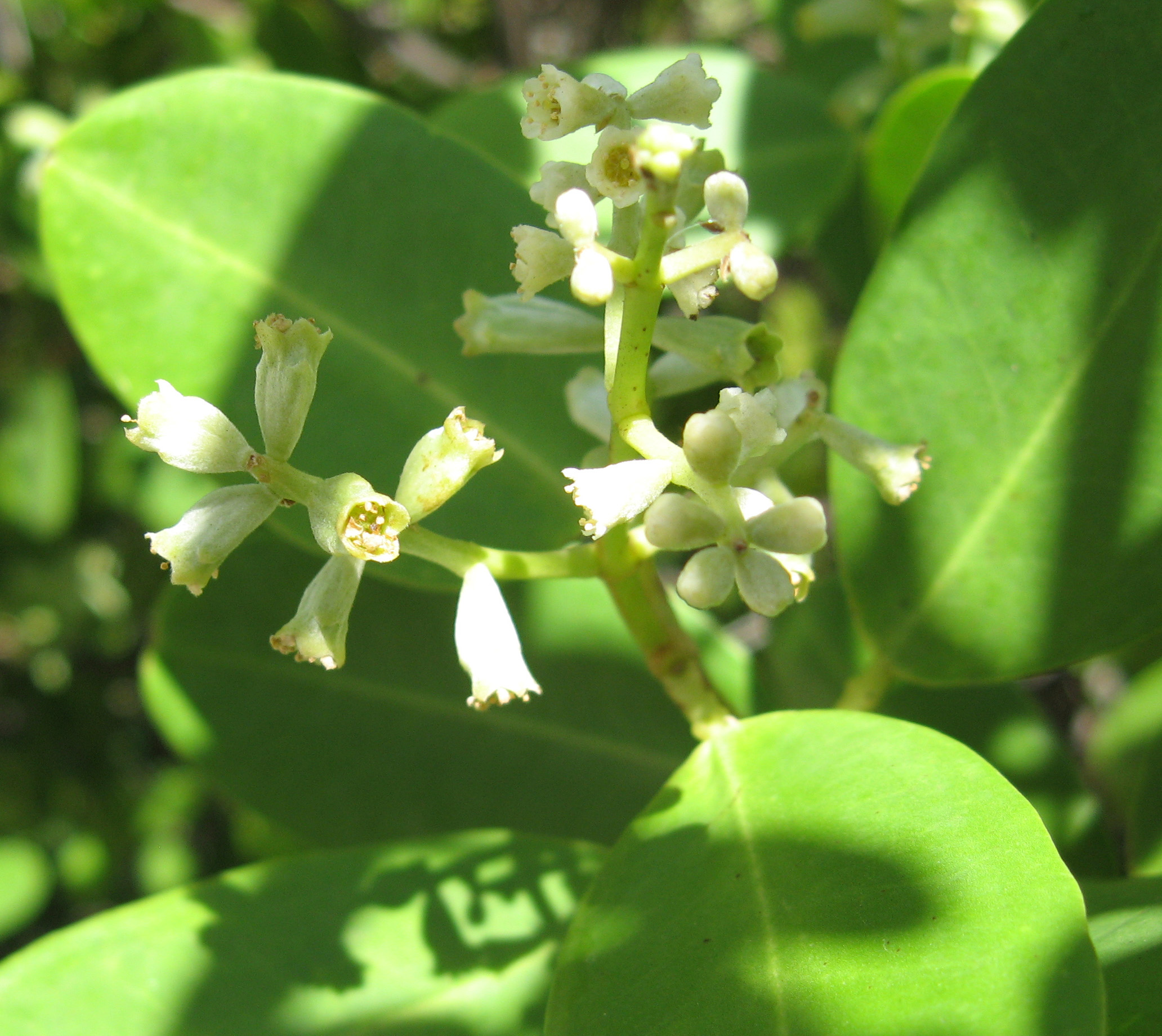
Flowers

It is a mangrove tree, growing to 12–18 m (39–59 ft) tall. The bark is gray-brown or reddish, and rough and fissured. Pneumatophores and/or prop roots may be present, depending on environmental conditions. The leaves are opposite, elliptical, 12–18 cm (4.7–7.1 in) long, and 2.5–5.0 cm (0.98–1.97 in) broad, rounded at both ends, entire, smooth, leathery in texture, slightly fleshy, without visible veins, and yellow-green in color. The petiole is stout, reddish, and 10–13 mm (0.39–0.51 in) long, with two small glands near the blade that exude sugars. The white, bell-shaped flowers are mostly bisexual and about 5 mm (0.20 in) long. The fruit is a reddish-brown drupe, about 12–20 mm (0.47–0.79 in) long, with longitudinal ridges. The single seed is sometimes viviparous.

It grows in coastal areas of bays, lagoons, and tidal creeks, typically growing inland of other mangroves, well above the high tide line.
