= List of Neotropical ecoregions by bioregion =

== Amazonia bioregion ==
=== Tropical and subtropical moist broadleaf forests ===
- Caquetá moist forests (Brazil, Colombia)
- Guianan moist forests (Brazil, French Guiana, Guyana, Suriname, Venezuela)
- Guianan piedmont and lowland moist forests (Brazil, Venezuela)
- Gurupa várzea (Brazil)
- Iquitos várzea (Bolivia, Brazil, Peru)
- Japurá–Solimões–Negro moist forests (Brazil, Colombia, Venezuela)
- Juruá–Purus moist forests (Brazil)
- Madeira–Tapajós moist forests (Bolivia, Brazil)
- Marajó várzea (Brazil)
- Maranhão Babaçu forests (Brazil)
- Mato Grosso tropical dry forests (Brazil)
- Monte Alegre várzea (Brazil)
- Napo moist forests (Colombia, Ecuador, Peru)
- Negro–Branco moist forests (Brazil, Colombia, Venezuela)
- Paramaribo swamp forests (Guyana, Suriname)
- Purus várzea (Brazil)
- Purus–Madeira moist forests (Brazil)
- Rio Negro campinarana (Brazil, Colombia)
- Solimões–Japurá moist forests (Brazil, Colombia, Peru)
- Southwest Amazon moist forests (Bolivia, Brazil, Peru)
- Tapajós–Xingu moist forests (Brazil)
- Tocantins–Araguaia–Maranhão moist forests (Brazil)
- Uatuma–Trombetas moist forests (Brazil, Guyana, Suriname)
- Ucayali moist forests (Peru)
- Xingu–Tocantins–Araguaia moist forests (Brazil)

=== Tropical and subtropical dry broadleaf forests ===
- Chiquitano dry forests (Bolivia, Brazil)

=== Tropical and subtropical grasslands, savannas, and shrublands ===
- Beni savanna (Bolivia Brazil, Peru)
- Guianan savanna (Brazil, Guyana, Venezuela)

== Caribbean bioregion ==
=== Tropical and subtropical moist broadleaf forests ===
- Cuban moist forests (Cuba)
- Hispaniolan moist forests (Dominican Republic, Haiti)
- Jamaican moist forests (Jamaica)
- Leeward Islands moist forests (Antigua, British Virgin Islands, Guadeloupe, Montserrat, Nevis, Saint Kitts)
- Puerto Rican moist forests (Puerto Rico)
- Windward Islands moist forests (Dominica, Grenada, Martinique, Saint Lucia, Saint Vincent and the Grenadines)

=== Tropical and subtropical dry broadleaf forests ===
- Bahamian dry forests (The Bahamas, Turks and Caicos Islands)
- Cayman Islands dry forests (Cayman Islands)
- Cuban dry forests (Cuba)
- Hispaniolan dry forests (Dominican Republic, Haiti)
- Jamaican dry forests (Jamaica)
- Lesser Antillean dry forests (Anguilla, Antigua and Barbuda, Grenada, Martinique, Montserrat, Netherlands Antilles, Saint Lucia, Saint Vincent and the Grenadines)
- Puerto Rican dry forests (Puerto Rico)

=== Tropical and subtropical coniferous forests ===
- Bahamian pineyards (The Bahamas, Turks and Caicos Islands)
- Cuban pine forests (Cuba)
- Hispaniolan pine forests (Dominican Republic, Haiti)

=== Flooded grasslands and savannas ===
- Cuban wetlands (Cuba)
- Enriquillo wetlands (Dominican Republic, Haiti)

=== Deserts and xeric shrublands ===
- Cayman Islands xeric scrub (Cayman Islands)
- Cuban cactus scrub (Cuba)
- Leeward Islands xeric scrub (Anguilla, Antigua and Barbuda, British Virgin Islands, Guadeloupe, Saint Martin, Saint Barthelemy, Saba, US Virgin Islands)
- Windward Islands xeric scrub (Barbados, Dominica, Grenada, Martinique, Saint Lucia, Saint Vincent and the Grenadines)

== Central America bioregion ==
=== Tropical and subtropical moist broadleaf forests ===
- Cocos Island moist forests (Costa Rica)
- Costa Rican seasonal moist forests (Costa Rica, Nicaragua)
- Isthmian–Atlantic moist forests (Costa Rica, Nicaragua, Panama)
- Isthmian–Pacific moist forests (Costa Rica, Panama)
- Oaxacan montane forests (Mexico)
- Pantanos de Centla (Mexico)
- Petén–Veracruz moist forests (Mexico)
- Sierra de los Tuxtlas (Mexico)
- Sierra Madre de Chiapas moist forests (El Salvador, Guatemala, Mexico)
- Talamancan montane forests (Costa Rica, Panama)
- Veracruz moist forests (Mexico)
- Veracruz montane forests (Mexico)
- Yucatán moist forests (Belize, Guatemala, Mexico)

=== Tropical and subtropical dry broadleaf forests ===
- Bajío dry forests (Mexico)
- Balsas dry forests (Mexico)
- Central American dry forests (Costa Rica, El Salvador, Guatemala, Honduras, Mexico, Nicaragua)
- Chiapas Depression dry forests (Guatemala, Mexico)
- Jalisco dry forests (Mexico)
- Panamanian dry forests (Panama)
- Revillagigedo Islands dry forests (Mexico)
- Sierra de la Laguna dry forests (Mexico)
- Sinaloan dry forests (Mexico)
- Southern Pacific dry forests (Mexico)
- Veracruz dry forests (Mexico)
- Yucatán dry forests (Mexico)

=== Tropical and subtropical coniferous forests ===
- Belizian pine forests (Belize)
- Central American pine–oak forests (El Salvador, Guatemala, Honduras, Mexico, Nicaragua)
- Miskito pine forests (Honduras, Nicaragua)
- Sierra de la Laguna pine–oak forests (Mexico)
- Sierra Madre de Oaxaca pine–oak forests (Mexico)
- Sierra Madre del Sur pine–oak forests (Mexico)
- Trans-Mexican Volcanic Belt pine–oak forests (Mexico)

=== Flooded grasslands and savannas ===
- Central Mexican wetlands (Mexico)

=== Montane grasslands and shrublands ===
- Talamancan páramo (Costa Rica, Panama)
- Zacatonal (Mexico)

=== Deserts and xeric shrublands ===
- Motagua Valley thornscrub (Guatemala)
- San Lucan xeric scrub (Mexico)
- Tehuacán Valley matorral (Mexico)

== Central Andes ==
=== Tropical and subtropical moist broadleaf forests ===
- Bolivian Yungas (Bolivia, Peru)
- Peruvian Yungas (Peru)
- Southern Andean Yungas (Argentina, Bolivia)

=== Tropical and subtropical dry broadleaf forests ===
- Bolivian montane dry forests (Bolivia)

=== Montane grasslands and shrublands ===
- Central Andean dry puna (Argentina, Bolivia, Chile)
- Central Andean puna (Argentina, Bolivia, Peru)
- Central Andean wet puna (Bolivia, Peru)
- Cordillera Central páramo (Ecuador, Peru)

=== Mediterranean forests, woodlands, and scrub ===
- Chilean Matorral (Chile)

=== Deserts and xeric shrublands ===
- Atacama Desert (Chile, Peru)
- Sechura Desert (Peru)

== Eastern South America ==
=== Tropical and subtropical moist broadleaf forests ===
- Alto Paraná Atlantic forests (Argentina, Brazil, Paraguay)
- Araucaria moist forests (Argentina, Brazil)
- Atlantic Coast restingas (Brazil)
- Bahia coastal forests (Brazil)
- Bahia interior forests (Brazil)
- Caatinga enclaves moist forests (Brazil)
- Fernando de Noronha-Atol das Rocas moist forests (Brazil)
- Northeastern Brazil restingas (Brazil)
- Pernambuco coastal forests (Brazil)
- Pernambuco interior forests (Brazil)
- Serra do Mar coastal forests (Brazil)
- Trindade-Martin Vaz Islands tropical forests (Brazil)

=== Tropical and subtropical dry broadleaf forests ===
- Atlantic dry forests (Brazil)
- Dry Chaco (Argentina, Bolivia, Paraguay)

=== Flooded grasslands and savannas ===
- Pantanal (Bolivia, Brazil, Paraguay)
- Paraná flooded savanna (Argentina)
- Southern Cone Mesopotamian savanna (Argentina)

=== Tropical and subtropical grasslands, savannas, and shrublands ===
- Campos rupestres (Brazil)
- Cerrado (Bolivia, Brazil, Paraguay)
- Humid Chaco (Argentina, Brazil, Paraguay)

=== Deserts and xeric shrublands ===
- Caatinga (Brazil)
- Saint Peter and Saint Paul rocks (Brazil)

== Northern Andes ==
=== Tropical and subtropical moist broadleaf forests ===
- Catatumbo moist forests (Venezuela)
- Cauca Valley montane forests (Colombia)
- Chocó–Darién moist forests (Colombia, Ecuador, Panama)
- Cordillera Oriental montane forests (Colombia, Venezuela)
- Eastern Panamanian montane forests (Colombia, Panama)
- Eastern Cordillera Real montane forests (Colombia, Ecuador, Peru)
- Magdalena Valley montane forests (Colombia)
- Magdalena–Urabá moist forests (Colombia)
- Northwestern Andean montane forests (Colombia, Ecuador)
- Santa Marta montane forests (Colombia)
- Cordillera de la Costa montane forests (Colombia, Venezuela)
- Western Ecuador moist forests (Colombia, Ecuador)

=== Tropical and subtropical dry broadleaf forests ===
- Apure–Villavicencio dry forests (Venezuela)
- Cauca Valley dry forests (Colombia)
- Ecuadorian dry forests (Ecuador)
- Lara–Falcón dry forests (Venezuela)
- Magdalena Valley dry forests (Colombia)
- Maracaibo dry forests (Venezuela)
- Marañón dry forests (Peru)
- Patía Valley dry forests (Colombia)
- Sinú Valley dry forests (Colombia)
- Tumbes–Piura dry forests (Colombia, Ecuador, Peru)

=== Flooded grasslands and savannas ===
- Guayaquil flooded grasslands (Ecuador)

=== Montane grasslands and shrublands ===
- Cordillera de Mérida páramo (Venezuela)
- Northern Andean páramo (Colombia, Ecuador)
- Santa Marta páramo (Colombia)

=== Deserts and xeric shrublands ===
- Guajira–Barranquilla xeric scrub (Colombia, Venezuela)
- Malpelo Island xeric scrub (Colombia)
- Paraguana xeric scrub (Venezuela)
- Aruba–Curaçao–Bonaire cactus scrub (Aruba, Bonaire, Curaçao)

== Orinoco bioregion ==
=== Tropical and subtropical moist broadleaf forests ===
- Cordillera La Costa montane forests (Venezuela)
- Guayanan Highlands moist forests (Brazil, Colombia, Guyana, Suriname, Venezuela)
- Orinoco Delta swamp forests (Guyana, Venezuela)
- Tepuis (Brazil, Guyana, Suriname, Venezuela)
- Trinidad and Tobago moist forests (Trinidad and Tobago)

=== Tropical and subtropical dry broadleaf forests ===
- Trinidad and Tobago dry forests (Trinidad and Tobago)

=== Tropical and subtropical grasslands, savannas, and shrublands ===
- Llanos (Colombia, Venezuela)

=== Flooded grasslands and savannas ===
- Orinoco wetlands (Venezuela)

=== Deserts and xeric shrublands ===
- Araya and Paria xeric scrub (Venezuela)
- La Costa xeric shrublands (Venezuela)

== Southern South America ==
=== Temperate broadleaf and mixed forests ===
- Juan Fernández Islands temperate forests (Chile)
- Magellanic subpolar forests (Argentina, Chile)
- San Felix-San Ambrosio Islands temperate forests (Desventuradas Islands) (Chile)
- Valdivian temperate rain forests (Argentina, Chile)

=== Tropical and subtropical grasslands, savannas, and shrublands ===
- Uruguayan savanna (Argentina, Brazil, Uruguay)

=== Temperate grasslands, savannas, and shrublands ===
- Argentine Espinal (Argentina)
- Argentine Monte (Argentina)
- Humid Pampa (Argentina)
- Patagonian grasslands (Argentina, Chile)
- Patagonian steppe (Argentina, Chile)
- Semi-arid Pampa (Argentina)

== South Florida ==
=== Tropical and subtropical moist broadleaf forests ===
- South Florida rocklands (United States)

=== Flooded grasslands and savannas ===
- Everglades (United States)

== Mangrove ==
=== Tropical Atlantic ===
==== Gulf of Mexico ====
- Alvarado mangroves (Mexico)
- Usumacinta mangroves (Mexico)

==== Yucatán Peninsula ====
- Belizean Coast mangroves (Belize)
- Belizean Reef mangroves (Belize)
- Petenes mangroves (Mexico)
- Ría Lagartos mangroves (Mexico)
- Mayan Corridor mangroves (Mexico)

==== Atlantic Central America ====
- Bocas del Toro–San Bastimentos Island–San Blas mangroves (Costa Rica, Panama)
- Mosquitia–Nicaraguan Caribbean Coast mangroves (Costa Rica, Honduras, Nicaragua)
- Northern Honduras mangroves (Guatemala, Honduras)
- Rio Negro–Rio San Sun mangroves (Costa Rica, Nicaragua)

==== West Indies ====
- Bahamian mangroves (Bahamas, Turks and Caicos Islands)
- Greater Antilles mangroves (Cuba, Dominican Republic, Haiti, Jamaica, Puerto Rico)
- Lesser Antilles mangroves (Lesser Antilles)

==== Continental Caribbean ====
- Coastal Venezuelan mangroves (Venezuela)
- Magdalena–Santa Marta mangroves (Colombia)

==== Amazon-Orinoco-Maranhao ====
- Amapá mangroves (Brazil)
- Guianan mangroves (French Guiana, Guyana, Suriname, Venezuela)
- Ilha Grande mangroves (Brazil)
- Maranhão mangroves (Brazil)
- Pará mangroves (Brazil)
- Rio Piranhas mangroves (Brazil)
- Trinidad mangroves (Trinidad and Tobago)

==== Northeast Brazil ====
- Bahia mangroves (Brazil)
- Rio Piranhas mangroves (Brazil)
- Rio São Francisco mangroves (Brazil)

==== Southeast Brazil ====
- Ilha Grande mangroves (Brazil)

=== Tropical Eastern Pacific ===
==== Sea of Cortez ====
- Marismas Nacionales–San Blas mangroves (Mexico)

==== Southern Mexico ====
- Mexican South Pacific Coast mangroves (Mexico)

==== Pacific Central America ====
- Gulf of Fonseca mangroves (El Salvador, Honduras, Nicaragua)
- Moist Pacific Coast mangroves (Costa Rica, Panama)
- Northern Dry Pacific Coast mangroves (El Salvador, Guatemala)
- Southern Dry Pacific Coast mangroves (Costa Rica, Nicaragua)
- Tehuantepec–El Manchón mangroves (Mexico)

==== Pacific South America ====
- Esmeraldas–Pacific Colombia mangroves (Colombia, Ecuador)
- Gulf of Guayaquil–Tumbes mangroves (Ecuador, Peru)
- Gulf of Panama mangroves (Panama)
- Manabí mangroves (Ecuador)
- Piura mangroves (Peru)

==== Galápagos Islands ====
- Galápagos mangroves (Ecuador)

== See also ==
- Caribbean bioregion
