= Caribbean bioregion =

Terrestrial biogeographic region encompassing the Caribbean islands

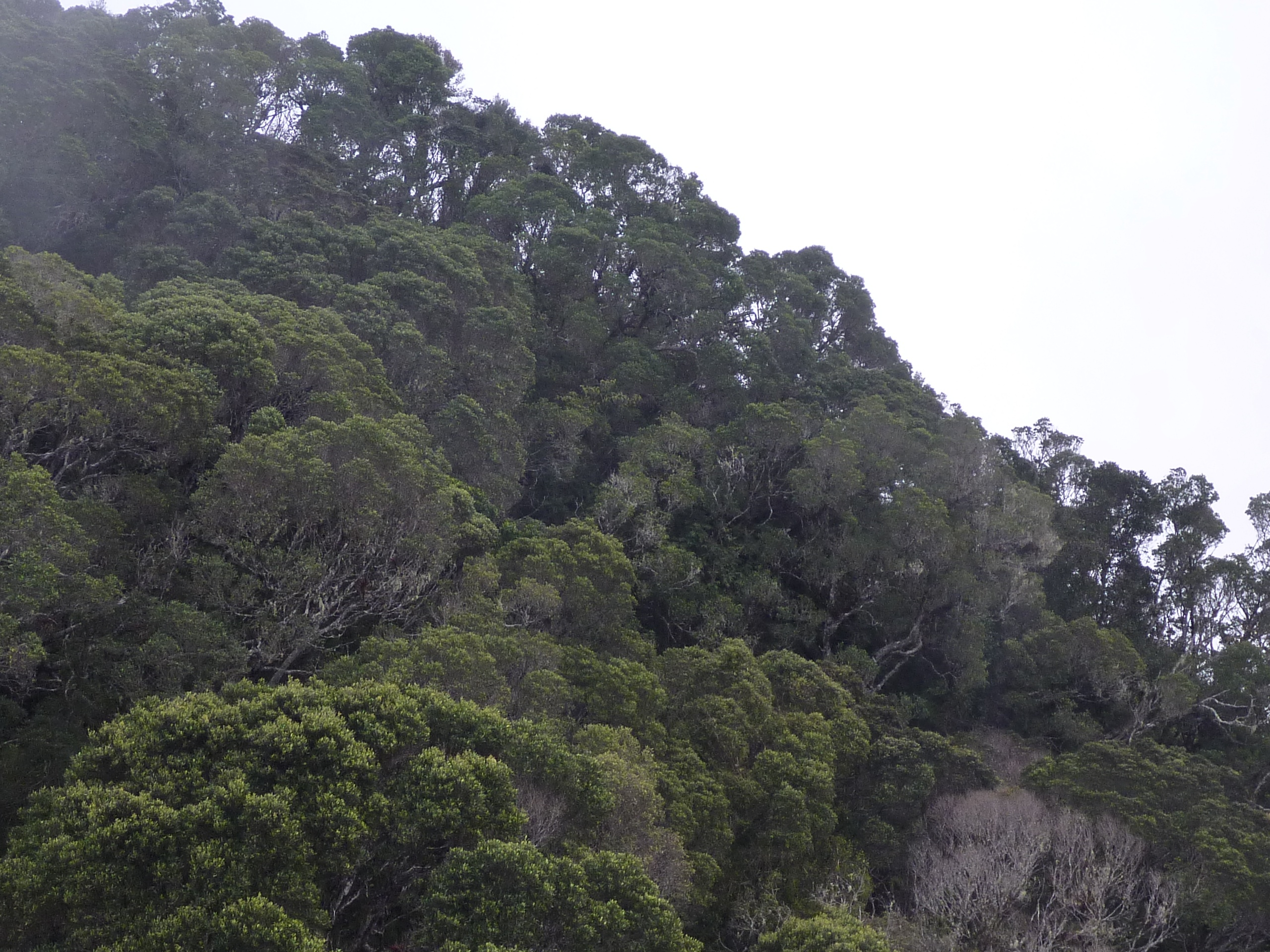
Montane moist forest on the slopes of Pico Turquino, Santiago de Cuba, Cuba

The Caribbean bioregion is a biogeographic region that includes the islands of the Caribbean Sea, Southern Florida in the United States and nearby Atlantic islands, which share a fauna, flora and mycobiota distinct from surrounding bioregions.

== Geography ==
The Caribbean bioregion, as described by the World Wildlife Fund, includes the Greater Antilles (Cuba, Hispaniola, Puerto Rico, and Jamaica), the Lesser Antilles, the Lucayan archipelago (Bahamas and Turks and Caicos Islands), Southern Florida in the United States. The Lucayan archipelago lies north of the Caribbean in the Atlantic Ocean, but is part of the bioregion based on its flora and fauna. The bioregion does not include the coastal islands of South America, these islands are part of South America's continental shelf. Aruba and Trinidad and Tobago have been historically part of the South American continent. Aruba, Bonaire, Curacao, and Trinidad and Tobago are part of the Orinoco bioregion.

The climate of the ecoregion is tropical, and varies from humid to arid. Geology and topography also vary, with larger mountainous islands of continental rock, volcanic islands, and low-lying coral and limestone islands. The bioregion includes tropical moist forests, tropical dry forests, tropical pine forests, flooded grasslands and savannas, xeric shrublands, and mangroves.

== Flora and fauna ==
The Caribbean bioregion's distinct fauna, flora and mycobiota was shaped by long periods of physical separation from the neighboring continents, allowing animals, fungi and plants to evolve in isolation. Other animals, fungi and plants arrived via long-distance oceanic dispersal or island hopping from North America and South America.

The bioregion has many plant species, including many endemics. There are about 200 endemic genera of plants. Wallenia, the largest endemic genus, has thirty species, and six other genera have ten or more species.

Three mammal families are endemic to the bioregion; the Solenodontidae includes two species of solenodon, with one species on Cuba and the other on Hispaniola. Fossil evidence shows that the family was once more widespread in North America. The family Nesophontidae, or the West Indian shrews, contained a single genus, Nesophontes, which inhabited Cuba, Hispaniola, Puerto Rico and the Cayman Islands. All members of the family are now believed to be extinct. The Capromyidae, or hutias, include a number of species, mainly from the Greater Antilles and the Lucayan Archipelago. Many other rodents of the Caribbean are also restricted to the region.

== Ecoregions ==
=== Tropical and subtropical moist broadleaf forests ===
- Cuban moist forests (Cuba)
- Hispaniolan moist forests (Dominican Republic, Haiti)
- Jamaican moist forests (Jamaica)
- Leeward Islands moist forests (Antigua, British Virgin Islands, Guadeloupe, Montserrat, Nevis, Saint Kitts, US Virgin Islands)
- Puerto Rican moist forests (Puerto Rico)
- South Florida rocklands (Florida)
- Tropical hardwood hammock (Florida)
- Windward Islands moist forests (Dominica, Grenada, Martinique, Saint Lucia, Saint Vincent and the Grenadines)

=== Tropical and subtropical dry broadleaf forests ===
- Bahamian dry forests (Bahamas)
- Cayman Islands dry forests (Cayman Islands)
- Cuban dry forests (Cuba)
- Hispaniolan dry forests (Dominican Republic, Haiti)
- Jamaican dry forests (Jamaica)
- Lesser Antillean dry forests (Anguilla, Antigua and Barbuda, Grenada, Martinique, Montserrat, Netherlands Antilles, Saint Lucia, Saint Vincent and the Grenadines)
- Puerto Rican dry forests (Puerto Rico)

=== Tropical and subtropical coniferous forests ===
- Bahamian pineyards (The Bahamas)
- Cuban pine forests (Cuba)
- Hispaniolan pine forests (Dominican Republic, Haiti)
- South Florida pine flatwoods (Florida)

=== Tropical and subtropical grasslands, savannas, and shrublands ===
- Florida dry prairie (Florida)
- Florida scrub (Florida)

=== Flooded grasslands and savannas ===
- Cuban wetlands (Cuba)
- Enriquillo wetlands (Dominican Republic, Haiti)
- Everglades (Florida)

=== Deserts and xeric shrublands ===
- Cayman Islands xeric scrub (Cayman Islands)
- Cuban cactus scrub (Cuba)
- Leeward Islands xeric scrub (Anguilla, Antigua and Barbuda, British Virgin Islands, Guadeloupe, Saint Martin, Saint Barthelemy, Saba, US Virgin Islands)
- Windward Islands xeric scrub (Barbados, Dominica, Grenada, Martinique, Saint Lucia, Saint Vincent and the Grenadines)

=== Mangrove ===
- Bahamian mangroves (Bahamas, Turks and Caicos Islands)
- Florida mangroves (Florida)
- Greater Antilles mangroves (Cuba, Dominican Republic, Haiti, Jamaica, Puerto Rico)
- Lesser Antilles mangroves (Lesser Antilles)

== See also ==
- List of Neotropical ecoregions by bioregion
