= List of ecoregions in the United Kingdom =

The following is a list of ecoregions in the United Kingdom as identified by the World Wide Fund for Nature (WWF).

== Terrestrial ==
=== Temperate broadleaf and mixed forests ===
- Celtic broadleaf forests
- English Lowlands beech forests
- North Atlantic moist mixed forests

=== Temperate coniferous forests ===
- Caledonian conifer forests

== Freshwater ==
- Central & Western Europe
- Northern British Isles

== Marine ==
- Celtic Seas
- North Sea

== Overseas Territories ==
- Tropical and subtropical dry broadleaf forests (Anguilla)
- Leeward Islands xeric scrub (Anguilla, British Virgin Islands)
- Bermuda subtropical conifer forests (Bermuda)
- Maldives–Lakshadweep–Chagos Archipelago tropical moist forests (British Indian Ocean Territory)
- Leeward Islands moist forests (British Virgin Islands, Montserrat)
- Cayman Islands dry forests (Cayman Islands)
- Cayman Islands xeric scrub (Cayman Islands)
- Patagonian steppe (Falkland Islands)
- Southwest Iberian Mediterranean sclerophyllous and mixed forests (Gibraltar)
- Lesser Antillean dry forests (Montserrat)
- Tuamotu tropical moist forests (Pitcairn Islands)
- Ascension scrub and grasslands (Saint Helena, Ascension and Tristan da Cunha)
- Saint Helena scrub and woodlands (Saint Helena, Ascension and Tristan da Cunha)
- Tristan da Cunha–Gough Islands shrub and grasslands (Saint Helena, Ascension and Tristan da Cunha)
- Scotia Sea Islands tundra (South Georgia and the South Sandwich Islands, contested part of British Antarctic Territory)
- Bahamian dry forests (Turks and Caicos Islands)
- Bahamian pine mosaic (Turks and Caicos Islands)
- Bahamian mangroves (Turks and Caicos Islands)
