= List of ecoregions in France =

The following is a list of ecoregions in France as identified by the World Wide Fund for Nature (WWF).

== Metropolitan France ==
Ecoregions of Metropolitan France: Cantabrian mixed forests (648) Atlantic mixed forests (664) Pyrenees conifer and mixed forests (676) Western European broadleaf forests (686) Alps conifer and mixed forests (689) Corsican montane broadleaf and mixed forests (788) Italian sclerophyllous and semi-deciduous forests (795) Northeastern Spain and Southern France Mediterranean forests (799) Tyrrhenian–Adriatic sclerophyllous and mixed forests (806)

The ecoregions of Metropolitan France are as follows:

=== Terrestrial ecoregions ===
Terrestrial ecoregions of Metropolitan France are listed by biome. All them are in the Palearctic realm.

==== Temperate broadleaf and mixed forests ====
- Atlantic mixed forests
- Cantabrian mixed forests
- Pyrenees conifer and mixed forests
- Western European broadleaf forests

==== Temperate coniferous forests ====
- Alps conifer and mixed forests

==== Mediterranean forests, woodlands, and scrub ====
- Corsican montane broadleaf and mixed forests (Corsica)
- Northeastern Spain and Southern France Mediterranean forests
- Italian sclerophyllous and semi-deciduous forests
- Tyrrhenian–Adriatic sclerophyllous and mixed forests (Corsica)

=== Freshwater ecoregions ===
- Cantabric Coast - Languedoc
- Central & Western Europe
- Italian Peninsula & Islands (Corsica)

=== Marine ecoregions ===
Marine ecoregions of France are listed by marine province. All of them are in the Temperate Northern Atlantic realm.

==== Northern European Seas province ====
- Celtic Seas
- North Sea

==== Lusitanian province ====
- South European Atlantic Shelf

==== Mediterranean Sea province ====
- Western Mediterranean

== Overseas France ==
This is a list of all terrestrial ecoregions of France's overseas departments and territories.

=== Nearctic realm ===
==== Boreal forests/taiga ====
- South Avalon-Burin oceanic barrens (Saint Pierre and Miquelon)

=== Neotropical realm ===
==== Deserts and xeric shrublands ====
- Leeward Islands xeric scrub (Guadeloupe, Saint Martin, Saint Barthelemy)
- Windward Islands xeric scrub (Martinique)

==== Mangroves ====
- Guianan mangroves (French Guiana)
- Lesser Antilles mangroves (Guadeloupe, Martinique)

==== Tropical and subtropical dry broadleaf forests ====
- Lesser Antillean dry forests (Martinique)

==== Tropical and subtropical moist broadleaf forests ====
- Guianan moist forests (French Guiana)
- Leeward Islands moist forests (Guadeloupe)
- Windward Islands moist forests (Martinique)

=== Afrotropical realm ===
==== Deserts and xeric shrublands ====
- Ile Europa and Bassas da India xeric scrub (Bassas da India, Europa Island)

==== Temperate grasslands and shrublands ====
- Amsterdam and Saint-Paul Islands temperate grasslands (Île Amsterdam, Île Saint-Paul)

==== Tropical and subtropical moist broadleaf forests ====
- Comoros forests (Mayotte)
- Mascarene forests (Réunion)

=== Australasian realm ===
==== Tropical and subtropical moist broadleaf forests ====
- New Caledonia rain forests (New Caledonia)

==== Tropical and subtropical dry broadleaf forests ====
- New Caledonia dry forests (New Caledonia)

=== Oceanian realm ===
==== Tropical and subtropical moist broadleaf forests ====
- Fiji tropical moist forests (Wallis and Futuna)
- Marquesas tropical moist forests (French Polynesia)
- Society Islands tropical moist forests (French Polynesia)
- Tuamotu tropical moist forests (French Polynesia)
- Tubuai tropical moist forests (French Polynesia)

=== Antarctic realm ===
- Southern Indian Ocean Islands tundra (Crozet Islands, Kerguelen Islands)
