= List of desert and xeric shrubland ecoregions =

The World Wide Fund for Nature defines a number of ecoregions that belong the deserts and xeric shrublands biome:

== List of ecoregions ==
Afrotropical deserts and xeric shrublands ecoregions
| Arabian Peninsula coastal fog desert | Oman, Saudi Arabia, Yemen |
| Aldabra Island xeric scrub | Seychelles |
| East Saharan montane xeric woodlands | Chad, Sudan |
| Eritrean coastal desert | Djibouti, Eritrea |
| Ethiopian xeric grasslands and shrublands | Djibouti, Eritrea, Ethiopia, Somalia, Sudan |
| Gulf of Oman desert and semi-desert | Oman, United Arab Emirates |
| Hobyo grasslands and shrublands | Somalia |
| Ile Europa and Bassas da India xeric scrub | Bassas da India, Europa |
| Kalahari xeric savanna | Botswana, Namibia, South Africa |
| Kaokoveld desert | Angola, Namibia |
| Madagascar spiny thickets | Madagascar |
| Madagascar succulent woodlands | Madagascar |
| Masai xeric grasslands and shrublands | Ethiopia, Kenya |
| Nama Karoo | Namibia, South Africa |
| Namib desert | Namibia |
| Namibian savanna woodlands | Namibia |
| Socotra Island xeric shrublands | Yemen |
| Somali montane xeric woodlands | Somalia |
| Southwestern Arabian foothills savanna | Saudi Arabia, Yemen |
| Southwestern Arabian montane woodlands | Saudi Arabia, Yemen |
| Succulent Karoo | South Africa |

Australasian deserts and xeric shrublands ecoregions
| Carnarvon xeric shrublands | Australia |
| Central Ranges xeric scrub | Australia |
| Gibson Desert | Australia |
| Great Sandy-Tanami desert | Australia |
| Great Victoria Desert | Australia |
| Nullarbor Plain xeric shrublands | Australia |
| Pilbara shrublands | Australia |
| Simpson Desert | Australia |
| Tirari–Sturt stony desert | Australia |
| Western Australian mulga shrublands | Australia |

Indomalayan deserts and xeric shrublands ecoregions
| Deccan thorn scrub forests | India, Sri Lanka |
| Indus Valley Desert | India, Pakistan |
| Northwestern thorn scrub forests | India, Pakistan |
| Thar Desert | India, Pakistan |

Nearctic deserts and xeric shrublands ecoregions
| Baja California desert | Mexico |
| Central Mexican matorral | Mexico |
| Chihuahuan Desert | Mexico, United States |
| Colorado Plateau shrublands | United States |
| Columbia Plateau shrublands | Canada, United States |
| Great Basin shrub steppe | United States |
| Gulf of California xeric scrub | Mexico |
| Meseta Central matorral | Mexico |
| Mojave Desert | United States |
| Snake–Columbia shrub steppe | United States |
| Sonoran Desert | Mexico, United States |
| Tamaulipan matorral | Mexico |
| Tamaulipan mezquital | Mexico, United States |
| Wyoming Basin shrub steppe | United States |

Neotropical deserts and xeric shrublands ecoregions
| Araya and Paria xeric scrub | Venezuela |
| Aruba–Curaçao–Bonaire cactus scrub | Aruba, Bonaire, Curaçao |
| Atacama Desert | Chile, Peru |
| Caatinga | Brazil |
| Cayman Islands xeric scrub | Cayman Islands |
| Cuban cactus scrub | Cuba |
| Galápagos Islands xeric scrub | Ecuador |
| Guajira–Barranquilla xeric scrub | Colombia, Venezuela |
| La Costa xeric shrublands | Venezuela |
| Leeward Islands xeric scrub | Anguilla, Antigua and Barbuda, British Virgin Islands, Guadeloupe, Saint Martin, Saint Barthélemy, Saba, US Virgin Islands |
| Malpelo Island xeric scrub | Colombia |
| Motagua Valley thornscrub | Guatemala |
| Paraguana xeric scrub | Venezuela |
| San Lucan xeric scrub | Mexico |
| Sechura Desert | Peru |
| Tehuacán Valley matorral | Mexico |
| Windward Islands xeric scrub | Barbados, Dominica, Grenada, Martinique, Saint Lucia, Saint Vincent and the Grenadines |
| Saint Peter and Saint Paul Archipelago | Brazil |
