= Thorn forest =

Area with dense, scrublike vegetation

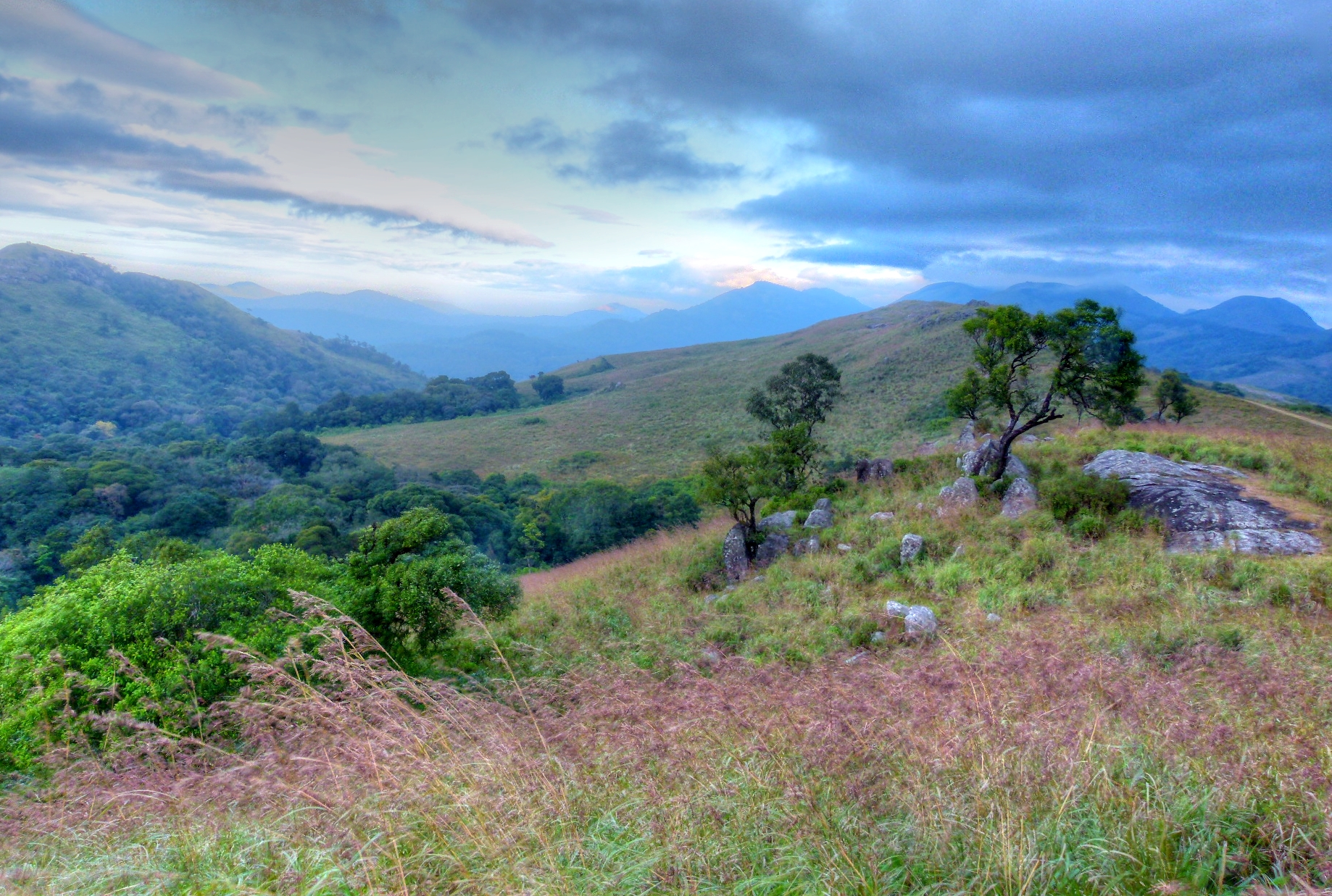
Jodigere Dry Forests, Karnataka, India

A thorn forest is a dense scrubland with vegetation characteristic of dry subtropical and warm temperate areas with monsoonal rainfall averaging 300 to 700 mm (12 to 28 in). The trees are often 6 to 10 m (20 to 33 ft), widely spaced, and have thick bark, small leaves, or spines to reduce water loss and protect themselves from grazing animals. Common plants include acacias, euphorbias, date palms and cacti (in the Americas). Thorn forests are generally transition zones between deserts and more fertile tropical/subtropical deciduous forests.

== Regions ==
=== Africa ===
present in the southwest of Africa with smaller areas in other places of Africa.

- Thornveld often referred to as "acacia thornveld"
- Madagascar spiny forests
- Madagascar succulent woodlands

=== North America ===
Thorn forests cover a large part of southwestern North America.

- Pinyon–juniper woodland in Utah and the Canyonlands region.
- Gulf of California xeric scrub
- Tamaulipan mezquital
- San Lucan xeric scrub

A relatively small band of thorn forest also exists in Central America around the Motagua Valley in Guatemala.

=== South America ===
In South America, the thorn forest is called Caatinga in northeastern Brazil, and consists primarily of small, thorny trees that shed their leaves seasonally. Trees typically do not exceed 10 metres (33 ft) in height, usually averaging between 7 and 8 metres (23 and 26 ft) tall.

Caatinga is considered a xeric shrubland and thorn forest, but contains the ecoregion Caatinga Enclaves moist forests that is considered Tropical and subtropical dry broadleaf forests.

There is also the Gran Chaco, which is a low-lying semi-arid thorn forest towards the south-central region of this continent spanning southeastern Bolivia, northwestern Paraguay, and northern Argentina.

=== Asia ===
- Deccan thorn scrub forests in India and Sri Lanka. Deccan is included in the Indomalayan biorealm, on the deserts and xeric shrublands biome.
- Northwestern thorn scrub forests in Northwest India and Pakistan, containing the fertile Punjab region.
- Baluchistan xeric woodlands

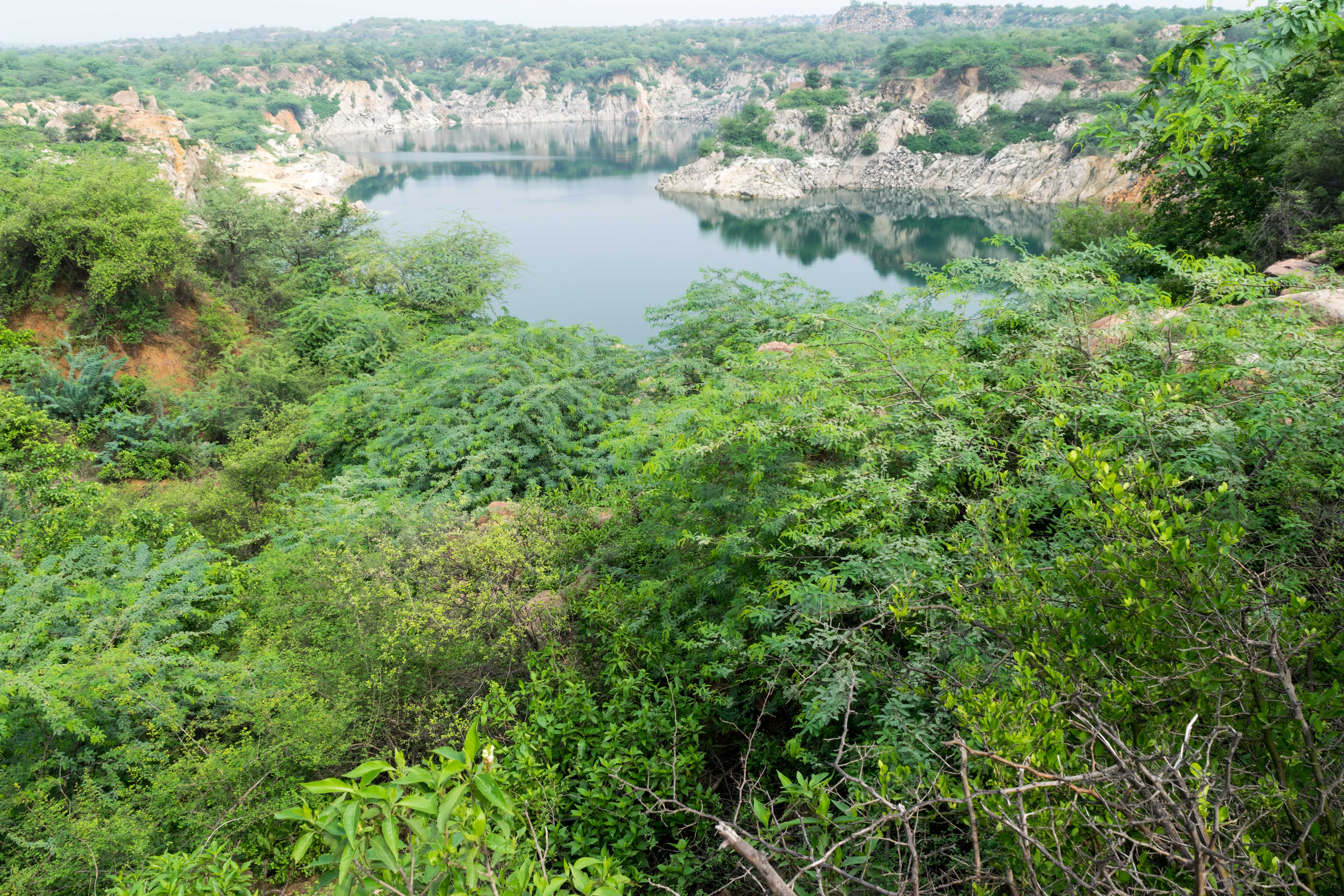
Thorn forest in Haryana, a state in northwestern India

=== Australia ===
- Mulga forests in Australia.

== Climate ==
This biome is primarily dominated by a hot steppe climate (Köppen BSh) with annual average rainfall of 300-700 mm, merging into subtropical monsoon climate (Köppen Cwa) and tropical savanna climate (Köppen Aw/As) on the wetter end and a hot desert climate on the drier end. This biome is primarily found in tropical and subtropical latitudes.

== Trees ==
The primary vegetation of this biome includes stunted trees and shrubs, rarely exceeding 10 metres (33 ft) in height. The dominant trees/shrubs found here are acacia, prosopis, euphorbia, mesquite, and cacti. These trees have roots which are spread wide underground to find nutrients in the soil, as there is less of it here.

== Transition ==
Thorn forests blend into savanna woodlands and seasonal tropical forest as the rainfall increases and into deserts as the climate becomes drier.

== See also ==
- Arid Forest Research Institute
- List of desert and xeric shrubland ecoregions
