= Lesser Antillean dry forests =

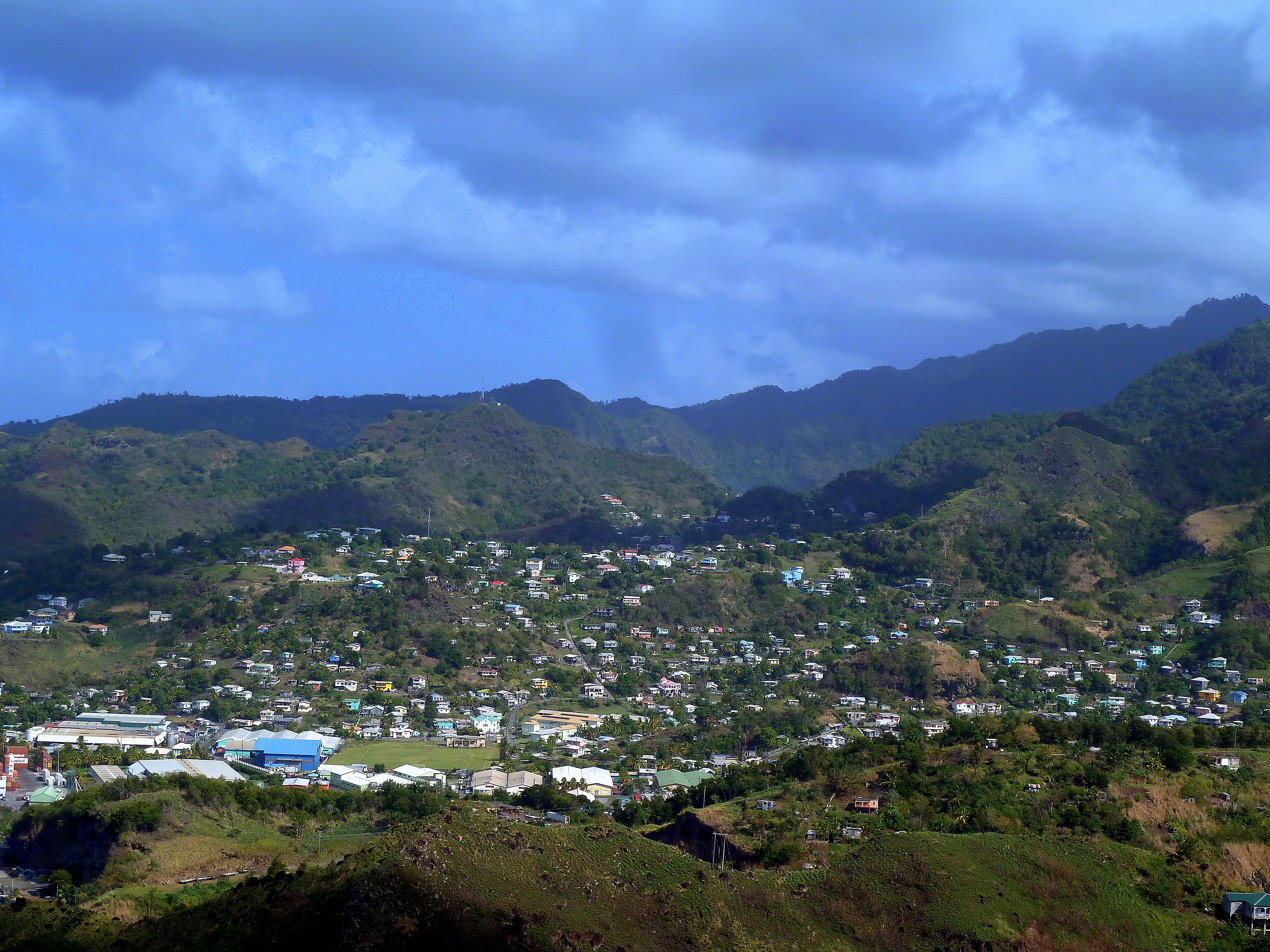
- View north from Fort Charlotte, Saint Vincent

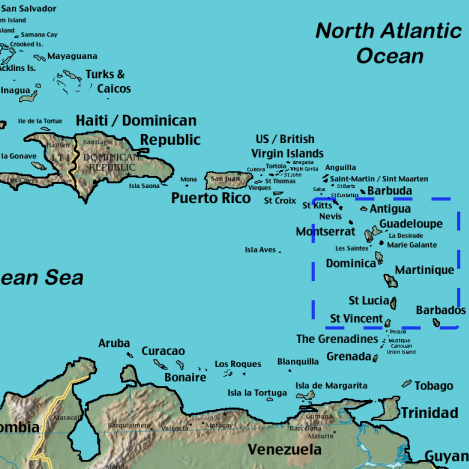
- Ecoregion territory (in blue dashed box)

Ecology
- Realm: Neotropic
- Biome: Tropical and subtropical moist broadleaf forests
- Borders: List: Windward Islands moist forests; Lesser Antilles mangroves; Leeward Islands moist forests; Windward Islands xeric scrub; Leeward Islands xeric scrub; Leeward Islands dry forests; Windward Islands dry forests

Geography
- Area: 130 km^{2} (50 sq mi)
- Country: Dominica, Martinique, Saint Lucia, Saint Vincent and the Grenadines, Grenada
- Coordinates: 13.834°N 61.062°W

The Lesser Antillean dry forests ecoregion (WWF ID: NT0220) covers the dry forests of the coastal lowlands of the Lesser Antilles, where the eastern Caribbean Sea meets the Atlantic Ocean. These forests generally form a band around the interior wet forests of higher elevations, and because they are often flat, they are under the most pressure for human settlement and agriculture.

== Location and description ==
The primary islands in this ecoregion with drye forests are Guadeloupe, Dominica, Martinique, Saint Lucia, Saint Vincent and the Grenadines, and Grenada. The islands are part of a volcanic arc; their interiors generally have mountainous highlands that catch more rainfall, and thus support moist forests of the Windward Islands moist forests ecoregion. The largest area of dry forests on the islands is on Saint Lucia, where the dry forests ring the coast to about 3 km into the interior, where higher elevations grade into moist forest. The same pattern holds on the island of Grenada. On the islands of Saint Vincent and Martinique, the dry forests occur in the thin transition band between the coastal dry shrubland and the upland moist forest.

== Climate ==
The climate of the ecoregion is Tropical rainforest climate (Köppen climate classification (Af)). This climate is characterized as hot, humid, and having at least 60 mm of precipitation every month. Precipitation is slightly higher than that of the coasts, which range from 1,000 mm/year on Dominica to 1,600 mm/year on St. Vincent.

== Flora and fauna ==
The dry forest ecoregion is 35% closed canopy, 20% open forest, 15% built-up urban area, 10% in agricultural use and the remainder in shrubs or open water. Characteristic tree species of the dry forest include those of genus Didymopanax and Miconia. Mosses and ferns are common. The soils are often disturbed by past agricultural use.
