= Greater Antilles mangroves =

Mangrove ecoregion in the Greater Antilles islands

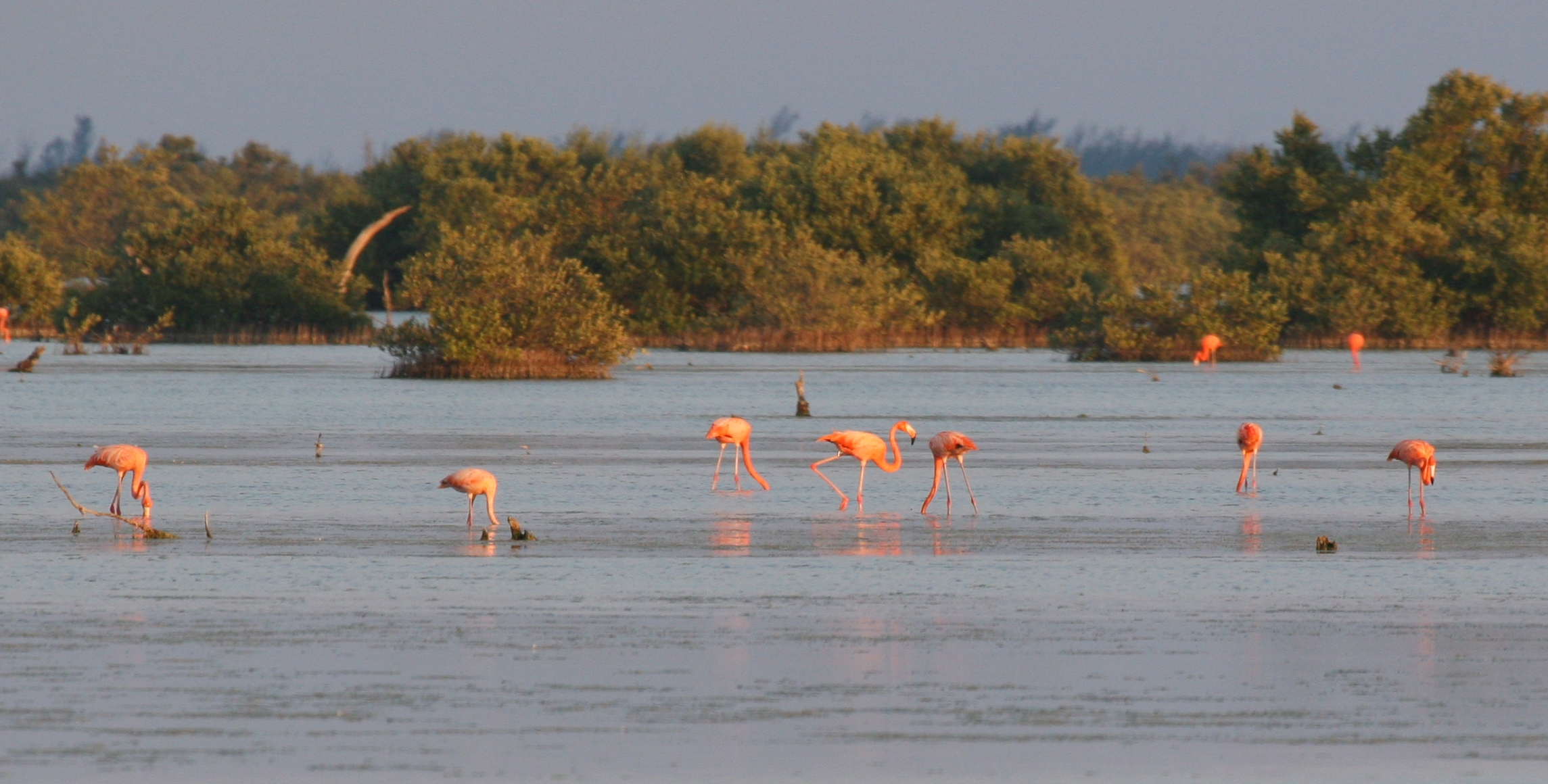
- American flamingos (Phoenicopterus ruber) feeding in a saltwater lagoon surrounded by a mangrove forest in Cuba.

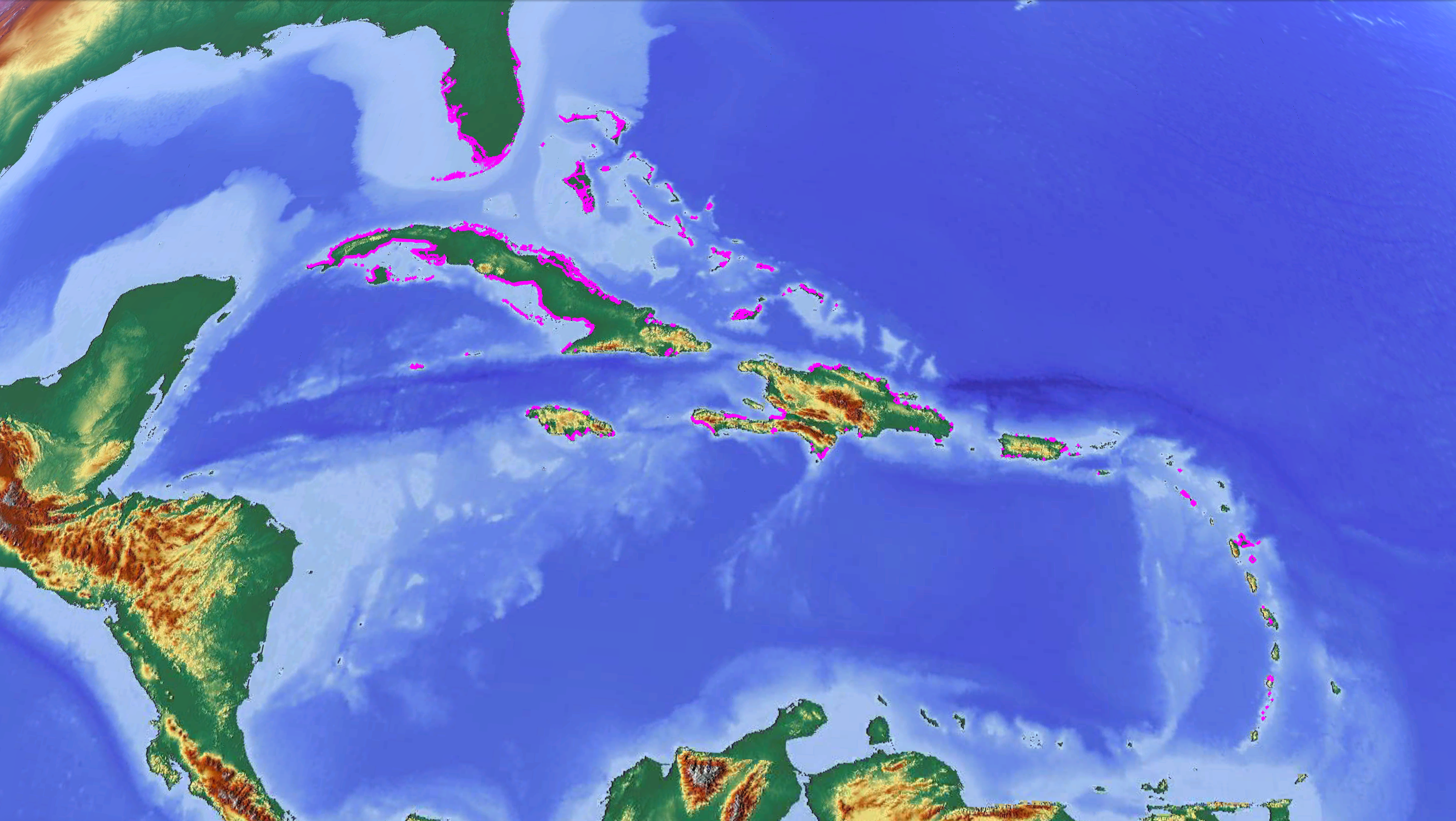
- Ecoregion territory (in magenta)

Ecology
- Realm: Neotropical
- Biome: mangroves
- Borders: List: Bahamian dry forests; Bahamian pineyards; Cayman Islands dry forests; Cuban cactus scrub; Cuban dry forests; Cuban moist forests; Cuban pine forests; Cuban wetlands; Hispaniolan dry forests; Hispaniolan moist forests; Jamaican dry forests; Jamaican moist forests; Puerto Rican dry forests; Puerto Rican moist forests

Geography
- Area: 10,600 km^{2} (4,100 mi^{2})
- Countries: List: Cuba; Dominican Republic; Haiti; Jamaica; United States (Puerto Rico)

Conservation
- Conservation status: Critical/endangered
- Protected: 30.5%(2007)

The Greater Antilles mangroves is a mangrove ecoregion that includes the coastal mangrove forests of the Greater Antilles – Cuba, Hispaniola, Jamaica, and Puerto Rico.

== Geography ==
Mangroves are estimated to cover 5,569 km^{2} in Cuba (or 4.8% of the country); 134 km^{2} in Haiti; 325 km^{2} in the Dominican Republic; and 106 km^{2} in Jamaica.

Some ecoregion systems include the Greater Antilles mangroves, Bahamian mangroves, and Lesser Antilles mangroves within a single Bahamian-Antillean mangroves ecoregion.

== Protected areas ==
30.5% of the ecoregion is in protected areas. These include the Zapata Swamp in Cuba, La Cahouane and Three Bays Protected Area in Haiti, Los Haitises National Park in the Dominican Republic, and the Piñones State Forest and Jobos Bay National Estuarine Research Reserve in Puerto Rico.
