= Celtic Seas =

Marine ecoregion of northwestern Europe

The Celtic Seas is a marine ecoregion in northwestern Europe. It extends from the northern coast of Brittany in northern France along the western coast of Great Britain to northern Scotland, and the seas around Ireland. It includes the Celtic Sea, western portion of the English Channel and the Channel Islands, the Irish Sea, and the Malin Sea.

The North Sea ecoregion lies to the east, and borders the Celtic Seas in the English Channel and Northern Scotland. The South European Atlantic Shelf ecoregion lies to the south, bordering the Celtic Seas in western Brittany.
