= Puerto Rican moist forests =

Ecoregion in Puerto Rico

Coordinates: 18.2°N 66.5°W

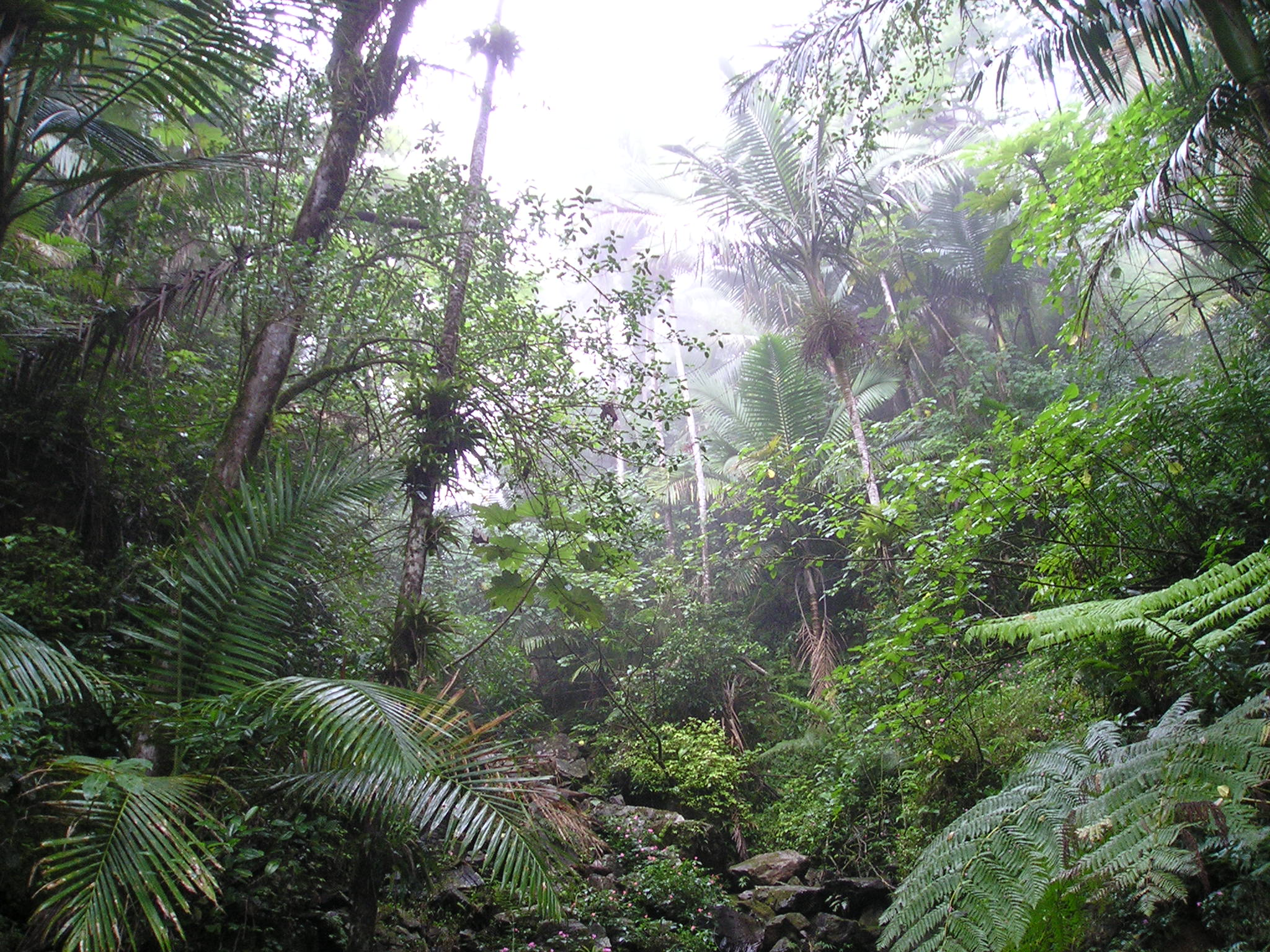
- El Yunque National Forest

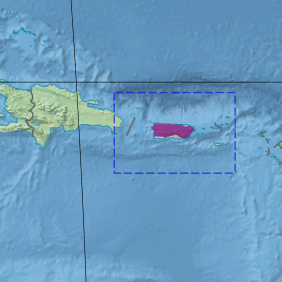
- Ecoregion territory (in purple)

Ecology
- Realm: Neotropical
- Biome: tropical and subtropical moist broadleaf forests
- Borders: Greater Antilles mangroves; Puerto Rican dry forests

Geography
- Area: 7,410 km^{2} (2,860 sq mi)
- Country: United States
- Commonwealth: Puerto Rico

Conservation
- Conservation status: Vulnerable
- Global 200: yes
- Protected: 406 km^{2} (5%)

The Puerto Rican moist forests are a tropical moist broadleaf forest ecoregion in Puerto Rico. They cover an area of 7,544 km^{2} (2,913 sq mi).

== Lowland forests ==
Lowland forests are found throughout the island's coastal lowlands except for the dry southwest. Characteristic tree species include Hymenaea courbaril, Palma de Coroso (Acrocomia media), Nectandra coriacea, and Zanthoxylum martinicense. Trees reach a height of 24 m (79 ft) in the northern portions, but are shorter elsewhere. Several species are adapted to dry periods by being deciduous or semi-deciduous.

== Montane forests ==
Montane forests cover the Sierra de Luquillo and the higher peaks of the Cordillera Central. Trees at middle elevations reach a height of 34 m (112 ft) and a diameter of 2.5 m (8.2 ft). Common trees of the Sierra de Luquillo include Cyathea arborea, Prestoea acuminata, Cecropia peltata, and Ocotea species. Weinmannia pinnata, Brunellia comocladifolia, and Podocarpus coriaceus are found in the cloud forests of the highest peaks.

== Fauna ==
Puerto Rican moist forests are home to a variety of endemic animal species such as the critically endangered Puerto Rican amazon (Amazona vittata) and coquís (Eleutherodactylus spp.). Limestone forests are rich in land snail diversity, with many species restricted to small areas.

== Ecological processes ==
As with most mountainous areas, the forest types change with elevation, exposure and rock type. Superimposed upon these physical factors are forms of natural disturbance such as landslides and hurricanes that allow light-demanding plant species to regenerate. A study in the Luqillo Mountains found that between 1936 and 1988, in the Upper Luquillo mountains of Puerto Rico there were 46 landslides associated with heavy rain, and these created gaps that allowed ferns such as Dicranopteris pectitnata to proliferate.

== Conservation and protected areas ==
A 2017 assessment found that 406 km^{2}, or 5%, of the ecoregion is in protected areas. Forty-two percent of the unprotected area is still forested. Protected areas include El Yunque National Forest, Cambalache Forest Reserve, Maricao State Forest, Monte Choca State Forest, Río Abajo State Forest, and Toro Negro State Forest. The Northeast Ecological Corridor Nature Reserve includes both lowland moist forest and dry forest.

== See also ==
- List of ecoregions in the United States (WWF)
