= Jamaican moist forests =

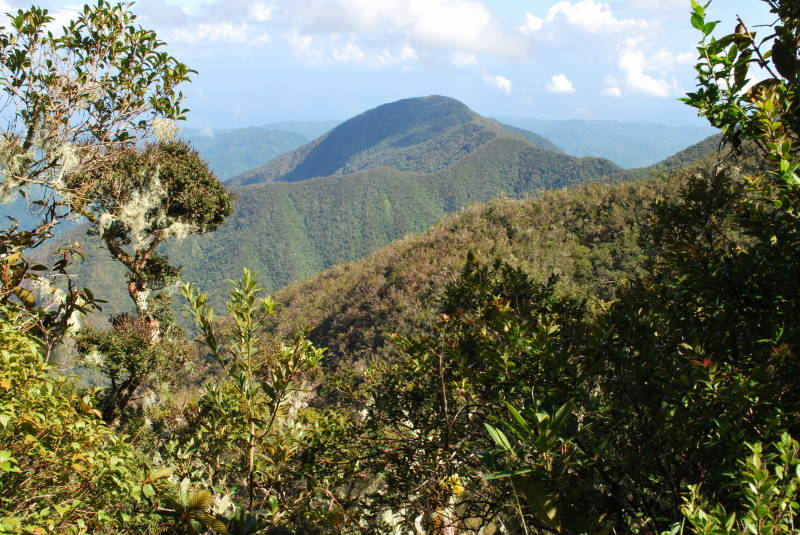
- Blue and John Crow Mountains National Park

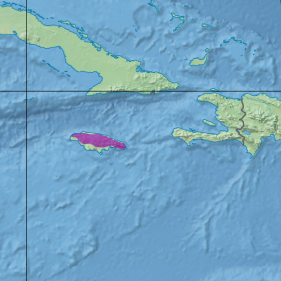
- Map of the ecoregion

Ecology
- Realm: Neotropical
- Biome: tropical and subtropical moist broadleaf forests
- Borders: Jamaican dry forests; Greater Antilles mangroves

Geography
- Area: 8,192 km^{2} (3,163 sq mi)
- Country: Jamaica

Conservation
- Conservation status: Critical/Endangered
- Global 200: Greater Antillean moist forests
- Protected: 1,131 km^{2} (14%)

The Jamaican moist forests is a tropical and subtropical moist broadleaf forests ecoregion in Jamaica.

== Geography ==
Jamaica is the third-largest island in the Caribbean, lying south of Cuba and west of Hispaniola. The Jamaican moist forests ecoregion covers an area of 8,192 km^{2}, and covers 85% of the island of Jamaica. It includes the Blue Mountains and John Crow Mountains in eastern Jamaica, and Cockpit Country further to the west. The highest peak on Jamaica is Blue Mountain Peak at 2,256 meters elevation.

Two-thirds of the island's land surface has a limestone substrate. The rest of the island is composed of igneous rocks, sedimentary shale, and alluvium. The John Crow Mountains are mostly limestone. In Blue Mountains the limestone has mostly eroded away, exposing shale, igneous, and metamorphic rocks. The island's central region, which covers most of the island, is covered in limestone. In the central Cockpit Country the limestone has eroded into a rugged karst landscape with sinkholes, hollows, and caves and caverns.

The separate Jamaican dry forests ecoregion covers the southern and northwestern coastal areas.

== Climate ==
The climate of the ecoregion is tropical, and ranges from subhumid to humid. Average annual rainfall varies from less than 750 mm to more than 7,000 mm. Rainfall generally increases with elevation. The island frequently experiences tropical cyclones between June and November.

== Flora ==
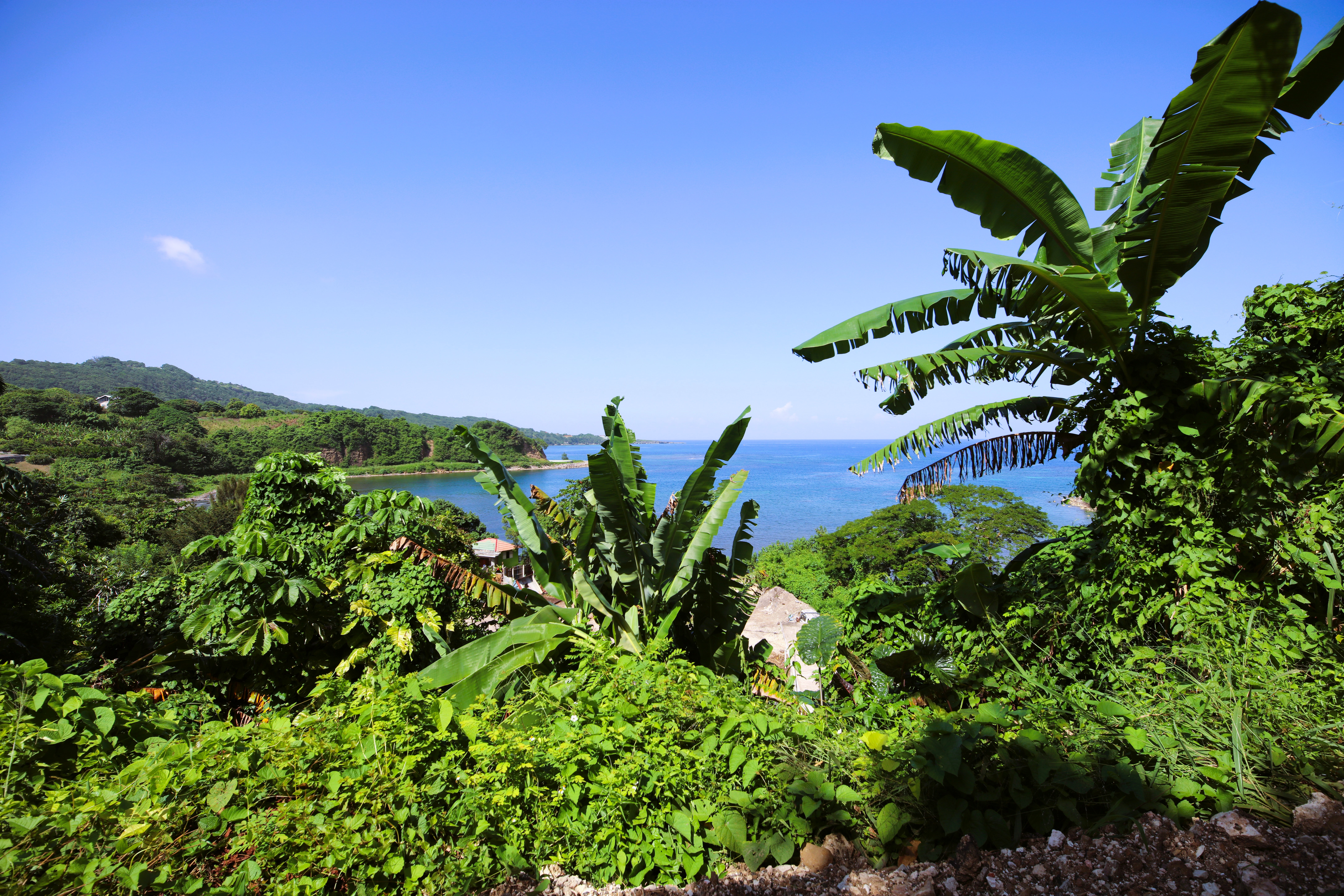
Banana tree and the coast

The forests of Jamaica vary with substrate, elevation, and rainfall. They are grouped into three broad groups – limestone forests, shale forests, and alluvial and wetland forests on the coastal plains. The forests are species-rich and diverse, containing over 1500 vascular plant species, of which about 400 are endemic to Jamaica. Centers of endemism include the Blue and John Crow Mountains, which have about 87 locally-endemic species, and Cockpit Country, with about 100 species of endemic flowering plants and one endemic fern.

Black River Lower Morass, located in the lower reaches of the Black River on the southwestern shore of the island, is Jamaica's largest wetland, and includes areas of open wetland, freshwater swamp forest, peatland, and coastal mangrove.

== Fauna ==
The ecoregion has 207 native species of birds. 28 species are endemic to Jamaica, the most endemic species of any Caribbean island. Jamaica has four endemic genera – Trochilus, Loxipasser, Euneornis, and Nesopsar. All of Jamaica's endemic species are native to the moist forests, and some also range into the dry forests. The black-billed streamertail (Trochilus scitulus) is limited to the eastern Blue and John Crow mountains.

Three widespread threatened species are found on Jamaica – the resident West Indian whistling duck (Dendrocygna arborea) and plain pigeon (Patagioenas inornata), and the piping plover (Charadrius melodus), a winter visitor. The Jamaican petrel (Pterodroma caribbaea) is a seabird that once bred in large numbers in the forests of the Blue and John Crow mountains. The petrels are thought extinct from predation by humans and introduced mongooses.

Jamaica's native terrestrial mammals are mostly bats, including the endemic Jamaican fig-eating bat (Ariteus flavescens) and Jamaican flower bat (Phyllonycteris aphylla). The endemic Jamaican serotine is considered a subspecies of big brown bat (Eptesicus fuscus lynni) or a separate species (Eptesicus lynni). The Jamaican fruit bat (Artibeus jamaicensis) is native to Jamaica along with the other Greater Antilles, Central America, and northwestern South America.

The only other terrestrial mammal is the Jamaican hutia (Geocapromys brownii), a rabbit-sized rodent endemic to Jamaica which mostly lives in the island's eastern, central and southern mountains. It is threatened by habitat loss and hunting.

The ecoregion is home to 62 species of lizards and snakes. The island has 27 endemic reptile species, and 20 endemic amphibian species.

Reptiles and amphibians endemic to the Jamaican moist forests include Sphaerodactylus richardsonii, Sphaerodactylus semasiops, Anolis garmani, Anolis reconditus, Eleutherodactylus grabhami, Eleutherodactylus griphus, Eleutherodactylus jamaicensis, Eleutherodactylus junori, Eleutherodactylus luteolus, Eleutherodactylus nubicola, Eleutherodactylus orcutti, Eleutherodactylus pantoni, and Eleutherodactylus sisyphodemus.

The forests are home to many insects, including the Jamaican endemic butterflies Eurytides marcellinus and the Jamaican swallowtail (Papilio homerus), the largest butterfly in the Americas.

Jamaica has 562 known species of terrestrial snails and slugs, of which 505, or 90%, are endemic. Most inhabit the moist forests. They include 24 species of Pleurodonte, and Annularia pulchrum. Many are threatened by deforestation and habitat loss, in particular tree snails of the genus Anoma.

== Conservation and threats ==
The ecoregion is threatened by forest clearance for agriculture and timber, hunting, and introduced species. The small Indian mongoose (Urva auropunctata) was introduced to Jamaica in 1872. It is an adaptable predator which has preyed heavily on native vertebrates, particularly the island's reptiles and amphibians.

== Protected areas ==
1,131 km^{2}, or 14%, of the ecoregion is in protected areas. Protected areas include Blue and John Crow Mountains National Park, Cockpit Country Forest Reserve, Litchfield-Matheson's Run Forest Reserve, and Stephney John's Vale Forest Reserve. Black River Lower Morass is designated a protected Ramsar wetland.
