= Aruba–Curaçao–Bonaire cactus scrub =

Ecoregion in the Caribbean

Aruba-Curaçao-Bonaire cactus scrub
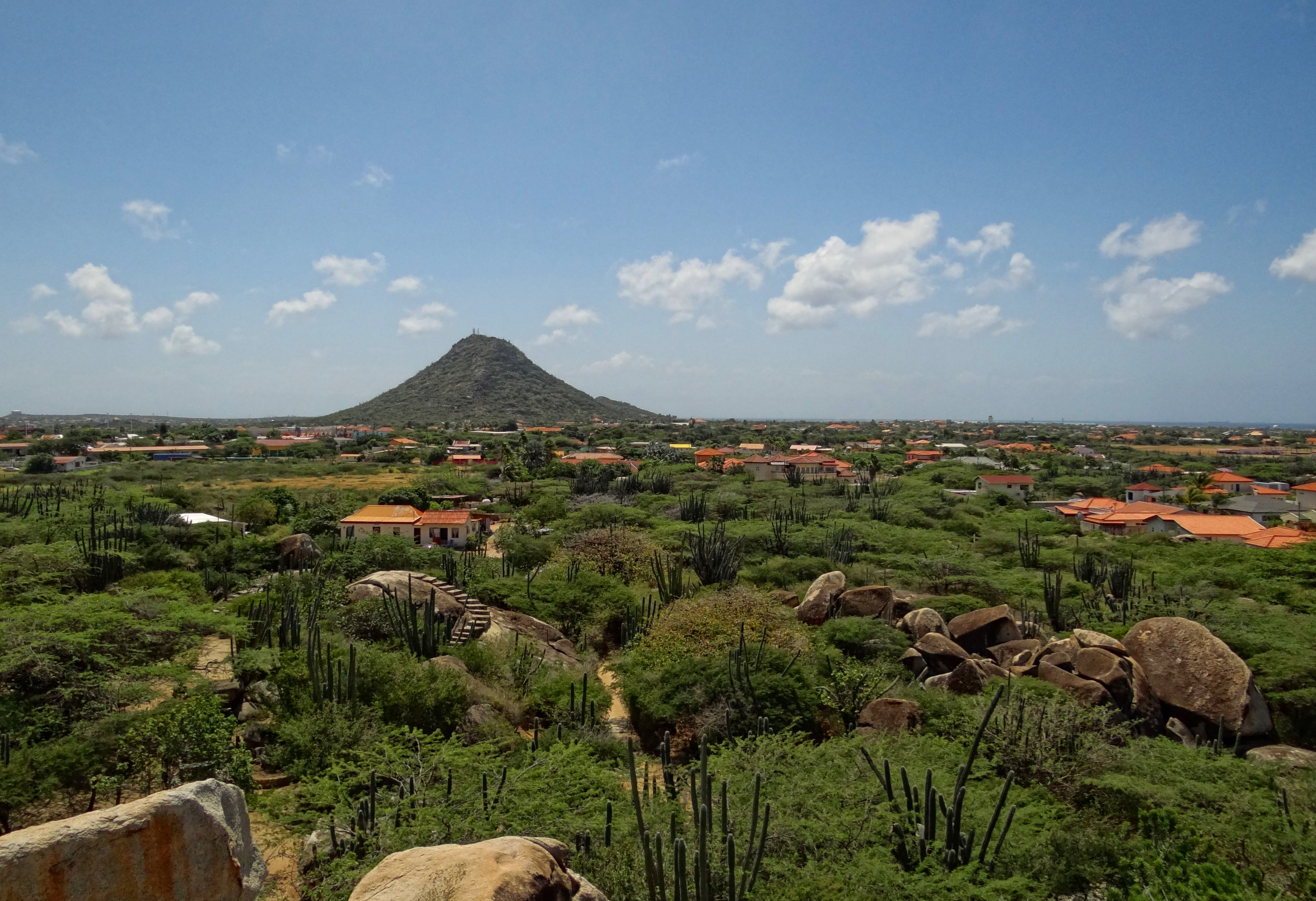
- Hooiberg Mountain on Aruba

- Ecoregion territory (islands in inset boxes)

Ecology
- Realm: Neotropic
- Biome: Deserts and xeric shrublands

Geography
- Area: 518 km^{2} (200 mi^{2})
- Country: Netherlands
- Coordinates: 12.137°N 68.893°W

The Aruba-Curaçao-Bonaire cactus scrub ecoregion (formerly WWF ID: NT1302) covers the dry land on the semi-arid islands of Aruba, Curaçao, and Bonaire in the southern Caribbean Sea, about 80 km from the mainland of Venezuela. In low-lying coastal areas the islands also support mangrove wetlands. The landscape features a range of cactus species and acacia trees.

== Location and description ==
The three islands are on the coastal shelf of South America, with bedrock of limestone and quartz diorite. Aruba has an area of 179 km2, with the highest population density. Curaçao, the middle island, has its highest point at Mt Christoffel of 372 metres (1,220 ft). Bonaire, the farthest island to the east, features a ringing coral reef and numerous inlets, lagoons, and mangrove forests.

Some parts of the islands transition into the Guajira–Barranquilla xeric scrub and some authors classify it as Paraguana xeric scrub ecoregion as part of the broader Venezuelan Coast ecoregion that includes La Costa xeric shrublands, Lara–Falcón dry forests, and the Araya and Paria xeric scrub creating an almost contiguous arid zone from Colombia to Trinidad. Furthermore, parts of the three islands are also part of the Amazon–Orinoco–Southern Caribbean mangroves.

Though the current WWF classification merged the ABC-islands ecoregion with the Caribbean islands ecoregion, this classification is not universally accepted, as the islands are on the South American plate and were partly connected to the mainland during the Late Pleistocene, as was Trinidad and Tobago, an island likewise not part of the Caribbean bioregion.

== Climate ==
The climate of the ecoregion is Hot semi-arid (Köppen climate classification (BSh)). This climate is characteristic of steppes, and in these islands supports a relatively even warm temperature of near 26.7 degrees C year-round. The trade winds from the Atlantic are a notable feature of the climate. Precipitation averages 350-550 mm/year, with a wet season from October to December.

== Flora and fauna ==
Most of the terrain is sparsely vegetated with cactus scrub. Common species of cactus are dagger cactus (Stenocereus griseus), Peruvian apple cactus (Cereus repandus), Pilosocereus lanuginosus (which is endemic to this and the Paraguana xeric scrub ecoregions), melon cactus (Melocactus), and prickly pear (Opuntia). The columnar cactus can reach heights of 6 meters. Aloe vera is an important commercial plant. The national tree of Curaçao is the distinctive divi divi tree (Libidibia coriaria), which is often contorted by the trade winds on the coast. Interspersed with the cactus are scrub or small trees such as twisted acacia (Vachellia tortuosa).

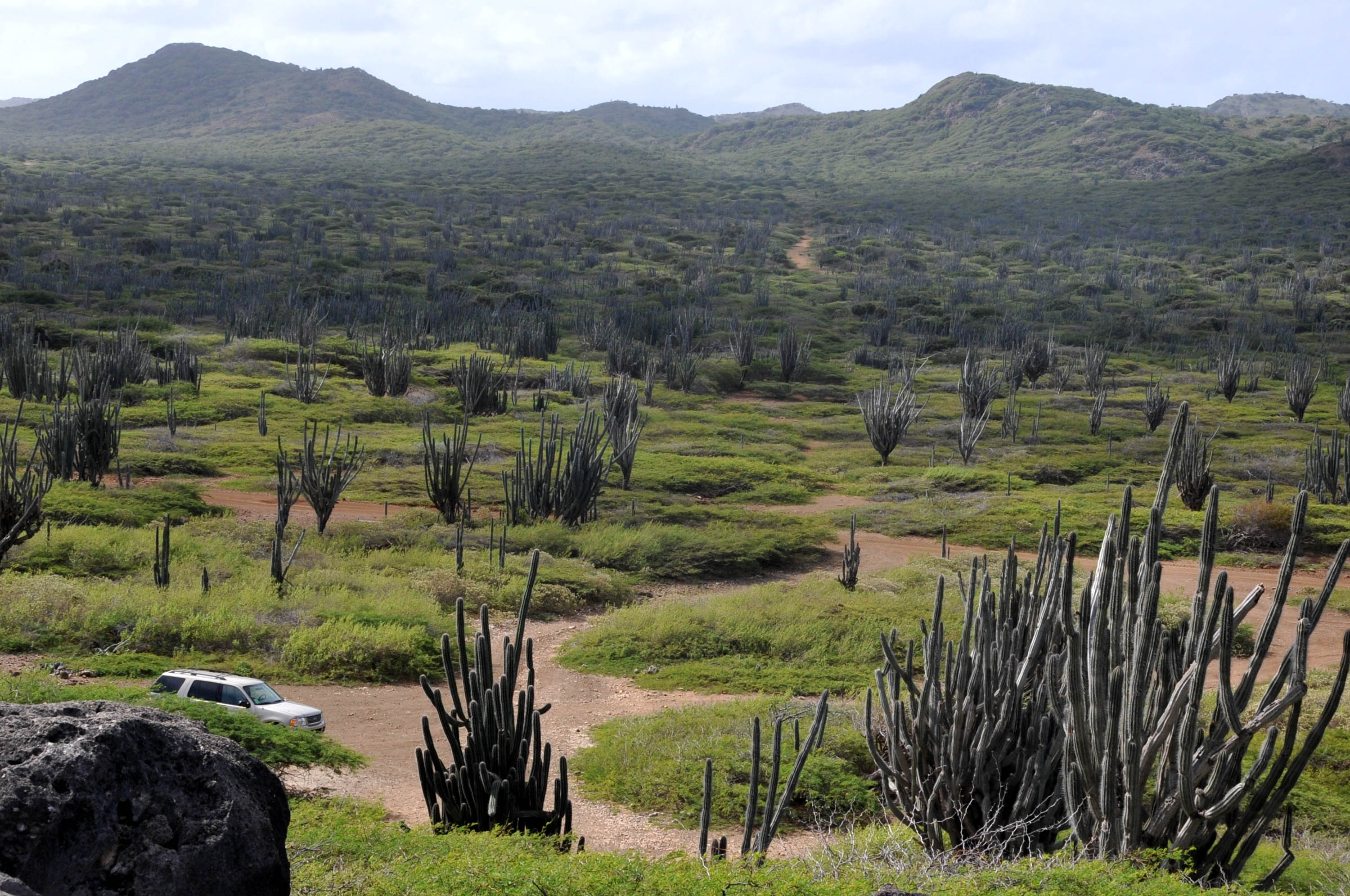
Washington Slagbaai National Park on Bonaire

== Protected areas ==
Officially protected areas on the islands include:

- Arikok National Park, on Aruba
- Christoffelpark, on Curaçao
- Washington Slagbaai National Park, on Bonaire
