= Motagua Valley thornscrub =

Ecoregion in Guatemala

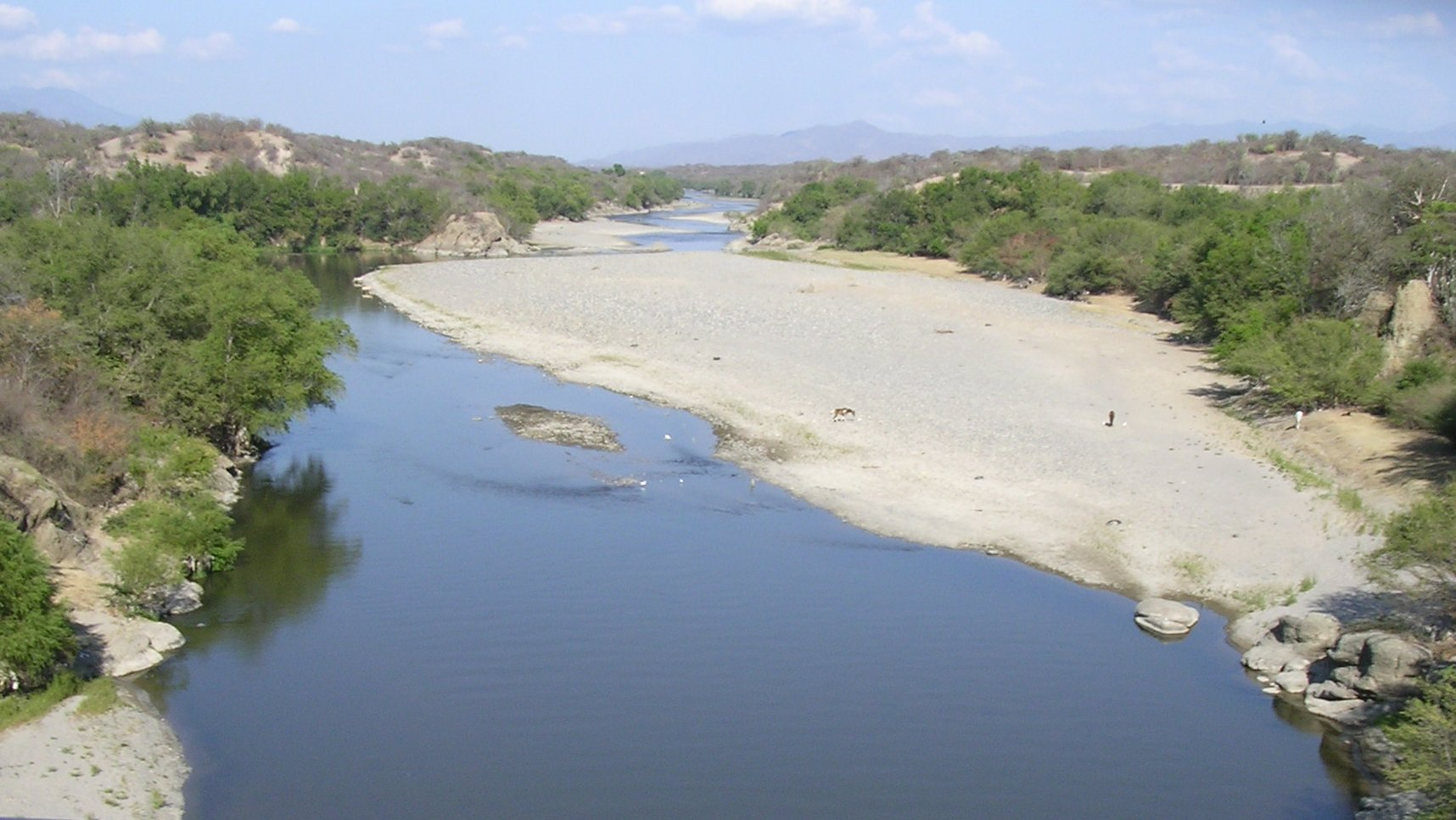
- Motagua River, Zacapa, Guatemala

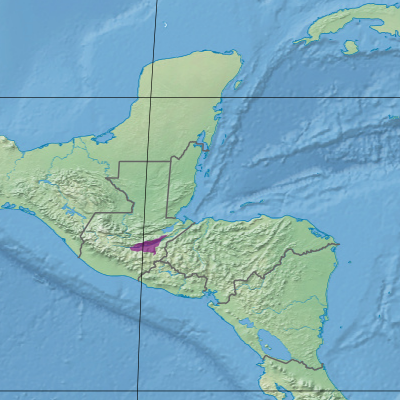
- Ecoregion territory (in purple)

Ecology
- Biome: Deserts and xeric shrublands
- Borders: Central American Atlantic moist forests; Central American montane forests; Central American pine–oak forests

Geography
- Area: 2,330 km^{2} (900 mi^{2})
- Country: Guatemala
- Coordinates: 14.95°N 89.65°W

Conservation
- Conservation status: Critical/Endangered
- Protected: 2.5%%

The Motagua Valley thornscrub ecoregion (WWF ID: NT1312) is located in the Motagua valley in eastern Guatemala. Surrounded by mountains and receiving relatively little precipitation, the valley is one of the driest in Central America and is characterized by thorn scrub vegetation. It covers an area of 2330 km^{2} and belongs to the deserts and xeric shrublands biome, as defined by the World Wildlife Fund.

== Location and description ==
The Motagua Valley is one of the driest areas of Central America. It is surrounded by mountains, such as the Sierra de las Minas in the north, reaching heights of up 3000 meters and the Sierra del Merendón in the south, which reaches over 2000 meters. This xeric climate contrasts sharply with the cloud forests found higher up in the nearby mountains.

== Climate ==
The climate of the ecoregion is Tropical savanna climate - dry winter (Köppen climate classification (Aw)). This climate is characterized by relatively even temperatures throughout the year, and a pronounced dry season. The driest month has less than 60 mm of precipitation, and is drier than the average month. The valley temperatures reach up to 50 °C, and it receives less than 500 mm of rainfall per year.

== Flora and fauna ==
The vegetation consists mainly of thorny species such as cactus of the genus Opuntia, acacias, and thorny bushes of the Fabaceae. These contrast sharply with the riparian forests in the river valleys with permanent waters.

The Motagua Valley thornscrub forms a habitat for 75 bird species, mainly Columbidae, Tyrannidae, Icteridae and Fringillidae, and it is the only place in Central America where Momotus mexicanus lives. It is also home to a number of threatened lizards, including the Guatemalan Spiny-tailed Iguana (Ctenosaura palearis), and the Motagua Valley beaded lizard (Heloderma charlesbogerti), one of the world's most endangered lizards which is endemic to this ecoregion.

== Protected areas ==
The ecoregion has few protected areas and is severely affected by the expansion of irrigation agriculture, which is the main cause of the rapid pace of its destruction. Protected areas cover 2.53% of the ecoregion, and include a portion of Cerro Miramundo National Park along with several regional municipal parks and private nature reserves.
