= Cayman Islands xeric scrub =

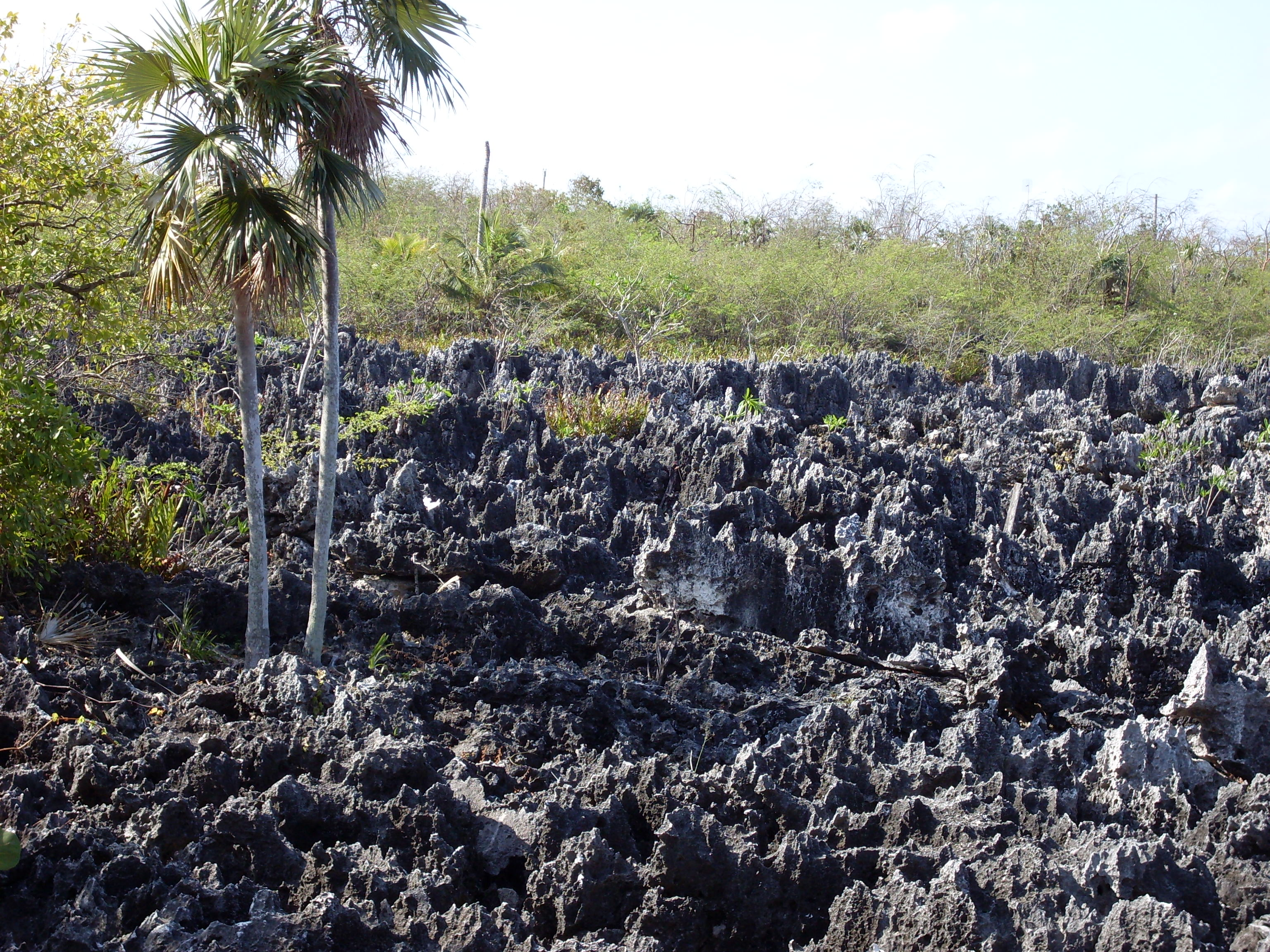
- Limestone formations, Hell, Grand Cayman

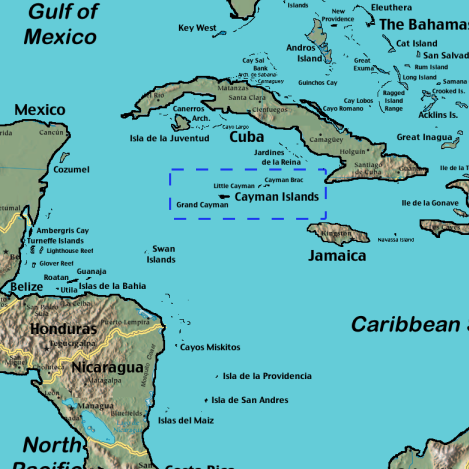
- Ecoregion territory (in blue dashed box)

Ecology
- Realm: Neotropic
- Biome: Deserts and xeric shrublands

Geography
- Area: 130 km^{2} (50 sq mi)
- Country: United Kingdom
- Coordinates: 19.349°N 81.113°W

The Cayman Islands xeric scrub ecoregion (WWF ID: NT1305) covers a portion of the Cayman Islands in the Caribbean Sea. The dry ('xeric') parts of the island are surrounded by mangroves, dry forest, or developed areas. Grand Cayman Island has been heavily cleared or degraded for human development; while the less populated islands have more intact shrub and wooded habitat.

== Location and description ==
The three main islands of the Caymans are Grand Cayman, Little Cayman and Cayman Brac. The islands are low and flat on a limestone base. The islands, 250 kilometers south of Cuba, are at the western end of the Greater Antilles.

== Climate ==
The climate of the ecoregion is Tropical savanna climate - dry winter (Köppen climate classification (Aw)). This climate is characterized by relatively even temperatures throughout the year and a pronounced dry season. The driest month has less than 60 mm of precipitation, and is drier than the average month. The wet months are May through November.

== Flora and fauna ==
While much of the islands are mangroves or developed areas, there are evergreen thickets on the eastern side of Grand Cayman, the north of Little Cayman, and the relatively higher elevations on Cayman Brac. Common species of trees and bushes are turpentine tree (Bursera simaruba), the near-threatened West-Indian mahogany (Swietenia mahagoni), (Picrodendron baccatum), white bully (Sideroxylon salicifolium), spicewood (Calyptranthes pallens), and fringetree (Chionanthus caymanensis). Also common are palms such as Cayman thatch palm Coccothrinax proctorii and Florida thatch palm Thrinax radiata; also climbing (epiphytic) cacti such as Moonlight cactus (Selenicereus).

The strong trade winds may help disperse plants over water: of the 601 vascular plant species on the islands, only 21 are endemic. A significant threat to the thickets is the introduction of the campeche logwood (Haematoxylum campechianum) for commercial purposes.
