= Windward Islands moist forests =

Ecoregion in the Caribbean

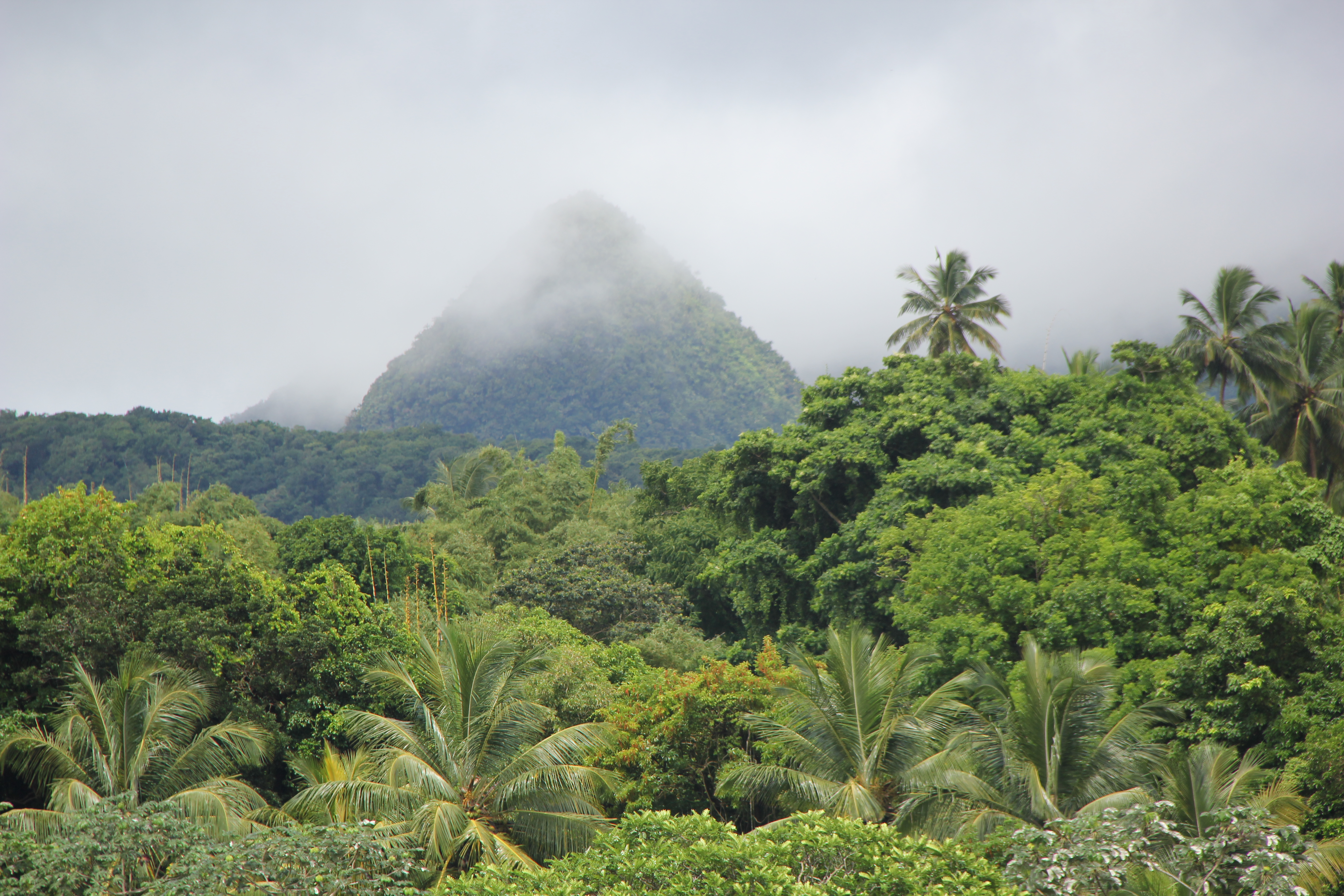
- One of the peaks of Mount Pelée, Martinique

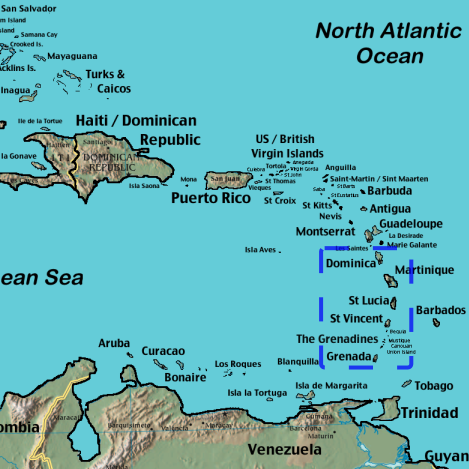
- Ecoregion territory (in blue dashed box)

Ecology
- Realm: Neotropic
- Biome: Tropical and subtropical moist broadleaf forests

Geography
- Area: 2,072 km^{2} (800 mi^{2})
- Country: Dominica, Grenada, Saint Lucia, Saint Vincent and the Grenadines
- Coordinates: 14.9°N 60.97°W

The Windward Islands moist forests ecoregion (WWF ID: NT0179) covers forested, high-precipitation areas of the volcanic Windward Islands. The forested areas are mostly at higher elevations in the interior of the islands, surrounded by dry forests, dry shrubland, or mangroves on the flat coastal lowlands. Closed forest of this ecoregion cover the majority of the islands. Species diversity is very high.

== Location and description ==
The Windward Islands are a volcanic island arc, with mountainous interiors in which steep slopes and difficulty converting the land to agriculture has provided some protection from human settlement and development. Moist forests are found on the islands of Dominica, Martinique, Saint Lucia, Saint Vincent, and Grenada.

== Climate ==
The climate of the ecoregion is Tropical rainforest climate (Köppen climate classification (Af)). This climate is characterized as hot, humid, and having at least 60 mm of precipitation every month. The rainy season occurs in the summer and fall, with precipitation ranging from 10,000 mm/year in the high elevations of Dominica to 3,750 mm/year in the lower elevations of Grenada.

== Flora and fauna ==
70% of the ecoregion is closed, broadleaf evergreen forest. Another 20% is open forest. The characteristics tree species of the mature forests are gommier (Dacryodes excelsa), (Amanoa caribaea), and trees of genus (Sloanea). The mature forests feature widespread epiphytes and lianas, with an understory of Licania ternatensis and Tapura antilliana. Forests that have been cleared for agriculture or timber are typically reforested by Miconia mirabilis and Cecropia schreberiana.
