= Cayman Islands dry forests =

Ecoregion in the Cayman Islands

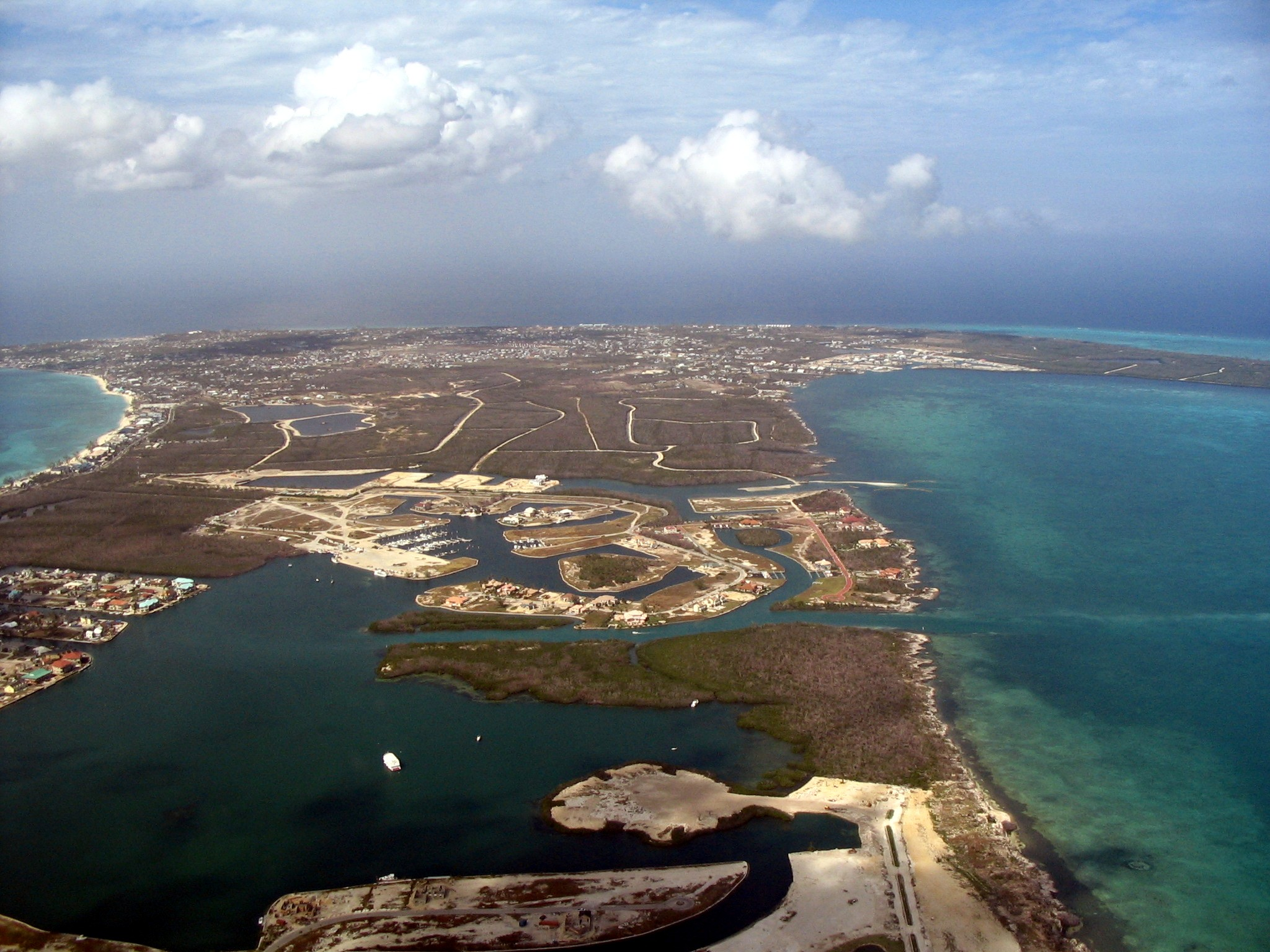
- Grand Cayman, Cayman Islands

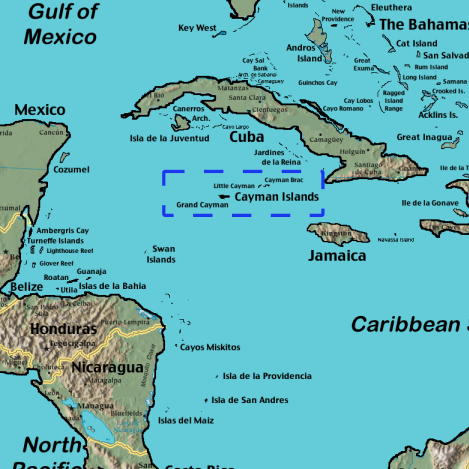
- Ecoregion territory (in blue dashed box)

Ecology
- Realm: Neotropic
- Biome: Tropical and subtropical moist broadleaf forests

Geography
- Area: 135 km^{2} (52 sq mi)
- Country: United Kingdom
- Coordinates: 19.339°N 81.201°W

The Cayman Islands dry forests ecoregion (WWF ID: NT0208) covers about half of the Cayman Islands in the Caribbean Sea. The other half of the low-lying islands are mangroves. The dry forests of Grand Cayman have been heavily cleared or degraded for human development; the less populated islands have more intact wooded habitat.

== Location and description ==
The three main islands of the Caymans are Grand Cayman, Little Cayman and Cayman Brac. The islands are low and flat on a limestone base. The islands, 200-300km south of Cuba, are at the western end of the Greater Antilles.

== Climate ==
The climate of the ecoregion is Tropical savanna climate - dry winter (Köppen climate classification (Aw)). This climate is characterized by relatively even temperatures throughout the year, and a pronounced dry season. The driest month has less than 60 mm of precipitation, and is drier than the average month.

== Flora and fauna ==
Very little primary forest is left on Grand Cayman. Most of the region, where undeveloped, is secondary growth. The islands are known for their orchids, of which there are 20 species, 5 endemic. There are 21 endemic species of reptiles and amphibians. OF the 46 breeding bird species on the islands, 17 are endemic. The only native mammals on the islands are the eight species of bats, none of which are endemic.

== Protected areas ==
Officially protected areas of the Cayman Islands include:

- Botanic Park and Salina Reserve Important Bird Area
- Booby Pond Nature Reserve
