= Leeward Islands moist forests =

Forested ecoregion in the Caribbean Sea

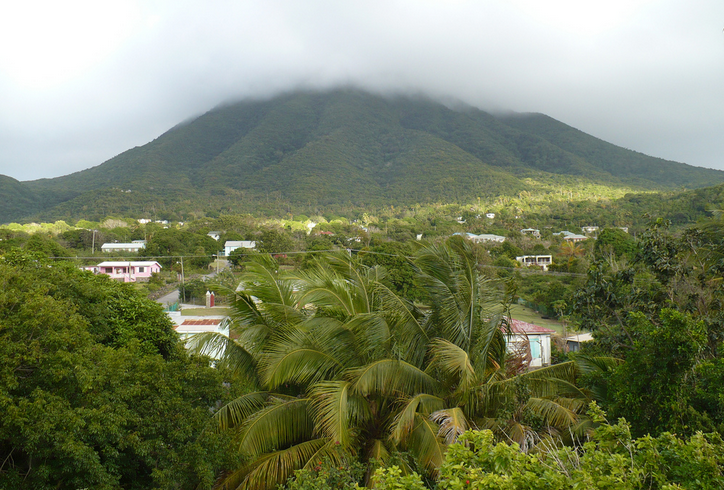
- Nevis Peak, on the island of Nevis

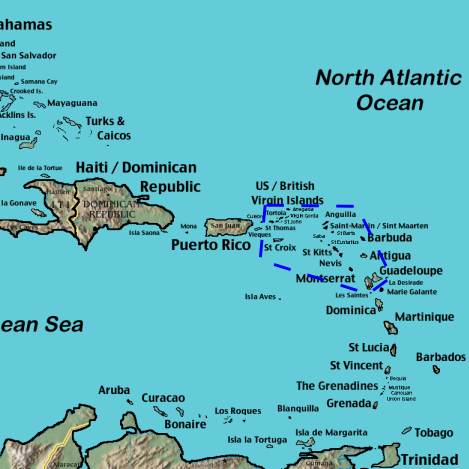
- Ecoregion territory (in blue dashed box)

Ecology
- Realm: Neotropic
- Biome: Tropical and subtropical moist broadleaf forests

Geography
- Area: 1,036 km^{2} (400 mi^{2})
- Country: United States, United Kingdom, France, Netherlands, Saint Kitts and Nevis, Antigua and Barbuda
- Coordinates: 16.195°N 61.690°W

The Leeward Islands moist forests ecoregion (WWF ID: NT0134) covers the forested areas of the Leeward Islands on the northeastern edge of the Caribbean Sea, stretching from the Virgin Islands in the west to Guadeloupe to the southeast. The forested areas are typically in the core interior of the islands, and at the higher elevations of the volcanic islands. Non-forested lower elevations in the region receive less rainfall and are typically semi-arid. A notable feature of the ecoregion is its position in the main hurricane track. The frequent damage to trees produces in many places an uneven forest canopy, and an opening of the canopy that allows more pre-climax trees to grow.

== Location and description ==
The island groups with forests making up this ecoregion are:

- United States Virgin Islands (US) - western portion of the islands
- British Virgin Islands (UK) - western portion of the islands
- Saint Kitts and Nevis - the forested areas
- Antigua and Barbuda - a small portion of southern Antigua
- Montserrat (UK) - the central, mountainous areas
- Guadeloupe (Fr) - about 85% of Basse Terre, the western island

There are also small patches of moist forest on the smaller islands in the region. The Leeward Islands are formed on two arcs; the inner (western) arc features active volcanos and higher precipitation; the outer arc tend towards limestone-capped submerged volcanos and less precipitation.

== Climate ==
The ecoregion has a Tropical climate with individual islands having different levels of precipitation that classify them into either Tropical rainforest climate (Köppen climate classification (Af)), Tropical savanna climate - dry winter (Köppen climate classification (Aw)), or Tropical monsoon climate (Köppen climate classification (Am)).

== Flora and fauna ==
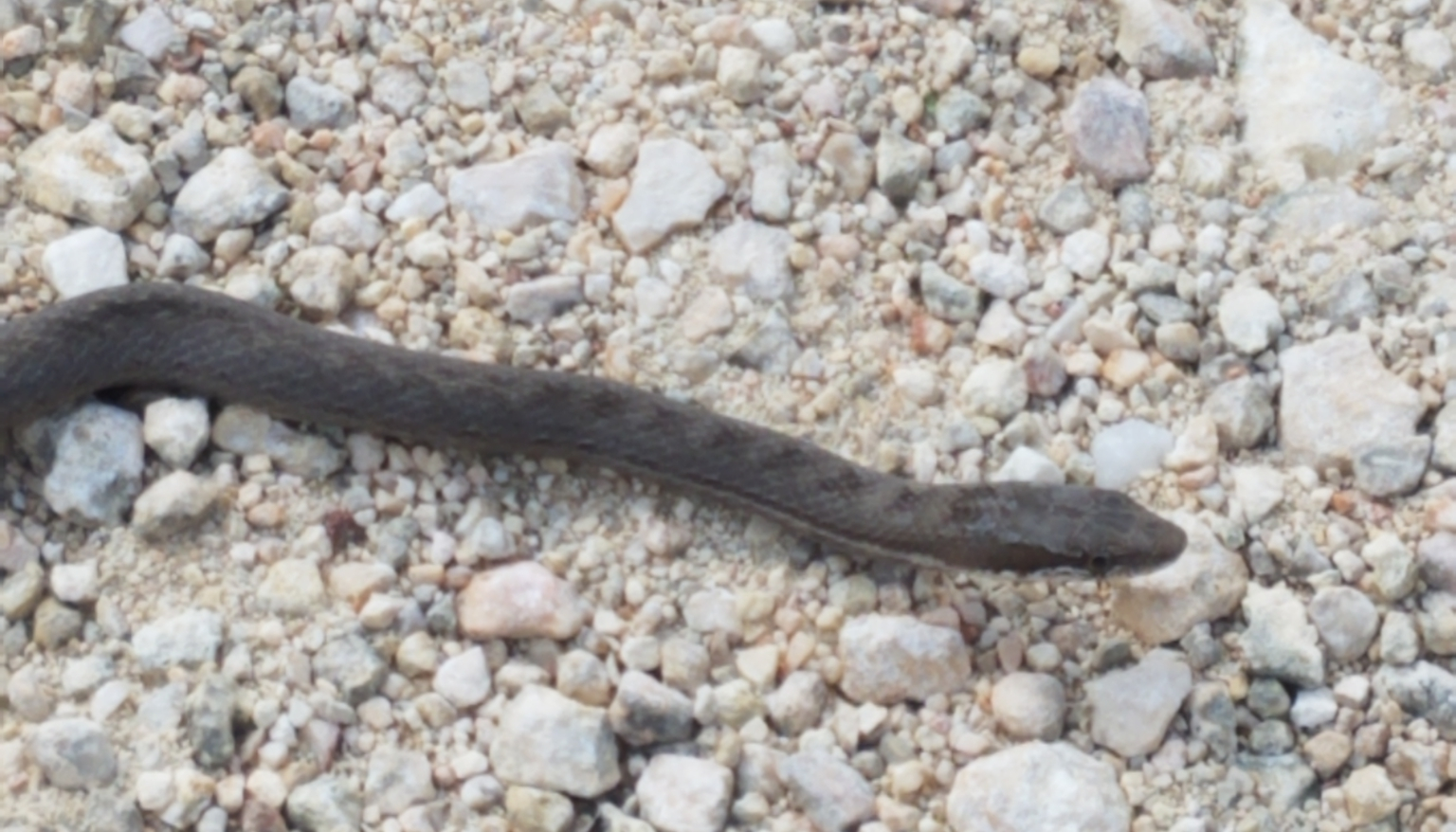
Leeward island racer, an endemic snake specie of Leeward Island

Like many island chains, there are many endemic species in the ecoregion. Species diversity and endemism are higher on the larger islands, and those farther from the mainland, such as Guadeloupe. There are small patches of most forest on the smaller islands, such as Saba, and for this ecoregion the term 'moist forest' includes areas that might also be classified as rain forest or cloud forest. Common species are those of genus Miconia and Clusia. In less disturbed areas the common species is Dacroydes excelsa. At higher elevations, palm trees are common, such as the mountain cabbage palm Prestoea acuminata var. montana.

The most common mammals in the ecoregion are bats; the ten recorded species include the endangered Guadeloupe big brown bat (Eptesicus guadeloupensis) and the vulnerable Thomas's yellow-shouldered bat (Sturnira thomasi).

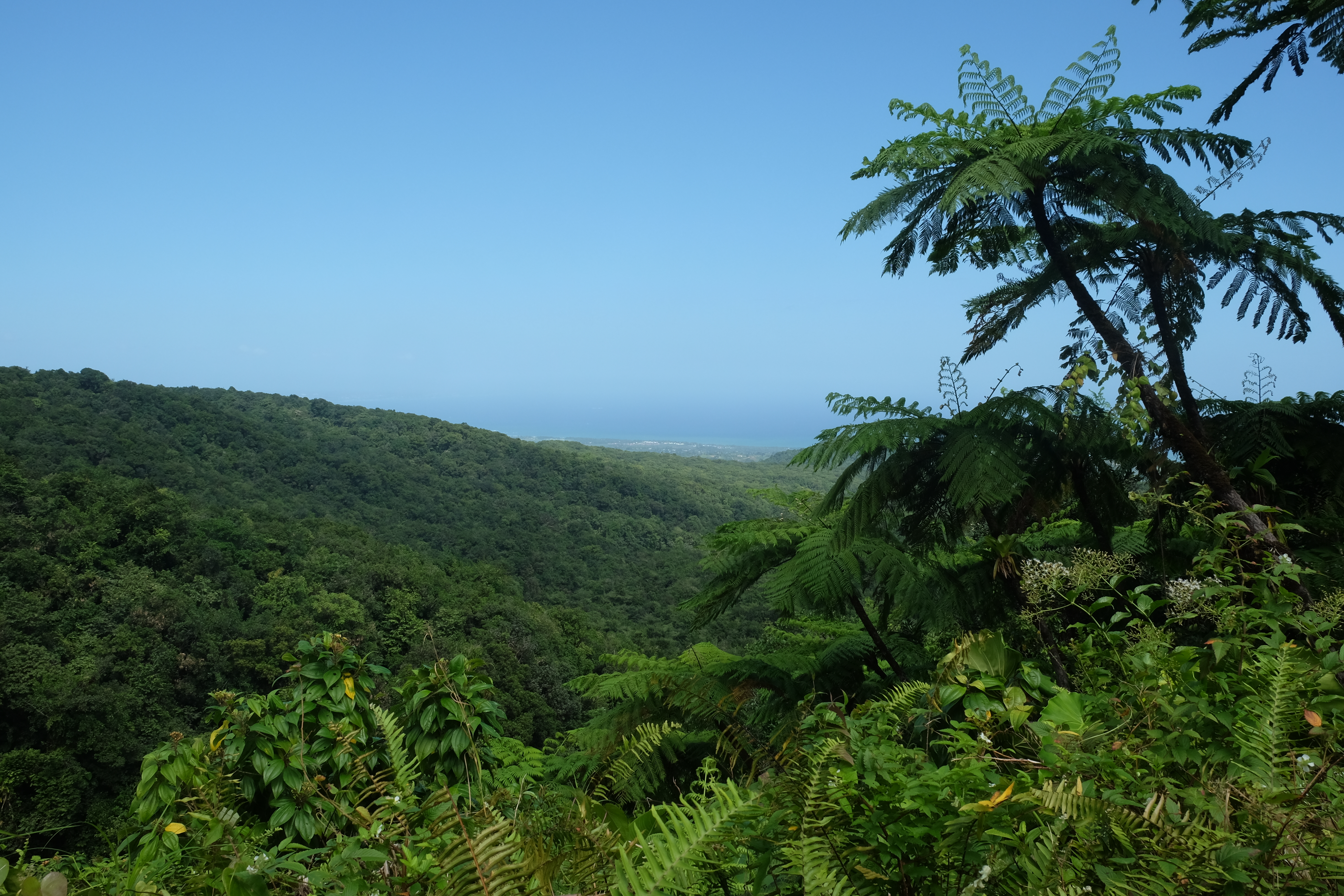
Forest on Basse Terre, Gaudeloupe

== Protected areas ==
Over 76% of this ecoregion (the forested areas, not the entire islands) is in an officially protected area, including:

- Virgin Islands National Park, in the US Virgin Islands
- Guadeloupe National Park, in Gaudeloupe
- Centre Hills (Forest Reserve on Montserrat)
- Wallings Forest Reserve, in Antigua
