= Windward Islands xeric scrub =

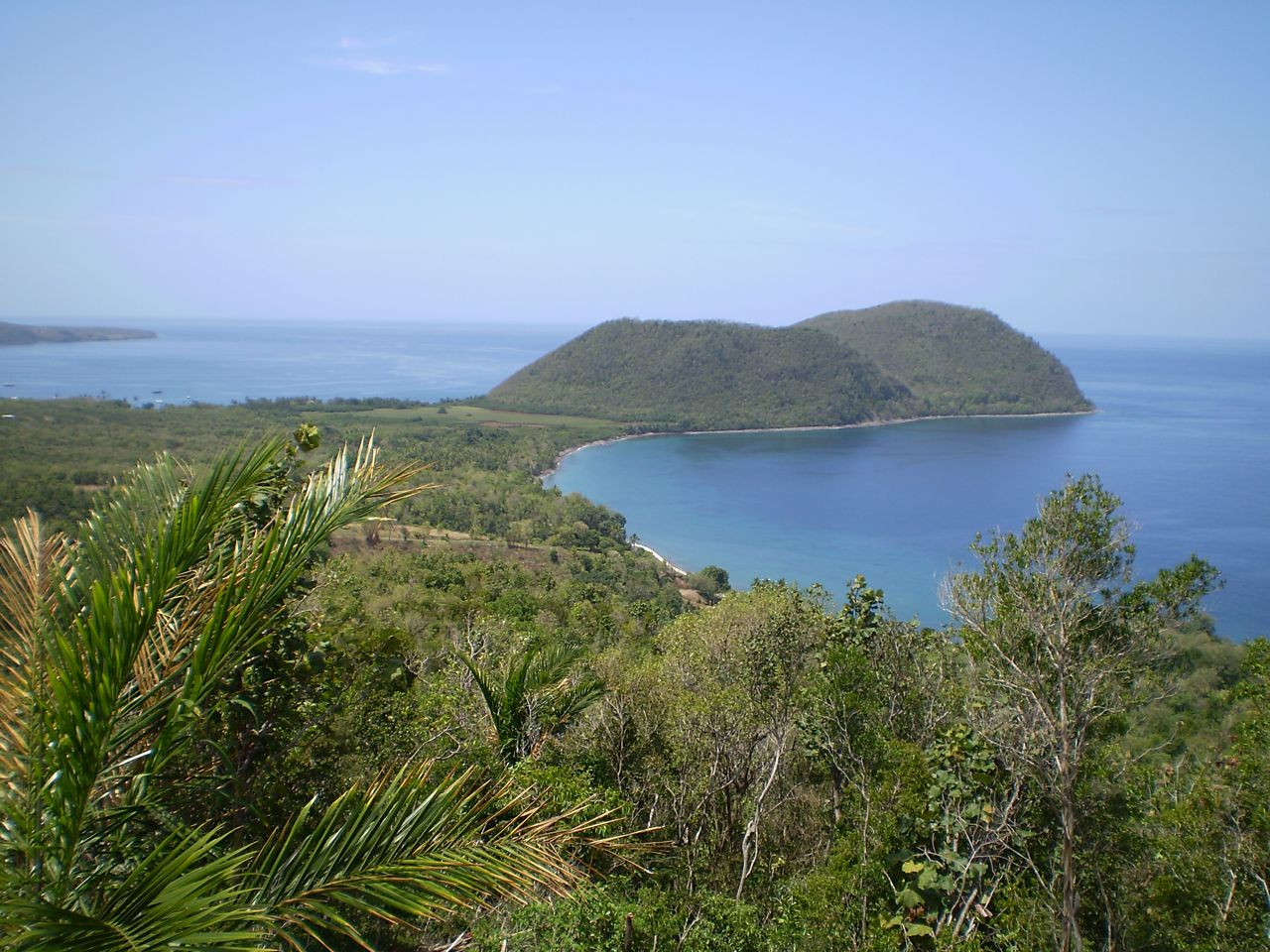
- Cabrits National Park, Dominica

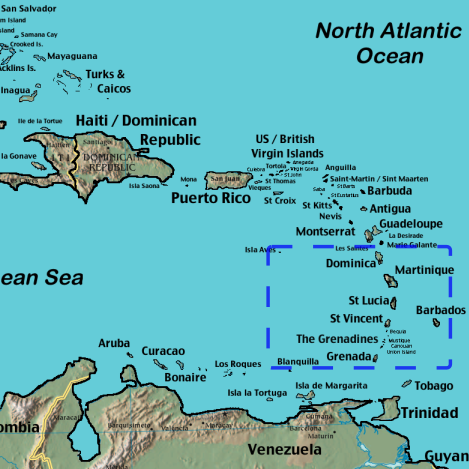
- Ecoregion territory (in blue hashed box)

Ecology
- Realm: Neotropic
- Biome: Deserts and xeric shrublands

Geography
- Country: Dominica, Saint Lucia, Barbados, Saint Vincent and the Grenadines
- Coordinates: 13.176°N 59.564°W

The Windward Islands xeric scrub ecoregion (WWF ID: NT1317) covers the relatively small areas of the Windward Islands that receive low levels of precipitation. The dry areas of these islands are the low coastal areas that receive less precipitation. Because the dry scrub land is generally flat, near the coast, and not as obviously in need of conservation as the upland forests of the interior, they are more vulnerable to human settlement and development for agriculture.

== Location and description ==
The ecoregion is represented mostly in the low coastal zones of Barbados, Dominica, and Martinique; also the northern tip of Saint Lucia and the southern shores of Saint Vincent and the Grenadines. These islands are part of a volcanic arc, and the soils of the low coastal areas are mostly alluvial and ash, not the harder volcanic rocks of the mountainous areas.

== Climate ==
The climate of the ecoregion is Tropical savanna climate - dry winter (Köppen climate classification (Aw)). This climate is characterized by relatively even temperatures throughout the year, and a pronounced dry season in the winter and spring. The driest month has less than 60 mm of precipitation, and is drier than the average month. Precipitation in the ecoregion ranges from 1,000 mm/year (Dominica) to 1,600 mm/year (Saint Vincent).

== Flora and fauna ==
Common species of trees and shrubs are lancepots of genus Lonchocarpus (such as Lonchocarpus pentaphyllus, Pisonia fragrans, blackwood (Haematoxylon campechianum), Myrsia atrifolia, Chrysophyllum argenteum, flowering plants of genus Erythroxylum, Opuntia dilenii (type of prickly pear), and Royen's tree cactus (Pilosocereus royenii).

There are relatively few endemic species because of the small size of the dry areas. A significant threat to local fauna is posed by introduced species such as the mongoose (Urva auropunctata), feral cats, and rodents.
