= Lesser Antilles mangroves =

Ecoregion in the Lesser Antilles

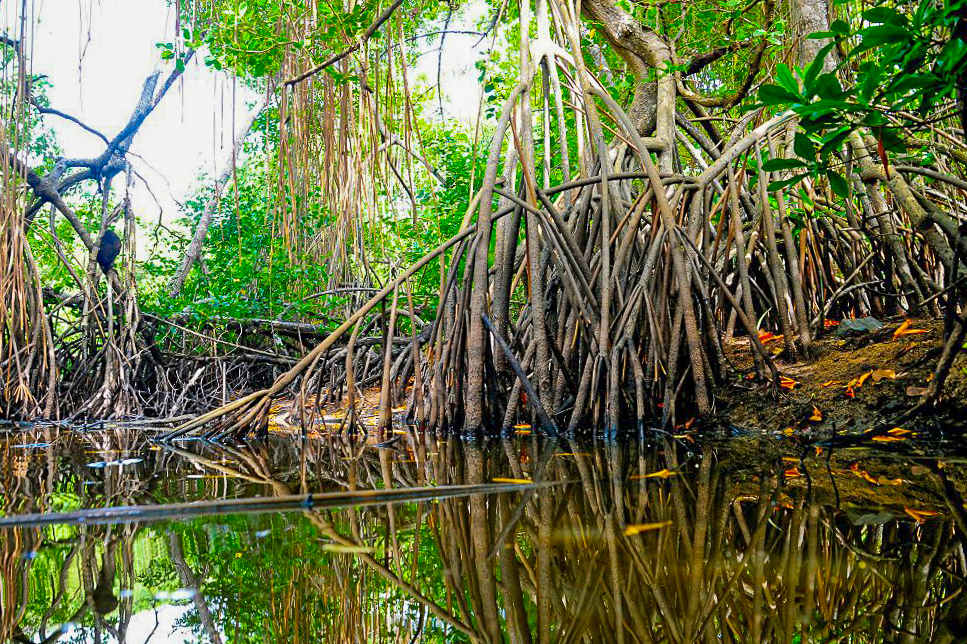
- Mangrove in Martinique Regional Nature Park

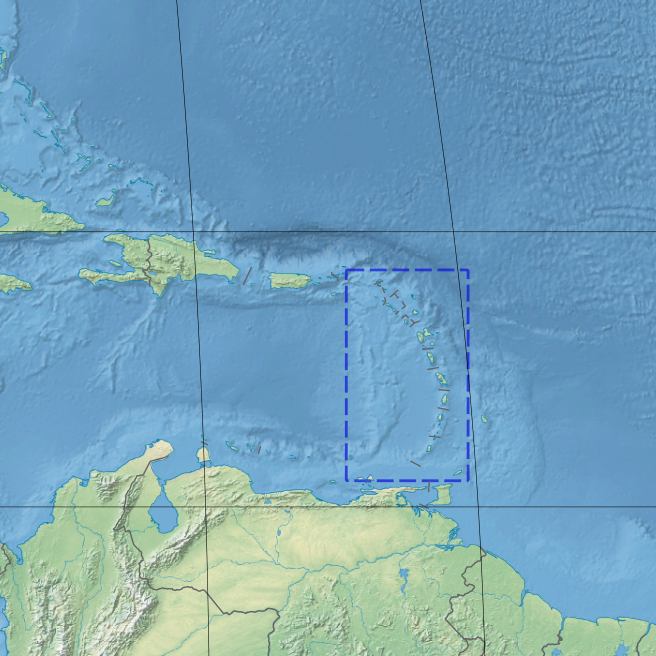
- Ecoregion territory (coastal lowlands on islands in box)

Ecology
- Realm: Neotropic
- Biome: Mangroves

Geography
- Area: 777 km^{2} (300 sq mi)
- Country: Dominica, Martinique, Saint Lucia, Saint Vincent and the Grenadines, Grenada
- Coordinates: 14.75°N 61°W

The Lesser Antilles mangroves ecoregion (WWF ID: NT1416) covers the salt-water habitats along the coasts of the islands on the divide between the Caribbean Sea and the Atlantic Ocean. the included islands stretch from Anguilla in the north to the island of Grenada in the south. The species diversity of these small islands is less than that of the larger islands of the Greater Antilles with to the west, but endemism is high due to the relative isolation of the different islands.

== Location and description ==
The primary islands in this ecoregion with mangrove forests are Dominica, Martinique, Saint Lucia, Saint Vincent and the Grenadines, and Grenada. The mangroves are found on coastal lowlands where salt-water wetlands penetrate. This is commonly on river deltas, on the margins on protected lagoons, and behind protective beaches.

== Climate ==
The climate of the ecoregion is Tropical rainforest climate (Köppen climate classification (Af)). This climate is characterized as hot, humid, and having at least 60 mm of precipitation every month.

== Flora and fauna ==
Differences in mangrove character among the islands is affected by salinity and nutrient levels. The southernmost islands are in the offshore currents of fresh water flowing out of the Orinoco River and Amazon River. As a result, they have more developed mangrove systems. The more northerly islands have higher salinity levels, and more diverse reefs and sea grass beds associated with mangroves.

The two most common mangrove species in the ecoregion are red mangrove (Rhizophora mangle) and white mangrove (Laguncularia racemosa). Other characteristic mangrove species are black mangrove (Avicennia germinans), Avicennia schaueriana, and button mangrove (Conocarpus erectus).
