= Leeward Islands xeric scrub =

Xeric shrubland ecoregion of the Leeward Islands

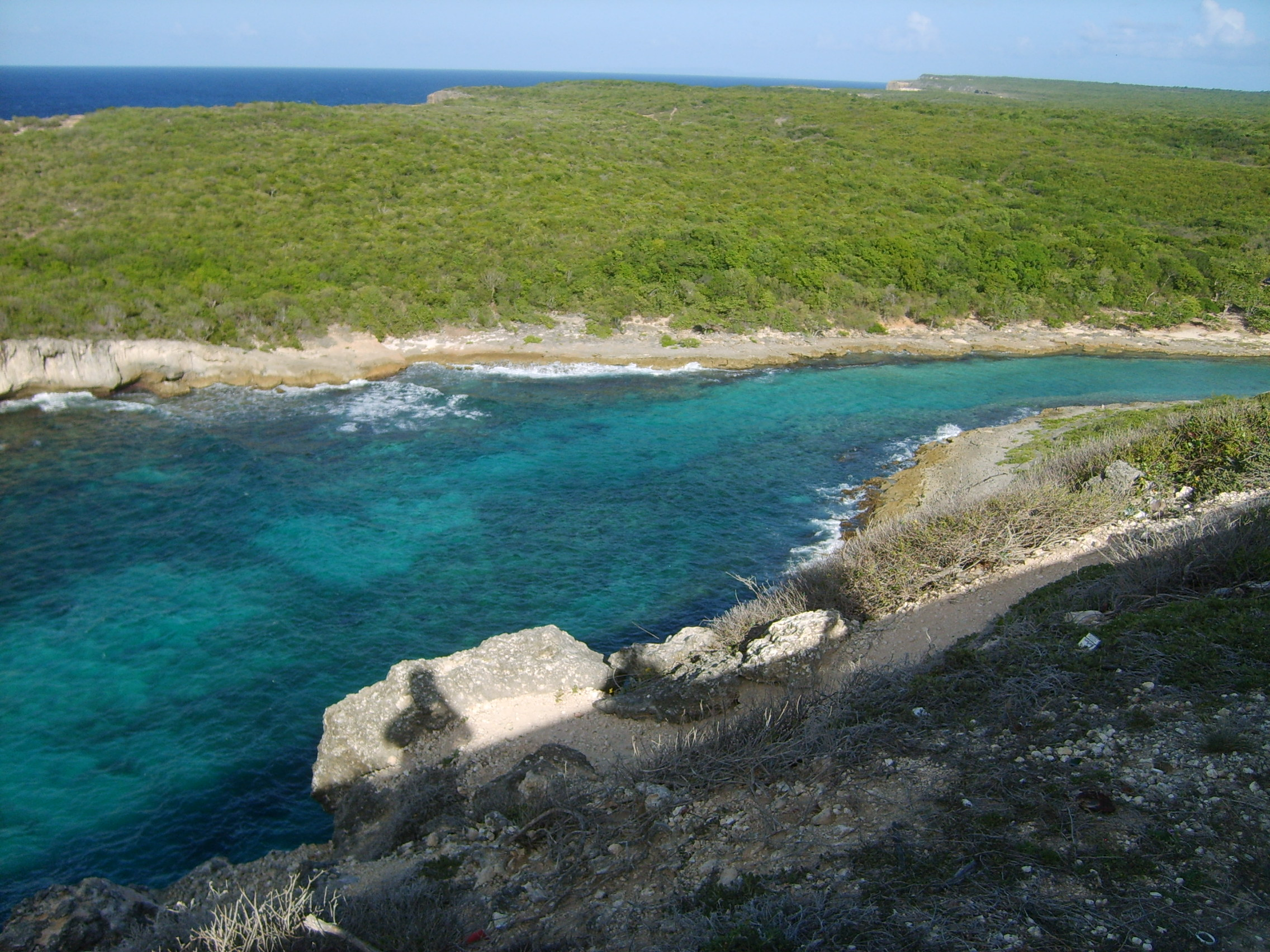
- Grande-Terre Island, Guadeloupe

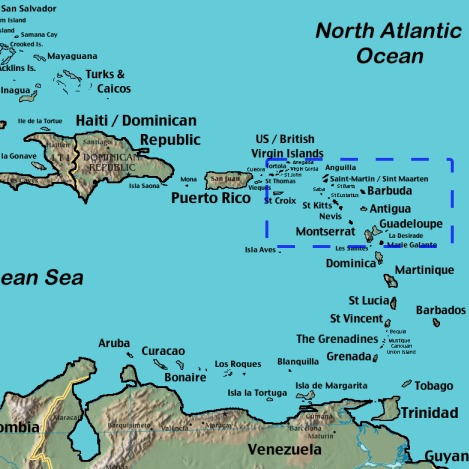
- Ecoregion territory (in blue hashed box)

Ecology
- Realm: Neotropic
- Biome: Deserts and xeric shrublands

Geography
- Area: 1,554 km^{2} (600 mi^{2})
- Country: United States, United Kingdom, France, Netherlands, Saint Kitts and Nevis, Antigua and Barbuda
- Coordinates: 16.407°N 61.460°W

The Leeward Islands xeric scrub ecoregion (WWF ID: NT1310) covers the dry ('xeric'), non-forested areas of the Leeward Islands on the northeastern edge of the Caribbean Sea, stretching from the Virgin Islands in the west to Guadeloupe to the southeast. The non-forested areas are generally low scrub shrub, on the low elevations around the peripheries of the islands. Non-forested lower elevations in the region receive less rainfall and are typically semi-arid. A notable feature of the ecoregion is its position in the main hurricane track. The frequent damage to trees allows more pre-climax shrubs and trees to grow. There are a number of endemic species, as in common with islands.

== Location and description ==
The largest island groups with dry shrub areas making up this ecoregion are:

- United States Virgin Islands (US) - eastern portions of the islands
- British Virgin Islands (UK) - eastern portions of the islands
- Saint Kitts and Nevis - low-lying coastal areas
- Antigua and Barbuda - northern Antigua and all of Barbuda
- Montserrat (UK) - low, coastal areas
- Guadeloupe (Fr) - 15% of Basse Terre, the western island, and most of Grande-Terre, Marie-Galante, La Désirade, and smaller islands

There are also smaller islands in the region. The Leeward Islands are formed on two arcs; the inner (western) arc features active volcanos and higher precipitation; the outer arc tend towards limestone-capped submerged volcanos and less precipitation.

== Climate ==
The ecoregion has a Tropical climate overall, with individual islands having different levels of precipitation that classify them into either Tropical rainforest climate (Köppen climate classification (Af)), Tropical savanna climate - dry winter (Köppen climate classification (Aw)), or Tropical monsoon climate (Köppen climate classification (Am)).

== Flora and fauna ==
The ecoregion features dry seral (intermediate stage of ecological succession) floral communities. These range from herbaceous strand vegetation (plants that grow on the sandy ground above the high-time line of the beach), shrubland (small woody plants), savanna (mixed woodland and grasslands), and littoral woodlands (transitional communities on the edge of full forest).

Plant communities in the region are often associated with the former agricultural use of the land. In areas that were formerly cotton or sugar cane fields, for example, the characteristic species are often gum arabic tree (Acacia nilotica), (Acacia lutea), twisted acacia (Acacia tortuosa), or sweet acacia (Vachellia farnesiana). Areas associated with charcoal production now feature Bursera and Pisonia fragrans. Savanna areas feature acacias, (Prosopis chilensis), and common guava (Psidium guajava).

== Protected areas ==
Officially protected areas in the ecoregion include:

- Virgin Islands National Park, in the US Virgin Islands
- Guadeloupe National Park, in Guadeloupe
