= Lebrija River =

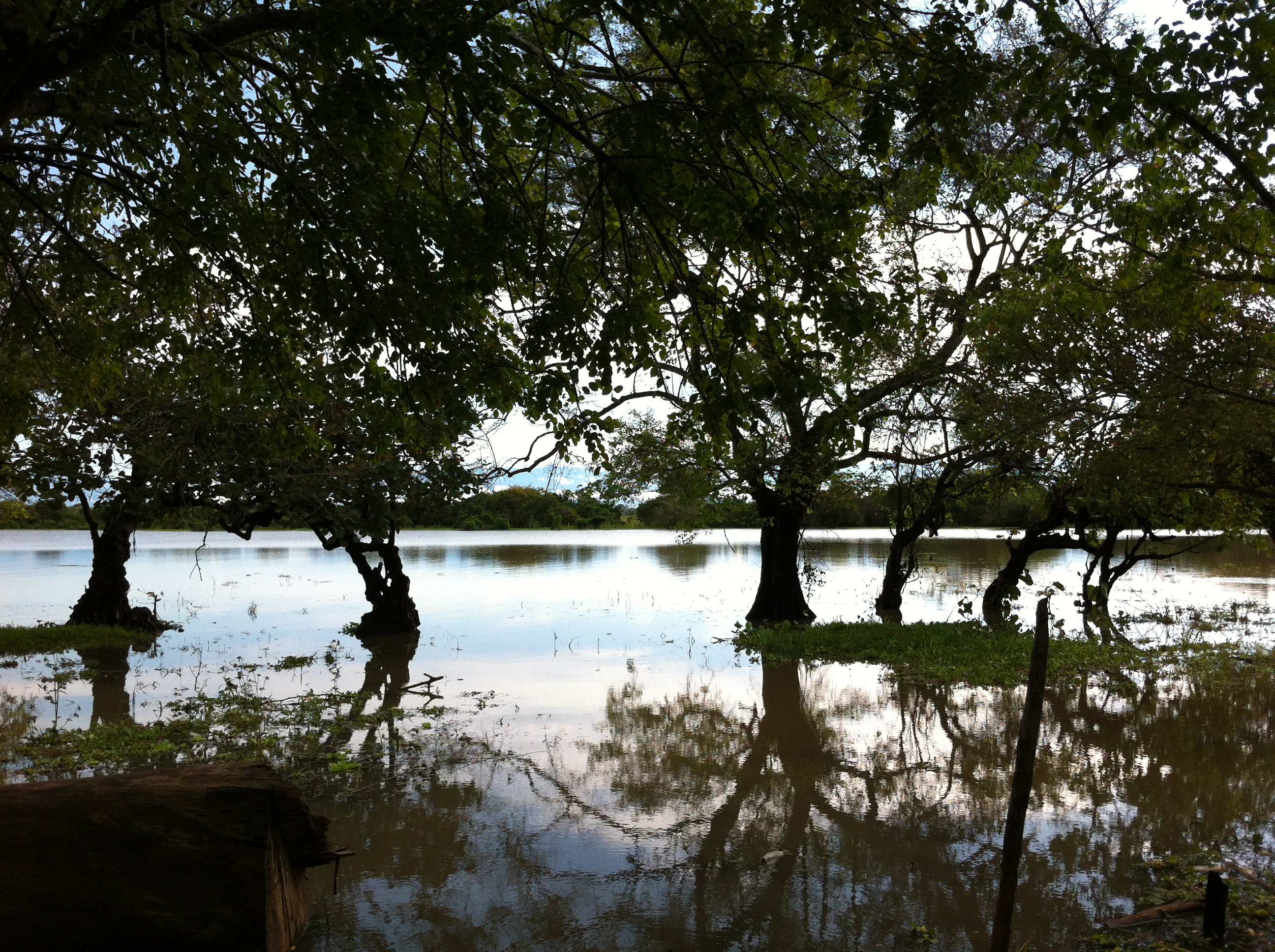
- Barranca de Lebrija corregimiento on the banks of the Lebrija river (Municipality of Aguachica).

- Location of the Lebrija River in Colombia
- Etymology: Antonio de Lebrija
- Native name: Río Lebrija (Spanish)

Location
- Country: Colombia
- Departments: Santander; Cesar
- Provinces: Metropolitana - Yariguies / South of Cesar
- Municipalities: Piedecuesta; Girón; Bucaramanga; Lebrija; Sabana de Torres; Puerto Wilches

Physical characteristics
- Source: Eastern Ranges
  - location: Piedecuesta
  - coordinates: 7°05′59.1″N 73°00′55.1″W
  - elevation: 2,532 m (8,307 ft)
- Mouth: Magdalena River
  - location: Puerto Wilches / Loma de Corredor (Aguachica)
  - coordinates: 8°07′55.3″N 73°46′24.5″W
  - elevation: 41.1 m (135 ft)
- Basin size: 8,790 km^{2} (3,390 sq mi)
- Discharge
  - location: San Rafael
  - minimum: 55.1 m^{3}/s (1,950 cu ft/s)
  - maximum: 706 m^{3}/s (24,900 cu ft/s)

Basin features
- River system: Magdalena Basin; Caribbean Sea

Lebrija River is a river of northern Colombia. It originates in the Eastern Ranges of the Colombian Andes in Piedecuesta and flows through the northern part of the department of Santander into the Magdalena River in Puerto Wilches.

== Etymology ==
The Lebrija River is named after Antonio de Lebrija, the conquistador who discovered the river in 1529.

== Description ==
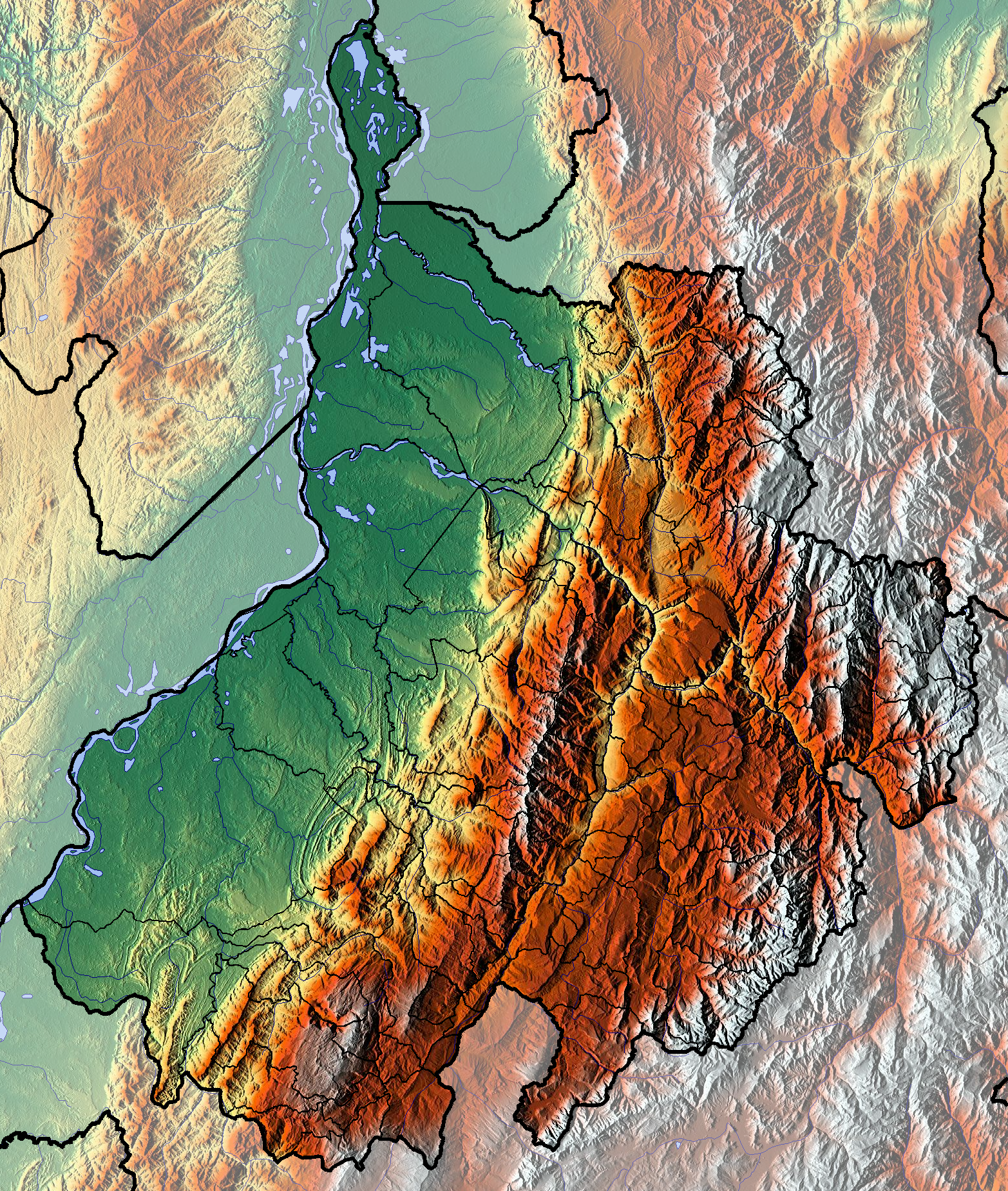
Source and mouth of the Lebrija River in the Santander Department

The Lebrija River originates at an altitude of 2,532 metres (8,307 ft) in the Eastern Ranges of the Colombian Andes to the northeast of Piedecuesta, Santander. The Lebrija River, a confluence of the Suratá River and the Río de Oro, flows northward through the municipalities Girón, capital of Santander Bucaramanga, Lebrija and Sabana de Torres to flow into the Magdalena River near the Loma de Corredor, Puerto Wilches, Santander at an altitude of 41.1 m (135 ft). In the lower course of the river, it forms the natural boundary between Santander and Cesar, close to the border with Bolívar. About 100 kilometres (62 mi) of the river, with a total basin size of 8,790 square kilometres (1.362×10^{13} sq in), is navegable.

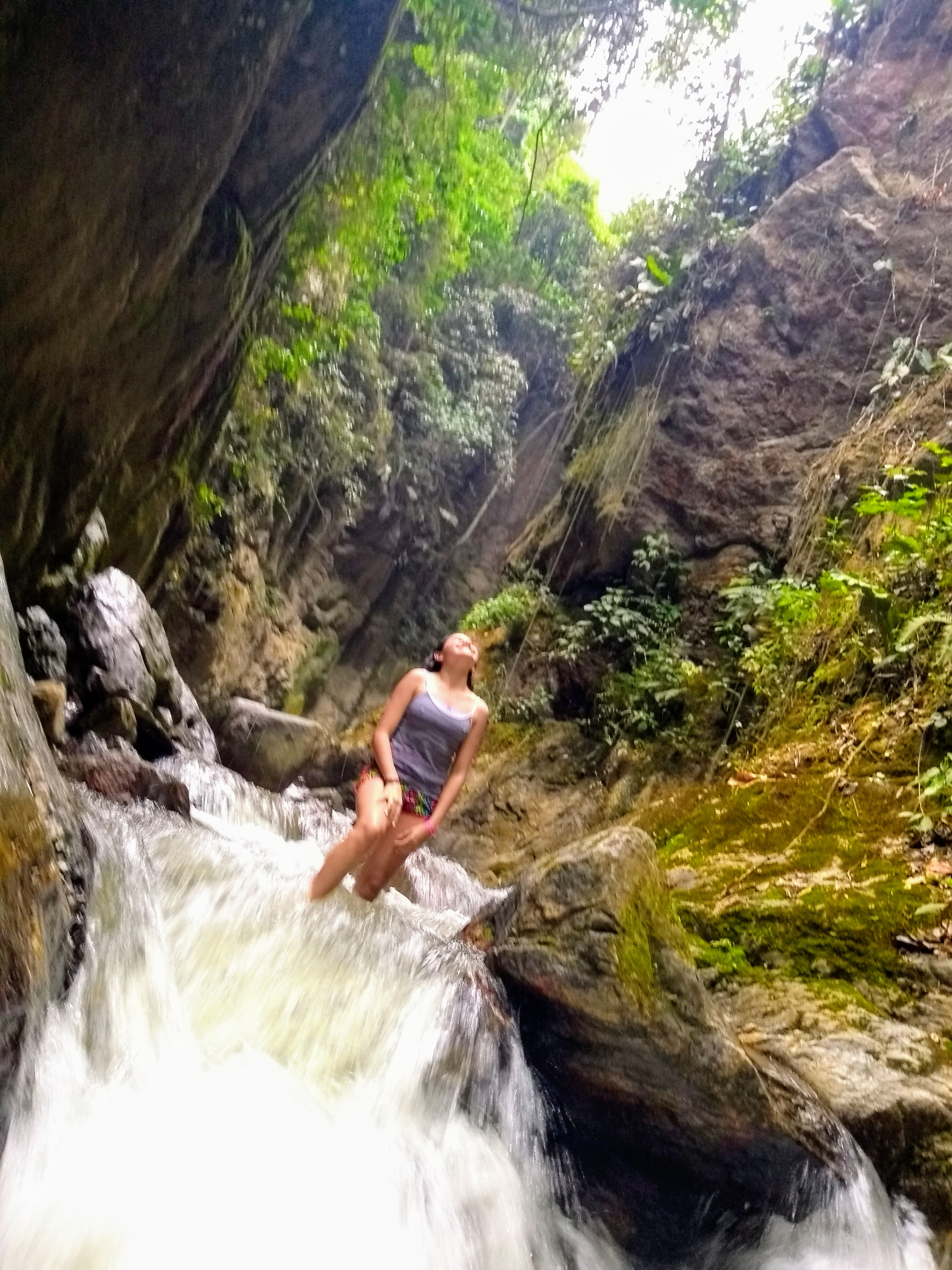
Canyon near the El Ensueño waterfall, upper Lebrija river basin, in Piedecuesta

=== Geology ===
The type locality of the Girón Formation was identified along the Lebrija River in 1954. At this type section, a total thickness of 4,650 metres (15,260 ft) of the formation was registered in 1968. The type locality of the 1 kilometre (0.62 mi) thick La Paz Formation is also located near the river.

=== Climate ===
The heavy rains over the capital district of Santander, the metropolitan area of Bucaramanga, have caused mortality of fish in the Lebrija River. The Lebrija River transports an average of 4,739,000,000 cubic metres (1.674×10^{11} cu ft) of water per year. The maximum discharge at the San Rafael station has been registered in December with 706 cubic metres per second (24,900 cu ft/s) and the minimum in January with 55.1 cubic metres per second (1,950 cu ft/s). The higher basin of Lebrija Alto has between 66 and 2,065 millimetres (2.6 and 81.3 in) of precipitation per year in a bimodal pattern. The rainy seasons are March to May and September to November with drier periods from December to February and June to August. The temperature ranges from 0 and 35 °C (32 and 95 °F), the relative humidity reached 81% and the hours of sunshine vary between 1472 and 1913.

=== Flora and fauna ===
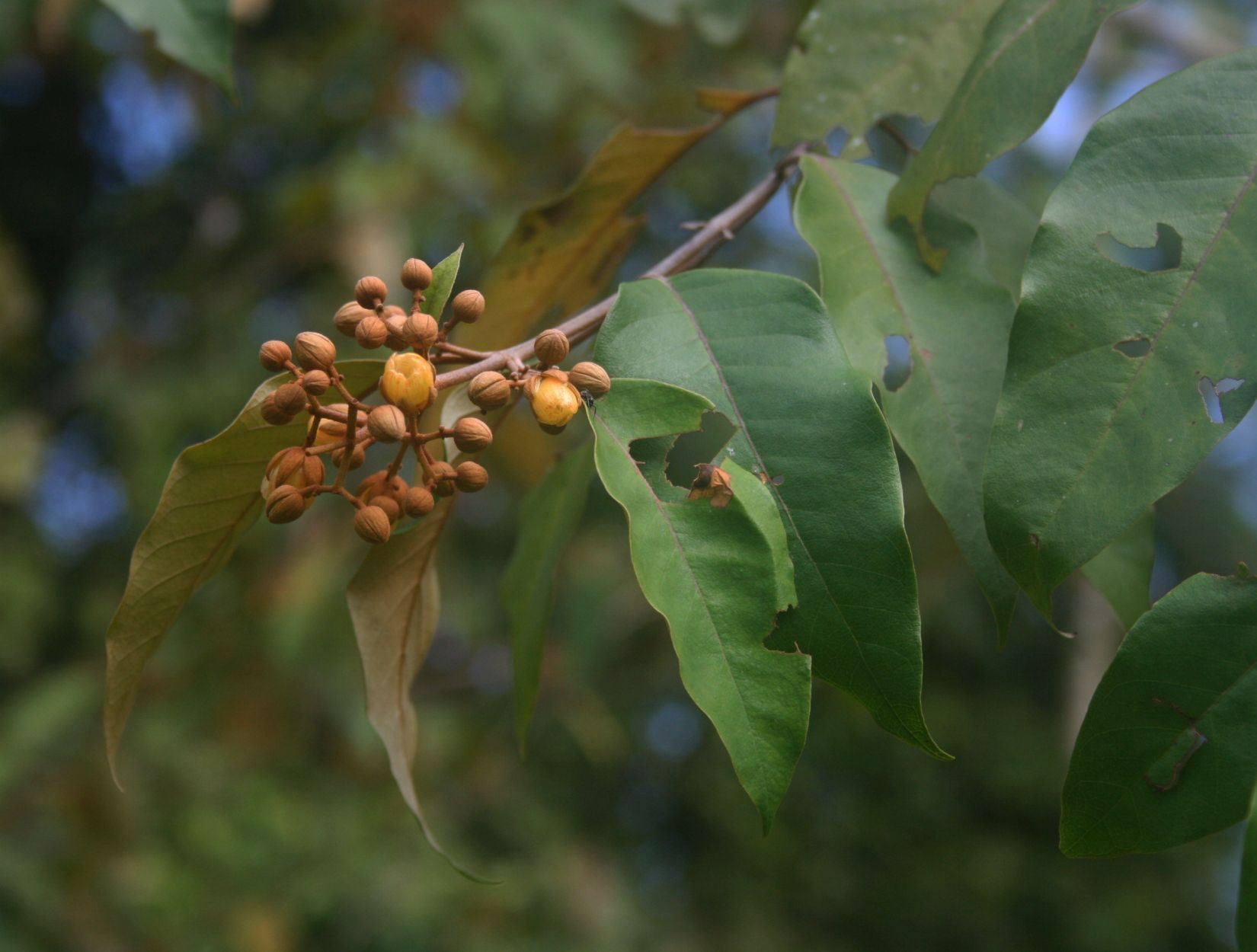
Vismia baccifera

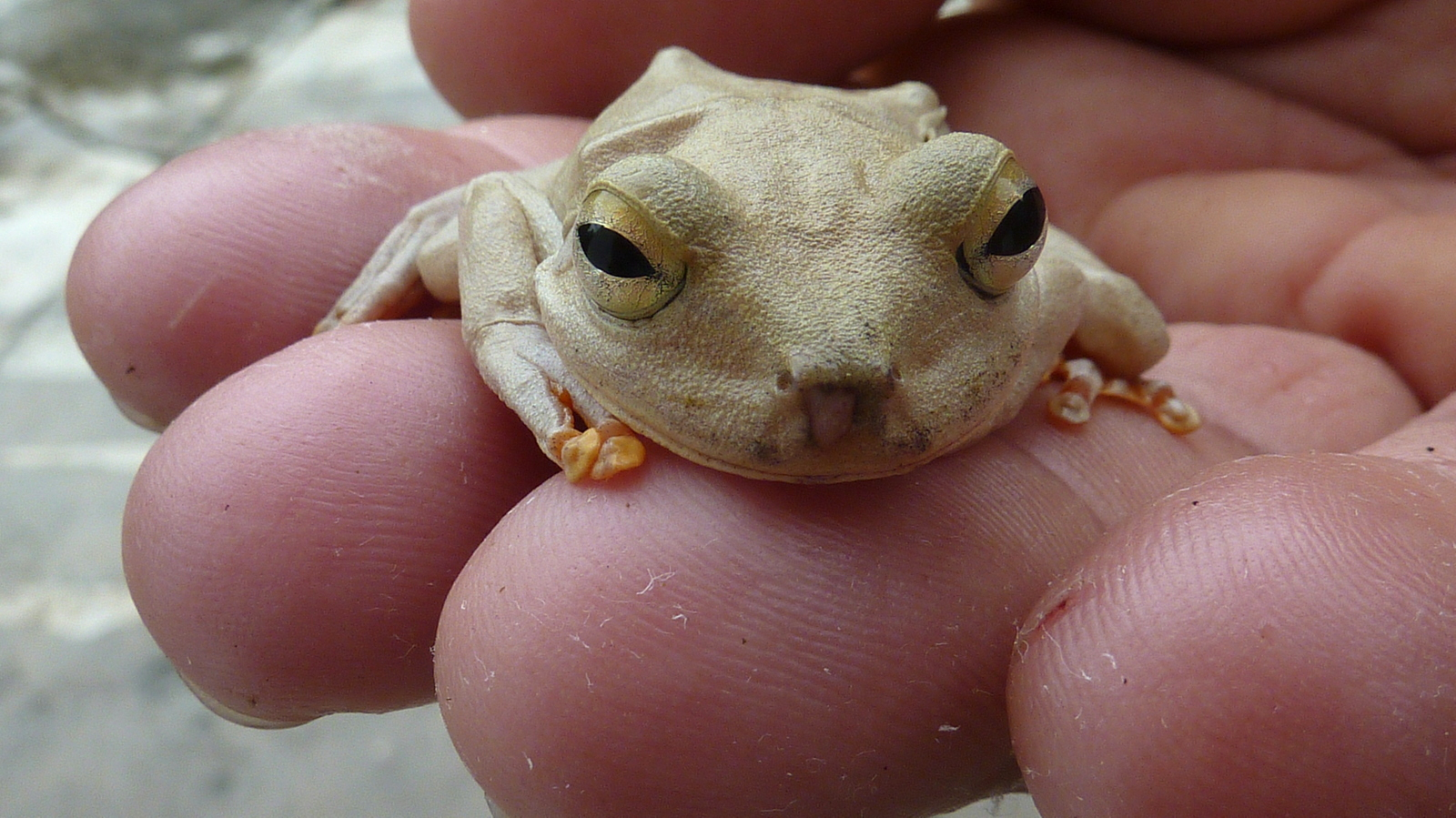
Emerald-eyed tree frog (Hypsiboas crepitans)

Many species of flora and fauna have been registered in the Lebrija River basin. A total number of 761 species of which 172 birds, 77 insects, 124 mammals, 104 fish and 284 plant species have been noted at Rionegro, Santander. The Cerulean Warbler Bird Reserve is close to the Lebrija River in Bucaramanga.

==== Flora ====
The following species and genera are noted in the upper part of the Lebrija River: Ocotea sp., Miconia sp., Guarea grandifolia, Hedyosmum bomplandianum, Guateria sp., Protium sp., Ochroma sp., Piper sp., Trema micrantha, Vismia baccifera, Urera caracasana, Cecropia sp. and Croton leptostachis.

==== Fauna ====
===== Mammals =====
The following mammals have been registered in the upper and central Lebrija River basins:

Name	Species	Image
Venezuelan red howler	Alouatta seniculus	
gray-handed night monkey	Aotus griseimembra	
white-fronted capuchin	Cebus albifrons	
oncilla	Leopardus pardalis	
southern tamandua	Tamandua tetradactyla	
northern tamandua	Tamandua mexicana	
silky anteater	Cyclopes didactylus	
Brazilian porcupine	Coendou prehensilis	
crab-eating fox	Cerdocyon thous	
crab-eating raccoon	Procyon cancrivorus	
collared peccary	Pecari tajacu	
red brocket	Mazama americana	
red-tailed squirrel	Sciurus granatensis	
brown-throated sloth	Bradypus variegatus	
Linnaeus's two-toed sloth	Choloepus didactylus	
Hoffmann's two-toed sloth	Choloepus hoffmanni	
tapeti	Sylvilagus brasiliensis	
eastern cottontail	Sylvilagus floridanus	
common opossum	Didelphis marsupialis	
brown four-eyed opossum	Metachirus nudicaudatus	
sepia short-tailed opossum	Monodelphis adusta	
mountain paca	Agouti paca	
lowland paca	Cuniculus paca	
black agouti	Dasyprocta fuliginosa	
Central American agouti	Dasyprocta punctata	
kinkajou	Potos flavus	
tayra	Eira barbara	
long-tailed weasel	Mustela frenata	
striped hog-nosed skunk	Conepatus semistriatus	
neotropical otter	Lontra longicaudis	
nine-banded armadillo	Dasypus novemcinctus	
northern naked-tailed armadillo	Cabassous centralis	
dusky rice rat	Melanomys caliginosus	
Jamaican fruit bat	Artibeus jamaicensis	
pygmy fruit-eating bat	Artibeus phaeotis	
silky short-tailed bat	Carollia brevicauda	
Seba's short-tailed bat	Carollia perspicillata	
common vampire bat	Desmodus rotundus	
common big-eared bat	Micronycteris microtis	
Heller's broad-nosed bat	Platyrrhinus helleri	
greater sac-winged bat	Saccopteryx bilineata	
little yellow-shouldered bat	Sturnira lilium	
great fruit-eating bat	Artibeus lituratus	
chestnut short-tailed bat	Carollia castanea	
Thomas's shaggy bat	Centronycteris centralis	
Godman's long-tailed bat	Choeroniscus godmani	
northern ghost bat	Diclidurus albus	
black myotis	Myotis nigricans	

===== Amphibians and reptiles =====
The following species have been registered in the central Lebrija River basin:

Name	Species	Image
palm rocket frog	Rheobates palmatus	
robber frog	Craugastor raniformis	
emerald-eyed tree frog	Hypsiboas crepitans	
yellow treefrog	Dendropsophus microcephalus	
Fleischmann's glass frog	Hyalinobatrachium fleischmanni	
yellow-striped poison frog	Dendrobates truncatus	
South American common toad	Rhinella margaritifera	
	Dendropsophus subocularis	
	Pristimantis miyatai	
	Rulyrana adiazeta	
	Allobates niputidea	
fer-de-lance	Bothrops asper	
blunthead tree snake	Imantodes cenchoa	
red-nape snake	Ninia atrata	
yellow-bellied snake	Coniophanes fissidens	
	Micrurus dumerilii	
turnip-tailed gecko	Thecadactylus rapicauda	
	Polychrus marmoratus	
	Anolis frenatus	
	Anolis sulcifrons	
	Lepidoblepharis xanthostigma	
	Sphaerodactylus heliconiae	

===== Birds =====
The following species have been registered in the central Lebrija River basin:

Name	Species	Image
rufous-tailed hummingbird	Amazilia tzacatl	
orange-billed sparrow	Arremon aurantiirostris	
bright-rumped attila	Attila spadiceus	
rufous-capped warbler	Basileuterus rufifrons	
orange-chinned parakeet	Brotogeris jugularis	
cattle egret	Bubulcus ibis	
great black hawk	Buteogallus urubitinga	
Muscovy duck	Cairina moschata	
bicolored wren	Campylorhynchus griseus	
turkey vulture	Cathartes aura	
grey-cheeked thrush	Catharus minimus	
golden-headed manakin	Ceratopipra erythrocephala	
dusky antbird	Cercomacra tyrannina	
green kingfisher	Chloroceryle americana	
green honeycreeper	Chlorophanes spiza	
blue-tailed emerald	Chlorostilbon mellisugus	
bananaquit	Coereba flaveola	
spot-breasted woodpecker	Colaptes punctigula	
crested bobwhite	Colinus cristatus	
ruddy ground dove	Columbina talpacoti	
black vulture	Coragyps atratus	
white-bibbed manakin	Corapipo leucorrhoa	
smooth-billed ani	Crotophaga ani	
little tinamou	Crypturellus soui	
green jay	Cyanocorax yncas	
rufous-browed peppershrike	Cyclarhis gujanensis	
black-faced dacnis	Dacnis lineata	
violet-bellied hummingbird	Damophila julie	
plain-brown woodcreeper	Dendrocincla fuliginosa	
straight-billed woodcreeper	Dendroplex picus	
yellow-bellied elaenia	Elaenia flavogaster	
mountain elaenia	Elaenia frantzii	
white-tailed kite	Elanus leucurus	
checker-throated stipplethroat	Epinecrophylla fulviventris	
thick-billed euphonia	Euphonia laniirostris	
white-necked jacobin	Florisuga mellivora	
spectacled parrotlet	Forpus conspicillatus	
white-tailed hawk	Geranoaetus albicaudatus	
wedge-billed woodcreeper	Glyphorynchus spirurus	
white-breasted wood wren	Henicorhina leucosticta	
scrub greenlet	Hylophilus flavipes	
yellow-backed oriole	Icterus chrysater	
Euler's flycatcher	Lathrotriccus euleri	
white-tipped dove	Leptotila verreauxi	
striped manakin	Machaeropterus regulus	
white-bearded manakin	Manacus manacus	
boat-billed flycatcher	Megarhynchus pitangua	
tropical screech owl	Megascops choliba	
red-crowned woodpecker	Melanerpes rubricapillus	
southern nightingale-wren	Microcerculus marginatus	
yellow-headed caracara	Milvago chimachima	
tropical mockingbird	Mimus gilvus	
ochre-bellied flycatcher	Mionectes oleagineus	
buff-rumped warbler	Myiothlypis fulvicauda	
rusty-margined flycatcher	Myiozetetes cayanensis	
pauraque	Nyctidromus albicollis	
Colombian chachalaca	Ortalis columbiana	
chestnut-bellied seed finch	Oryzoborus angolensis	
cinereous becard	Pachyramphus rufus	
band-tailed pigeon	Patagioenas fasciata	
pale-bellied hermit	Phaethornis anthophilus	
green hermit	Phaethornis guy	
stripe-throated hermit	Phaethornis striigularis	
olivaceous piculet	Picumnus olivaceus	
great kiskadee	Pitangus sulphuratus	
slaty-headed tody-flycatcher	Poecilotriccus sylvia	
spectacled owl	Pulsatrix perspicillata	
blue-and-white swallow	Pygochelidon cyanoleuca	
vermilion flycatcher	Pyrocephalus rubinus	
flame-rumped tanager	Ramphocelus flammigerus	
crimson-backed tanager	Ramphocelus dimidiatus	
roadside hawk	Rupornis magnirostris	
olive-grey saltator	Saltator olivascens	
buff-throated saltator	Saltator maximus	
streaked saltator	Saltator striatipectus	
black phoebe	Sayornis nigricans	
saffron finch	Sicalis flaveola	
Lesson's seedeater	Sporophila bouvronides	
plumbeous seedeater	Sporophila plumbea	
ruddy-breasted seedeater	Sporophila minuta	
yellow-bellied seedeater	Sporophila nigricollis	
southern rough-winged swallow	Stelgidopteryx ruficollis	
chestnut-collared swift	Streptoprocne rutila	
white-winged swallow	Tachycineta albiventer	
white-shouldered tanager	Tachyphonus luctuosus	
blue-necked tanager	Tangara cyanicollis	
bay-headed tanager	Tangara gyrola	
black-capped tanager	Tangara heinei	
scrub tanager	Tangara vitriolina	
barred antshrike	Thamnophilus doliatus	
blue-grey tanager	Thraupis episcopus	
palm tanager	Thraupis palmarum	
band-tailed barbthroat	Threnetes ruckeri	
sooty grassquit	Tiaris fuliginosus	
fasciated tiger heron	Tigrisoma fasciatum	
common tody-flycatcher	Todirostrum cinereum	
house wren	Troglodytes aedon	
black-billed thrush	Turdus ignobilis	
pale-breasted thrush	Turdus leucomelas	
tropical kingbird	Tyrannus melancholicus	
red-eyed vireo	Vireo olivaceus	
blue-black grassquit	Volatinia jacarina	
plain xenops	Xenops minutus	
eared dove	Zenaida auriculata	
jet antbird	Cercomacra nigricans	
sooty ant tanager	Habia gutturalis	
sooty-headed wren	Pheugopedius spadix	
brown-winged schiffornis	Schiffornis turdina	
northern slaty antshrike	Thamnophilus punctatus	

===== Fish =====
The following species have been registered in the central Lebrija River basin:

Name	Species	Image
guppy	Poecilia reticulata	
redhump eartheater	Geophagus steindachneri	
wolf fish	Hoplias malabaricus	
	Prochilodus magdalenae	
	Sturisomatichthys leightoni	
Cauca molly	Poecilia caucana	
	Astroblepus homodon	
	Leporinus muyscorum	
	Ancistrus caucanus	
	Astynax magdalenae	
	Brycon henni	
	Chaetostoma fischeri	
	Chaetostoma milesi	
	Gephyrocharax melanocheir	
	Hemibrycon dentatus	
	Hypostomus hondae	
	Ichthyoelephas longirostris	
	Parodon magdalenensis	
	Pimelodus blochii	
	Pimelodus grosskopfii	
	Rhamdia quelen	
	Roeboides dayii	
	Salminus affinis	

== Trivia ==
- In 1898, Princess Theresa of Bavaria made the first reported finding of an egg of the Magdalena River turtle (Podocnemis lewyana) near the Lebrija River

== See also ==
List of rivers of Colombia
Suárez River
Chicamocha River, Sogamoso River
