= Lebrija (disambiguation) =

Lebrija may refer to:

== Geography ==
- Lebrija, municipality in Andalusia, Spain
  - Lebrija (wine), a Spanish wine region in Andalusia
- Lebrija, Santander, municipality in Santander, Colombia
- Lebrija River, river in Santander

== People ==
- Antonio de Nebrija or Lebrija (1444-1522), Spanish humanist, astronomer, poet and linguïst
- Antonio de Lebrija (1507-1540), Spanish conquistador in Colombia, possible grandson of the former
- Francisca de Lebrija, Spanish lecturer
- Miguel Lebrija (1887-1913), Mexican aviator
