= Orejuela =

Orejuela is a surname. Notable people with the surname include:

- Antonio Orejuela (born 1960), Spanish footballer
- Carlos Orejuela (born 1980), Peruvian footballer
- Carlos Alfredo Orejuela Quiñónez (born 1993), Ecuadorian footballer
- Diego Orejuela (born 1962), Spanish footballer
- Gilberto Rodríguez Orejuela (born 1939), Colombian drug lord
- Eduardo Orejuela (born 1952), Ecuadorian swimmer
- Jefferson Orejuela (born 1993), Ecuadorian footballer
- Luis Manuel Orejuela (born 1995), Colombian footballer
- Miguel Rodríguez Orejuela (born 1943), Colombian drug lord
- Tamara Orejuela (born 1953), Ecuadorian swimmer
- Yuri Alvear Orejuela (born 1986), Colombian judoka

== See also ==
- Orjuela, another spelling of it
- Sachatamia orejuela, is a species of frog in the family Centrolenidae
