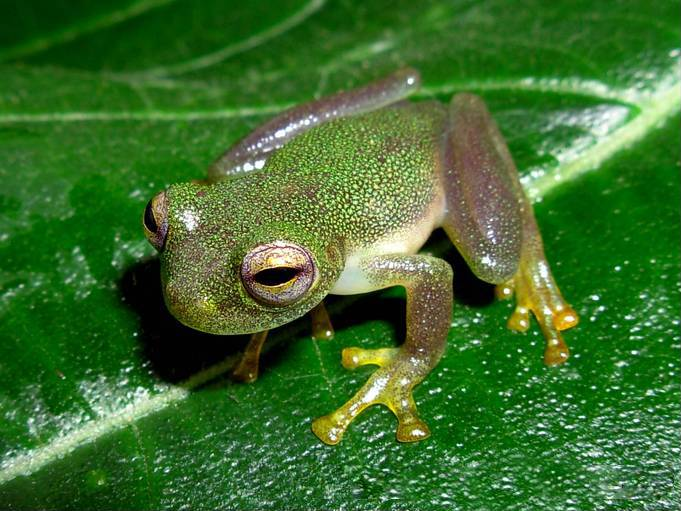
- Rulyrana susatamai

Scientific classification
- Kingdom: Animalia
- Phylum: Chordata
- Class: Amphibia
- Order: Anura
- Family: Centrolenidae
- Subfamily: Centroleninae
- Genus: Rulyrana; Guayasamin, Castroviejo-Fisher, Trueb, Ayarzagüena, Rada, and Vilà, 2009

Type species
- Centrolenella flavopunctata Lynch and Duellman, 1973

Species
- 6 species (see text)

= Rulyrana =

Genus of amphibians

Rulyrana is a small genus of glass frogs. They are found in South America, on the Amazonian slopes of the Andes in Ecuador, Peru, and possibly Bolivia, as well as on the eastern slopes of the Cordillera Central and the western slopes of the Cordillera Oriental in Colombia.

== Etymology ==
The generic name Rulyrana honors Pedro Ruiz-Carranza and John D. Lynch who have "contributed enormously to the understanding of centrolenid diversity, biology, and evolution". The name is made up from the two first letters of their surnames in combination with rana for frog. In addition, "Ruly" is the nickname of Martín Bustamante, who has also contributed to amphibian conservation.

== Description ==
Rulyrana have moderate to extensive webbing between the third and fourth fingers. The dorsum is lavender in preserved individuals and may have spots. Internal features include green bones (in live specimens), lobed liver that is covered by a transparent hepatic peritoneum, whereas the ventral parietal peritoneum is white in its anterior part and transparent in its poster part. The digestive tract is translucent. In terms of osteology, Rulyrana have dentigerous process in the vomer and—usually—vomerine teeth. The humeral spines are not present.

While distinct from most other glass frogs, there are no characters that could unambiguously place a species in Rulyrana or in the genus Sachatamia; genetic data are needed for an unambiguous allocation. The two genera, however, have largely disjunct distribution areas (Rulyrana are found in the Amazon Basin and the Colombian Cordillera Central while Sachatamia are not found further east than the Colombian Cordillera Central).

== Reproduction ==
The males call while sitting on upper sides of leaves or rocks. The eggs are deposited on leaves or rocks.

== Species ==
There are six species:

- Rulyrana adiazeta (Ruiz-Carranza and Lynch, 1991)
- Rulyrana flavopunctata (Lynch and Duellman, 1973)
- Rulyrana mcdiarmidi (Cisneros-Heredia, Venegas, Rada, and Schulte, 2008)
- Rulyrana saxiscandens (Duellman and Schulte, 1993)
- Rulyrana spiculata (Duellman, 1976)
- Rulyrana susatamai (Ruiz-Carranza and Lynch, 1995)

The AmphibiaWeb includes also Sachatamia orejuela in this genus.
