= Orjuela =

Orjuela is a Colombian surname of Basque origins that may refer to

- Angie Orjuela (born 1989), Colombian long-distance runner
- Arabelly Orjuela (born 1988), Colombian race walker
- Fernando Orjuela (born 1991), Colombian cyclist
- Hernán Orjuela (born 1957), Colombian television presenter

== See also ==
- Orejuela
