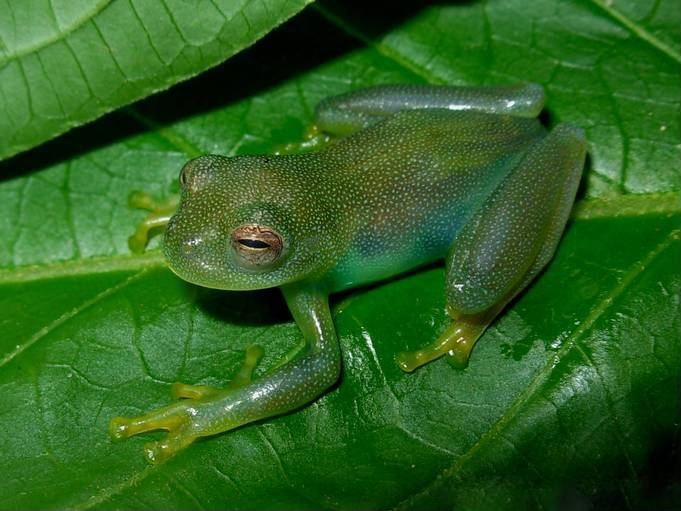

Conservation status
- Near Threatened (IUCN 3.1)

Scientific classification
- Kingdom: Animalia
- Phylum: Chordata
- Class: Amphibia
- Order: Anura
- Family: Centrolenidae
- Genus: Rulyrana
- Species: R. susatamai

Binomial name
- Rulyrana susatamai Ruiz-Carranza and Lynch, 1995

Synonyms
- Cochranella susatamai Ruiz-Carranza and Lynch, 1995

= Rulyrana susatamai =

Species of frog

Rulyrana susatamai is a species of frog in the family Centrolenidae. It is endemic to the eastern flank of the Cordillera Central, Colombia, in the departments of Antioquia, Caldas, Huila, and Tolima.

== Habitat and conservation ==
Its natural habitats are sub-Andean forests and laurel forests where it is found on vegetation along streams at elevations of 400–1,650 m (1,310–5,410 ft) above sea level. The eggs are laid on leaves overhanging the stream, to which the tadpoles drop upon hatching.

Rulyrana susatamai is a common species. However, it requires gallery forest and is sensitive to habitat disturbance. It is threatened by habitat loss and fragmentation.

The frog's range includes at least one protected park, including the Ranita Dorada Amphibian Reserve.
