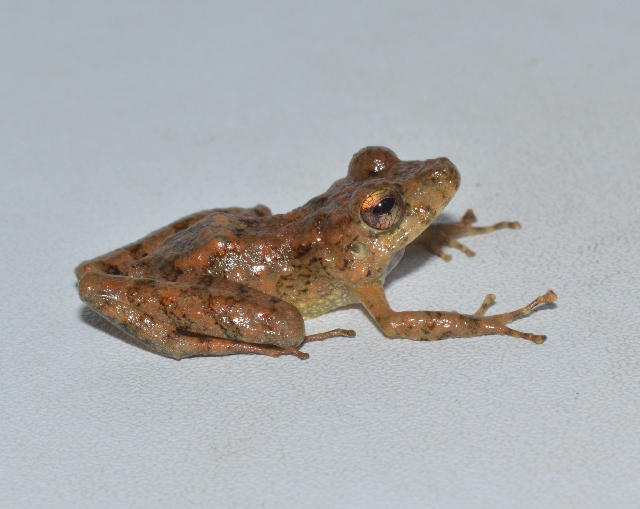

Conservation status
- Vulnerable (IUCN 3.1)

Scientific classification
- Kingdom: Animalia
- Phylum: Chordata
- Class: Amphibia
- Order: Anura
- Clade: Brachycephaloidea
- Family: Craugastoridae
- Genus: Pristimantis
- Species: P. fallax

Binomial name
- Pristimantis fallax (Lynch & Rueda, 1999)

Synonyms
- Eleutherodactylus fallax Lynch & Rueda, 1999

= Pristimantis fallax =

Species of frog

Pristimantis fallax is a species of frog in the family Strabomantidae. It is endemic to Colombia. Its natural habitats are tropical moist montane forests and rivers. It is threatened by habitat loss.

The frog's range includes at least one protected park, including the Ranita Dorada Amphibian Reserve.
