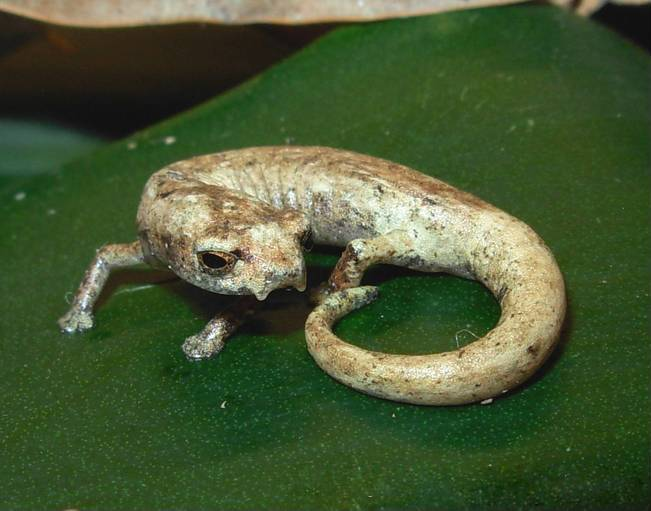

Conservation status
- Least Concern (IUCN 3.1)

Scientific classification
- Kingdom: Animalia
- Phylum: Chordata
- Class: Amphibia
- Order: Urodela
- Family: Plethodontidae
- Genus: Bolitoglossa
- Species: B. lozanoi

Binomial name
- Bolitoglossa lozanoi Acosta-Galvis & Restrepo, 2001

= Lozano's salamander =

Species of amphibian

Lozano's salamander or the Rioi La Miel mushroomtongue salamander (Bolitoglossa lozanoi) is a species of salamander in the family Plethodontidae. It is endemic to Colombia.

== Description ==
The adult salamander is large, measuring 5.8 cm in snout-vent length. Its tail is longer than its body, and its snout is round and more pronounced in the adult male. Its eyes are large but not protruding. The skin of the dorsum is light coffee-brown in color with some black speckles. The skin of the ventral surfaces is brown with some cream and dark brown marks.

== Habitat ==
This animal is nocturnal and arboreal. It lives in wet forests near streams. It can live in secondary forest and other disturbed areas. This animal has been observed between 145 and 1200 meters above sea level.

== Reproduction ==
This salamander breeds through direct development with no free-swimming larval stage.

== Threats ==
The IUCN classifies this animal as least concern of extinction. What threat it faces comes from habitat loss in favor of livestock cultivation and agriculture, including illegal crops. The type locality has since been converted to a site for a hydroelectric dam, and other damming projects have flooded portions of the salamander's former range.

The frog's range includes several protected parks: Reserva Natural Privada Riomanso, Serrania de los Yariguies Integrated Management Regional District, Ranita Dorada ProAves Reserve, and Parque Nacional Natural Selva Florencia.
