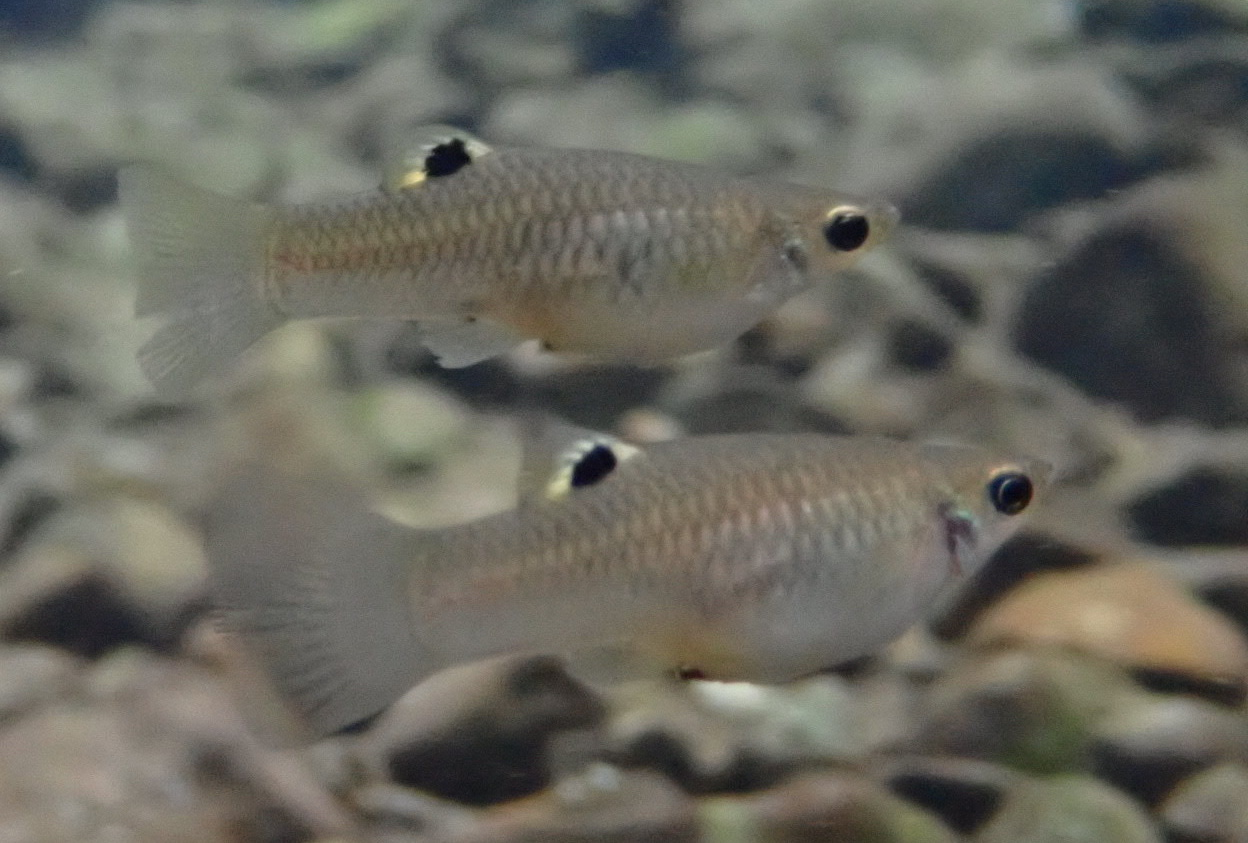

Scientific classification
- Kingdom: Animalia
- Phylum: Chordata
- Class: Actinopterygii
- Order: Cyprinodontiformes
- Family: Poeciliidae
- Genus: Poecilia
- Species: P. caucana

Binomial name
- Poecilia caucana Steindachner, 1880

Synonyms
- Girardinus caucanus Steindachner, 1880; Allopoecilia caucana (Steindachner, 1880); Mollienesia caucana (Steindachner, 1880)

= Cauca molly =

Species of fish

The Cauca molly (Poecilia caucana) is a freshwater fish in the family Poeciliidae. This fish is found in Panama, Venezuela, and Colombia, where it lives in shallow waters in the basins of the Lebrija, Magdalena, Cauca and other rivers. P. caucana eats mosquito larvae and algae.

== Description ==
The male Poecilia caucana grows to a length of 3 cm (1.2 in) while the female can attain 6 cm (2.4 in). Generally silvery in colour, this fish can be identified by the black blotch at the base of the dorsal fin. Some specimens show some degree of narrow transverse banding, but this may be the lingering remains of colour changes associated with breeding.

== Distribution and habitat ==
P. caucana is native to freshwater systems in tropical Central and South America. Its range extends from the east-flowing rivers of Panama to the Cauca River in Colombia. Its range also includes the Catatumbo River in northern Colombia, and Lake Maracaibo in Venezuela into which it flows. This fish is a very tolerant species, able to withstand considerable variations in temperature and salinity, as well as low levels of oxygen.

== Ecology ==
An omnivore, P. caucana feeds on algae, on mosquito larvae and on insects that fall onto the water surface. Proposals have been made to use this species, as well as the closely related guppy (Poecilia reticulata), in biological pest control of mosquitoes. The Cauca molly is a livebearer; the female produces a batch of ten to twenty-five live young after a gestation period of about four weeks.

== Use in aquaria ==
This fish is sometimes kept in aquaria. It does best at temperatures of between 27 and 29 °C (80.6 and 84.2 °F) in well-aerated conditions at a pH of 7.0 to 7.5.
