= Rulyrana spiculata =

Conservation status
- Near Threatened (IUCN 3.1)

Scientific classification
- Kingdom: Animalia
- Phylum: Chordata
- Class: Amphibia
- Order: Anura
- Family: Centrolenidae
- Genus: Rulyrana
- Species: R. spiculata

Binomial name
- Rulyrana spiculata (Duellman, 1976)

Synonyms
- Centrolenella spiculata Duellman, 1976; Cochranella spiculata (Duellman, 1976)

Species of frog

Rulyrana spiculata is a species of frog in the family Centrolenidae. It is endemic to the eastern slopes of Andes in central and southern Peru and northern Bolivia. Common name Cuzco Cochran frog has been coined for it.

== Description ==
Adult males measure 21–23 mm (0.83–0.91 in) and females 24–28 mm (0.94–1.10 in) in snout–vent length. The snout is rounded. The hands and feet are partly webbed. Both the finger and toe tips have discs, those on the fingers are relatively large. The dorsum is dark green while the venter is aquamarine. The tips of the digits are yellowish green, and margin of the upper lip is greenish white. The iris is dull bronze with fine, black reticulations. Dorsal skin is smooth but bears many minute, white spicules, which have given the species its specific name spiculata.

== Habitat and conservation ==
Its natural habitats are montane primary and secondary tropical forest at elevations of 1,200–1,700 m (3,900–5,600 ft) above sea level. It typically occurs close to streams. Males call at night adjacent to small streams. The eggs are laid on leaves, and upon hatching, the tadpoles fall in to the stream.

It is locally threatened by habitat loss caused by increasing agricultural activities and human settlements.
