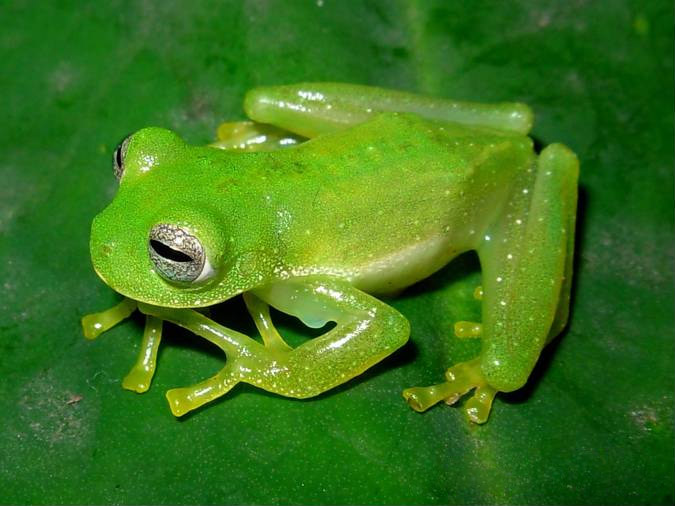

Conservation status
- Least Concern (IUCN 3.1)

Scientific classification
- Kingdom: Animalia
- Phylum: Chordata
- Class: Amphibia
- Order: Anura
- Family: Centrolenidae
- Genus: "Centrolene"
- Species: "C." robledoi

Binomial name
- "Centrolene" robledoi Ruíz-Carranza & Lynch, 1995

= "Centrolene" robledoi =

Species of frog

"Centrolene" robledoi is a species of frog in the family Centrolenidae. It is endemic to Colombia. Its natural habitats are subtropical or tropical moist lowland forests, subtropical or tropical moist montane forests, and rivers. It is threatened by habitat loss.

The frog's range includes at least one protected park, including the Ranita Dorada Amphibian Reserve.
