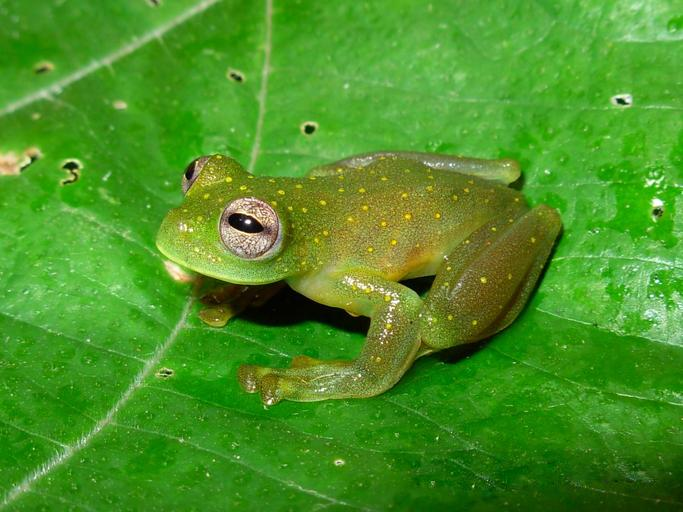

Conservation status
- Vulnerable (IUCN 3.1)

Scientific classification
- Kingdom: Animalia
- Phylum: Chordata
- Class: Amphibia
- Order: Anura
- Family: Centrolenidae
- Genus: Sachatamia
- Species: S. punctulata

Binomial name
- Sachatamia punctulata (Ruiz-Carranza and Lynch, 1995)

Synonyms
- Cochranella punctulata Ruiz-Carranza and Lynch, 1995

= Sachatamia punctulata =

Species of frog

Sachatamia punctulata is a species of frog in the family Centrolenidae. It is endemic to the Cordillera Central, Colombia, in the departments of Antioquia, Caldas, and Tolima. Its natural habitats are tropical humid and sub-Andean forests along streams at elevations of 360–1,100 m (1,180–3,610 ft) above sea level. It is restricted to forest remnants that are surrounded by inhospitable agricultural habitat matrix. As a result, it is threatened by habitat loss and fragmentation. The frog's range includes at least one protected park, including the Ranita Dorada Amphibian Reserve.
