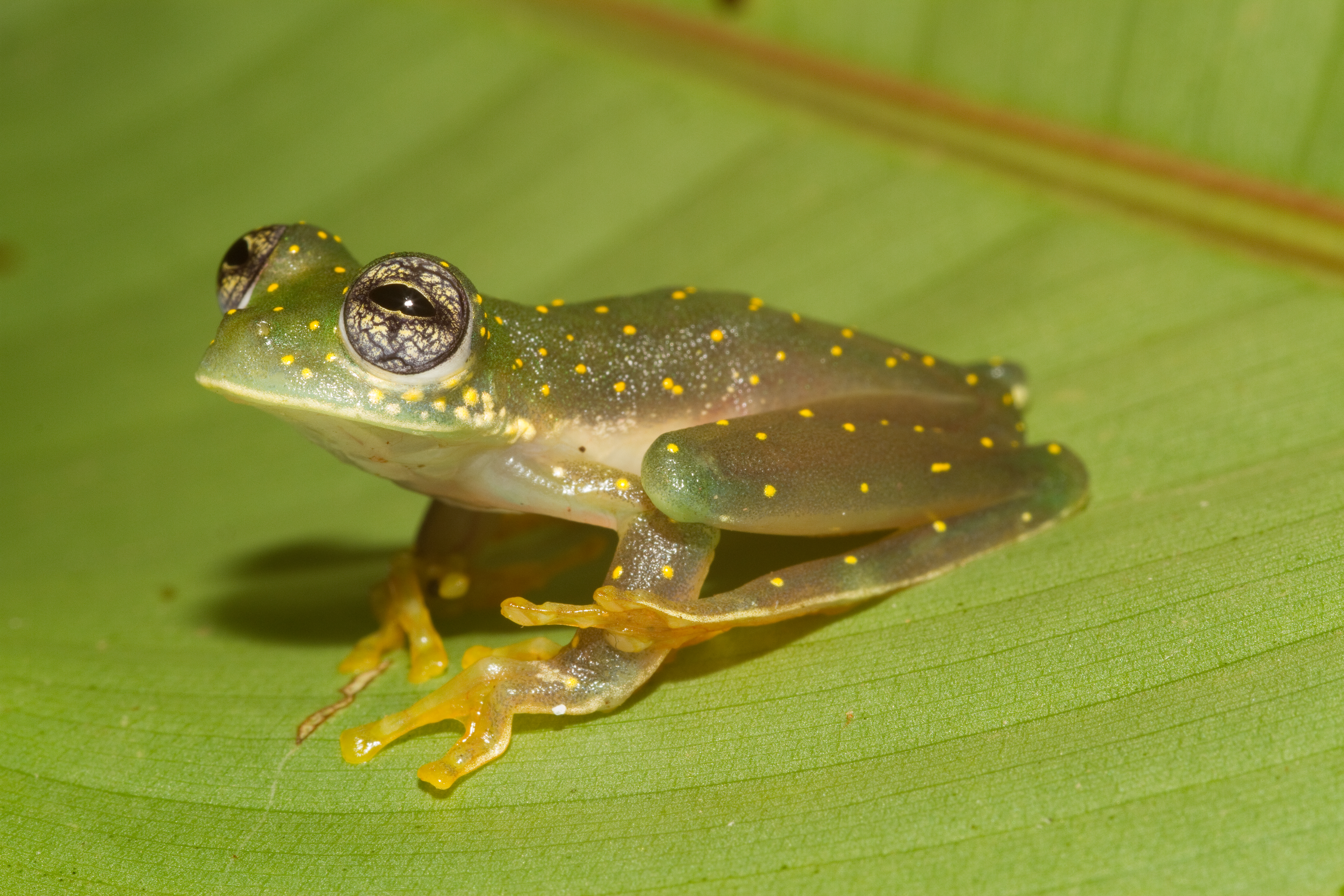

Conservation status
- Least Concern (IUCN 3.1)

Scientific classification
- Kingdom: Animalia
- Phylum: Chordata
- Class: Amphibia
- Order: Anura
- Family: Centrolenidae
- Genus: Sachatamia
- Species: S. albomaculata

Binomial name
- Sachatamia albomaculata (Taylor, 1949)

Synonyms
- Centrolenella albomaculata Taylor, 1949; Cochranella albomaculata (Taylor, 1949)

= Sachatamia albomaculata =

Species of frog

Sachatamia albomaculata is a species of frog in the family Centrolenidae. It is found in Honduras, Costa Rica, Panama, western Colombia, and northwestern Ecuador. Its natural habitats are humid lowland and premontane forest from sea level to about 1,500 m (4,900 ft) above sea level. It typically occurs in bushes and trees along forest streams, but populations can persist even along streams in pastures with minimal riparian growth. It is a common species that can locally be threatened by habitat loss but is not facing major threats as a species.
