= Rulyrana flavopunctata =

Conservation status
- Least Concern (IUCN 3.1)

Scientific classification
- Kingdom: Animalia
- Phylum: Chordata
- Class: Amphibia
- Order: Anura
- Family: Centrolenidae
- Genus: Rulyrana
- Species: R. flavopunctata

Binomial name
- Rulyrana flavopunctata (Lynch and Duellman, 1973)

Synonyms
- Centrolenella flavopunctata Lynch and Duellman, 1973; Cochranella flavopunctata (Lynch and Duellman, 1973)

Species of frog

Rulyrana flavopunctata is a species of frog in the family Centrolenidae. It is found on the eastern slopes of the Cordillera Oriental in Colombia (Casanare, Boyacá, Caquetá, and Meta Departments) and on the eastern slopes of the Andes in Ecuador. Common name yellow-spotted Cochran frog has been coined for it.

== Etymology ==
The specific name flavopunctata is derived from the Latin flavus (=golden) and punctatus (=dotted), and refers to the dorsal coloration of this species.

== Description ==
Adult males measure 21–23 mm (0.83–0.91 in) and females 24–26 mm (0.94–1.02 in) in snout–vent length. The snout is short and round. The eyes are relatively large. The tympanum is visible. Both fingers and toes are webbed. The dorsum is shagreened in texture and pale green in color, with numerous minute yellow flecks. The edge of the upper lip is pale yellow The fingers and toes are yellow whereas the chest is white.

== Habitat and conservation ==
Its natural habitats primary and secondary cloud forests at elevations of 70–1,715 m (230–5,627 ft) above sea level. It is usually found along streams. Breeding takes place in permanent streams.

Rulyrana flavopunctata is a common forest species, although it can locally be threatened by habitat destruction and pollution. It is known from several protected areas.
