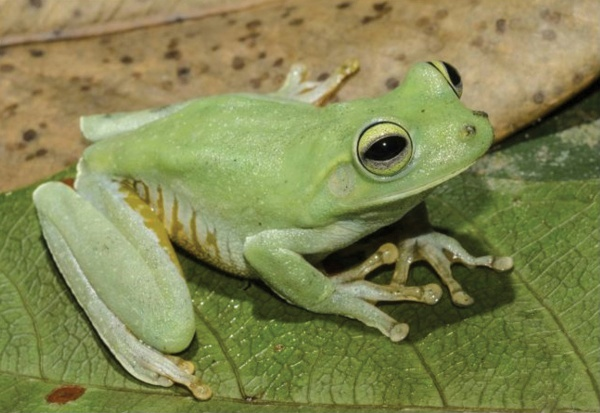

Conservation status
- Least Concern (IUCN 3.1)

Scientific classification
- Kingdom: Animalia
- Phylum: Chordata
- Class: Amphibia
- Order: Anura
- Family: Hylidae
- Genus: Boana
- Species: B. xerophylla

Binomial name
- Boana xerophylla (Duméril & Bibron, 1841)

Synonyms
- Hyla xerophylla Duméril & Bibron, 1841; Hyla fuentei Goin & Goin, 1968; Boana fuentei (Goin & Goin, 1968); Hypsiboas fuentei (Goin & Goin, 1968)

= Boana xerophylla =

Species of amphibian

Boana xerophylla is a species of frog in the family Hylidae. It is found in northern Brazil, French Guiana, Guyana, Suriname, and Venezuela south of the Orinoco.

== Taxonomy ==
Boana xerophylla was described in 1841 as Hyla xerophylla. However, for decades in the 1900s, it was regarded as a synonym of Boana crepitans, until it was resurrected as a separate species in 2017. In 2021, the Boana xerophylla populations north of the Orinoco river were separated as a new species, Boana platanera. A population from Suriname has sometimes been called Boana fuentei, but it's currently classified as a synonym of Boana xerophylla.

== Description ==
The dorsal coloration of Boana xerophylla ranges from dark brown to green. It's average snout–vent length is 49.69 millimetres (1.96 in).
