= Pristimantis penelopus =

Conservation status
- Least Concern (IUCN 3.1)

Scientific classification
- Kingdom: Animalia
- Phylum: Chordata
- Class: Amphibia
- Order: Anura
- Clade: Brachycephaloidea
- Family: Craugastoridae
- Genus: Pristimantis
- Species: P. penelopus

Binomial name
- Pristimantis penelopus (Lynch & Rueda, 1999)

Synonyms
- Eleutherodactylus penelopus Lynch & Rueda, 1999

Species of frog

Pristimantis penelopus is a species of frog in the family Strabomantidae. It is endemic to Colombia. Its natural habitats are tropical moist montane forests and rivers. It is threatened by habitat loss. Habitat loss includes cutting down trees and wildfires.

The frog's range includes at least one protected park, including the Ranita Dorada Amphibian Reserve.
