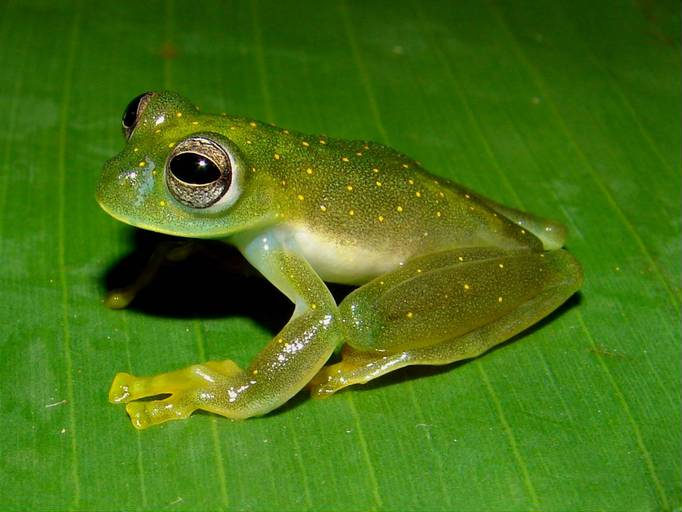
- Sachatamia punctulata

Scientific classification
- Kingdom: Animalia
- Phylum: Chordata
- Class: Amphibia
- Order: Anura
- Family: Centrolenidae
- Subfamily: Centroleninae
- Genus: Sachatamia; Guayasamin, Castroviejo-Fisher, Trueb, Ayarzagüena, Rada, and Vilà, 2009

Type species
- Centrolenella albomaculata Taylor, 1949

Species
- 4 species (see text)

= Sachatamia =

Genus of amphibians

Sachatamia is a small genus of glass frogs. They are found in Central America (Honduras, Nicaragua, Costa Rica, Panama) and northern South America (Colombia and northwestern Ecuador) at altitudes below 1,500 m (4,900 ft) above sea level.

The generic name Sachatamia is derived from the Quichua words sacha for "forest" and tamia for "rain". This is a reference to the tropical rainforest habitat of these frogs. Sachatamia inhabit rainforests. The males call while sitting on leaves or rocks. The pigmented eggs are deposited on leaves or rocks.

== Description ==
Sachatamia have moderate to extensive webbing between third and fourth fingers. The dorsum is lavender in preserved individuals and may have spots. Internal features include green bones (in live specimens), lobed liver that is covered by a transparent hepatic peritoneum, whereas the ventral parietal peritoneum is white in its anterior part and transparent in its poster part. The digestive tract is translucent. In terms of osteology, Sachatamia possess vomerine teeth and quadratojugal bone that is articulating with maxilla. The humeral spines are present in adult males of some of the species.

While distinct from most other glass frogs, there are no characters that could unambiguously place a species in Sachatamia or in the genus Rulyrana; genetic data are needed for an unambiguous allocation. The two genera, however, have disjunct distribution areas (Rulyrana are found in the Amazon Basin while Sachatamia are not found further east than the Colombian Cordillera Central).

== Species ==
There are four species:

- Sachatamia albomaculata (Taylor, 1949)
- Sachatamia electrops (Rada, Jeckel, Caorsi, Barrientos, Rivera-Correa, and Grant, 2017)
- Sachatamia ilex (Savage, 1967)
- Sachatamia orejuela (Duellman and Burrowes, 1989)
- Sachatamia punctulata (Ruiz-Carranza and Lynch, 1995)

The AmphibiaWeb places Sachatamia orejuela in the genus Rulyrana.
