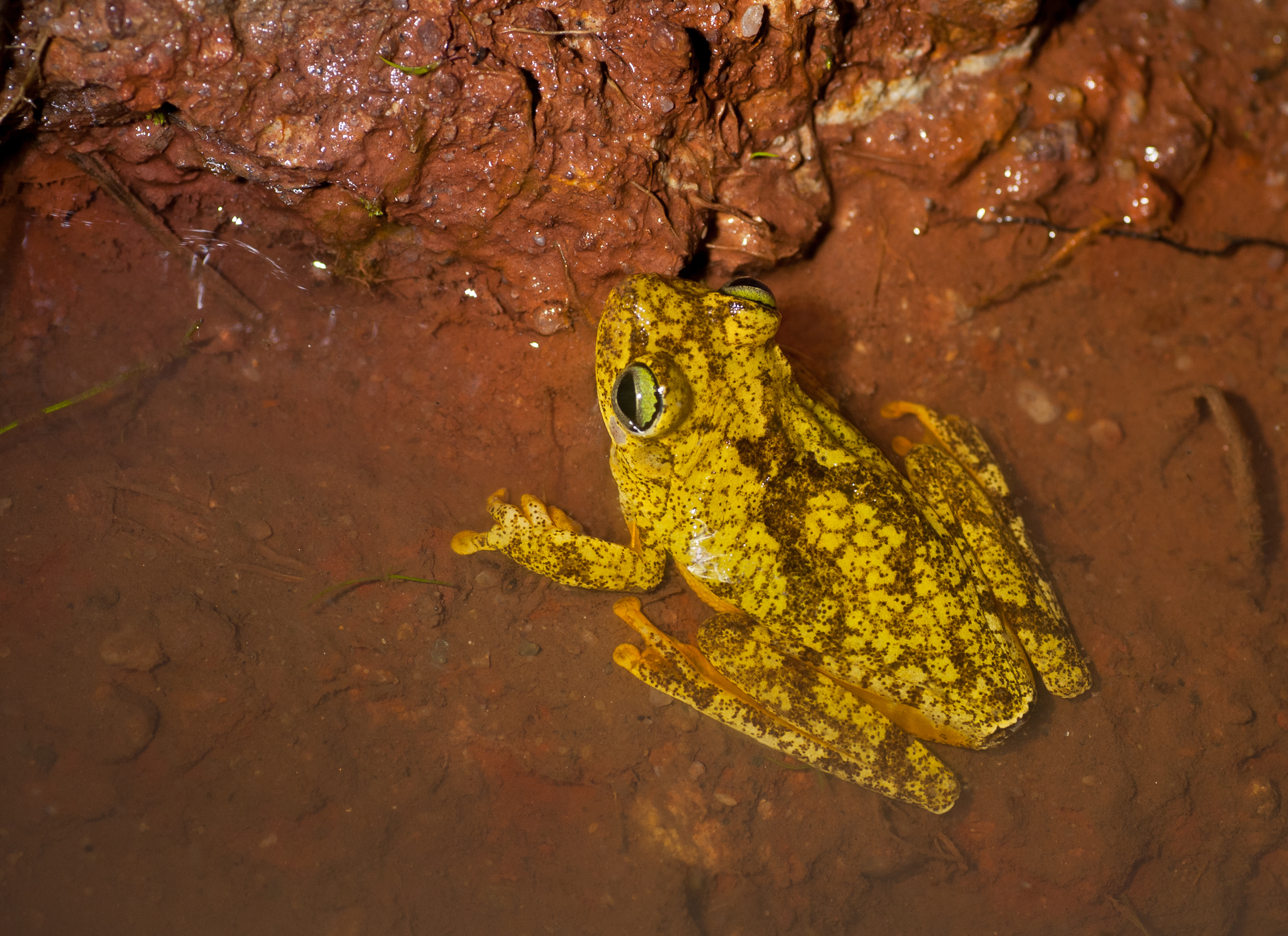

Conservation status
- Least Concern (IUCN 3.1)

Scientific classification
- Kingdom: Animalia
- Phylum: Chordata
- Class: Amphibia
- Order: Anura
- Family: Hylidae
- Genus: Boana
- Species: B. platanera

Binomial name
- Boana platanera Escalona Sulbarán et al., 2021

= Boana platanera =

Species of tree frog

Boana platanera, commonly known as the banana tree dwelling frog, is a species of tree frog in the family Hylidae. It is distributed within Venezuela, Colombia, Panama, and Trinidad and Tobago. Boana platanera was described in 2021, and individuals of the species were previously classified as Boana crepitans or Boana xerophylla.

== Etymology ==
In Colombia and Venezuela, Boana platanera is, together with Boana pugnax, known by the Spanish name rana platanera. The specific name platanera was borrowed from this colloquial name, and it can be translated as "from the plantain". This refers to the banana trees on which these frogs are often seen in the daytime. Rana platanera can thus be translated as "banana tree dwelling frog", which is the English name suggested by the describers.

== Taxonomy ==
Boana platanera is the sister species of Boana xerophylla, from which it was separated in 2021. Both species are present in Venezuela, but Boana platanera lives north of the Orinoco river and Boana xerophylla south of the river. This classification is fairly recent, as Boana xerophylla was resurrected in 2017 and Boana platanera was described in 2021. For decades prior to the resurrection, both species were widely classified as Boana crepitans, a species now recognized as endemic to Brazil.

== Description ==
During the daytime, when Boana platanera is usually inactive, the frog has a pale cream coloration. However, during the night, the coloration is more variable, ranging from yellow to tan and light brown. The night coloration also has more or less well-defined brown markings, which can be irregular or in the shape of an X. Boana platanera is sexually dimorphic, with females being larger than males. The average snout–vent length of females is 63.1 millimetres (2.5 in), compared to the 54.3 millimetres (2.1 in) of males. The advertisement call of Boana platanera is complex and composed of around five notes. The duration of the call is 200−451 milliseconds.

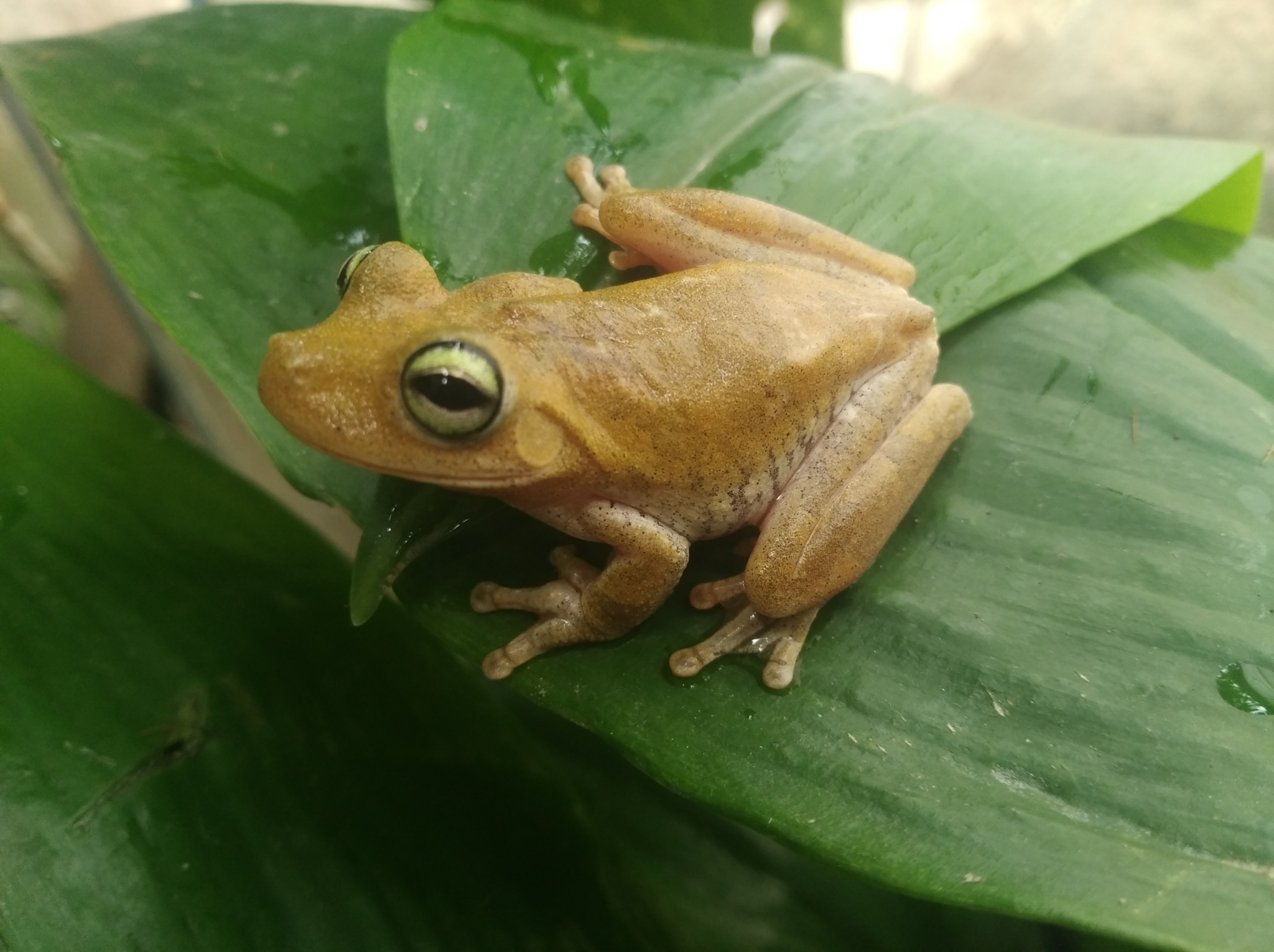
Day coloration

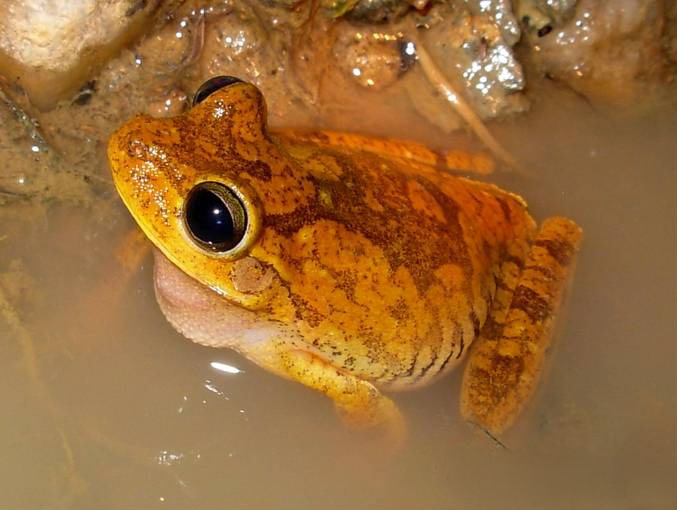
Night coloration

== Distribution ==
The distribution range of Boana platanera encompasses parts of Venezuela, Colombia, Panama, and Trinidad and Tobago. It's widely distributed in Venezuela, but only north of the Orinoco river, which separates it geographically from Boana xerophylla. A sympatric species sometimes confused with Boana platanera is Boana pugnax.

In addition to its wide geographical distribution, Boana platanera is also found in a wide range of elevations. It has been recorded from sea level to altitudes of 2,450 metres (8,038 ft). Boana platanera can also live in many different habitats, including anthropic environments.

== Threats ==
The IUCN classifies this frog as least concern of extinction due to its large range, presumed large and stable population, and ability to live in many different types of habitats. It does face some localized threat from conversion of its habitat to other purposes, such as cattle grazing, agriculture, urbanization, illegal mining, legal coal, oil, and petroleum extraction, and pollution from these efforts.

Many frog surveys showed no evidence of Batrachochytrium dendrobatidis or chytridiomycosis in this species, but a 2008 survey showed 1 out of 20 specimens infected, and a 2017 survey showed 6 of 50 specimens infected. A 2010 study by Márquez et al. showed that the frogs can recover from infection, even at temperatures believed to be ideal for B. dendrobatidis growth.
