= Ranita Dorada Reserve =

Wildlife preserve in Colombia

Ranita Dorada Amphibian Reserve
- IUCN category VI (protected area with sustainable use of natural resources)
- Interactive map of Ranita Dorada Amphibian Reserve
- Location: Colombia; Tolima
- Nearest city: Frias
- Coordinates: 5°01′S 75°02′W
- Area: 1.14931 km^{2} (0.44 sq mi)
- Established: 2008

The Ranita Dorada Reserve, Ranita Dorada Amphibian Reserve, or Reserva Ranita Dorada is a wildlife preserve in Colombia's Tolima district. It is a small patch of cloud forest.

== History ==
IUCN Netherlands, Dendrobatidae Nederland, and Conservation International and Netherlands Postcode Lottery established the reserve in 2008. Its purpose was to preserve two species of poison dart frog, Andinobates dorisswansonae and Andinobates tolimense, but many other vulnerable, endangered, and common animals also live there.

== Resident species ==
Many plants and animals live in the reserve, for example birds, mammals, snakes, and frogs.

Residents of the reserve include the following:

- Cochranella rosada
- Cochranella susatamai
- Cochranella punctulata
- Centrolene prosoblepon
- Centrolene robledoi
- Bolitoglossa lozanoi
- Eleutherodactylus fallax
- Eleutherodactylus penelopus
- Eleutherodactylus raniformis

== Location ==
This reserve is located in Tolima, Colombia between 1580 and 1900 meters above sea level. It is 284 acres in size. It is classified as a lower montane wet forest, or cloud forest. The annual rainfall ranges between 2,000 and 2,500 mm per annum and the temperature between 15 and 22 °C.
