= Rulyrana adiazeta =

Conservation status
- Vulnerable (IUCN 3.1)

Scientific classification
- Kingdom: Animalia
- Phylum: Chordata
- Class: Amphibia
- Order: Anura
- Family: Centrolenidae
- Genus: Rulyrana
- Species: R. adiazeta

Binomial name
- Rulyrana adiazeta (Ruíz-Carranza and Lynch, 1991)

Synonyms
- Cochranella adiazeta Ruiz-Carranza and Lynch, 1991

Species of frog

Rulyrana adiazeta is a species of frog in the family Centrolenidae. It is endemic to the western slopes of the Cordillera Oriental, Colombia, in the departments of Cundinamarca, Santander, and Tolima.

Its natural habitats are pre-montane and montane forests at elevations of 1,120–2,060 m (3,670–6,760 ft) above sea level. It occurs on vegetation next to streams. It is a common species but is locally suffering from habitat loss caused by agricultural expansion.
