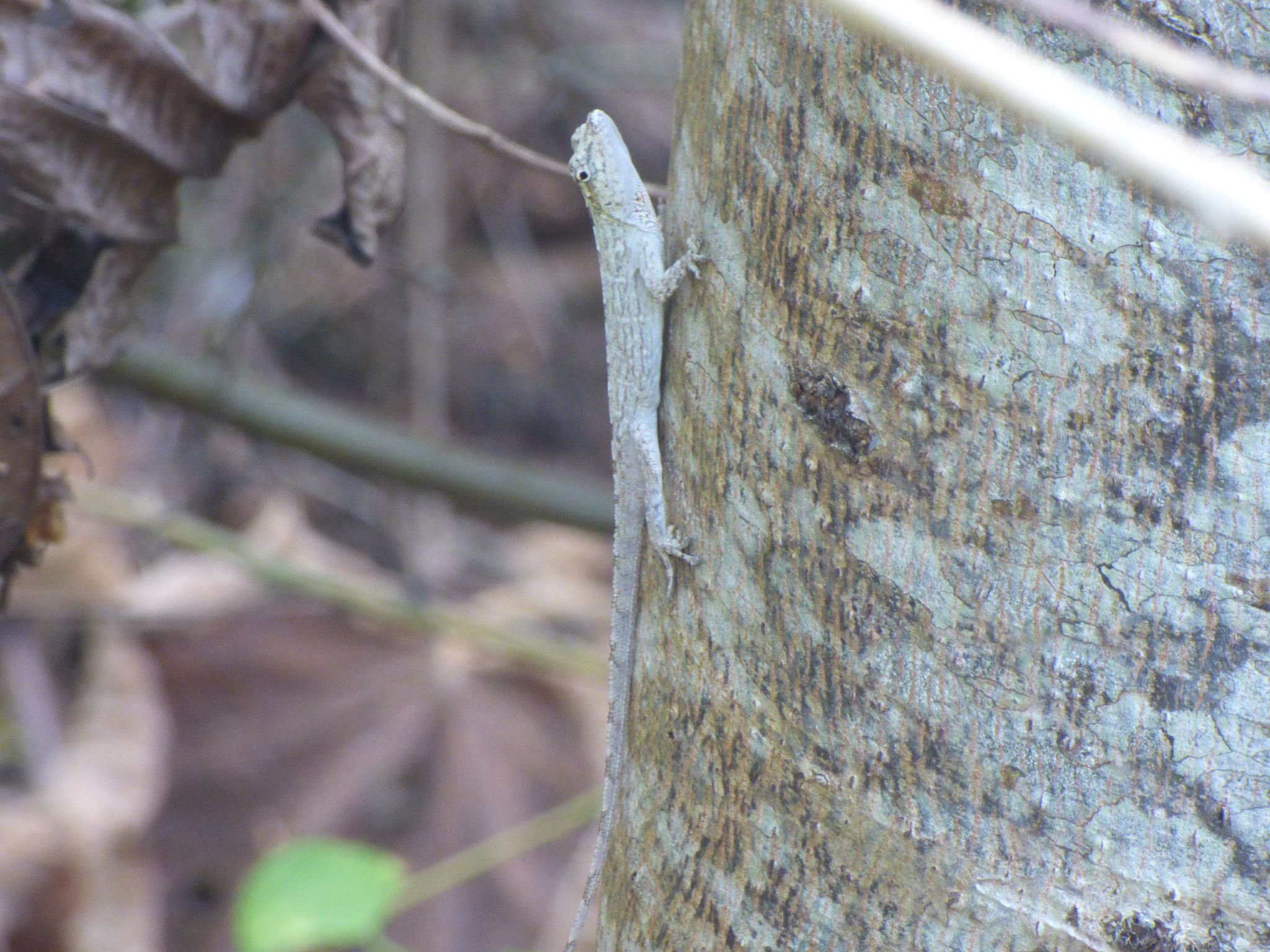

Scientific classification
- Kingdom: Animalia
- Phylum: Chordata
- Class: Reptilia
- Order: Squamata
- Suborder: Iguania
- Family: Dactyloidae
- Genus: Anolis
- Species: A. sulcifrons

Binomial name
- Anolis sulcifrons Cope, 1899

= Anolis sulcifrons =

Species of lizard

Anolis sulcifrons, the grooved anole, is a species of lizard in the family Dactyloidae. The species is found in Colombia.
