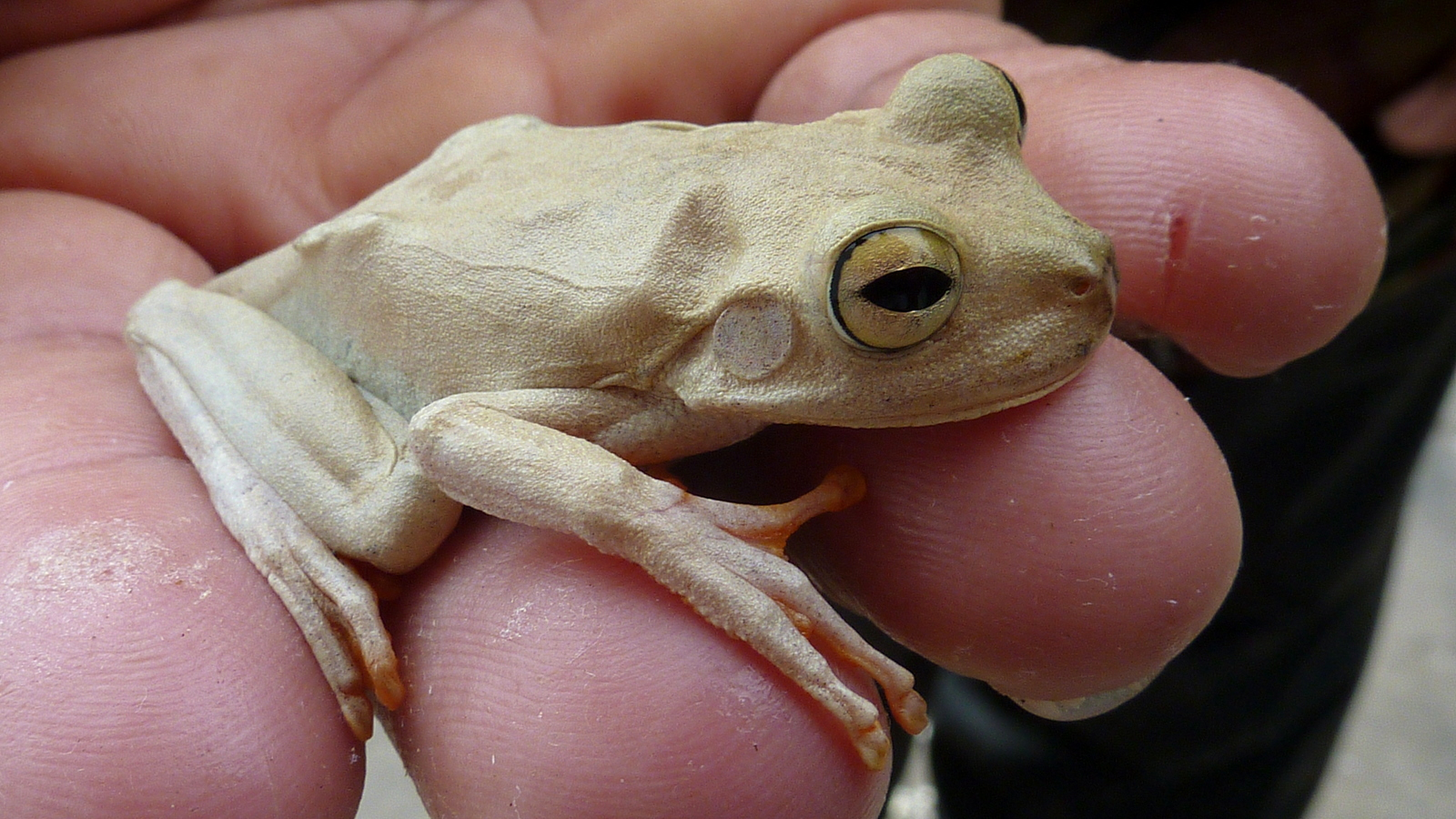

Conservation status
- Least Concern (IUCN 3.1)

Scientific classification
- Kingdom: Animalia
- Phylum: Chordata
- Class: Amphibia
- Order: Anura
- Family: Hylidae
- Genus: Boana
- Species: B. crepitans

Binomial name
- Boana crepitans (Wied-Neuwied, 1824)

Synonyms
- Hypsiboas crepitans (Wied-Neuwied, 1824)

= Emerald-eyed tree frog =

Species of amphibian

The emerald-eyed tree frog (Boana crepitans) is a species of frog in the family Hylidae. It is largely restricted to the Atlantic Forest region of Brazil although it is found in the Aquicuana Reserve in Bolivia. Some populations previously regarded as Boana crepitans have been separated into the species Boana xerophylla and Boana platanera.

== Description ==
The emerald-eyed tree frog varies in coloration, being either green, tan, or reddish-brown, and has long, slender arms and legs. The common name of these frogs stems from their metallic green iris. Males are smaller than females and have a dagger-like spine at the base of their thumb.

== Behavior ==
Emerald-eyed tree frogs are nocturnal and feed during the night, mostly feeding at the edges of ponds and rivers along with in shrubs and trees. Their diet consists of small insects such as crickets and flies. These frogs are arboreal, and they use the shade from leaves during the day to protect themselves from the sun, alongside using leaves as camouflage to protect themselves from predators. Like all frogs, Emerald-eyed treefrogs have a distinctive call that they use to communicate with other frogs and to find mates. The call of the Emerald-eyed tree frog is described as rattle-like, and consists of short low and medium pitch notes.

== Reproduction ==
Emerald-eyed treefrog breeding occurs mostly throughout the rainy season, with male frogs calling female frogs from the edges of flooded grasses or temporary ponds created by rain. Females can lay over 1,000 eggs at once, which will float at the top of the water for 24 hours before sinking.

Emerald-eyed tree frog tadpoles are light brown or grey with long, slightly yellow tails. It takes these tadpoles 3 months to metamorphosize, and no parental care is given to them.
