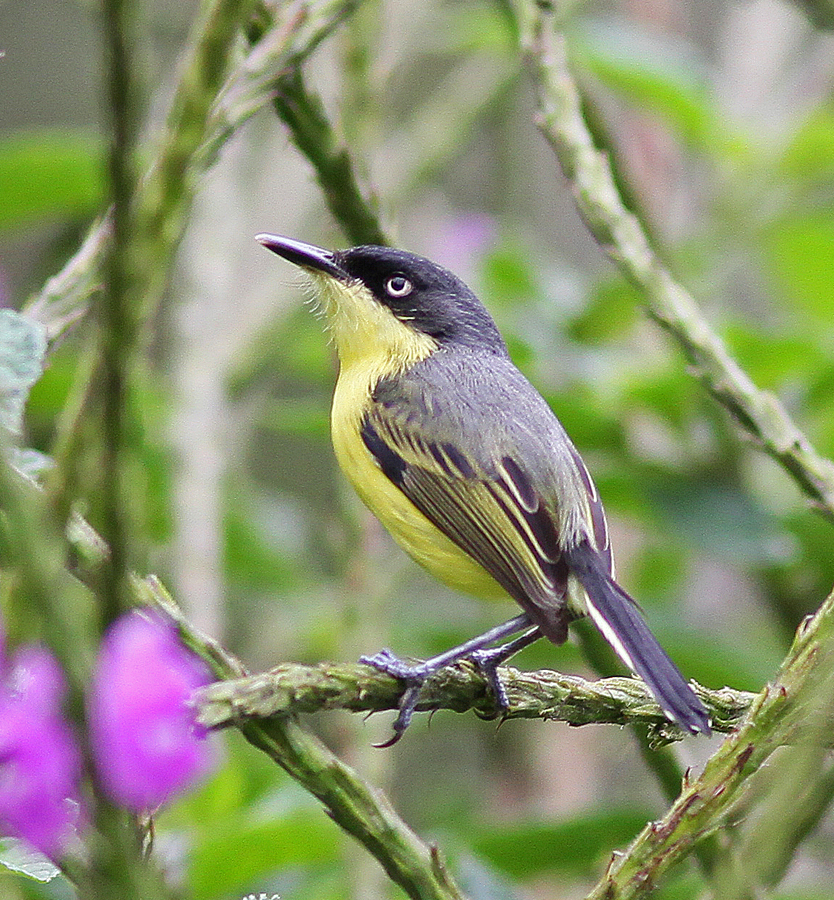
- In Costa Rica

Conservation status
- Least Concern (IUCN 3.1)

Scientific classification
- Kingdom: Animalia
- Phylum: Chordata
- Class: Aves
- Order: Passeriformes
- Family: Tyrannidae
- Genus: Todirostrum
- Species: T. cinereum

Binomial name
- Todirostrum cinereum (Linnaeus, 1766)

= Common tody-flycatcher =

Species of bird

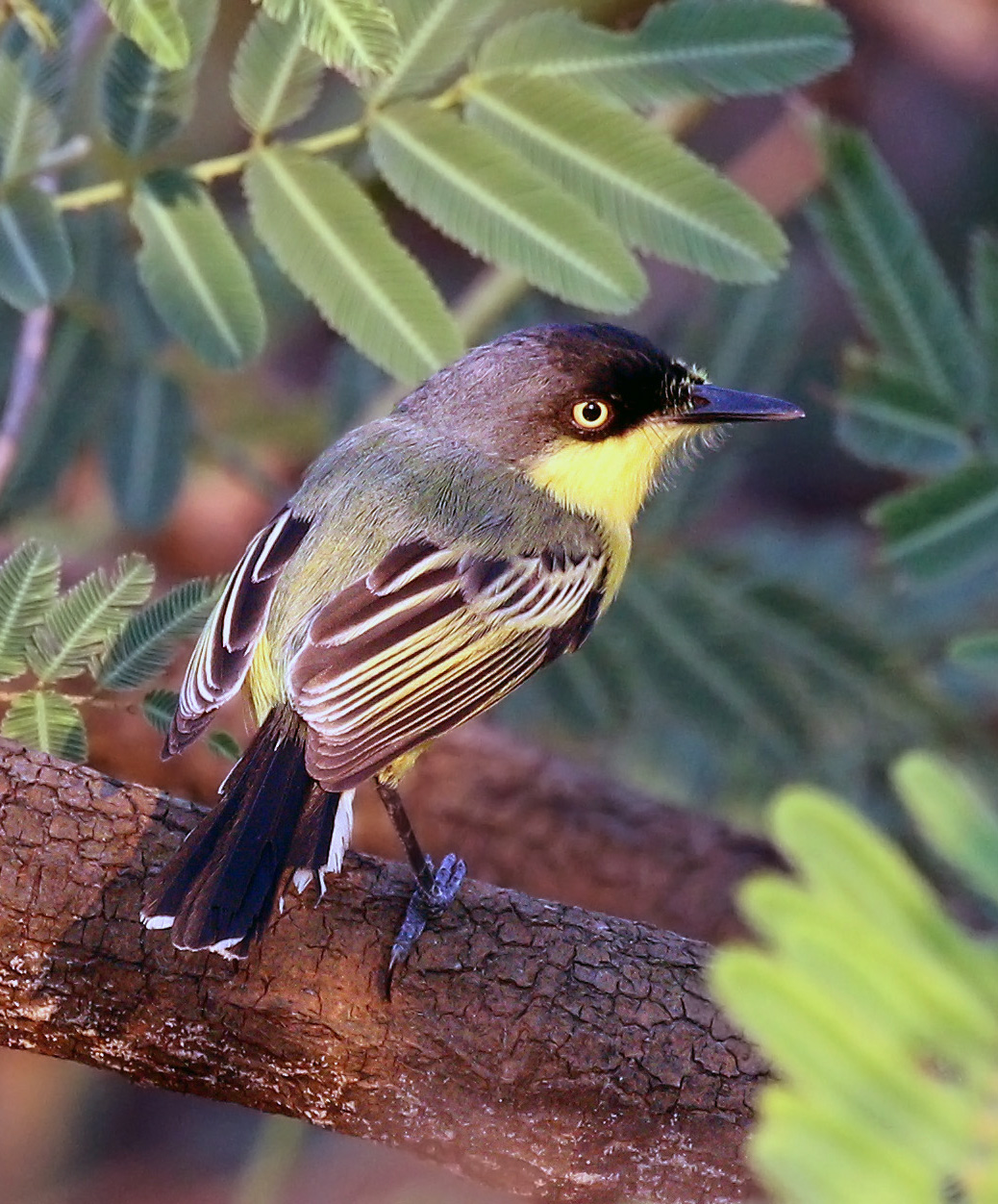
In the Pantanal, Brazil

The common tody-flycatcher (Todirostrum cinereum) is a small passerine bird in the family Tyrannidae, the tyrant flycatchers. It is found in Mexico, in every Central American country, and in every mainland South American country except Chile and Uruguay.

== Taxonomy and systematics ==
The common tody-flycatcher was formally described by the Swedish naturalist Carl Linnaeus in 1766 in the twelfth edition of his Systema Naturae under the binomial name Todus cinereus. Linnaeus based his description on the "Grey and Yellow Fly-catcher" that had been described and illustrated in 1760 by George Edwards from a specimen collected in Suriname. The specific epithet cinereum is from Latin cinereus meaning "ash-grey". The common tody-flycatcher is now the type species of the genus Todirostrum that was introduced by René Lesson in 1831.

Eight subspecies are recognized:

- T. c. virididorsale Parkes, 1976
- T. c. finitimum Bangs, 1904
- T. c. wetmorei Parkes, 1976
- T. c. sclateri (Cabanis & Heine, 1860)
- T. c. cinereum (Linnaeus, 1766)
- T. c. peruanum Zimmer, JT, 1930
- T. c. coloreum Ridgway, 1906
- T. c. cearae Cory, 1916

The Clements taxonomy partially separates T. c. sclateri as "common tody-flycatcher (sclateri) within the species; the other seven subspecies are the "common tody-flycatcher (cinereum group)".

== Description ==
The common tody-flycatcher is a tiny, big-headed bird, 8.8 to 10.2 cm (3.5 to 4.0 in) long, weighing 4 to 8 g (0.14 to 0.28 oz), and with a long, flattened, straight bill. Adult males of the nominate subspecies T. c. cinereum have a glossy black forecrown and a slate-gray hindcrown and nape. Their lores and the area around their eyes are glossy black. Their upper back is slate-gray that becomes dark olive all the way to the uppertail coverts. Their wings are black with yellow edges on the flight feathers and yellow edges and tips on the coverts; the last show as two wing bars. Their tail is black with white tips on the outer feathers. Their entire underparts are bright yellow. They have an all-black maxilla and a black mandible with a pinkish white base. Adult females have a grayer head than males and an entirely pinkish white mandible. Both sexes have a yellowish to white iris and bluish gray legs and feet. Juveniles have dark gray crown and cheeks, a buffy tinge to the wings' yellow parts, a dark iris, and paler yellow underparts than adults.

The other subspecies of the common tody-flycatcher differ from the nominate and each other thus:

- T. c. virididorsale: brighter green upperparts than nominate
- T. c. finitimum: grayish (somewhat slaty) green upperparts
- T. c. wetmorei: brighter green upperparts than nominate
- T. c. sclateri: white throat and sometimes a dark iris
- T. c. peruanum: like nominate but with a dark iris
- T. c. coloreum: paler gray nape and more olive upperparts than nominate
- T. c. cearae: paler gray nape and more olive upperparts than nominate

== Distribution and habitat ==
The common tody-flycatcher is found from Mexico to northern Argentina and southern Brazil, though its range does not include most of the Amazon Basin. The subspecies are found thus:

- T. c. virididorsale: central Veracruz and adjacent northern Oaxaca in southern Mexico
- T. c. finitimum: from southern Veracruz, Chiapas, Tabasco, and the Yucatán Peninsula in southern Mexico south on both the Caribbean and Pacific slopes to northwestern Costa Rica
- T. c. wetmorei: central and eastern Costa Rica and Panama; Coiba Island off Panama's Pacific coast
- T. c. sclateri: from Cauca and Nariño departments in southwestern Colombia south through western Ecuador to Lambayeque Department in far northwestern Peru
- T. c. cinereum: Colombia's three Andean ranges (except in the southwest) and from Meta Department north and east across northern Venezuela except its far northwest, the Guianas, and northeastern Brazil from eastern Roraima to the Atlantic in Amapá
- T. c. peruanum: eastern Ecuador and south in eastern Peru to Cuzco Department
- T. c. coloreum: northern Bolivia, northern Paraguay, far northeastern Argentina's Misiones Province, and southeastern Brazil roughly bounded by southern Mato Grosso, Espírito Santo, and Santa Catarina states
- T. c. cearae: eastern Brazil roughly bounded by Pará, Alagoas, and northern Bahia

The common tody-flycatcher inhabits a wide variety of open and semi-open landscapes including secondary forest, forest edges, mangroves, riverine belts, open woodlands and groves, plantations and orchards, restinga, thickets in savanna, overgrown clearings and pastures, agricultural areas, and gardens. It shuns dense forest. In elevation it ranges from sea level to 1,100 m (3,610 ft) in northern Central America and 1,600 m (5,250 ft) in Costa Rica. It reaches 2,200 m (7,220 ft) in Colombia and 1,500 m (4,920 ft) in western Ecuador. It ranges between 400 and 1,900 m (1,310 and 6,230 ft) in eastern Ecuador and 600 and 1,200 m (1,970 and 3,940 ft) in Peru. In Venezuela it reaches 1,650 m (5,400 ft) north of the Orinoco River and 1,300 m (4,270 ft) south of it. In Brazil it ranges from sea level to 2,000 m (6,560 ft).

== Behavior ==
=== Movement ===
The common tody-flycatcher is believed to be a year-round resident.

=== Feeding ===
The common tody-flycatcher feeds on a wide variety of arthropods and also includes fruit in its diet. It typically forages in pairs or in small family groups, though sometimes singly, and rarely joins mixed-species feeding flocks. It mostly forages in dense vegetation near the ground but sometimes ascends as high as the canopy where the forest is most open. It primarily takes prey from foliage by gleaning while perched and with short upward and outward sallies from a perch. It occasionally captures prey in mid-air. It forages very actively, hopping sideways along branches with its tail cocked and wagging. A study in Brazil showed that there it took almost all of its prey from live leaves by using strikes from a sally and hover-gleaning about equally.

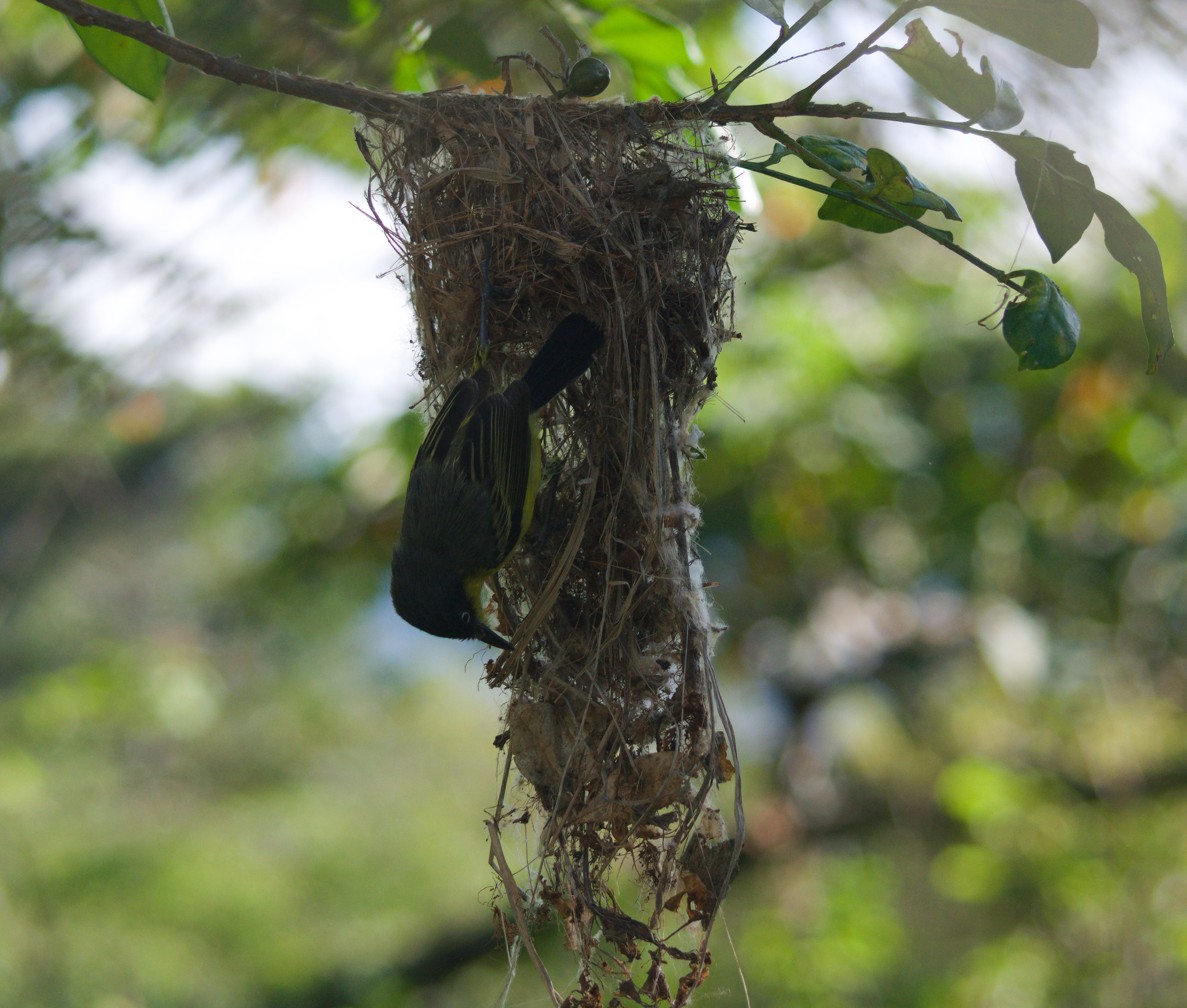
A common tody-flycatcher building its hanging nest.

=== Breeding ===
The common tody-flycatcher's breeding season varies geographically but overall is between December and October. Both sexes build the nest, a messy pouch with a side entrance under a "visor". It is made from grasses, other plant fibers, and moss bound with spider web and lined with fine grass, feathers, or seed down. Often fibers hang messily from the nest's bottom. It is typically suspended from a branch between about 1 and 5 m (3 and 16 ft) above the ground, sometimes near a wasp nest. Nests have also been recorded as high as 30 m (100 ft) and have been see hanging from utility wires. The usual clutch is two or three eggs which the female alone incubates. The incubation period is about 18 days and fledging occurs about 17 to 18 days after hatch. Both parents provision nestlings and fledglings.

=== Vocal and non-vocal sounds ===
The common tody-flycatcher's vocalizations include a "series of low, short, dry 'trrr-trrr' trills, a variety of high/very high, single, double, and triple 'tic' notes and [an] extr. high 'weet-widiwi' (last part as almost-trill)". The 'tic' notes can be "repeated up to 110 times per minute at dawn during [the] nesting season". Prey capture is accompanied by an audible bill snap.

== Status ==
The IUCN has assessed the common tody-flycatcher as being of Least Concern. It has an extremely large range; its estimated population of at least five million mature individuals is believed to be stable. No immediate threats have been identified. It occurs in many protected areas both public and private and "[s]urvives well in converted and secondary habitats; benefits from deforestation, spreading into clearings and plantations, where it is usually common". It is considered fairly common to common in northern Central America, common in most of Costa Rica though less so in the far northwest, "generally numerous" in Ecuador, and common in Colombia, Peru, Venezuela, and Brazil.
