= Striped manakin =

Striped manakin refers to birds that are now recognized as two distinct species:

- Kinglet manakin (Machaeropterus regulus)
- Striolated manakin (Machaeropterus striolatus)
