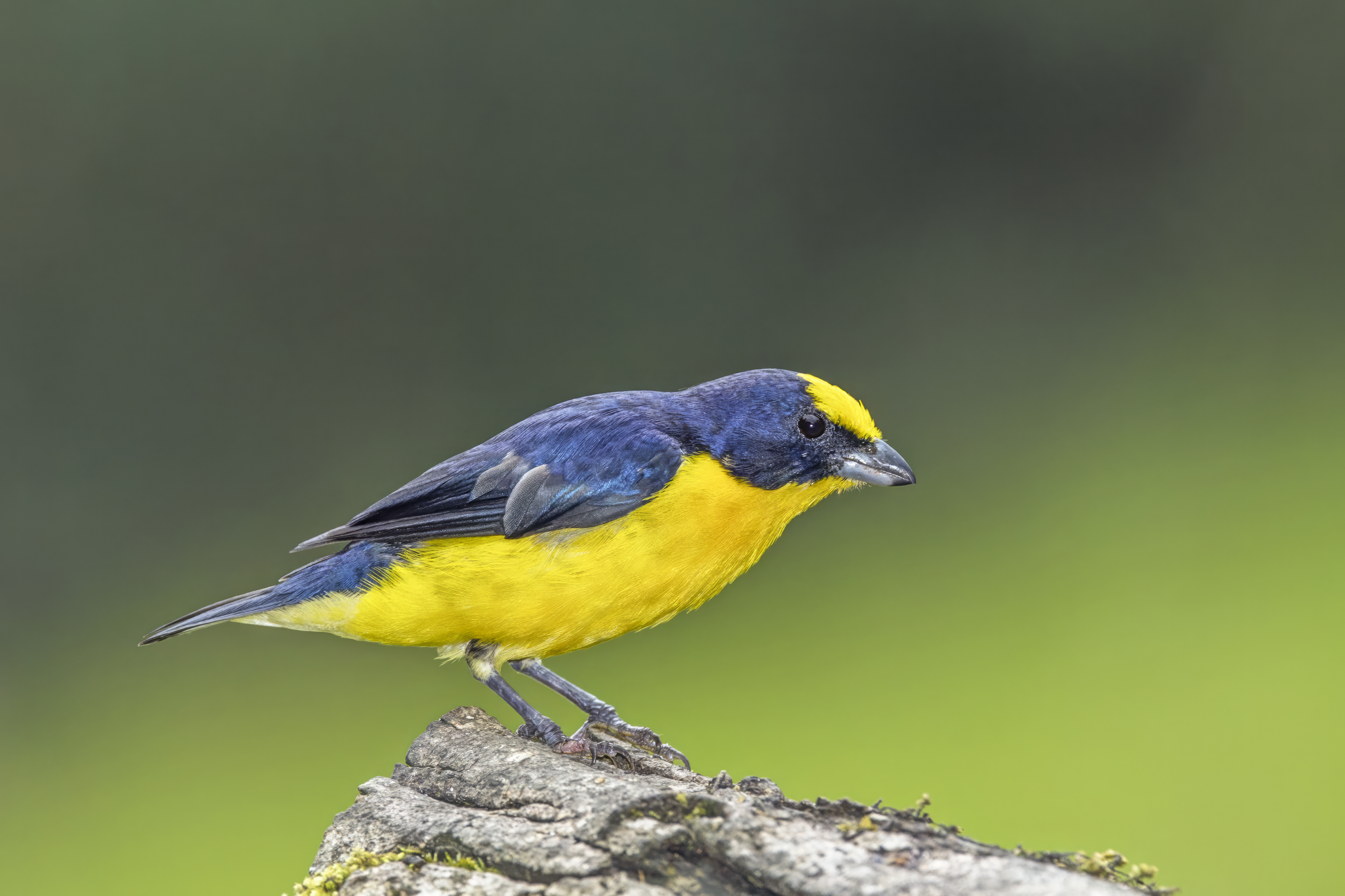
- Male
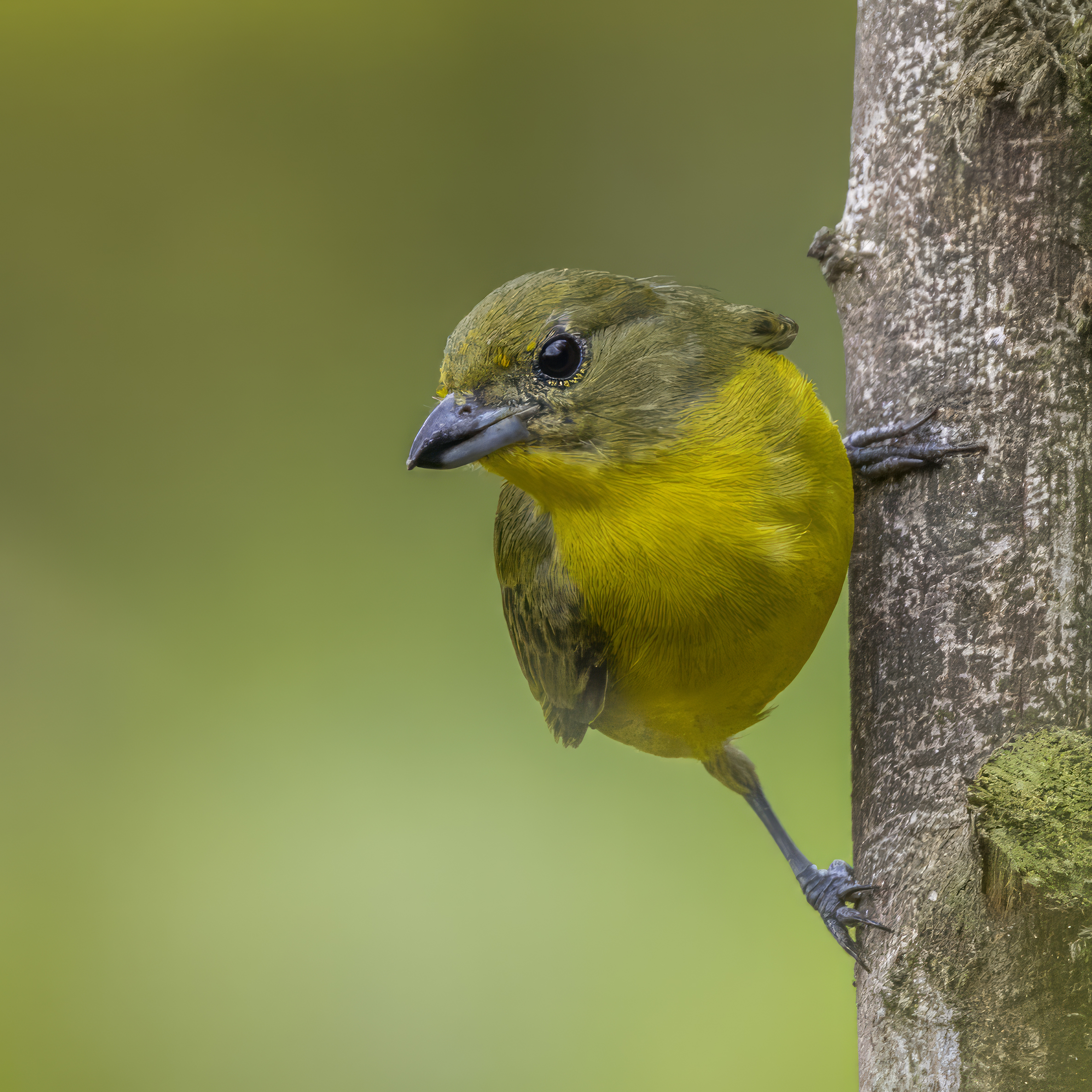
- Female both E. l. melanura, Colombia Euphonia laniirostris - Thick-billed Euphonia

Conservation status
- Least Concern (IUCN 3.1)

Scientific classification
- Kingdom: Animalia
- Phylum: Chordata
- Class: Aves
- Order: Passeriformes
- Family: Fringillidae
- Subfamily: Euphoniinae
- Genus: Euphonia
- Species: E. laniirostris

Binomial name
- Euphonia laniirostris D'Orbigny & Lafresnaye, 1837

= Thick-billed euphonia =

Species of bird

The thick-billed euphonia (Euphonia laniirostris) is a species of bird in the family Fringillidae, the finches and euphonias. It is found in Bolivia, Brazil, Colombia, Costa Rica, Ecuador, Panama, Peru, and Venezuela.

== Taxonomy and systematics ==
The thick-billed euphonia was originally described in 1837 with its current binomial Euphonia laniirostris (though spelled as "E. lanii rostris"). The genus Euphonia had long been placed in the family Thraupidae, the "true" tanagers. Multiple studies in the late twentieth and early twenty-first centuries resulted in its being reassigned to its present place in the family Fringillidae.

The thick-billed euphonia has these five subspecies:

- E. l. crassirostris Sclater, PL, 1857
- E. l. melanura Sclater, PL, 1851
- E. l. hypoxantha Berlepsch & Taczanowski, 1884
- E. l. zopholega (Oberholser, 1918)
- E. l. laniirostris D'Orbigny & Lafresnaye, 1837

Subspecies E. l. melanura was originally described as a full species. Within Euphonia laniirostris the Clements taxonomy and the American Ornithological Society treat E. l. melanura and E. l. crassirostris as the "thick-billed euphonia (black-tailed)" and the other three subspecies as the "thick-billed euphonia (thick-billed).

== Description ==
The thick-billed euphonia is about 10 cm (3.9 in) long and weighs 13 to 16.5 g (0.46 to 0.58 oz). It is a small euphonia with one of the thicker bills of all euphonias, though it is not dramatically larger than the others'. The species is sexually dimorphic. Adult males of the nominate subspecies E. l. laniirostris have a bright yellow forehead; the patch extends slightly past the eye. The rest of their crown and their face, nape, and upperparts are glossy blue-black. Their upperwing coverts and flight feathers are dusky with a dark blue tinge. Their tail's upper surface is dark blue and its underside dark gray with white inner webs on the underside of the outer three pairs of feathers. Their throat and underparts are bright yellow. Adult females have a yellowish olive-green head, upperparts, wings, and tail. Their underparts are greenish yellow that is lightest on the undertail coverts.

The other subspecies of the thick-billed euphonia differ from the nominate and each other thus:

- E. l. crassirostris: male like nominate but with yellow extending further back on the crown
- E. l. melanura: male has darker orange-yellow underparts than nominate with no white on the undertail; female has darker underparts than nominate
- E. l. hypoxantha: male has entirely lemon-yellow crown and lighter, brighter yellow, underparts
- E. l. zopholega: male like nominate but with smaller white patches on the undertail

Both sexes of all subspecies have a dark brown iris, a blackish bill with a blue-gray base to the mandible, and dark gray legs and feet.

== Distribution and habitat ==
The thick-billed euphonia has a disjunct distribution. The subspecies are found thus:

- E. l. crassirostris: Pacific slope from central Puntarenas and San José provinces in Costa Rica south to Panama's Veraguas Province; on both slopes of Panama from there and south on Colombia's Pacific slope to central Chocó Department; across northern Colombia and south in the valleys of the Cauca and Magdalena rivers, and continuing east across northeastern Venezuela to western Sucre (state)
- E. l. melanura: from much of southeastern Colombia south through eastern Ecuador and eastern Peru to Pasco Department; from there east across Amazonian Brazil south of the Amazon River to western Pará
- E. l. hypoxantha: Pacific slope of Ecuador from about the Colombian border south into Peru to southern Cajamarca Department
- E. l. zopholega: Junín and Cuzco departments in east-central Peru
- E. l. laniirostris: southeastern Peru and northern and central Bolivia and east into southern Amazonian Brazil to Mato Grosso and southwestern Goiás

The thick-billed euphonia inhabits a wide variety of somewhat open landscapes in the tropical and subtropical zones. In Central America, northern Colombia, and Venezuela it is found in dry to humid areas on the edges and in clearings of forest, gallery forest, woodlots, cultivated areas, and gardens and trees around human habitations. In western Ecuador it occurs in semi-open forest that in the north is humid and in the south dry; the dry landscapes are also in northwestern Peru. In the Amazon Basin it occurs along rivers in várzea and terra firme forest, on river islands, and in clearings and secondary forest. In elevation it reaches 1,100 m (3,600 ft) in Costa Rica, 2,400 m (7,900 ft) in Colombia, 1,500 m (4,900 ft) in Ecuador, 1,200 m (3,900 ft) in Peru, 1,900 m (6,200 ft) in Venezuela, and 1,200 m (3,900 ft) and occasionally higher in Brazil.

== Behavior ==
=== Movement ===
The thick-billed euphonia is a year-round resident.

=== Feeding ===
The thick-billed euphonia feeds primarily on the fruits of mistletoe (Loranthaceae) and other small fruits, and also includes small numbers of insects in its diet. It mostly forages in pairs and in small groups and often associates with mixed-species feeding flocks. In the forest it forages primarily in the canopy and occasionally lower at the forest edge.

=== Breeding ===
The thick-billed euphonia breeds between March and September in Panama and probably in that window in Costa Rica. Its season appears to span April to July in Colombia and includes March in Ecuador. Both sexes build the nest, a globe with a side entrance made from twigs, leaves, and plant fibers lined with dry grass. It typically is placed within about 3 m (10 ft) of the ground and sometimes on the ground, but nests have been found as high as 15 m (50 ft) up. Nests are usually well hidden and have been found in a tree trunk's cavity, among epiphytes and vines on tree limbs, and in branch forks. The clutch is two to five eggs that are white or pinkish white with brown speckles. The incubation period is 14 to 16 days and fledging occurs 18 to 21 days after hatch. Both parents provision nestlings.

=== Vocalization ===
The thick-billed euphonia is rather vocal and a good mimic of other birds' vocalizations. Its song is "highly variable, a choppy series of call notes mixed with whistles, warbles, and piercing notes". Another description is "a long rambling series of original notes and mimicked notes of other birds". Its calls include "[a] loud, sharp, whistled preet!, harsh, buzzy rattles, tz’i’i’i’i’t, and many semi-musical notes and phrases".

== Status ==
The IUCN has assessed the thick-billed euphonia as being of Least Concern. It has an extremely large range and its estimated population of at least five million mature individuals is believed to be stable. No immediate threats have been identified. It is considered uncommon in Costa Rica, common in Colombia, "widespread" in Ecuador, fairly common in Peru and Venezuela, and "common to frequent" in Brazil. It occurs in many protected areas, and though the "vast majority of habitat where it occurs is unprotected, this species appears to be at little risk in the near term".

== Gallery ==
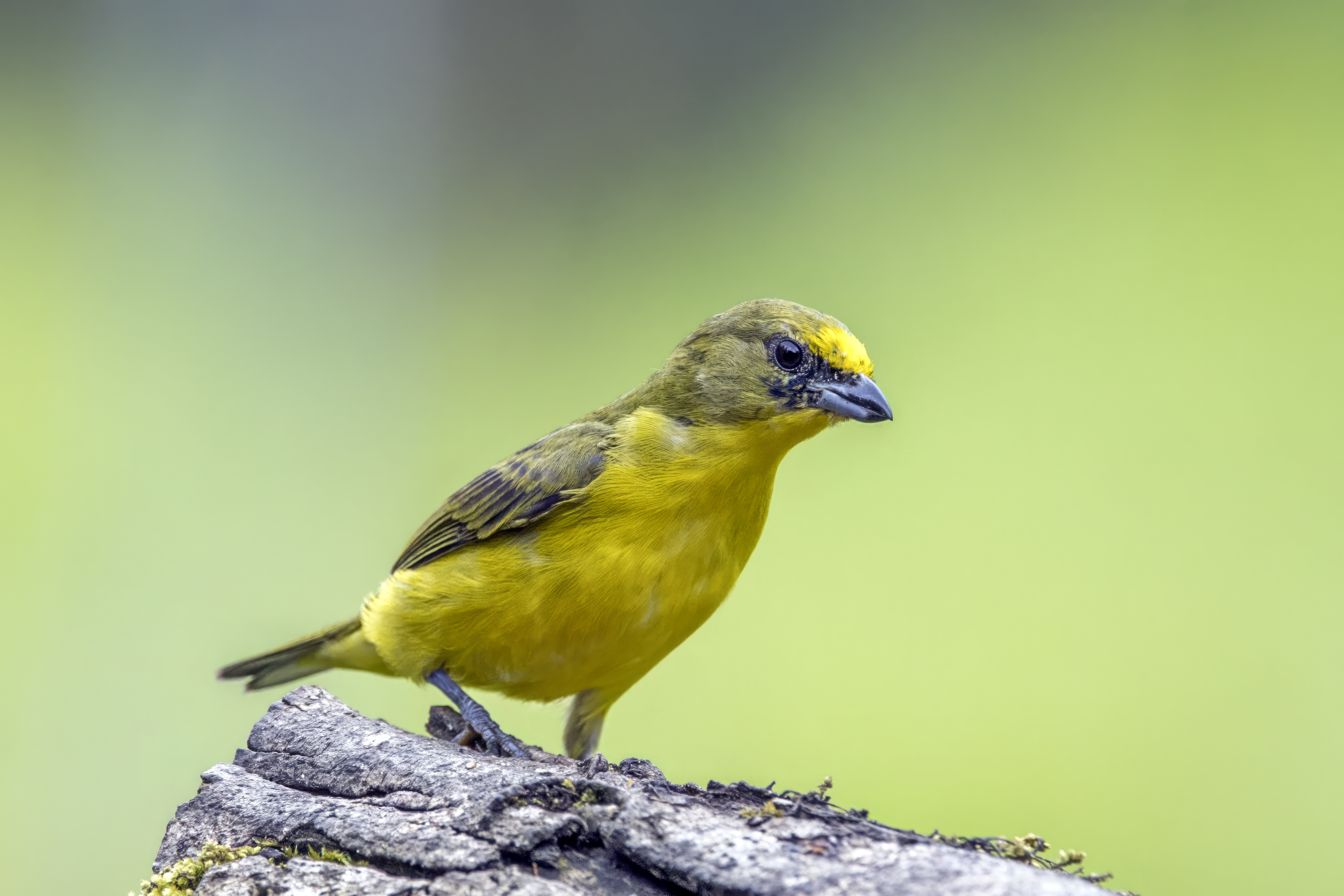
Juvenile male E. l. melanura
Colombia

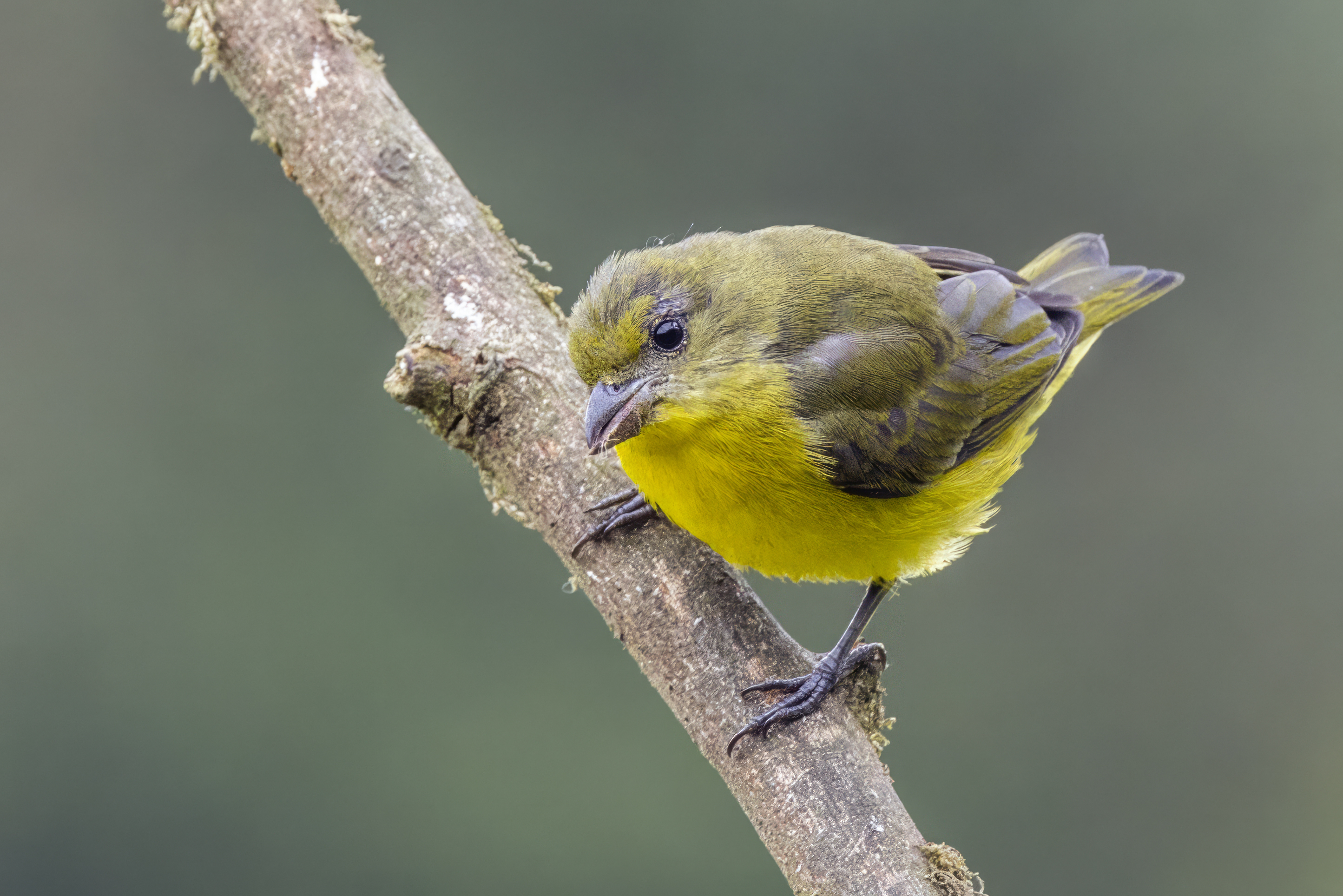
Female E. l. melanura
Colombia

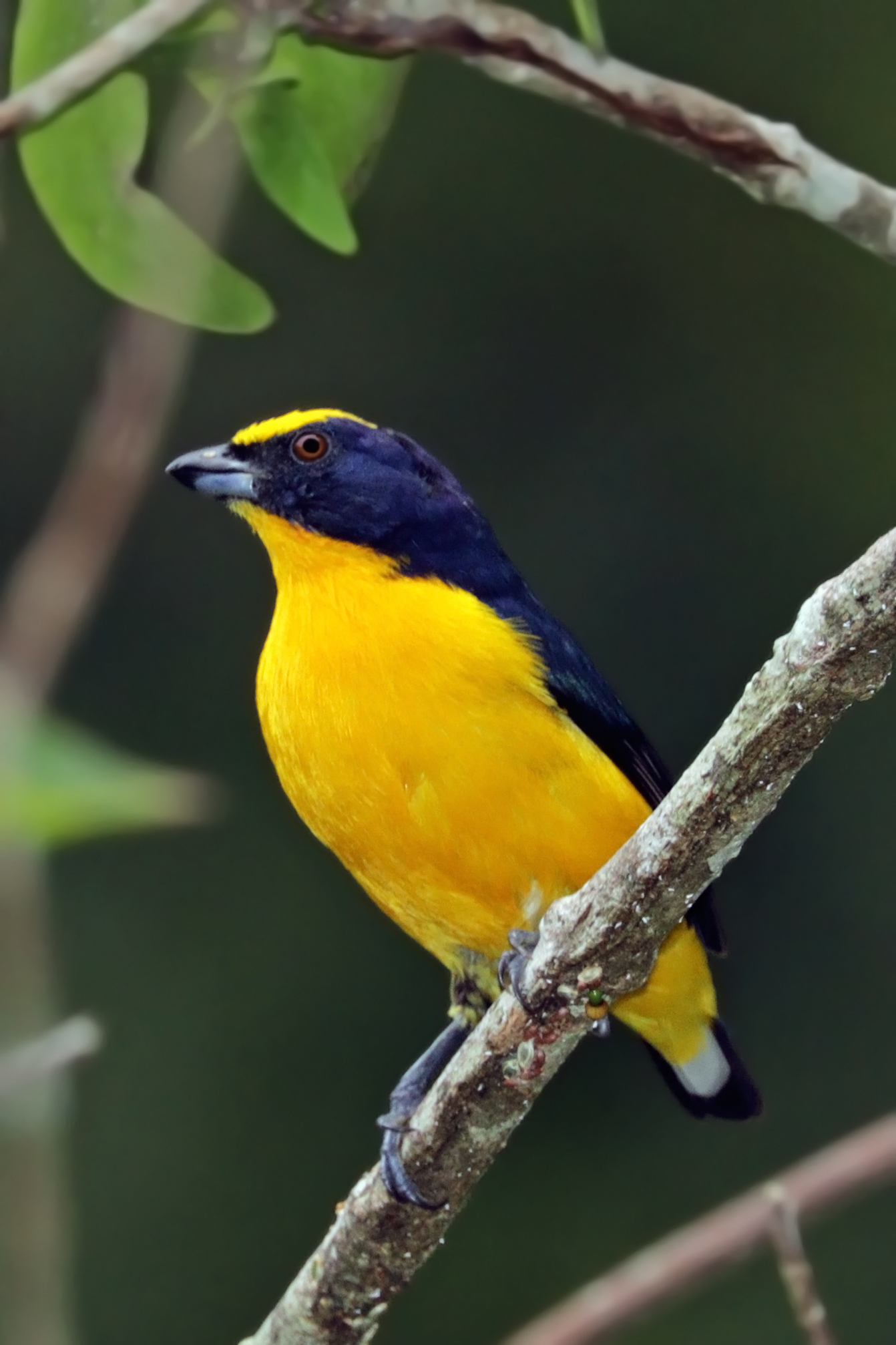
Male E. l. crassirostris
Panama
