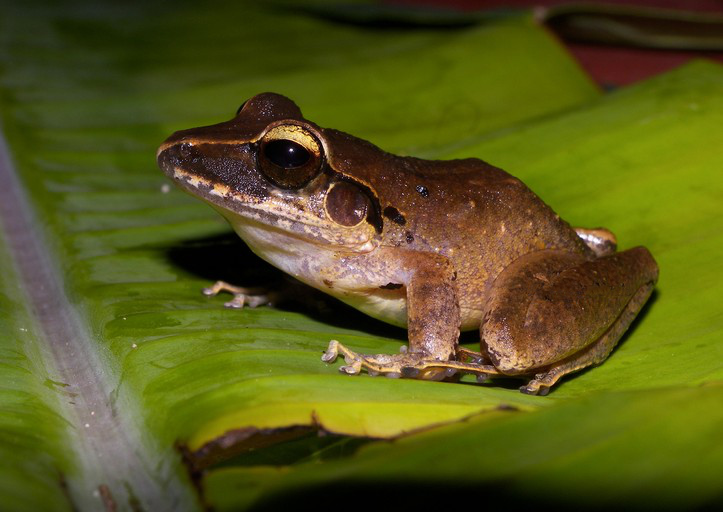

Conservation status
- Least Concern (IUCN 3.1)

Scientific classification
- Kingdom: Animalia
- Phylum: Chordata
- Class: Amphibia
- Order: Anura
- Family: Craugastoridae
- Genus: Craugastor
- Species: C. raniformis

Binomial name
- Craugastor raniformis (Boulenger, 1896)

Synonyms
- Hylodes raniformis Boulenger, 1896; Eleutherodactylus raniformis (Boulenger, 1896)

= Craugastor raniformis =

Species of amphibian

Craugastor raniformis (common name: robber frog) is a species of frog in the family Craugastoridae. It is found in Colombia and Panama. It is a reasonably common species found in humid lowland and montane forests up to 1,500 m (4,900 ft) asl. It is also common in wet pastureland. Furthermore, it is one of the dominant frogs in abandoned mixed farming areas in the coastal Pacific rainforests in Colombia. This adaptable species is not considered threatened.

== Description ==
Craugastor raniformis is a relatively large frog with a rather pointed snout. Adult females are much larger (snout–vent length 52–74 mm (2.0–2.9 in)) than males (27–43 mm (1.1–1.7 in)).

== Habitat ==
This frog has been observed between 0 and 1500 meters above sea level in montane and lowland forests with high humidity. People have also seen it in pastureland. However, people do not often see it in primary forest.

The frog's range includes at least one protected park, including the Ranita Dorada Amphibian Reserve, Parque Nacional Darién, and Area de Manejo Especial Nusagandi.

== Diet ==
The robber frog's diet consists primarily of crickets, millipedes, spiders and ants.

== Behaviour and reproduction ==
During the day individuals are found on the forest floor concealed in leaf litter. At night they may climb to vegetation to heights of 2.5 m above ground or more. Males and juveniles climb more than the larger females. The call of males has been described as a "ha ha ha ha".

Female C. raniformis have been observed to guard their eggs. Along with other species in the genus Craugastor, C. raniformis lays terrestrial eggs that hatch directly into small froglets. Guarding probably protects eggs against predators and fungi.
