= Lebrija, Santander =

Lebrija
- Municipality and town
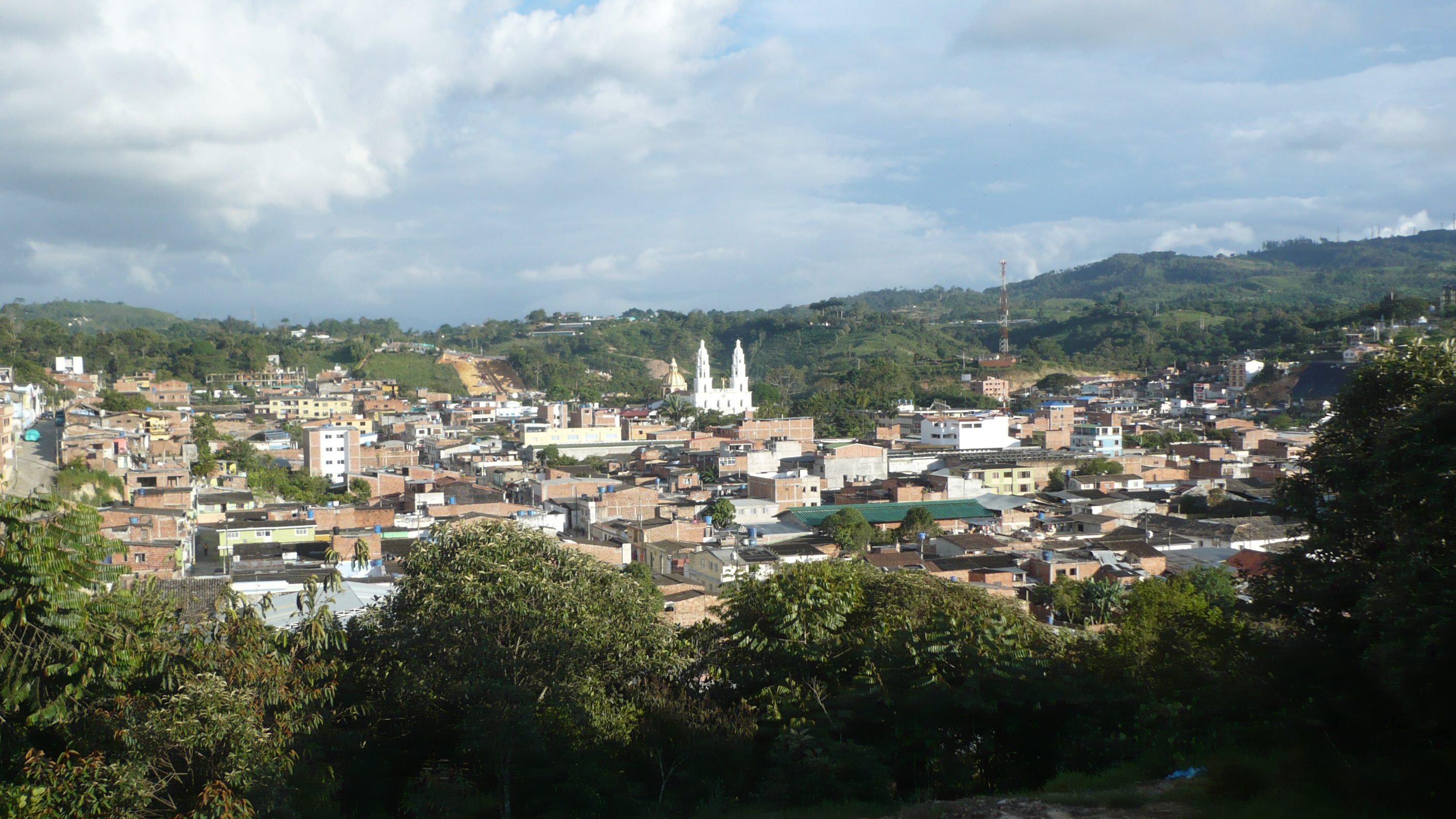
- Panorama of the city

- Flag

- Location of the municipality and town of Lebrija in the Santander Department of Colombia
- Coordinates: 7°25′N 73°25′W
- Country: Colombia
- Department: Santander

Area
  - Municipality and town: 550.4 km^{2} (212.5 sq mi)
  - Urban: 2.91 km^{2} (1.12 sq mi)
- Elevation: 1,055 m (3,461 ft)

Population (2020 est.)
  - Municipality and town: 44,169
  - Density: 80.25/km^{2} (207.8/sq mi)
  - Urban: 24,701
  - Urban density: 8,490/km^{2} (22,000/sq mi)
- Time zone: UTC-5 (Colombia Standard Time)

Lebrija is a town and municipality in the Santander Department in northeastern Colombia.

== Climate ==
Climate data for Lebrija (Palonegro International Airport), elevation 1,189 m (3,901 ft), (1981–2010)
Month	Jan	Feb	Mar	Apr	May	Jun	Jul	Aug	Sep	Oct	Nov	Dec	Year
Record high °C (°F)	30.1 (86.2)	32.2 (90.0)	29.6 (85.3)	29.2 (84.6)	29.8 (85.6)	29.4 (84.9)	29.2 (84.6)	30.3 (86.5)	30.6 (87.1)	29.8 (85.6)	29.0 (84.2)	29.2 (84.6)	32.2 (90.0)
Mean daily maximum °C (°F)	25.3 (77.5)	25.5 (77.9)	25.4 (77.7)	25.3 (77.5)	25.6 (78.1)	25.6 (78.1)	25.8 (78.4)	26.0 (78.8)	26.0 (78.8)	25.4 (77.7)	24.9 (76.8)	25.0 (77.0)	25.5 (77.9)
Daily mean °C (°F)	21.3 (70.3)	21.7 (71.1)	21.7 (71.1)	21.6 (70.9)	21.6 (70.9)	21.5 (70.7)	21.5 (70.7)	21.6 (70.9)	21.4 (70.5)	21.0 (69.8)	20.9 (69.6)	21.0 (69.8)	21.4 (70.5)
Mean daily minimum °C (°F)	18.5 (65.3)	18.8 (65.8)	19.0 (66.2)	19.0 (66.2)	18.9 (66.0)	18.8 (65.8)	18.5 (65.3)	18.5 (65.3)	18.3 (64.9)	18.3 (64.9)	18.4 (65.1)	18.4 (65.1)	18.6 (65.5)
Record low °C (°F)	15.0 (59.0)	15.4 (59.7)	15.6 (60.1)	13.8 (56.8)	16.0 (60.8)	15.6 (60.1)	14.2 (57.6)	12.4 (54.3)	15.5 (59.9)	13.0 (55.4)	15.8 (60.4)	15.6 (60.1)	12.4 (54.3)
Average precipitation mm (inches)	59.8 (2.35)	89.1 (3.51)	121.9 (4.80)	125.0 (4.92)	121.4 (4.78)	75.7 (2.98)	84.5 (3.33)	79.2 (3.12)	100.8 (3.97)	149.0 (5.87)	122.9 (4.84)	60.1 (2.37)	1,189.4 (46.83)
Average precipitation days	8	9	14	17	19	17	18	19	19	18	15	9	179
Average relative humidity (%)	83	82	83	86	87	86	84	84	85	87	89	87	85
Mean monthly sunshine hours	210.8	166.7	145.7	138.0	148.8	144.0	164.3	164.3	150.0	151.9	147.0	179.8	1,911.3
Mean daily sunshine hours	6.8	5.9	4.7	4.6	4.8	4.8	5.3	5.3	5.0	4.9	4.9	5.8	5.2
Source: Instituto de Hidrologia Meteorologia y Estudios Ambientales

== See also ==
- Lebrija River
