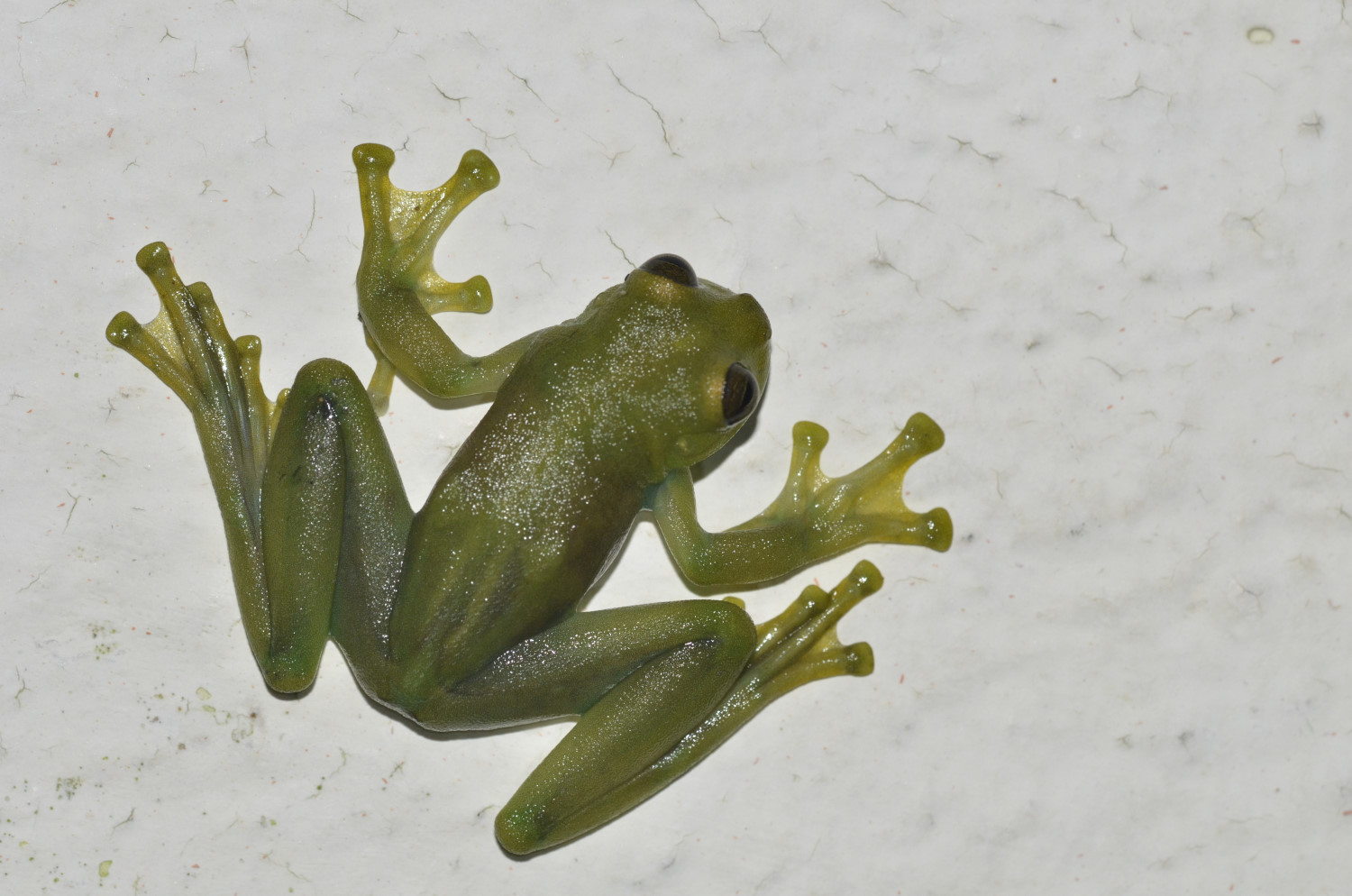

Conservation status
- Least Concern (IUCN 3.1)

Scientific classification
- Kingdom: Animalia
- Phylum: Chordata
- Class: Amphibia
- Order: Anura
- Family: Centrolenidae
- Genus: Sachatamia
- Species: S. orejuela

Binomial name
- Sachatamia orejuela (Duellman and Burrowes, 1989)

Synonyms
- Centrolenella orejuela Duellman and Burrowes, 1989; Cochranella orejuela (Duellman and Burrowes, 1989); Rulyrana orejuela (Duellman and Burrowes, 1989); Teratohyla sornozai Cisneros-Heredia, Yánez-Muñoz, and Ortega-Andrade, 2009

= Sachatamia orejuela =

Species of frog

Sachatamia orejuela is a species of frog in the family Centrolenidae. It is found on the Pacific versant of the Cordillera Occidental in southern Colombia (Valle del Cauca, Cauca, and Nariño Departments) and on the Pacific Andean slopes of northwestern Ecuador (Esmeraldas, Imbabura, Pichincha, and Santo Domingo de los Tsáchilas Provinces). Common name El Tambo Cochran frog has been coined for it.

== Etymology ==
The specific name orejuela honors the Orejuela family who administered the Reserva La Planada, Colombia, where some specimens in the type series were collected.

== Description ==
Adult males measure 27–28 mm (1.1–1.1 in) and females 30–34 mm (1.2–1.3 in) in snout–vent length. The snout is truncate. The head is slightly wider than it is long. The tympanum is small but visible. Both fingers and toes are webbed. The dorsum is uniformly dark green. The venter is translucent with greenish tint. The iris is dark gray, with yellow ring around pupil. Dorsal skin is smooth.

== Habitat and conservation ==
Its natural habitats are rainforests and lower humid montane forests at elevations of 500–1,250 m (1,640–4,100 ft) above sea level. They have been found at night on rocks along mountain streams or within the streams. They are adapted to live in the spray zone of cascades.

It is threatened by habitat loss. It occurs in the Munchique National Natural Park and La Planada Nature Reserve in Colombia. It occurs in several protected areas in Ecuador.
