= Interandean Valles =

Geographic region

The term Interandean valles (Spanish: valles interandinos) refers to those valleys located in the Andes mountains, typically large flat-bottomed valleys that allow for significant agriculture and settlement.

The interandean valles comprise most of the mid-elevation areas of the "sierra" of Peru, "los valles" of Bolivia and the "Cuyo region" of Argentina.

In Colombia the main interandean valleys are formed by Magdalena River and its affluent, the Cauca River.

== Geography ==
The rugged topography of the Central Andes creates the warm, dry valleys that typifies the valles. Generally lying between 1,200 and 3,500 meters above sea level (m.a.s.l.) or 4,000 - 13,000 feet above sea level. Much of the area features steep hillsides and deep canyons, including the world's deepest canyon, the Colca Canyon.

Most of the major cities and towns of the valles are found in broader, open valleys with expansive flat land created by ancient lakes or floodplains that is more amenable to agriculture than the highly erodible slopes.

To the south and west, are the harsh, frigid deserts, salt flats and alpine grasslands of the altiplano. To the north and east are the lush, wet, dense cloud forests or "yungas" of the front-range, downslope, and foothills of the Andes. Higher ridges, peaks, and plateaus, dominated by high-elevation alpine puna grasslands, Polylepis woodlands, or snow-capped peaks separate the valles from both of these ecoregions.

== Climate ==
The valles are marked by mild, wet summers, and cool dry winters. Timing of the seasons varies according to latitude. Generally, most rainfall occurs during summer ("el verano") from December through March. These rainy seasons can in fact be cool and damp for extended periods, though it can be quite warm during dry spells. Dry seasons are substantially colder; these dry winters ("el invierno") last from April through August. Any precipitation that does occur often falls as snow at higher elevations, though snow is extremely rare below 10,000 feet above sea level (3400m.a.s.l.). The warmest times of the year are the transitional months of Sep.-Nov.

== Ecoregions ==
The World Wildlife Fund identifies several distinct tropical dry forest ecoregions in the interandean valles:

- Bolivian montane dry forests (Bolivia)
- Cauca Valley dry forests (Colombia)
- Magdalena Valley dry forests (Colombia)
- Marañón dry forests (Peru)
- Patía Valley dry forests (Colombia)
- Sinú Valley dry forests (Colombia)

== Vegetation ==
Vegetation is often sparse or deciduous, resulting from the long dry season. Most of the native vegetation has been replaced by agriculture or invasive exotics that are still widely used, such as Eucalyptus spp., Phragmites spp., Pinus radiata Notable endemic plants include Schinus molle and various cactus species, though some of those may be non-native as well.

== Human settlement and influence ==
The majority of the human population of the central Andes, including most major cities, large towns, and agriculture, are found in these valleys.

=== Agriculture ===
Much of the land is devoted to agriculture, and the valles tend to be the breadbaskets of their departments or countries. A longer frost-free period, and a generally warmer climate makes the valles more amenable than the higher, colder altiplano for many crops. Further, many valles feature broad plains created by river floodplains or ancient lake beds, that serve better than the steeper more formidable terrain of the yungas. And the drier climate supports fewer parasites and diseases than the yungas or tropical regions.

Of particular importance are the production of potatoes and corn. At higher elevations, oca and other tubers as well as quinoa, wheat, barley and other grains. At lower elevations, peanuts, grapes and numerous other varieties of fruits and vegetables are also produced.

=== Cities and large towns in the interandean valles ===
Argentina:

- Salta
- Jujuy
- Catamarca
- La Rioja
- San Juan

Bolivia:

- La Paz
- Cochabamba
- Sucre
- Tarija (Central Valley of Tarija)
- Villazón
- Tupiza

Colombia

- Medellín (Aburra Valley)
- Cali (Cauca Valley)
- Ibagué (Magdalena River Valley)
- Pasto (Atriz Valley)
- Neiva (Magdalena River Valley)
- Tuluá (Cauca Valley)
- Popayán (Pubenza Valley)

Peru:

- Cajamarca
- Huánuco
- Huancayo
- Ayacucho
- Abancay
- Andahuaylas
- Arequipa
- Cusco
