= Ecuadorian dry forests =

Ecoregion near the Pacific coast of Ecuador

Ecuadorian dry forests (NT0214)
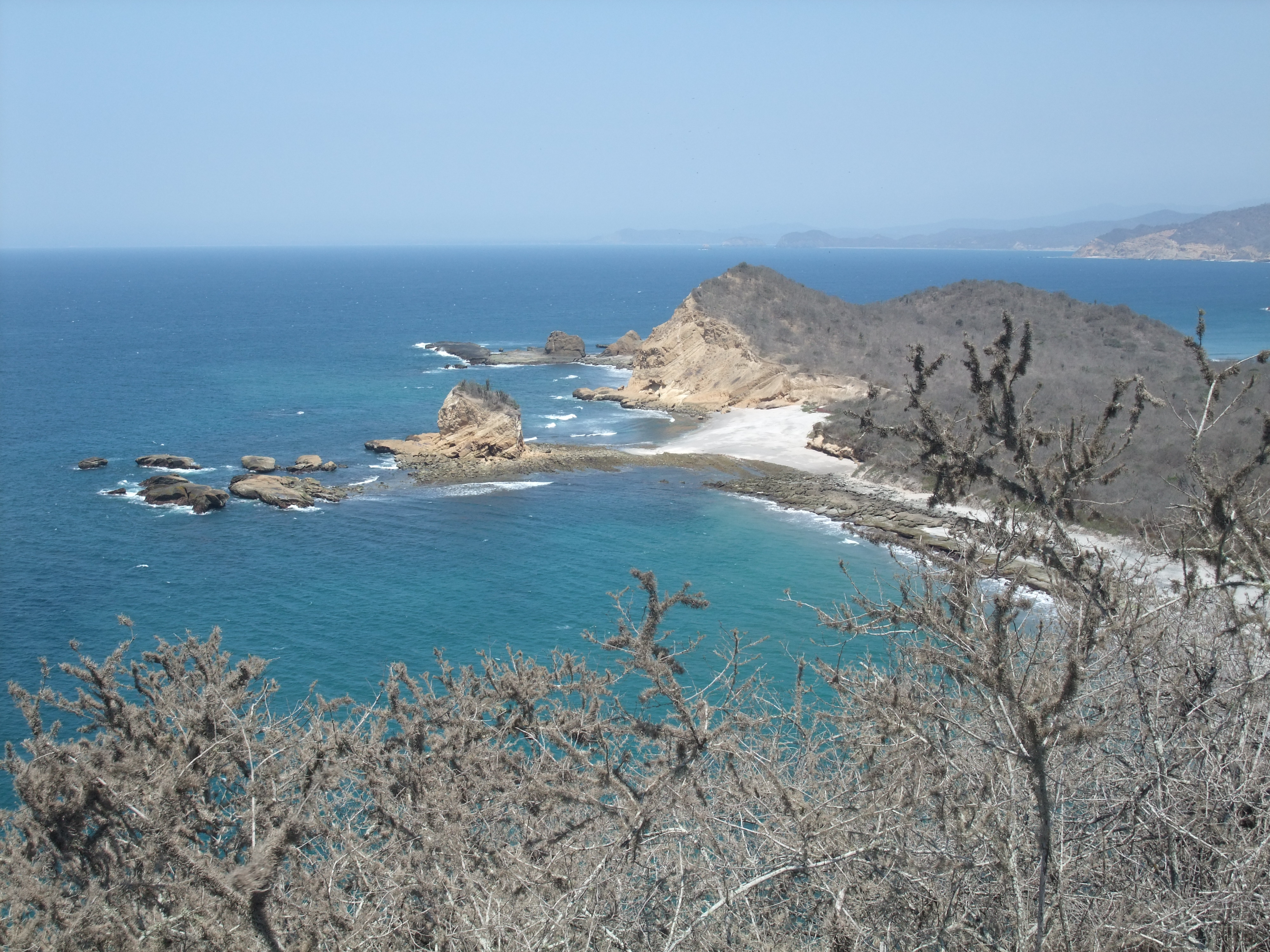
- Coast of Machalilla National Park

- Location in northwest South America

Ecology
- Realm: Neotropical
- Biome: Tropical and subtropical dry broadleaf forests

Geography
- Area: 21,238 km^{2} (8,200 sq mi)
- Countries: Ecuador
- Coordinates: 1.349°S 80.333°W
- Climate type: Aw: equatorial, dry winter

Conservation
- Global 200: Tumbesian-Andean Valleys Dry Forests

The Ecuadorian dry forests (NT0214) is an ecoregion near the Pacific coast of the Ecuador. The habitat has been occupied by people for centuries and has been severely damaged by deforestation, overgrazing and hillside erosion due to unsustainable agriculture. Only 1% of the original forest remains. The patches of forest, mostly secondary growth, are fragmented. They are home to many endemic species at risk of extinction.

== Location ==
The Ecuadorian dry forests have an area of 2,123,790 hectares (5,248,000 acres). The ecoregion is mainly along the Pacific coast of central Ecuador to the north and west of Guayaquil, with a section to the east of Guayaquil. The western area is in the Cordillera de la Costa (Coastal Range) mountains. The western portion is bounded to the east by Western Ecuador moist forests. It adjoins South American Pacific mangroves along sections of the coast. The eastern portion is also bounded to the east by Western Ecuador moist forests, but to the west is bounded by Guayaquil flooded grasslands. Further south the similar Tumbes–Piura dry forests extend across the border with Peru.

== Physical ==
The ecoregion covers land that slopes down from the western foothills of the Andes to the Pacific Ocean. The higher land receives more rain. The Köppen climate classification is "Aw": equatorial, dry winter. At a sample location at coordinates 1.25°S 80.25°W average monthly temperatures ranged from 24.9 °C (76.8 °F) in June to 26.1 °C (79.0 °F) in February. Mean annual temperature was about 25.5 °C (77.9 °F).

== Ecology ==
The Ecuadorian dry forests are in the neotropical realm, in the tropical and subtropical dry broadleaf forests biome. The ecoregion is part of the Tumbes–Chocó–Magdalena biodiversity hotspot, one of 25 biogeographic regions globally that have with a significant reservoir of biodiversity under threat from humans. The ecoregion is part of the 103,000 square kilometres (40,000 sq mi) Tumbesian-Andean Valleys Dry Forests global ecoregion, which holds six terrestrial ecoregions: Tumbes–Piura dry forests, Ecuadorian dry forests, Patía Valley dry forests, Magdalena Valley dry forests, Cauca Valley dry forests and Marañón dry forests. The fauna and flora of the global ecoregion have high levels of endemism.

=== Flora ===
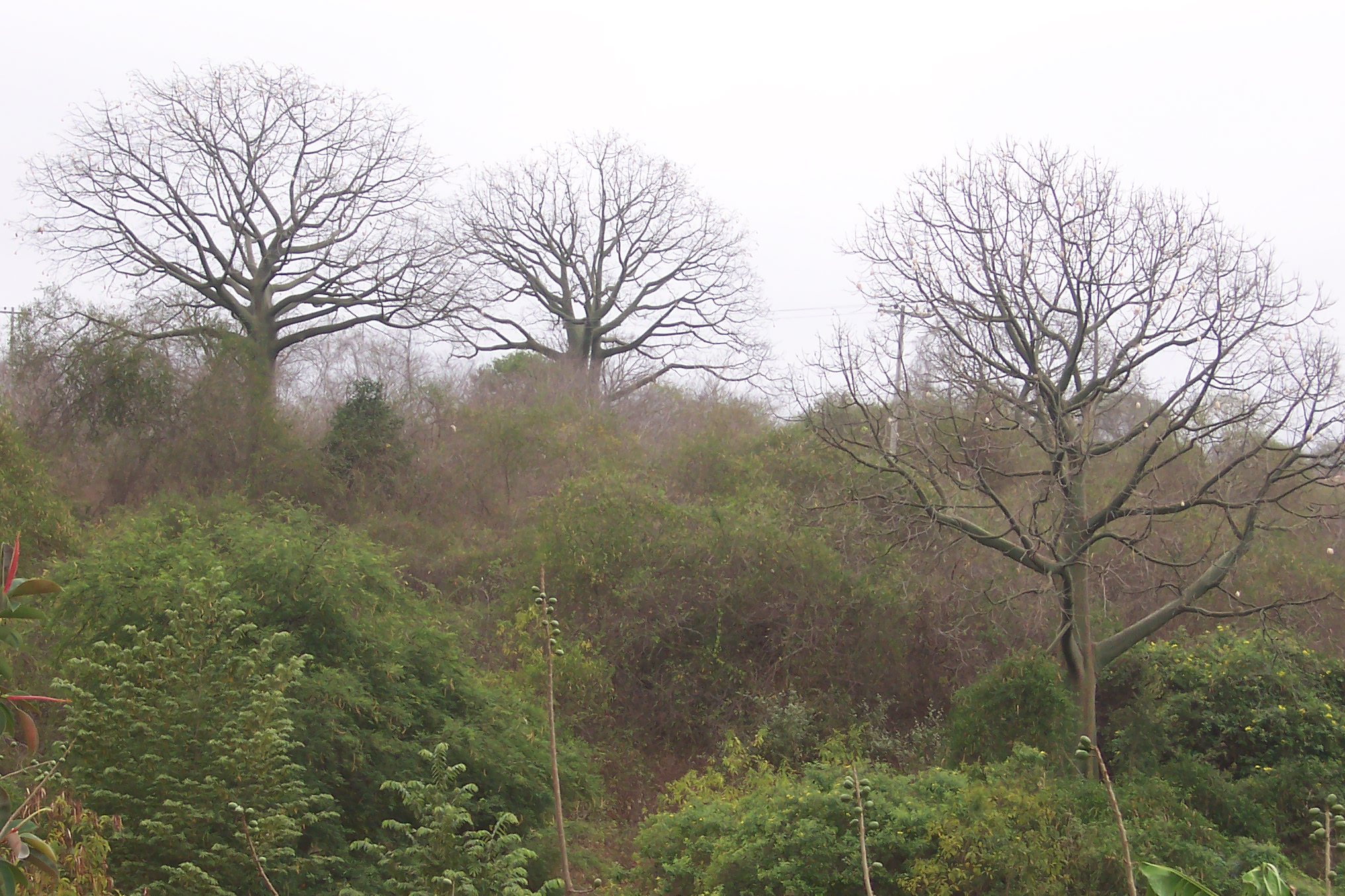
Semi-arid forest in the Santa Elena peninsula

Floristic structure of tropical dry forests range from scrub, thorn, deciduous, to semi-evergreen. There are areas along the coast of cactus forest and arid scrub, unusual for the Pacific coast of the Americas. The duration of dry periods as well as mean annual precipitation have a significant impact on habitat suitability for specific taxa, resulting in various habitat types present. Both on the coast and inland there are trees adapted to the dry conditions that last for most of the year, such as acacia, jacaranda, mesquite, fig and cacti. 20% of the plant species are endemic.

Most plants shed their leaves during the dry season to reduce water loss, and stop photosynthesis. The Ceiba trichastandra has a green bark that lets it continue photosynthesis without leaves. This tree, which emerges from the canopy, has wood that rots easily and therefore has often been spared by loggers. Several species of kapok trees (Ceiba genus) grow thorns on their trunks when young for protection against animals seeking water, but discard the thorns as they mature. Other adaptations include a waxy layer on leaves to reduce evaporation, closing leaves at night to reduce the exposed area and storing water in thick roots or stems.

=== Fauna ===
Most of the large mammals of the ecoregion still survive, despite the human pressure, although some are reduced to small populations. Surviving mammals probably include mantled howler (Alouatta palliata), white-fronted capuchin (Cebus albifrons), jaguar (Panthera onca), ocelot (Leopardus pardalis), margay (Leopardus wiedii), white-lipped peccary (Tayassu pecari), white-tailed deer (Odocoileus virginianus), red brocket (Mazama americana), lowland paca (Cuniculus paca) and Central American agouti (Dasyprocta punctata). Endangered reptiles include green sea turtle (Chelonia mydas) and hawksbill sea turtle (Eretmochelys imbricata).

The dry forests are used by bird species adapted to dry conditions, as resting places for migrant birds, and as seasonal sources of fruit for birds from the adjoining montane forests. About 30% of the bird species in the Tumbes Region of coastal Ecuador and Peru, or 77 species, are endemic. Most of these mainly inhabit Ecuador. 22 species are thought to be globally at risk of extinction. Species found in the transitional forest on the Pacific slope of the Andes include grey-backed hawk (Pseudastur occidentalis), El Oro parakeet (Pyrrhura orcesi), crowned woodnymph (Thalurania colombica), El Oro tapaculo (Scytalopus robbinsi), buffy tuftedcheek (Pseudocolaptes lawrencii) and ochraceous attila (Attila torridus).

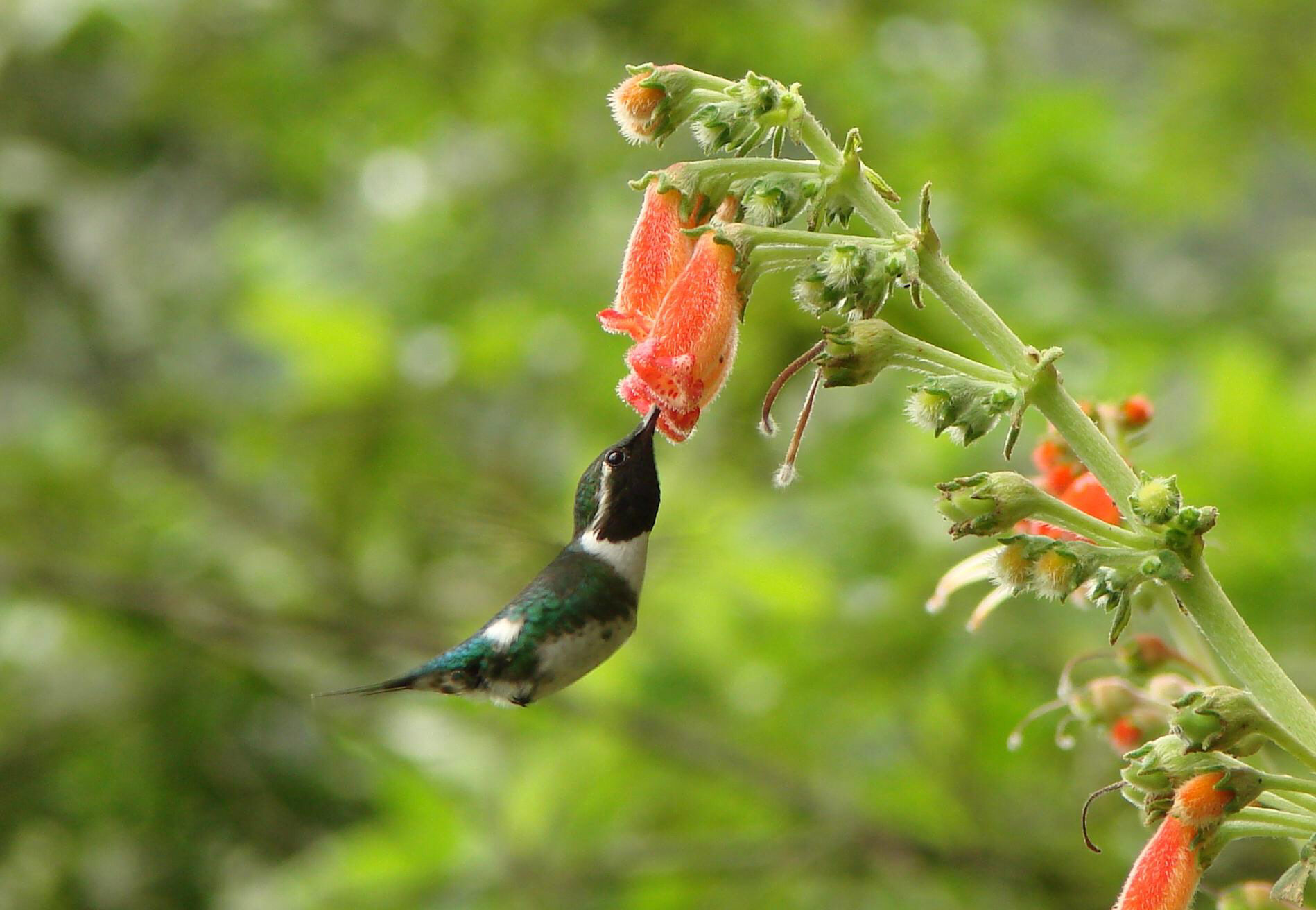
Esmeraldas woodstar (Chaetocercus berlepschi) at Ayampe, Manabí Province

Species that frequent the coastal mountains or southern part of the ecoregion include pale-browed tinamou (Crypturellus transfasciatus), rufous-headed chachalaca (Ortalis erythroptera), ochre-bellied dove (Leptotila ochraceiventris), great green macaw (Ara ambiguus), red-masked parakeet (Psittacara erythrogenys), grey-cheeked parakeet (Brotogeris pyrrhoptera), Esmeraldas woodstar (Chaetocercus berlepschi), little woodstar (Chaetocercus bombus), Watkins's antpitta (Grallaria watkinsi), blackish-headed spinetail (Synallaxis tithys), henna-hooded foliage-gleaner (Clibanornis erythrocephalus), Pacific royal flycatcher (Onychorhynchus coronatus occidentalis), grey-breasted flycatcher (Lathrotriccus griseipectus), slaty becard (Pachyramphus spodiurus) and saffron siskin (Spinus siemiradzkii). Species found elsewhere include pale-headed brush finch (Atlapetes pallidiceps), rufous-necked foliage-gleaner (Syndactyla ruficollis), black-eared hemispingus (Hemispingus melanotis), grey-headed antbird (Ampelornis griseiceps), black-cowled saltator (Saltator nigriceps) and bay-crowned brush finch (Atlapetes seebohmi).

Endangered birds include great green macaw (Ara ambiguus), grey-cheeked parakeet (Brotogeris pyrrhoptera), Esmeraldas woodstar (Chaetocercus berlepschi), gray-backed hawk (Pseudastur occidentalis), slaty becard (Pachyramphus spodiurus), waved albatross (Phoebastria irrorata), yellow-bellied seedeater (Sporophila nigricollis), Peruvian tern (Sternula lorata) and blackish-headed spinetail (Synallaxis tithys). Critically endangered species of the bamboo thickets in the southwest include pale-headed brush finch (Atlapetes pallidiceps), black-eared hemispingus (Hemispingus melanotis) and gray-headed antbird (Ampelornis griseiceps).

== Status ==
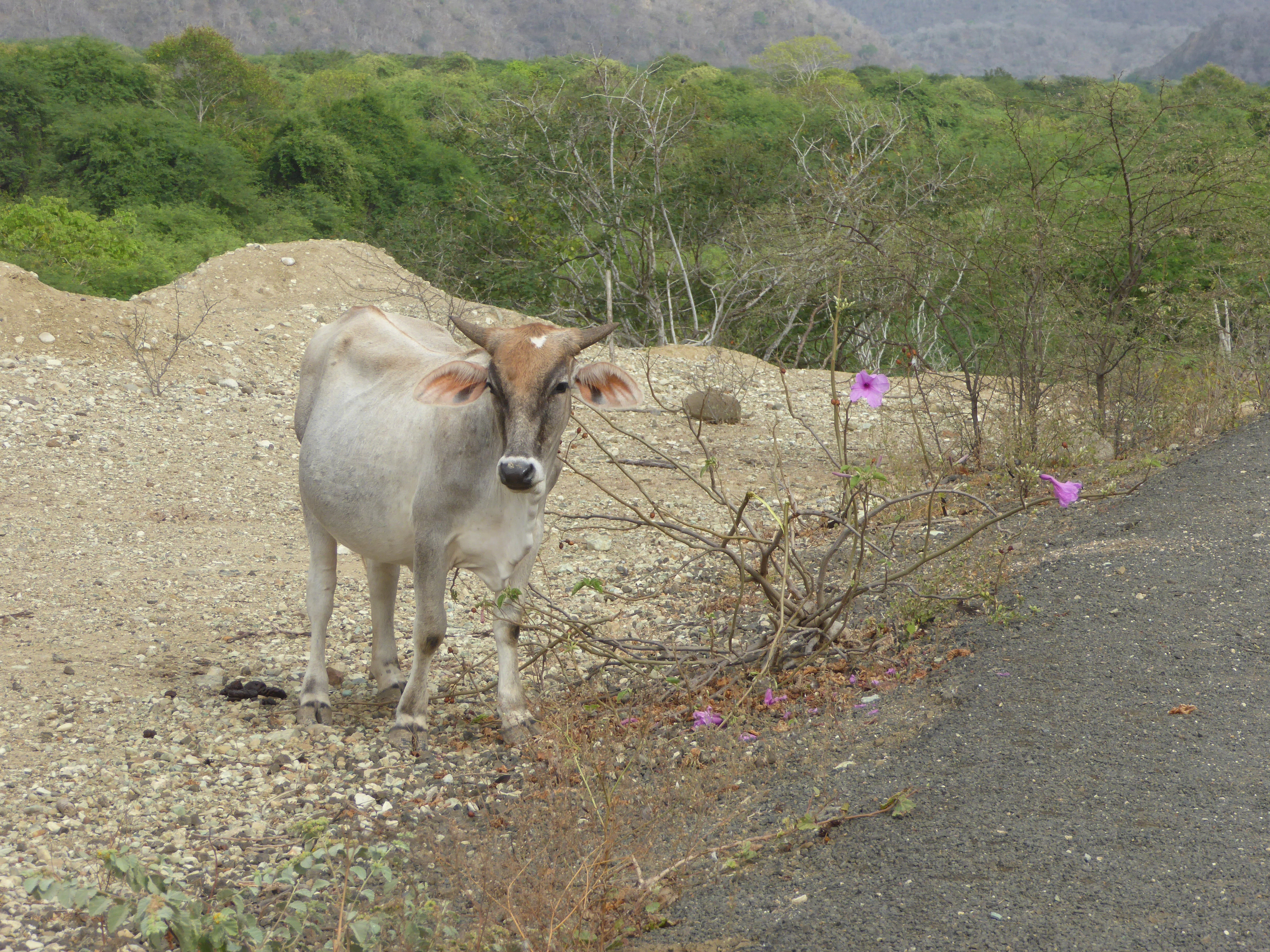
Cow in Agua Blanca, a protected area

The World Wildlife Fund gives the ecoregion the status of "Critical/Endangered". The ecoregion shows the impact of human occupation over several centuries, mostly in the transition zone and along watercourses. The growth of farming in western Ecuador has destroyed 99% of the original dry forest. The present forest consists mostly of secondary growth remnants scattered across the region. Under 25% of the original area is still covered by dry forest. The western Ecuadorian forests, including the Ecuadorian dry forests, has one of greatest risks in the world of biological extinction due to human activities such as deforestation. The main threats come from deforestation, including selective removal of valuable tree species, slashing and burning to clear and for agriculture, planting crops on unstable hillsides and overgrazing. Most vertebrates in the ecoregion, many of which are endemic, face great risks of extinction.

== Conservation ==
Conservation units protecting parts of the forest include the Machalilla National Park, Cerro Blanco Protective Forest, Molleturo Protective Forest and Arenillas Military Reserve. The privately owned 200 hectares (490 acres) Lalo Loor Dry Forest Reserve in Manabí Province lies in the transition from the very wet northern forests and the very dry southern forests, and has very diverse flora. As of 2017 it was being developed for ecotourism. The Machalilla National Park is the main conservation unit in the west of Ecuador, protecting remnants of dry and moist forests with many endemic plants and animals. 234 birds species have been found in the park, and 81 mammal species including the endemic fraternal fruit-eating bat (Artibeus fraterculus). However, the limited conservation efforts have not been effective. The remaining habitats are isolated, and need to be connected by corridors to support viable populations. New conservation units are needed to protect all the vulnerable bird species.

== Sources ==
- Baquero, Andrés G., Western South America: Along the Pacific coast of Ecuador (NT0214), WWF: World Wildlife Fund
- Biodiversity Hotspot, Third Millennium Alliance, archived from the original on 2017-03-13
- Dry Forest Ecology, Ceiba Foundation for Tropical Conservation
- Ecuador Dry Tropical Forests, The Nature Conservancy, archived from the original on 2017-04-16
- Lalo Loor Dry Forest Reserve, Ceiba Foundation for Tropical Conservation
- "Ecuadorian dry forests", Global Species, Myers Enterprises II
- Schafer, Kevin, Tumbesian-Andean Valleys Dry Forests, WWF: World Wildlife Fund
- The grand ceiba, Doug Wechsler, 14 January 2016
- WildFinder, WWF: World Wildlife Fund
