= Tumbes–Chocó–Magdalena =

Biodiversity hotspot region on Pacific coast of South America

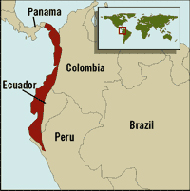
Tumbes-Chocó indicated in red. The lower Magdalena Valley is in north-western Colombia (just north-east of the region marked in red).

Tumbes-Chocó-Magdalena is a biodiversity hotspot, which includes the tropical moist forests and tropical dry forests of the Pacific coast of South America and the Galapagos Islands. The region extends from easternmost Panama to the lower Magdalena Valley of Colombia, and along the Pacific coast of Colombia and Ecuador to the northwestern corner of Peru. Formerly called the Chocó-Darién-Western Ecuador Hotspot, it has been expanded to include several new areas, notably the Magdalena Valley in northern Colombia. It is bounded on the east by the Andes Mountains. The Tumbes-Choco-Magdalena Hotspot is 1,500 km long and encircles 274,597 km^{2}. Tumbes-Choco-Magdalena is near the Pacific Ocean. The factors that threaten Tumbes-Choco-Magdalena are farming encroachment, deforestation, illegal crops, and population growth. Whereas the Panamanian and Colombian portion of the hotspot are relatively intact, approximately 98% of native forest in coastal Ecuador has been cleared, rendering it the most threatened tropical forest in the world. The hotspot includes a wide variety of habitats, ranging from mangroves, beaches, rocky shorelines, and coastal wilderness to some of the world's wettest rain forests in the Colombian Chocó. The hotspot includes a number of ecoregions:

- Chocó–Darién moist forests (Colombia, Ecuador, Panama)
- Ecuadorian dry forests (Ecuador)
- Guayaquil flooded grasslands (Ecuador)
- Gulf of Guayaquil–Tumbes mangroves (Ecuador, Peru)
- Galápagos Islands xeric scrub (Ecuador)
- Magdalena Valley montane forests (Colombia)
- Magdalena–Urabá moist forests (Colombia)
- Manabí mangroves (Ecuador)
- Tumbes–Piura dry forests (Ecuador, Peru)
- Piura mangroves (Peru)
- Western Ecuador moist forests (Colombia, Ecuador)

Some of the endemic species of this hotspot are the following:

Endemic Plant Species: 2,750

Endemic Threatened Birds: 21

Endemic Threatened Mammals: 7

Endemic Threatened Amphibians: 8

Human Population Density (people/km^{2}): 51
