= Cauca Valley dry forests =

Forest in Colambia

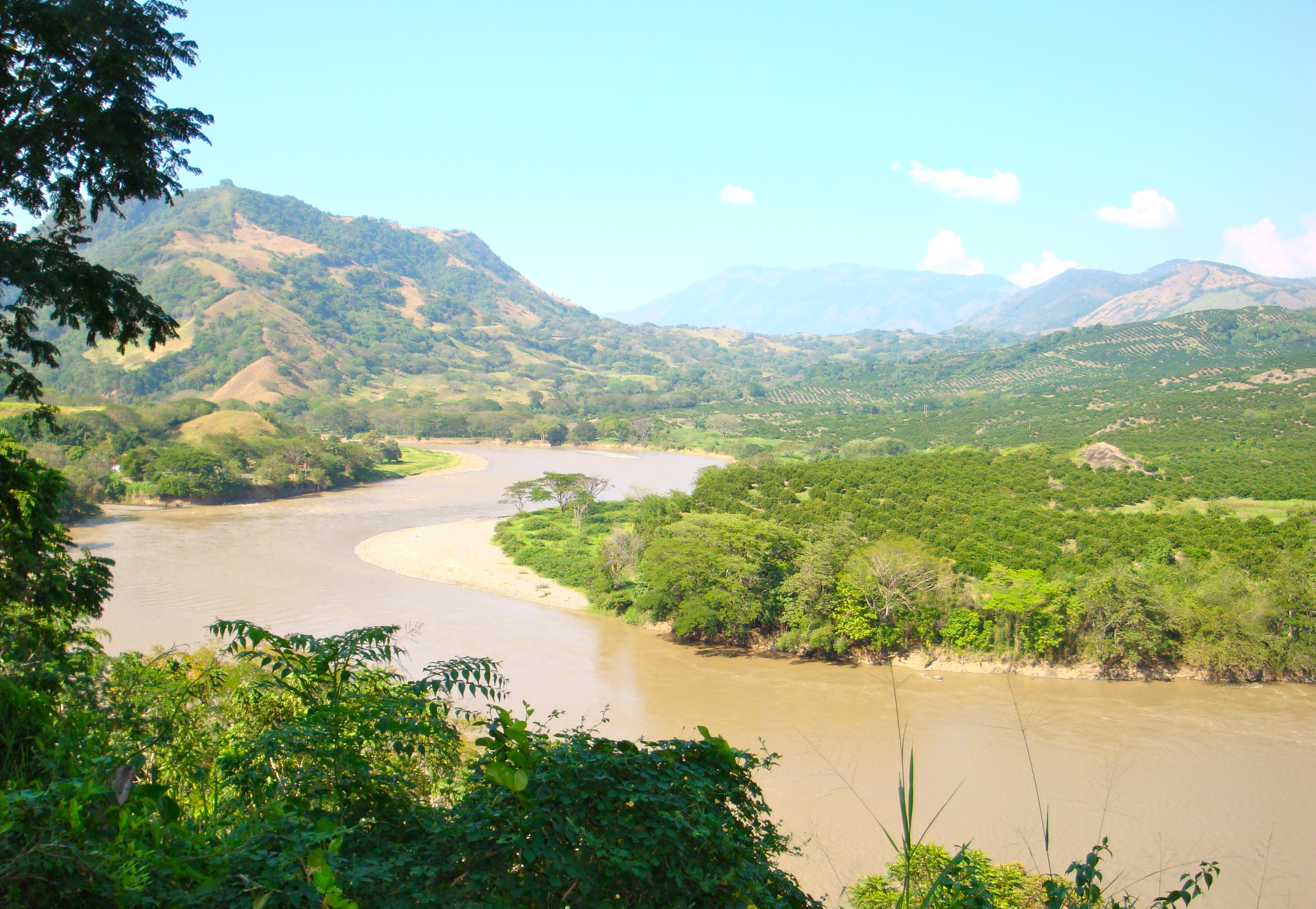
- Cauca River near Tarso, Colombia

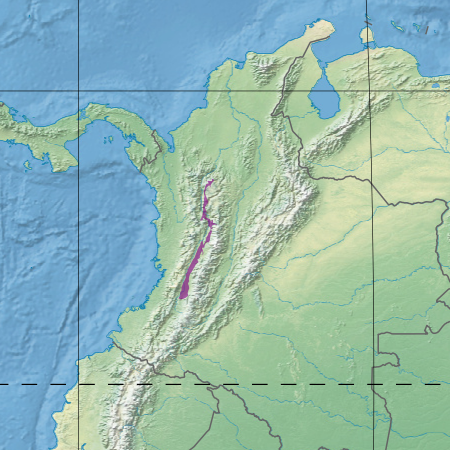
- Ecoregion territory (in purple)

Ecology
- Realm: Neotropical
- Biome: tropical and subtropical dry broadleaf forests

Geography
- Area: 2,800 km^{2} (1,100 mi^{2})
- Country: Colombia
- Coordinates: 03°52′13″N 76°21′13″W

Conservation
- Conservation status: Critically endangered

The Cauca Valley dry forests is a tropical dry broadleaf forest ecoregion in Colombia.

== Location ==
The Cauca Valley dry forests occupies an area of 7,300 square kilometers (2,800 sq mi), extending in a long, narrow strip along the Cauca River. The Cauca Valley is nestled between the Cordillera Occidental and Cordillera Central in the northern Andes. These ranges create a rain shadow, which makes the Cauca Valley drier than the surrounding forests. The Cauca Valley dry forests lie below 1000 meters elevation; the higher slopes are occupied by the distinct Cauca Valley montane forests. Most of these forests have been cleared for agriculture over the years making it one of the most critically endangered ecoregions in Colombia. Laguna de Sonso Nature Reserve has a small area of protected forest.

== Ecology ==
The ecoregion is part of the 103,000 square kilometres (40,000 sq mi) Tumbesian-Andean Valleys Dry Forests global ecoregion, which holds six terrestrial ecoregions: Tumbes–Piura dry forests, Ecuadorian dry forests, Patía Valley dry forests, Magdalena Valley dry forests, Cauca Valley dry forests and Marañón dry forests. The fauna and flora of the global ecoregion have high levels of endemism.

=== Flora ===
The main plant communities are open woodland, deciduous dry forest, evergreen dry forest, riparian forest, arid scrub and wetlands. The natural vegetation has been almost completely displaced by human activities, chiefly agriculture.

=== Fauna ===
Three endemic or near-endemic birds found in the ecoregion are the white-chested swift (Cypseloides lemosi), grayish piculet (Picumnus granadensis), apical flycatcher (Myiarchus apicalis).

== Human use ==
The Cauca Valley dry forests have been mostly converted to agricultural fields. The city of Cali lies in the ecoregion.
