= Tumbes–Piura dry forests =

Arid tropical ecoregion

Tumbes–Piura dry forests (NT0232)
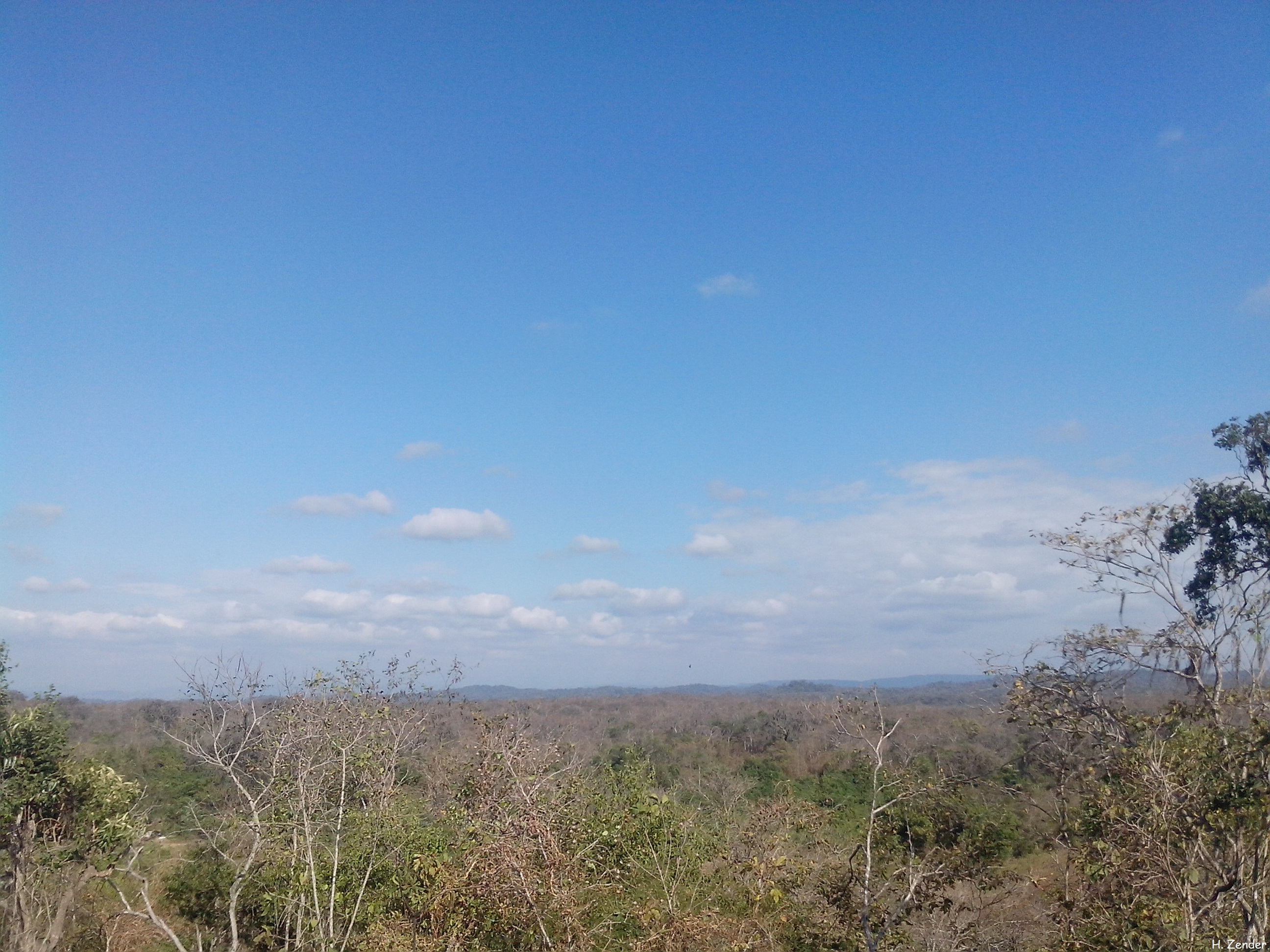
- Tumbes Region dry forest

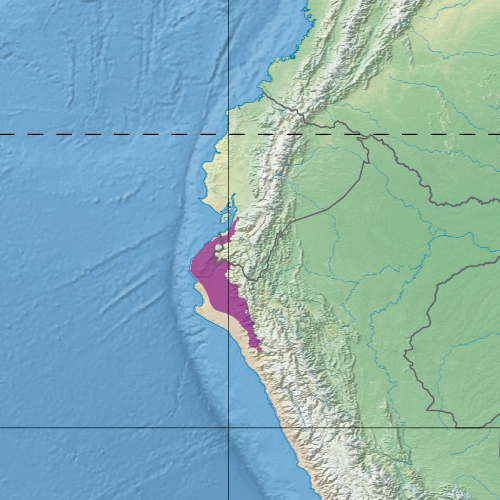
- Ecoregion territory (in purple)

Ecology
- Realm: Neotropical
- Biome: Tropical and subtropical dry broadleaf forests
- Borders: List: Eastern Cordillera Real montane forests; Guayaquil flooded grasslands; Gulf of Guayaquil–Tumbes mangroves; Marañón dry forests; Northwest Andean montane forests; Peruvian yungas; Sechura Desert

Geography
- Area: 41,180 km^{2} (15,900 mi^{2})
- Countries: Ecuador, Peru
- Coordinates: 5.736°S 80.361°W
- Climate type: BWh: arid; desert; hot arid

Conservation
- Conservation status: Critical/endangered
- Global 200: Tumbesian-Andean Valleys Dry Forests

The Tumbes–Piura dry forests (NT0232) is an arid tropical ecoregion along the Pacific coasts of southern Ecuador and northern Peru. The ecoregion contains many endemic species of flora and birds adapted to the short wet season followed by a long dry season. Threats include the extraction of wood for fuel or furniture, and the capture of wild birds for sale.

== Location ==
The Tumbes–Piura dry forests ecoregion has an area of 4,118,081 hectares (10,176,000 acres). The northern tip is in the southern coastal plain of Ecuador, while most of the ecoregion is in the northwestern coastal plain of Peru. It covers all or part of the regions of Tumbes, Piura, Lambayeque and Cajamarca in northern Peru. Further north the similar Ecuadorian dry forests extend along the coast of central Ecuador. The Andes rise to the east.

The northern tip of the ecoregion adjoins the Guayaquil flooded grasslands. In the north it is bounded to the west by a stretch of South American Pacific mangroves and to the east by Northwestern Andean montane forests. Further south the ecoregion reaches the Pacific Ocean to the west, and adjoins Eastern Cordillera Real montane forests to the east. Further south again it is bordered by Sechura Desert to the west and to the east by patches of Marañón dry forests, Peruvian Yungas and Cordillera Central páramo.

== Physical ==
The terrain includes coastal lowlands, low undulating hills and the foothills of the Andes. The soils in the lower regions are mostly sand and clay formed during the recent Holocene epoch. Higher up the soils are made of Precambrian amphibolites, Paleozoic granites, Devonian quartzites and black slate, and Carboniferous dark limestone, sandstone and lutites. The main rivers, which mostly rise in Ecuador and flow throughout the year, are the Guayas, Zarumilla, Tumbes, Piura and Chira rivers. Other streams are seasonal, flowing only in the rainy season.

== Climate ==
The climate is dry. The Köppen climate classification is "BWh": arid; desert; hot arid. Average annual temperature is 24 to 27 °C (75 to 81 °F). At a sample location at coordinates 5.25°S 80.25°W mean annual temperature is just under 24 °C (75 °F), with average maximum of 30 °C (86 °F) and minimum of 18 °C (64 °F). Mean monthly temperatures range from 21.6 °C (70.9 °F) in July–August to 26.9 °C (80.4 °F) in February–March. There is a rainy season from January to March and a marked dry season. Typical annual rainfall is 100 to 500 millimetres (3.9 to 19.7 in). The El Niño–Southern Oscillation is a major event in the region, when rainfall increases and thousands of plants species germinate, providing food for many animal species.

== Ecology ==
The Tumbes–Piura dry forests ecoregion is in the neotropical realm, in the tropical and subtropical dry broadleaf forests biome. It is part of the Tumbes–Chocó–Magdalena biodiversity hotspot, one of 25 biogeographic regions globally that have with a significant reservoir of biodiversity under threat from humans. The ecoregion is part of the 103,000 square kilometres (40,000 sq mi) Tumbesian-Andean Valleys Dry Forests global ecoregion, which holds six terrestrial ecoregions: Tumbes-Piura dry forests, Ecuadorian dry forests, Patía Valley dry forests, Magdalena Valley dry forests, Cauca Valley dry forests and Marañón dry forests. The fauna and flora of the global ecoregion have high levels of endemism.

=== Flora ===
There is a wide range of habitats, including desert areas with shrubs and cactuses and dense thorn forests. Many species of flora are endemic, adapted to the arid conditions. Large areas are covered by seasonal dry forests that lose their leaves after the rainy season. Common species in the dry forests include Loxopterygium huasango, Handroanthus billbergii and holy wood (Bursera graveolens), all threatened by human exploitation. Other common species are Ziziphus thyrsiflora, Caesalpinea corymbosa, Capparis angulata, Bombax discolor, Pitthecellobium multiflorum and Geoffroya striata.

The ceibal forest mainly holds the endemic Ceiba trischistandra. The chaparral is mainly made up of shrubs such as papelillo (Bougainvillea species), cacti and the overo (Cordia lutea). The area is rich in mesquite (Prosopis genus), which capture and fix nitrogen in their roots, enriching the soil and assisting other species. The algarrobal is mainly composed of algarrobo (Prosopis genus).

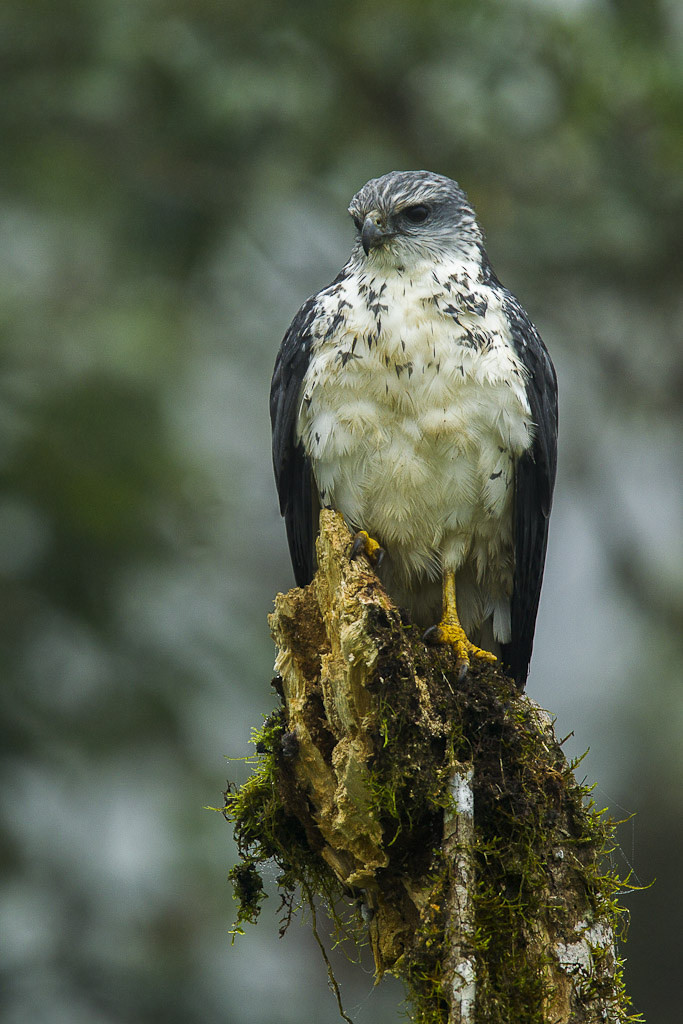
grey-backed hawk (Pseudastur occidentalis) in southern Ecuador

=== Fauna ===
Typical fauna of the Tumbes-Piura dry forests include southern tamandua (Tamandua tetradactyla), Guayaquil squirrel (Sciurus stramineus) and green iguana (Iguana iguana). Endangered reptiles include green sea turtle (Chelonia mydas) and hawksbill sea turtle (Eretmochelys imbricata). The false monitor tegu (Callopistes flavipunctatus) is Near Threatened. Endangered amphibians include phantasmal poison frog (Epipedobates tricolor).

There are 14 orders of birds, with significant endemism. Bird species include El Oro parakeet (Pyrrhura orcesi) and white-edged oriole (Icterus graceannae). Endangered birds include grey-cheeked parakeet (Brotogeris pyrrhoptera), grey-backed hawk (Pseudastur occidentalis), rufous flycatcher (Myiarchus semirufus), slaty becard (Pachyramphus spodiurus), white-winged guan (Penelope albipennis), Peruvian plantcutter (Phytotoma raimondii), El Oro parakeet (Pyrrhura orcesi), yellow-bellied seedeater (Sporophila nigricollis), Peruvian tern (Sternula lorata) and blackish-headed spinetail (Synallaxis tithys). The bronze-winged parrot (Pionus chalcopterus) and saffron siskin (Spinus siemiradzkii) are also endangered. Birds with limited distribution include white-tailed jay (Cyanocorax mystacalis) and red-masked parakeet (Psittacara erythrogenys).

== Status ==
The World Wildlife Foundation gives the ecoregion a status of "Critical/Endangered". In the past, the ecoregion suffered from extract of selected fauna and flora. This included capture of parrots and parakeets for sale as pets, hunting some mammals and reptiles for food, and extraction of wood for firewood, charcoal and timber. As of 2000 some recent improvements had been observed, in part due to El Niño effects and in part to establishment of the Cerros de Amotape National Park. The park management and other groups were working with communities to find ways to maintain biodiversity. Protected areas also include the Reserva del Noroeste biosphere reserve.

== Sources ==
- Biodiversity Hotspot, Third Millennium Alliance
- Ecuador Dry Tropical Forests, The Nature Conservancy
- Arteaga, Alejandro; Bustamante, Lucas; Guayasamin, Juan M. (n.d.), Reptiles of Ecuador, Ecuador: Tropical Herping
- Salcedo, Juan Carlos Riveros, Southwestern Ecuador and Northwestern Peru (NT0232), WWF: World Wildlife Foundation
- Schafer, Kevin, Tumbesian-Andean Valleys Dry Forests, WWF: World Wildlife Fund, archived from the original on 2017-05-30
- "Tumbes-Piura dry forests", Global Species, Myers Enterprises II
- WildFinder, WWF: World Wildlife Fund
