= Magdalena Valley dry forests =

Ecoregion in Colombia

Magdalena Valley dry forests (NT0221)
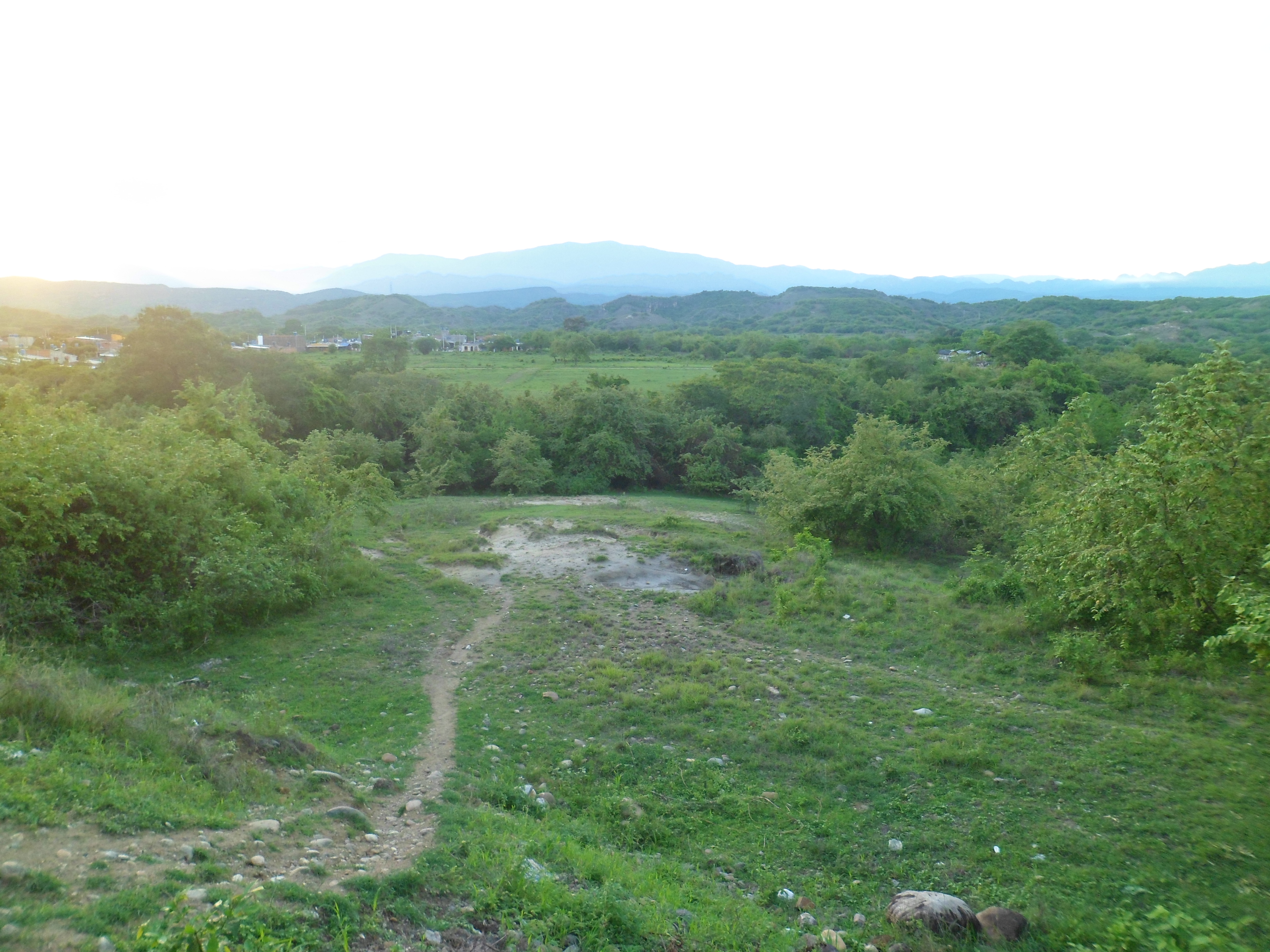
- West of Neiva, Huila, in the south of the dry valley

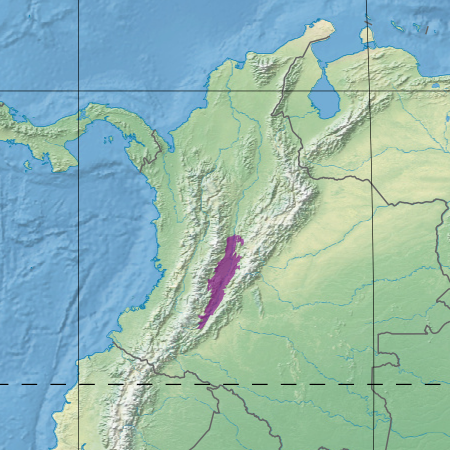
- Ecoregion territory (in purple)

Ecology
- Realm: Neotropical
- Biome: Tropical and subtropical dry broadleaf forests
- Bird species: 297

Geography
- Area: 19,748 km^{2} (7,625 sq mi)
- Countries: Colombia
- Coordinates: 4.0°N 74.98°W
- Geology: Upper Magdalena Valley
- Climate type: Am: equatorial, monsoonal

Conservation
- Conservation status: Critical/endangered

The Magdalena Valley dry forests (NT0221) is an ecoregion in Colombia along the upper Magdalena River, a large river that runs from south to north between the two main cordilleras of the Andes. There are many endemic species, but much of the original habitat has been destroyed by agriculture and over-grazing, mainly by goats. The habitat is not protected by any national park, and is at risk of complete destruction.

== Location ==
The Magdalena Valley dry forests ecoregion is in the valley of the upper Magdalena River, a river that flows north through the Andes to the Caribbean. It has an area of 19,748 square kilometres (7,625 sq mi). The Magdalena River is the largest in Colombia. The dry forests are almost entirely surrounded by the Magdalena Valley montane forests ecoregion. At its northern end the dry valley merges into the Magdalena–Urabá moist forests. It holds a small patch of the Northern Andean páramo ecoregion.

== Terrain ==
The Magdalena River runs from the Central Massif between the Eastern and Central Ranges of the Andes north to the Caribbean. The dry forest is in the upper section. Lower down the river runs through rainforest and then through swamps and wetlands. The average elevation of the dry forest section is 450 metres (1,480 ft). The valley floor is flat, with fertile alluvial soils and large deposits of ash from the Huila and Puracé volcanoes. The dry Tatacoa Desert holds many vertebrate fossils dating from the Miocene era.

The best soils are in areas with piedmont and alluvial valley landscapes, which cover 54.41% of the valley and are irrigated for agriculture. Areas of structural-erosional mountainous landscape cover 18.13% of the area and have no value for farming, so may be conserved as protected areas. Most soils are neither strongly acidic nor alkaline, with pH levels of 5.8–7.5. They have low or very low amounts of organic material, and low to medium levels of phosphorus. 69% of the soils are very susceptible to erosion and these mostly have low or very low natural fertility. Where these soils are not covered by vegetation they may be washed away during the rainy seasons.

== Climate ==
The Köppen climate classification is "Am": equatorial, monsoonal. Annual rainfall in the Magdalena valley ranges from 831 to 2,268 millimetres (32.7 to 89.3 in), distributed over two distinct rainy seasons. The rainy seasons last from April to July and from October to December. There is a water deficiency from April to September. In the Tatacoa Desert there is less than 700 millimetres (28 in) of rain annually. Mean annual temperature is 26.8 °C (80.2 °F). Temperatures rise to about 29.8 °C (85.6 °F) in July and August.

== Ecology ==
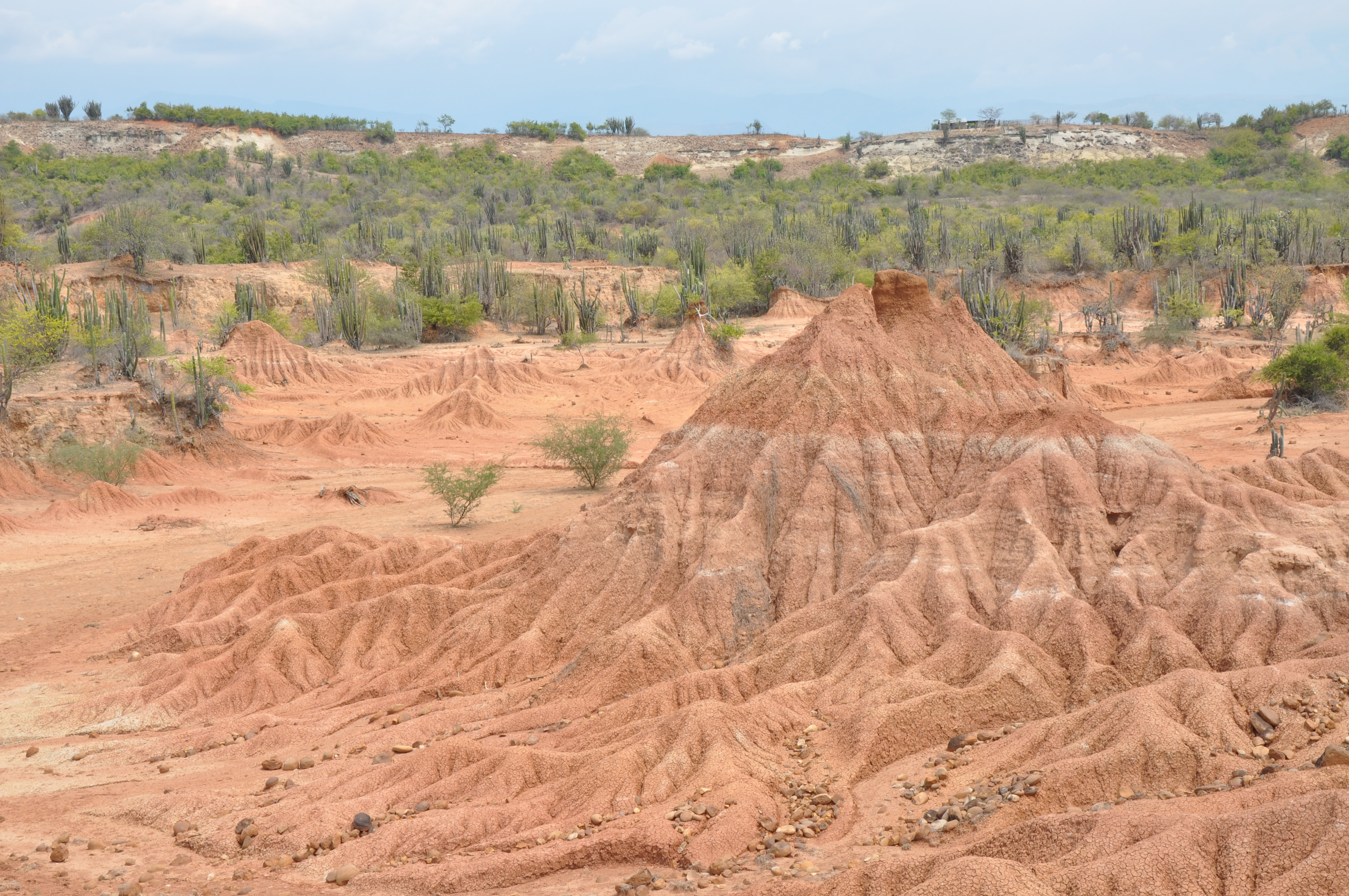
The Tatacoa Desert

The Magdalena Valley dry forests ecoregion is in the neotropical realm, in the tropical and subtropical dry broadleaf forests biome.

=== Relation with other ecoregions ===
The Magdalena Valley dry forests ecoregion is part of the 103,000 square kilometres (40,000 sq mi) Tumbesian-Andean Valleys Dry Forests global ecoregion, which holds six terrestrial ecoregions: Tumbes–Piura dry forests, Ecuadorian dry forests, Patía Valley dry forests, Magdalena Valley dry forests, Cauca Valley dry forests and Marañón dry forests. The fauna and flora of the global ecoregion have high levels of endemism.

The climate has varied during the present Quaternary period as glacial and inter-glacial cycles alternate. In glacial cycles the climate is drier and cooler by 2–8 °C (3.6–14.4 °F). Moist/wet forests retreat to refugia while the dry forests of the Magalena Valley extend to connect with other dry forests in Colombia and Venezuela, although the extremely humid Chocó region may remain a barrier between the northern dry forests and those of Ecuador and Peru. In inter-glacial cycles such as the present the warmer and more humid climate causes the moist forests to expand and dry forests to retreat into refugia. In this model the dry pocket and surrounding forests are considered to be the Alto Magdalena Pleistocene refugium, a paleo-environment and a center of endemism. Many species of plants such as orchids, or birds and butterflies are endemic to the ecoregion.

=== Flora ===
Vegetation in the Tatacoa Desert is thorny, and includes cactus species such as Opuntia and Melocactus species, Armatocereus humilis, Stenocereus griseus, Acanthocereus tetragonus and Pilosocereus colombianus. The dry central pocket also includes umbrella-shaped woody species under 15 metres (49 ft) including Pithecellobium bogotense, Capparis odoratissima, Bulnesia carrapo, Maclura tinctoria, Fagara pterota, Parkinsonia aculeta, Prosopis juliflora and Vachellia farnesiana. Above 2,800 metres (9,200 ft) the vegetation is replaced by montane cloud forest and páramo. Endemic plant species include Steriphoma colombiana, Amaria petiolata and Pithecellobium bogotense. The endemic and highly endangered May flower (Cattleya trianae), the national flower of Colombia, grows in the transition forests between the dry and moist regions.

=== Fauna ===
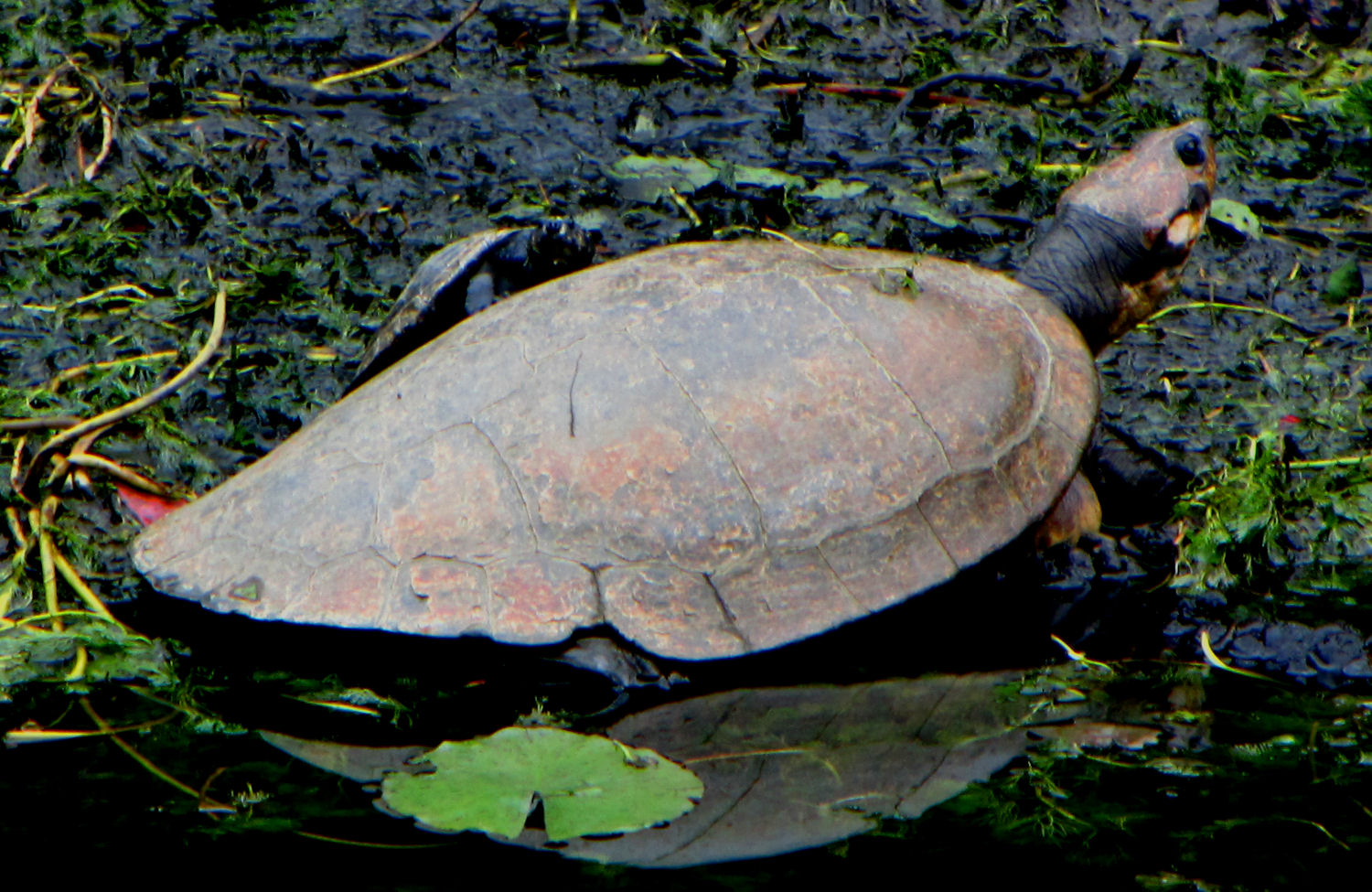
The Magdalena River turtle (Podocnemis lewyana) is critically endangered.

There are some endemic subspecies including the burrowing owl (Athene cunicularia tolimae), crested bobwhite (Colinus cristatus leucotis), velvet-fronted euphonia (Euphonia concinna) and eastern cottontail (Sylvilagus floridanus purgatus). Endangered mammals include the white-footed tamarin (Saguinus leucopus) and the mountain tapir (Tapirus pinchaque). Endangered reptiles include the Magdalena River turtle (Podocnemis lewyana). The region is home to the endangered tropical rattle snake Crotalus durissus. Other endemic or endangered species from the humid forests of the foothills include the Colombian weasel (Mustela felipei).

Species that may be used as a source of income from supplying zoo nurseries, and thus less vulnerable, include red brocket (Mazama americana), white-tailed deer (Odocoileus virginianus), lowland paca (Cuniculus paca), Central American agouti (Dasyprocta punctata), eastern cottontail (Sylvilagus floridanus), tapeti (Sylvilagus brasiliensis), poison dart frog (Dendrobates species), toad (Bufo species), harlequin toad (Atelopus species), tree frog (Hyla species), rain frog (Eleutherodactylus species), foam nest frog (Leptodactylus species), spectacled caiman (Caiman crocodilus), green iguana (Iguana iguana) and boa constrictor (Boa constrictor).

297 birds species have been reported, of which 35 were directly associated with the forest. Migratory birds of the Thraupidae, Parulidae and Accipitridae families pass through the region. The western osprey (Pandion haliaetus) visits the north of the region in the winter. Parrots and hummingbirds migrate from higher regions. Long after it was thought to be extinct and the yellow-eared parrot (Ognorhynchus icterotis) was rediscovered in the region. The blue-billed curassow (Crax alberti) is no longer present. Endangered birds include the recurve-billed bushbird (Clytoctantes alixii).

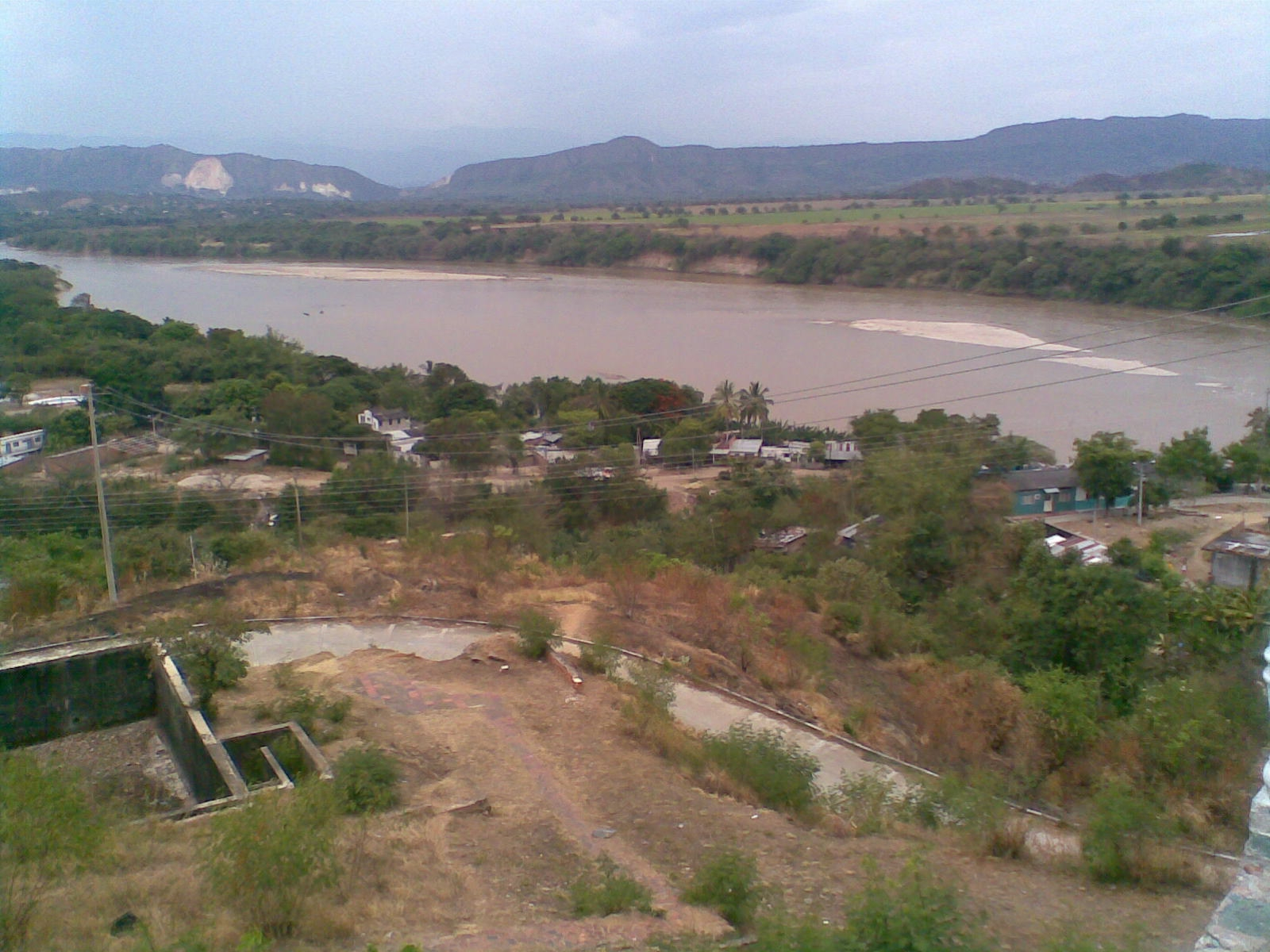
The Magdalena River in Girardot, Cundinamarca, towards the north of the ecoregion

== Status ==
The World Wildlife Fund gives the ecoregion the status of "Critical/Endangered". Much of the original habitat has been destroyed by agriculture and overgrazing, particularly by goats, leaving only a few forest patches along creeks and the Cabrera River in Tolima Department. Drilling and extraction of oil causes pollution around the Tatacoa desert. The population is poor, with limited education, often living in unhygienic conditions in shanty towns around large farms. On flat soils that can be ploughed by tractor the most common type of farming is irrigated rice production, rotated with sorghum and cattle. Other farmers grow rain-fed sorghum with cotton, corn or sheep and cattle, or grow rain-fed sesame plants and fruit trees.

As of 2001, 69% of the area had been transformed by human activity. Of 19,884.5 square kilometres (7,677.4 sq mi) total, 13,785.4 square kilometres (5,322.6 sq mi) had been converted to agricultural use. There were no protected areas. Maps of the region from the early 21st century show about 31 irregular and fragmented remnants of dry forest, with an average size of 155.5 hectares (384 acres). The ecoregion is considered to be at high risk of complete destruction.
