= Guayaquil flooded grasslands =

Ecoregion in Ecuador

Guayaquil flooded grasslands (NT0905)
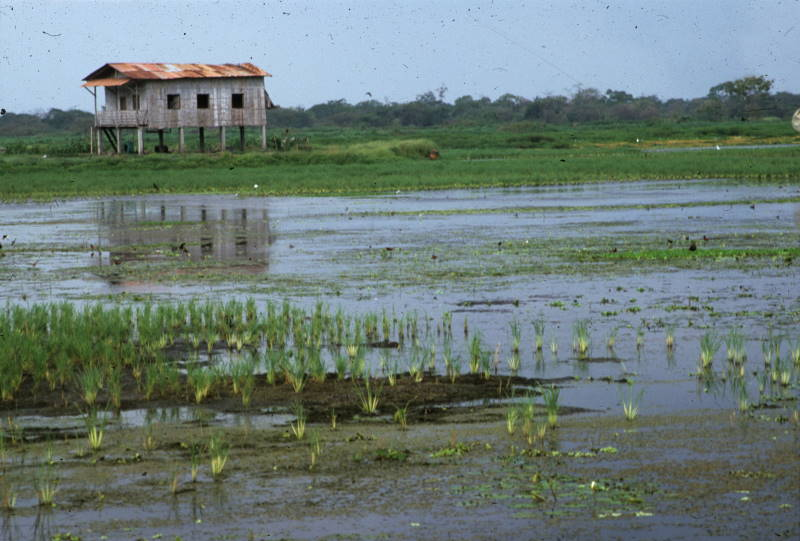
- Flooded grasslands between Duran and Virgen de Fatima, Ecuador

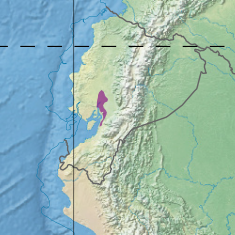
- Ecoregion territory (in purple)

Ecology
- Realm: Neotropical
- Biome: Flooded grasslands and savannas

Geography
- Area: 2,850 km^{2} (1,100 mi^{2})
- Countries: Ecuador
- Coordinates: 1.92°S 79.66°W
- Climate type: Aw: equatorial, dry winter

The Guayaquil flooded grasslands (NT0905) is an ecoregion near the Pacific coast of the Ecuador. The ecoregion is critically endangered due to conversion into agricultural land.

== Location ==
The Guayaquil flooded grasslands ecoregion is in the southwest of Ecuador in the delta of the Guayas River, extending south to the mangroves of the Gulf of Guayaquil. It covers an area of 284,898 hectares (704,000 acres). The Guayaquil flooded grasslands adjoin the Western Ecuador moist forests ecoregion to the west and north, and a section of the Ecuadorian dry forests ecoregion to the east. To the southeast they merge into the South American Pacific mangroves ecoregion. The extreme south adjoins the Tumbes–Piura dry forests.

== Physical ==
The Köppen climate classification is "Aw": equatorial, dry winter. In a sample location at coordinates 2.25°S 79.75°W temperatures are fairly constant throughout the year, slightly cooler in July and slightly warmer in April. Yearly average minimum temperatures are 21 °C (70 °F) and maximum 33 °C (91 °F), with a mean of 26 °C (79 °F). Monthly precipitation ranges from less than 10 millimetres (0.39 in) in July–November to 265 millimetres (10.4 in) in March. Total annual precipitation is about 1,200 millimetres (47 in).

== Ecology ==
The Guayaquil flooded grasslands are in the neotropical realm, in the flooded grasslands and savannas biome.

The grasslands are seasonally flooded, and also hold riparian flora. Endangered birds include yellow-bellied seedeater (Sporophila nigricollis) and Peruvian tern (Sternula lorata). Endangered reptiles include green sea turtle (Chelonia mydas) and hawksbill sea turtle (Eretmochelys imbricata).

== Status ==
The World Wildlife Fund gives the ecoregion a status of "Critical/Endangered". Threats come from the steady growth of the human population and large-scale irrigation programs for agriculture. As of 2000 the 2,974.5 square kilometres (1,148.5 sq mi) flooded grasslands ecoregion had 949.9 square kilometres (366.8 sq mi), or 31.9%, natural cover with extractive use, and 2,024.7 square kilometres (781.7 sq mi) of agricultural land. A 2006 book said the 2,883.50 square kilometres (1,113.33 sq mi) ecoregion had protected areas of 56.8 square kilometres (21.9 sq mi), or 2%. 67.1% of the area had been transformed.

== Sources ==
- de Ferranti, David M. (1 January 2005), Beyond the City: The Rural Contribution to Development, World Bank Publications, ISBN 978-0-8213-6097-2
- Elao, Carmen Bonifaz de, Western South America: Western Ecuador (NT0905), WWF: World Wildlife Fund
- "Guayaquil flooded grasslands", Global Species, Myers Enterprises II
- WildFinder, WWF: World Wildlife Fund
- Zimmerer, Karl S. (15 September 2006), Globalization and New Geographies of Conservation, University of Chicago Press, ISBN 978-0-226-98344-8
