= Patía Valley dry forests =

Ecoregion in Colombia

Patía Valley dry forests (NT0225)
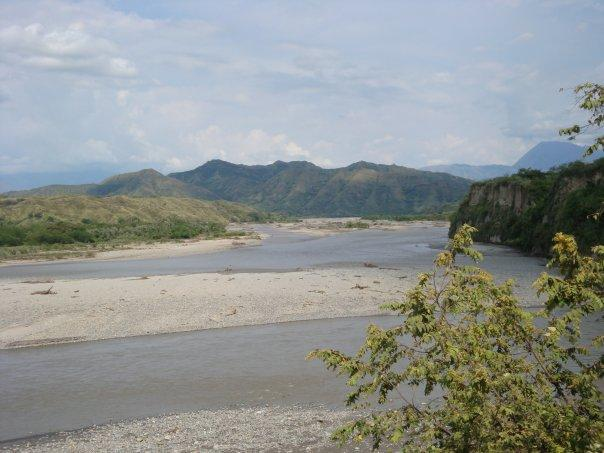
- Landscape of the Patía Valley in Cauca Department

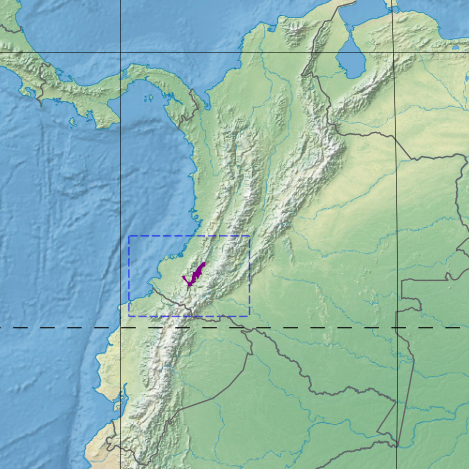
- Ecoregion territory (in purple)

Ecology
- Realm: Neotropical
- Biome: Tropical and subtropical dry broadleaf forests

Geography
- Area: 2,331 km^{2} (900 mi^{2})
- Countries: Colombia
- Coordinates: 1.956°N 77.128°W
- Climate type: As: equatorial; summer dry

The Patía Valley dry forests (NT0225) is an ecoregion in southwestern Colombia. It covers a dry valley surrounded by mountains. The original habitat has mostly been destroyed by human activity, although a few pockets remain.

== Location ==
The Patía Valley is in southwestern Colombia along the Patía River and its tributaries, surrounded by ranges of the Andes. It has an area of 233,098 hectares (576,000 acres). It is almost completely surrounded by the Northwestern Andean montane forests ecoregion. The western extension downstream along the Patía River merges into the Chocó–Darién moist forests ecoregion.

== Physical ==
The Patía river flows westward from the Central massif of Colombia, cuts through the Western Cordillera and drains into the Pacific Ocean. In its upper section it runs through cloud forests and montane forests. The central section of the river forms the Patía dry valley. The lower section to the west of the Western Cordillera flows through the Chocó jungles of the Pacific region. The Patía is fed by the Quilcacé, Guachicono, Mayo, Juanambú, Pasto and Guaitara rivers. Average elevation is 600 to 900 metres (2,000 to 3,000 ft). The soils are sedimentary in origin, with areas of ash from the Puracé and Sotará volcanoes.

== Climate ==
The Köppen climate classification is "As": equatorial; summer dry. There are rainy seasons from October to November and from April to June. Mean annual rainfall is under 900 millimetres (35 in).

At a sample location in the mountains to the south at coordinates 1.75°N 77.25°W the mean monthly temperature is almost constant at just over 20 °C (68 °F) throughout the year. Annual rainfall is about 1,750 millimetres (69 in). Monthly rainfall varies from 50.4 millimetres (1.98 in) in July to 221 millimetres (8.7 in) in November, with a second peak of 199.2 millimetres (7.84 in) in April.

== Ecology ==
The Patía Valley dry forests ecoregion is in the neotropical realm, in the tropical and subtropical dry broadleaf forests biome. The valley has been isolated from similar dry forests areas for long enough for unique flora and fauna to evolve. The ecoregion is part of the 103,000 square kilometres (40,000 sq mi) Tumbesian-Andean Valleys Dry Forests global ecoregion, which holds six terrestrial ecoregions: Tumbes–Piura dry forests, Ecuadorian dry forests, Patía Valley dry forests, Magdalena Valley dry forests, Cauca Valley dry forests and Marañón dry forests. The fauna and flora of the global ecoregion have high levels of endemism.

=== Flora ===
Ranching and farming, with fire used to clear the land, have destroyed almost all the original vegetation. There are some endemic sub-species. Common plants in the dry valley now include Crescentia cujete, Guazuma ulmifolia, Cassia fistula, Bursera graveolens, Spondias mombin, Bauhinia picta, Ceiba pentandra and Gliricidia sepium. The cactus Pilosocereus colombianus is found in some place, as are Opuntia species The orchid Schomburgkia splendida grows in rocky places.

=== Fauna ===
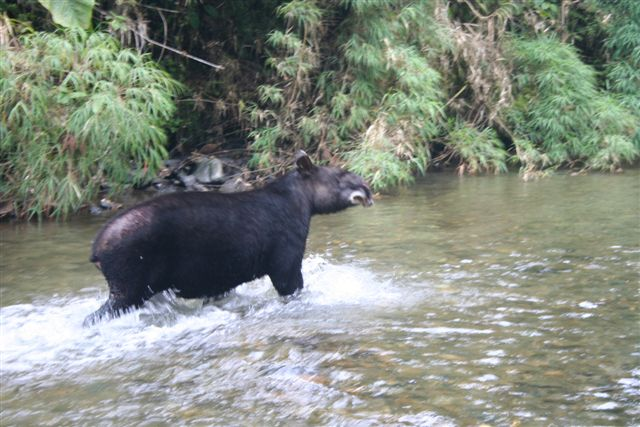
Mountain tapir (Tapirus pinchaque)

There are no endemic species, but some endemic sub-species of birds and butterflies, including the steely-vented hummingbird (Amazilia saucerottei australis). Until recently there were many mammals. Remote parts of the valley are still home to collared peccary (Pecari tajacu), red brocket (Mazama americana), Central American agouti (Dasyprocta punctata), ocelot (Leopardus pardalis) and cougar (Puma concolor). A population of Andean condor (Vultur gryphus) once nested on the steep walls of the Juanambú and Guaitara rivers, but that species is no longer found in the region. Endangered mammals include Baird's tapir (Tapirus bairdii) and mountain tapir (Tapirus pinchaque).

== Status ==
The World Wildlife Fund gives the Patía Valley dry forests ecoregion the status "Critical/Endangered". Most of the valley has been drastically modified by human activity, but there are still pockets of original vegetation and there are some efforts at conservation on privately owned land. Threats come from excessive hunting and collection of firewood, urban sprawl, agriculture, livestock and road construction.

== Sources ==
- Constantino, Emilio, South America: Colombia (NT0225), WWF: World Wildlife Fund
- "Patía Valley dry forests", Global Species, Myers Enterprises II
- Schafer, Kevin, Tumbesian-Andean Valleys Dry Forests, WWF: World Wildlife Fund, archived from the original on 2017-05-30
- WildFinder, WWF: World Wildlife Fund
