= Marañón dry forests =

Ecoregion of Peru

Marañón dry forests (NT0223)
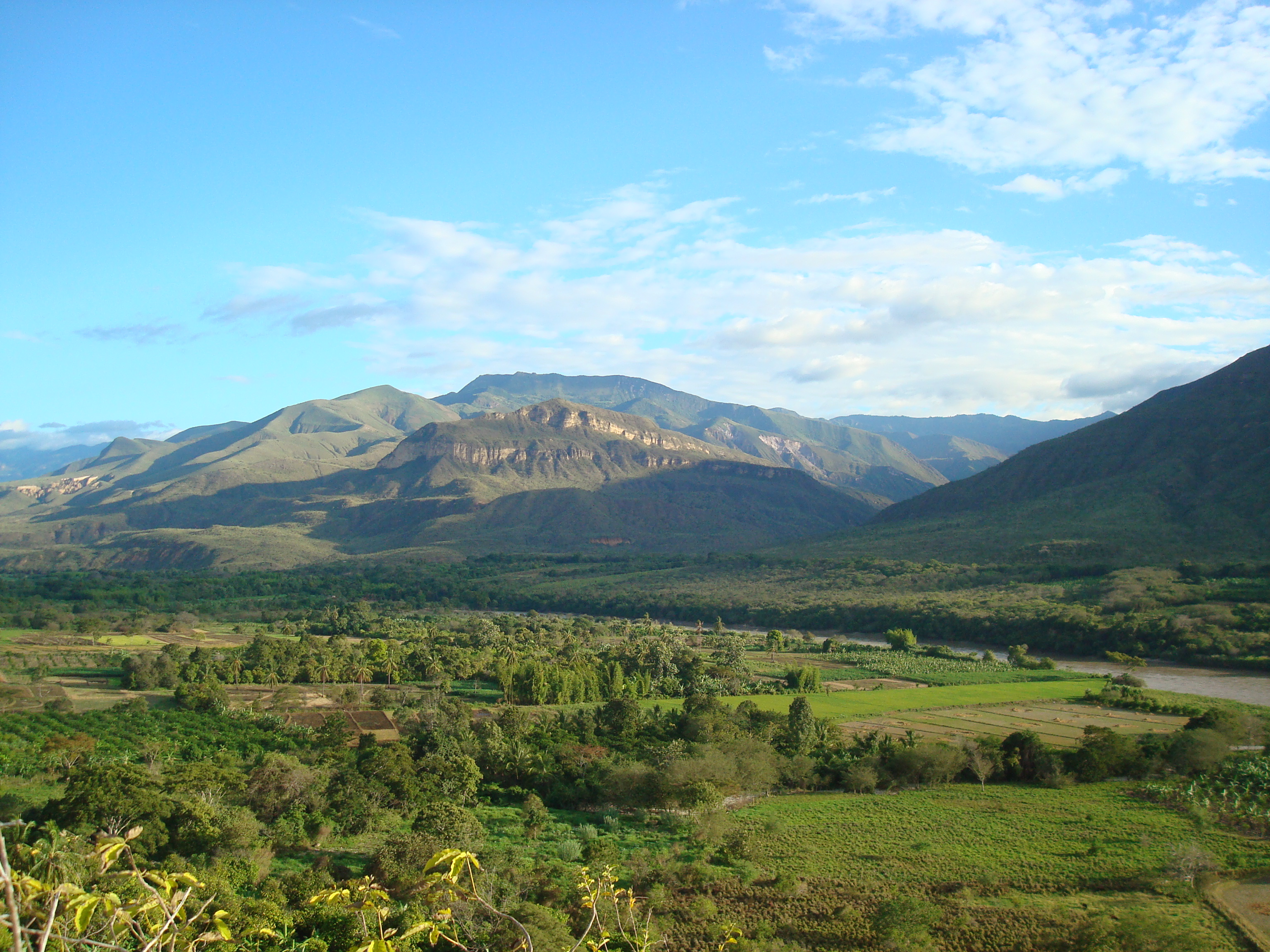
- River valley near Tactago in Cumba District

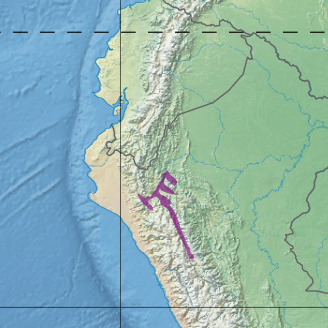
- Ecoregion territory (in purple)

Ecology
- Realm: Neotropical
- Biome: Tropical and subtropical dry broadleaf forests

Geography
- Area: 11,396 km^{2} (4,400 sq mi)
- Countries: Peru
- Coordinates: 5.94°S 78.67°W
- Climate type: Cfb: warm temperate; fully humid; warm summer.

The Marañón dry forests (NT0223) is an ecoregion in northern Peru. It covers the lower valley of the Marañón River and its tributaries along the eastern edge of the Andes. It has a dry climate due to rain shadow from mountains further east. The habitat has long been modified by farming, ranching and logging and is now threatened by construction of hydroelectric and irrigation dams.

== Location ==
The Marañón dry forests ecoregion in northwestern Peru has an area of 1,139,594 hectares (2,816,000 acres). It extends along the upper valley of the Marañón River and its tributaries. To the north the ecoregion adjoins the Eastern Cordillera Real montane forests. The northern part of the ecoregion extends from the Tumbes–Piura dry forests in the west to the Ucayali moist forests in the east. The ecoregion extends to the southeast through the Peruvian Yungas and patches of the Cordillera Central páramo.

== Physical ==
The Marañón River rises on the Nevado de Yapura glacier, and runs northwest through northern Peru between the western and eastern cordilleras of the Andes. It then turns northeast, breaks through the mountains and flows into the Amazon lowlands, where it meets the Ucayali River and forms the Amazon River.

The ecoregion's most southern part is in the Tayabamba District to the west of the Rio Abiseo National Park. It extends downstream along the river valley in a northwest direction to the region south of Jaén where it is joined by the Chamaya River and turns to the northeast. It includes the valley of the Chotano River, which flows northwest parallel to and west of the Marañó. The Chotano joins the Huancabamba River to form the Chamaya below Pucará. The Chamaya flows northeast to join the Marañó. Beyond Jaén the ecoregion extends along the southeast bank of the Marañó, and includes the valleys of the Utcubamba and Chiriaco rivers, which enter the Marañó from the southeast, and the eastern part of Cordillera de Colán National Sanctuary in the Chiriaco valley.

== Climate ==
The ecoregion has a dry climate caused by the rain shadow from the mountains to the east. The Köppen climate classification is "Cfb": warm temperate; fully humid; warm summer. The valleys of the Utcubamba, Chamaya and Maranon rivers have similar climates. At elevations above 700 metres (2,300 ft) the mean annual temperature is 24.8 to 25.4 °C (76.6 to 77.7 °F) and mean annual precipitation is 567 to 1,019 millimetres (22.3 to 40.1 in). At elevations below 600 metres (2,000 ft) the mean annual temperature is 23.4 to 25 °C (74.1 to 77.0 °F) and mean annual precipitation is 162 to 793 millimetres (6.4 to 31.2 in).

At a sample location at coordinates 6.25°S 78.25°W yearly mean temperature averages 15 °C (59 °F), with an average low of 7 °C (45 °F) and high of 23 °C (73 °F). Mean monthly temperatures range from 14 to 15.2 °C (57.2 to 59.4 °F). Average total rainfall is about 670 millimetres (26 in). Average monthly rainfall varies from 7.3 millimetres (0.29 in) in July to 108.3 millimetres (4.26 in) in March.

== Ecology ==
The Marañón dry forests ecoregion is in the neotropical realm, in the tropical and subtropical dry broadleaf forests biome. The ecoregion is part of the 103,000 square kilometres (40,000 sq mi) Tumbesian-Andean Valleys Dry Forests global ecoregion, which holds six terrestrial ecoregions: Tumbes–Piura dry forests, Ecuadorian dry forests, Patía Valley dry forests, Magdalena Valley dry forests, Cauca Valley dry forests and Marañón dry forests. The fauna and flora of the global ecoregion have high levels of endemism.

=== Flora ===
The ecoregion holds seasonally dry tropical deciduous forest and arid or riparian scrub. Botanically it is the richest of the inter-Andean valleys, with 184 woody plant species. Characteristic species include Acacia macracantha, Athyana weinntanniifolia, Ceiba insignis, Cordia iguaguana, Cyathostegia mathewsii, Eriotheca discolor, Eriotheca peruviana, Geoffroea spinosa, Hura crepitans, Krameria lappacea, Llagunoa nitida, Parkinsonia praecox, Praecereus euchlorus and Rauhocereus riosaniensis. 69 species are endemic to Peru and many are found only in small, isolated areas. These include Browningia riosaniensis, Praecereus euchlorus, Coursetia cajamarcana and Coursetia maraniona. Recently described species include Parkinsonia peruviana, Ruprechtia aperta and Ruprechtia albida, as well as the new genus Maraniona.

=== Fauna ===
Endangered amphibians include the painted frog (Atelopus pachydermus). There is a high level of endemism among birds, with 22 species of restricted-range, of which 11 are endemic. Endangered birds include the yellow-bellied seedeater (Sporophila nigricollis) and Marañón spinetail (Synallaxis maranonica).

== Status ==
The area has long been affected by agriculture, cattle ranching and logging. Plans to build a series of 20 hydroelectric and/or irrigation dams on the Marañón River were announced by President Alan García in April 2011. 18 of the dams would be in environmentally sensitive areas, include the dry forests, and would displace indigenous people and other farmers and fishermen along the river.

== Sources ==
- Locklin, Claudia, Western Peru, in the upper Marañon River (NT0223), WWF: World Wildlife Fund
- "Marañón dry forests", Global Species, Myers Enterprises II
- Marañón River, International Rivers
- Pennington, R. Toby; Ratter, James A. (25 May 2006), Neotropical Savannas and Seasonally Dry Forests: Plant Diversity, Biogeography, and Conservation, CRC Press, ISBN 978-1-4200-0449-6
- Schafer, Kevin, Tumbesian-Andean Valleys Dry Forests, WWF: World Wildlife Fund
- WildFinder, WWF: World Wildlife Fund
