= Laguna de Sonso Nature Reserve =

Nature reserve in Valle del Cauca Department, Colombia

Laguna de Sonso
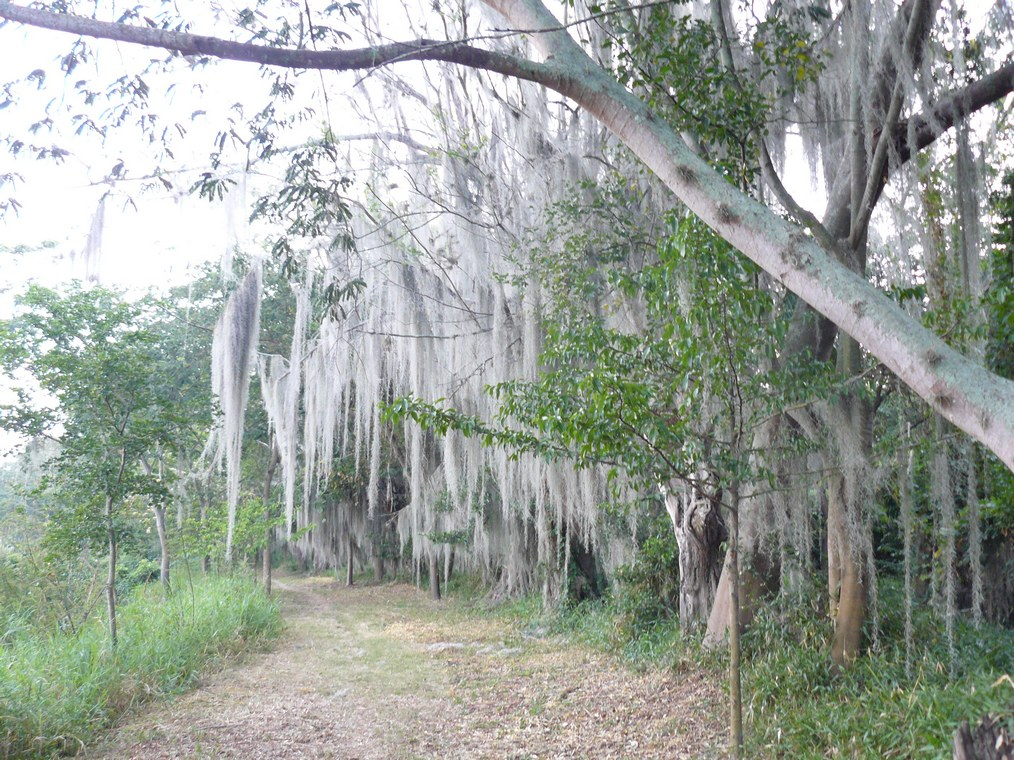

- Location within Colombia
- Location: Valle del Cauca, Colombia
- Nearest city: Buga
- Coordinates: 3°52′12″N 76°2′13″W
- Area: 2,045 ha (7.90 sq mi)
- Established: 1978
- Governing body: CVC

Ramsar Wetland
- Official name: Complejo de Humedales del Alto Rio Cauca Asociado a la Laguna de Sonso
- Designated: 14 February 2017
- Reference no.: 2403

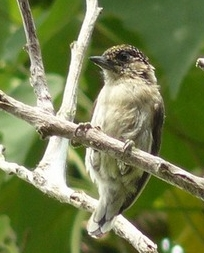
Grayish piculet

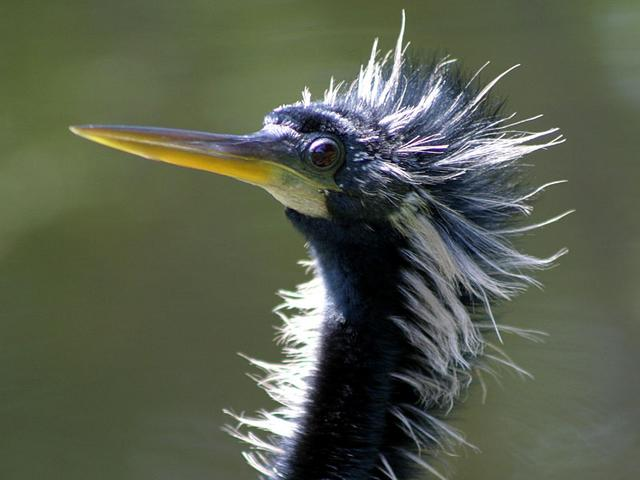
Anhinga

The Laguna de Sonso Nature Reserve is located in the Valle del Cauca Department of Colombia. It contains the last extensive remnant of original natural wetland remaining in the Cauca River Valley in western Colombia, and was declared a nature reserve in October 1978. It comprises a series of marshes and lagoons on the east bank of the Cauca River, between the municipalities of Buga, Yotoco and Guacarí. It has an area of 2,045 ha (7.90 sq mi), lying at an altitude of 935 m (3,068 ft). The wetlands are affected by the introduced water hyacinth. The reserve has been designated as a protected Ramsar site since 2017.

== Fauna ==
Birds recorded from the reserve include the fulvous whistling duck, blue-winged teal, osprey, wattled jacana, black-necked stilt, cocoi heron, striated heron, anhinga and neotropic cormorant. Of special interest are the grayish piculet, apical flycatcher, bar-crested antshrike and the scrub tanager. The reserve also supports the only remaining population of the horned screamer in the region.

Mammals found there include common opossum, Pallas's long-tongued bat, common vampire bat, tapeti, capybara, and nine-banded armadillo. There are also cane toads and common snapping turtles, as well as several native and introduced fish species which provide the basis of a local fishing industry, including the native Prochilodus magdalenae which uses the wetlands for spawning.
