= Grey-headed antbird =

Conservation status
- Near Threatened (IUCN 3.1)

Scientific classification
- Kingdom: Animalia
- Phylum: Chordata
- Class: Aves
- Order: Passeriformes
- Family: Thamnophilidae
- Genus: Ampelornis; Isler, Bravo & Brumfield, 2013
- Species: A. griseiceps

Binomial name
- Ampelornis griseiceps (Chapman, 1923)

Synonyms
- Myrmeciza griseiceps

Species of bird

The grey-headed antbird (Ampelornis griseiceps) is a near threatened species of bird in the subfamily Thamnophilinae of the family Thamnophilidae, the "typical antbirds". It is found in Ecuador and Peru.

== Taxonomy and systematics ==
The American ornithologist Frank Chapman described the grey-headed antbird in 1923 and given the binomial name Myrmoderus griseiceps. It was later placed in genus Myrmeciza, but a molecular phylogenetic study published in 2013 found that the genus Myrmeciza, as then defined, was polyphyletic. The gray-headed antbird was moved to a newly erected genus, Ampelornis, in the resulting rearrangement to create monophyletic genera. The name combines the Ancient Greek words ampelos, "vine," and ornis, "bird." The genus is monotypic.

== Description ==
The grey-headed antbird is 12.5 to 13.5 cm (4.9 to 5.3 in) long and weighs about 15 g (0.53 oz). Adult males have a gray head, neck, and mantle. The rest of their upperparts are olive-brown with a white patch between their scapulars. Their flight feathers are dark brownish gray with pale brown edges; their wing coverts are black with wide white tips. Their tail is dark brownish gray with white tips on the feathers. The center of their lower throat and breast is black, the rest of their breast and belly are gray, and their flanks, vent area, and undertail coverts are olive-brown. Adult females have a paler gray head than males. Their throat and breast are streaked gray or olive-gray on white, and their belly is whiter than the male's. Their back and the rest of their underparts are like the male's. Subadult males resemble adult females.

== Distribution and habitat ==
The grey-headed antbird is found in far southwestern Ecuador's El Oro and Loja provinces, into northwestern Peru, and in the departments of Lambayeque and Cajamarca. It inhabits the understorey of montane evergreen forest and the ecotone between it and deciduous forest. It is often associated with bamboo, but not confined to it. In elevation, it ranges between 600 and 2,500 m (2,000 and 8,200 ft) in Ecuador and 700 and 2,900 m (2,300 and 9,500 ft) in Peru.

== Behavior ==
=== Movement ===
The grey-headed antbird is believed to be a year-round resident throughout its range.

=== Feeding ===
The gray-headed antbird feeds primarily on insects and probably includes other arthropods in its diet. Individuals, pairs, and family groups forage in dense vegetation, usually between 2 and 7 m (7 and 23 ft) above the ground. It hops, makes short flutter-flights between perches, and takes prey by gleaning from leaves, stems, and vines. It sometimes joins mixed-species feeding flocks.

=== Breeding ===
The gray-headed antbird's breeding season appears from January to May, but nothing else is known about its breeding biology.

=== Vocalization ===
The grey-headed antbird's song is "a short, rapid, descending series of churred notes: CHEER'R'r'r'r'r'ew" and its call "a harsh, whining rheer-rhurr".

== Status ==
The IUCN originally in 1988 assessed the grey-headed antbird as Threatened, then as Endangered in 1994, since 2000 as Vulnerable, and since 2024 as Near Threatened. It has a somewhat limited range, and its estimated population of between 2500 and 10,000 mature individuals is believed to be decreasing. "Significant habitat loss is ongoing, at least in unprotected areas, and will soon remove almost all extant lowland forest unless effective action is taken urgently." It is considered rare to uncommon throughout its range. It is known from one protected area in each country. "Further investigation into its ecology would help to clarify its true micro-habitat needs, particularly concerning the relative importance of bamboo; this could influence decisions on habitat preservation and management."
