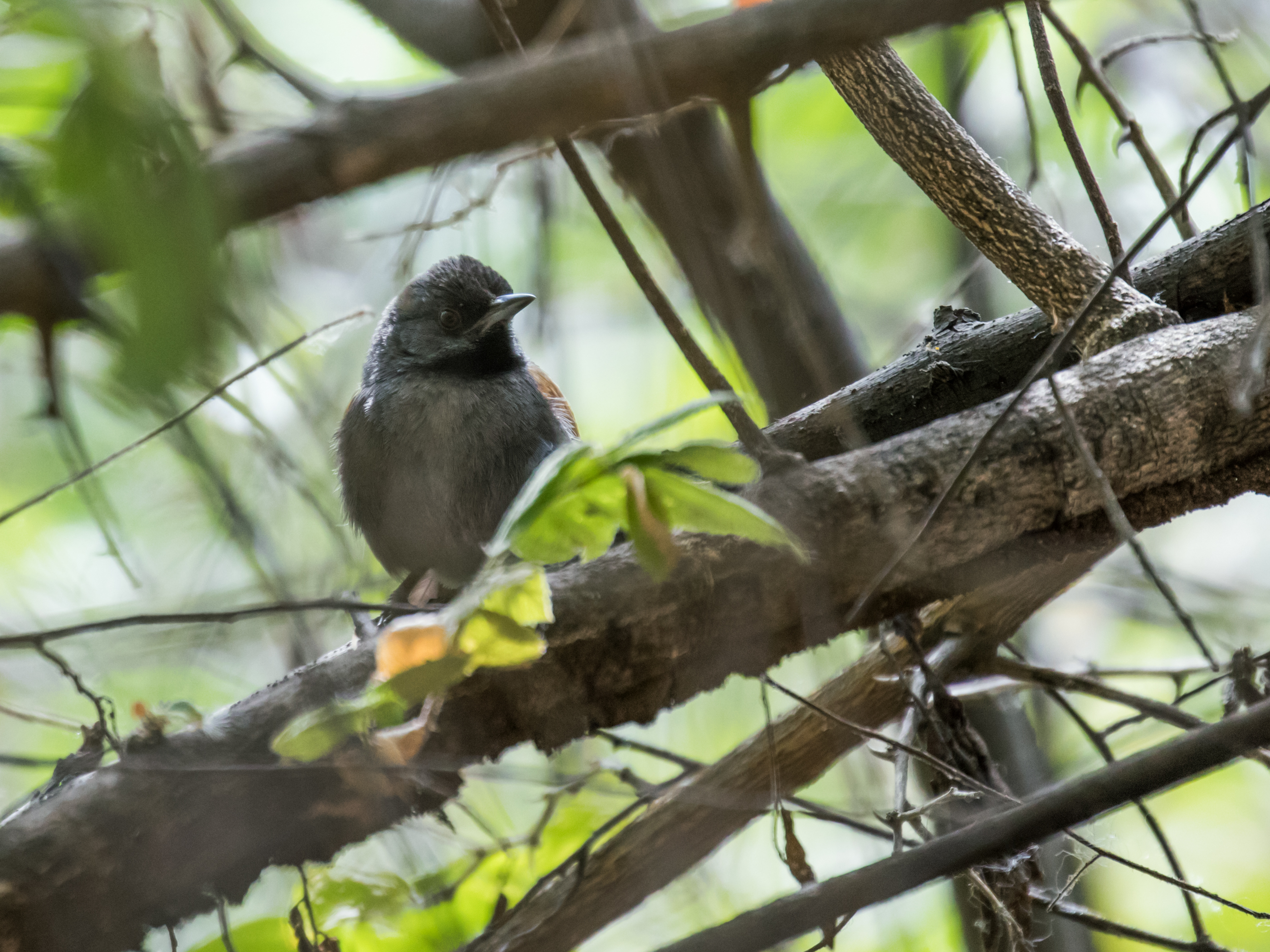

Conservation status
- Vulnerable (IUCN 3.1)

Scientific classification
- Kingdom: Animalia
- Phylum: Chordata
- Class: Aves
- Order: Passeriformes
- Family: Furnariidae
- Genus: Synallaxis
- Species: S. tithys

Binomial name
- Synallaxis tithys Taczanowski, 1877

= Blackish-headed spinetail =

Species of bird

The blackish-headed spinetail (Synallaxis tithys) is a Vulnerable species of bird in the Furnariinae subfamily of the ovenbird family Furnariidae. It is found in Ecuador and Peru.

== Taxonomy and systematics ==
The blackish-headed spinetail is monotypic.

== Description ==
The blackish-headed spinetail is 14.5 to 17 cm (5.7 to 6.7 in) long and weighs 14 to 18 g (0.49 to 0.63 oz). The sexes have the same plumage. Adults have a mostly black face with some whitish grizzling on the cheeks. Their forecrown is black, their hindcrown and upper back dark gray, and their rump and uppertail coverts dark brownish. Their wing coverts are tawny-rufous and their flight feathers dark fuscous with rufescent brown edges. Their chin is blackish and their throat black. Their underparts are mostly gray with a paler belly and an olive tinge to the flanks and undertail coverts. Their iris is reddish brown to gray-brown, their maxilla black to dark gray, their mandible blue-gray to gray, and their legs and feet gray or pale gray to bluish horn. Juveniles are more olivaceous than adults, with an ill-defined black forehead and gray mottling on their underparts.

== Distribution and habitat ==
The blackish-headed spinetail is found from Manabí and Loja provinces in southwestern Ecuador south into the departments of Tumbes and Piura in far northwestern Peru. It inhabits the undergrowth of tropical deciduous forest, secondary forest, and adjacent scrublands. In elevation it ranges from near sea level to almost 1,300 m (4,300 ft).

== Behavior ==
- Movement

The blackish-headed spinetail is considered a year-round resident throughout its range but there is some slight evidence of elevational movements.

- Feeding

The blackish-headed spinetail feeds on arthropods. It usually forages in pairs and only rarely joins mixed-species feeding flocks. It gleans prey from leaf litter, foliage, and small branches in dense cover up to about 2 m (7 ft) above the ground.

- Breeding

The blackish-headed spinetail is thought to breed during the January to April rainy season. Its nest is a ball of sticks typically placed about 3 to 7 m (10 to 23 ft) up in vine tangles. Nothing else is known about its breeding biology.

- Vocalization

The blackish-headed spinetail's song is "a short, dry, ascending trill, 't-t-t-t-t-tit' " that it repeats every few seconds. "Excited birds can give a 'weé-di weé-di weé-di' series."

== Status ==
The IUCN originally in 1994 assessed the blackish-headed spinetail as Vulnerable, then in 2000 as Endangered, and since 2017 again as Vulnerable. It has a limited range and its estimated population of between 2500 and 10,000 mature individuals is believed to be decreasing. "All forest-types within its range have greatly diminished owing to agricultural clearance. Persistent grazing by goats and cattle removes understorey, prevents forest regeneration and is a serious current threat." It is considered local in Ecuador and common to fairly common in Peru's Tumbes National Reserve. It also occurs in some protected areas in Ecuador.
