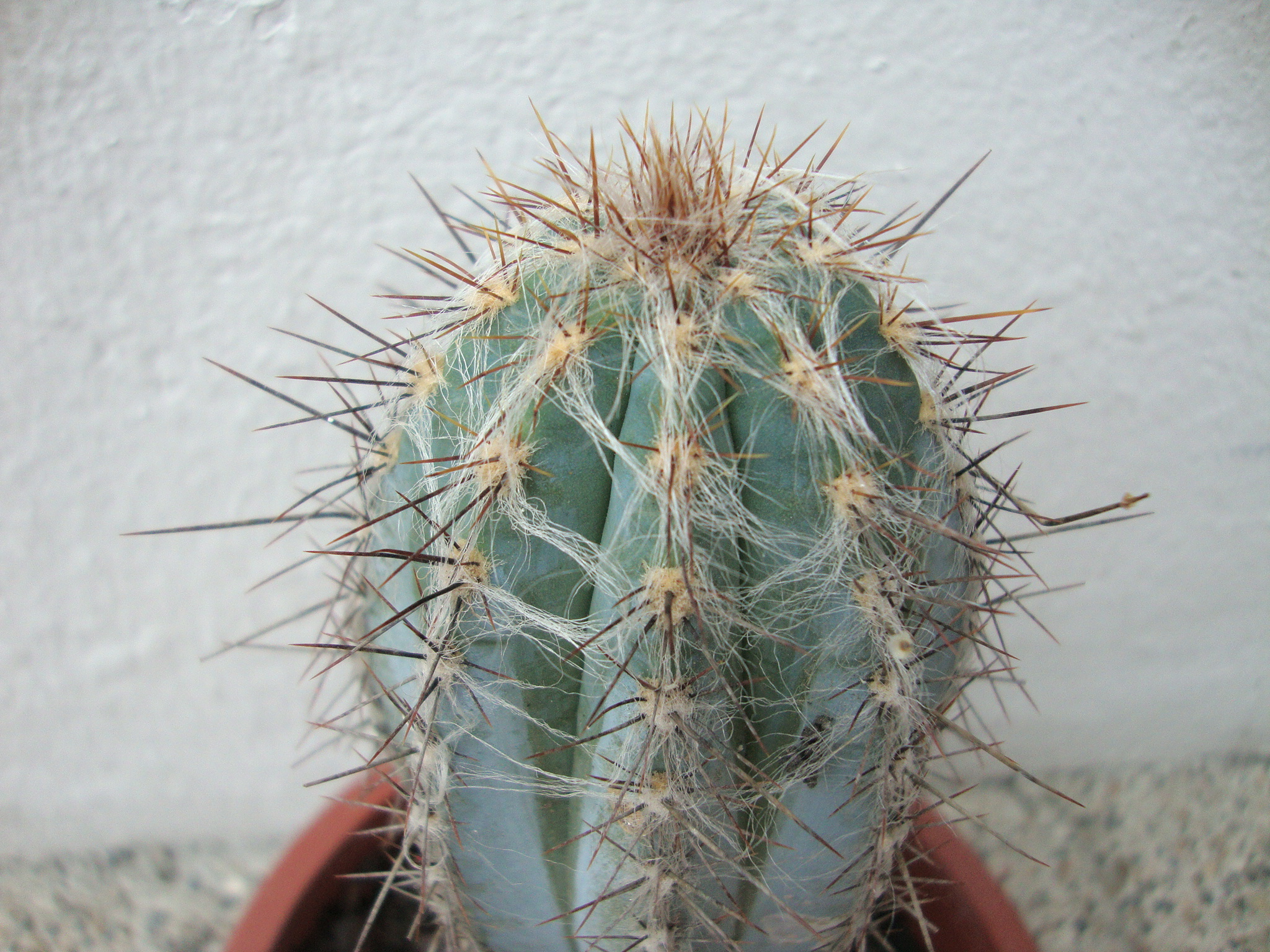

Scientific classification
- Kingdom: Plantae
- Clade: Tracheophytes
- Clade: Angiosperms
- Clade: Eudicots
- Order: Caryophyllales
- Family: Cactaceae
- Subfamily: Cactoideae
- Genus: Pilosocereus
- Species: P. colombianus

Binomial name
- Pilosocereus colombianus (Rose) Byles & G.D. Rowley

Synonyms
- Cephalocereus colombianus Rose; Cephalocereus tweedyanus Britton & Rose; Cereus colombianus (Rose) Vaupel; Cereus tweedyanus (Britton & Rose) Werderm.; Pilocereus tweedyanus (Britton & Rose) Backeb.; Pilosocereus colombianus subsp. tuberculosus (Rauh & Backeb.) Lodé; Pilosocereus colombianus subsp. tweedyanus (Britton & Rose) Lodé; Pilosocereus gironensis Rauh & Backeb. ex Byles & G.D.Rowley; Pilosocereus lanuginosus subsp. colombianus (Rose) Guiggi; Pilosocereus tuberculosus Rauh & Backeb.; Pilosocereus tweedyanus (Britton & Rose) Byles & G.D.Rowley

= Pilosocereus colombianus =

Species of cactus

Pilosocereus colombianus is a species of cactus (family Cactaceae) native to Colombia, Ecuador and Peru. It was first described in 1909.

== Description ==
Pilosocereus colombianus has bluish to grayish green stems. Its branches are ascending, sometimes strictly upright, and have 6–12 ribs. The areoles have rigid spines up to 3 cm (1.2 in) long that are dark red or brown when fresh. The areoles have silky hairs up to 3 cm (1.2 in) long, in dense tufts on flowering areoles, less dense on non-flowering ones. The flowers are 5–7 cm (2.0–2.8 in) long with purplish outer segments (tepals) and white inner segments. The fruit is purple.

== Taxonomy ==
The species was first described by Joseph Nelson Rose in 1909 as Cephalocereus colombianus and transferred to the genus Pilosocereus in 1957. The dark spines and purple fruits are considered to differentiate this species from others in the genus, in particular from P. lanuginosus. It has also been treated as a subspecies of P. lanuginosus, P. lanuginosus subsp. colombianus.

== Distribution ==
Pilosocereus colombianus is found in Valle del Cauca Department, Colombia, and the provinces of Azuay, El Oro, Guayas, Loja, Manabí, and Santa Elena Provinces of Ecuador. It is also found in Peru.
