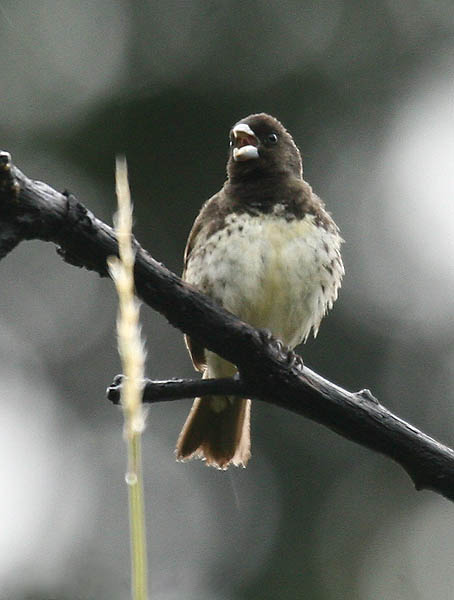
- Male in Ecuador

Conservation status
- Least Concern (IUCN 3.1)

Scientific classification
- Kingdom: Animalia
- Phylum: Chordata
- Class: Aves
- Order: Passeriformes
- Family: Thraupidae
- Genus: Sporophila
- Species: S. nigricollis

Binomial name
- Sporophila nigricollis (Vieillot, 1823)

= Yellow-bellied seedeater =

Species of bird

The yellow-bellied seedeater (Sporophila nigricollis) is a species of bird in the family Thraupidae, the tanagers and allies. It is found in Costa Rica, Panama, on Trinidad, in the Lesser Antilles, and in every South American country except Chile and Uruguay. However, it has been found in Argentina only as a vagrant and reports from Paraguay are unconfirmed.

== Taxonomy and systematics ==
The yellow-bellied seedeater has a complicated taxonomic history. It was formally described in 1823 with the binomial Pyrrhula nigricollis. By 1938 it had been reassigned to its present genus Sporophila, which at the time was a member of the family Fringillidae. By 1970 Sporophila had been reassigned to the family Emberizidae. Based on studies published between 1988 and 2011, beginning in 2012 the genus was moved to its present position in the tanager family Thraupidae.

The yellow-bellied seedeater has these three subspecies:

- S. n. nigricollis (Vieillot, 1823)
- S. n. olivacea/vivida (see below) Berlepsch & Taczanowski, 1884)
- S. n. inconspicua Berlepsch & Stolzmann, 1906

As of September 2026 the most recent versions of the IOC and AviList taxonomies use olivacea and the Clements taxonomy and BirdLife International's Handbook of the Birds of the World use vivida.

A single specimen originally named "hooded seedeater" (Sporophila melanops) bounced among full species status and other interpretations, including a relationship with S. nigricollis, until a 2016 publication determined it was either an unusually dark dark-throated seedeater (S. ruficollis) or less probably a hybrid of unknown parentage.

== Description ==
The yellow-bellied seedeater is 8.5 to 10.3 cm (3.3 to 4.1 in) long and weighs 8.5 to 11.2 g (0.30 to 0.40 oz). It has a short thick bill with a rounded culmen. The species is sexually dimorphic. Adult males of the nominate subspecies S. n. nigricollis usually have a black head and nape. Their upperparts are dull olive with some faint but darker streaks on the back. Their wings are mostly brownish with wide olive edges on the coverts and tertials. Their tail is also brownish with wide olive edges on the feathers. Their throat is black with a sharp demarcation from the pale yellowish underparts; the latter often have dark blurry spots on the flanks. Some individuals have gray instead of olive upperparts and feather edges and whitish underparts. Adult females have a warm buffy brown head, nape, upperparts, wings, and tail. Their throat, breast, and flanks are warm buffy brown, their belly and vent paler buff, and their crissum a darker buff. Juveniles resemble adult females with a warmer cinnamon wash on the underparts. Males of subspecies S. n. olivacea/vivida have greener upperparts and brighter yellow underparts than the nominate. S. n. inconspicua is black only on the front of its head and on its throat. Both sexes of all subspecies have a dark brown iris and blackish legs. Males have a blue-gray bill and females a blackish one.

== Distribution and habitat ==
The nominate subspecies of the yellow-bellied seedeater is the most northerly of the three. It has by far the largest range with two major and several smaller disjunct populations. It is found in Costa Rica spottily in the central highlands and on the Pacific slope in southern San José and Puntarenas provinces. From there its range continues on the Pacific slope of Panama to Colón Province and from there on the Pacific and Caribbean slopes to Colombia. It is found in all three Colombian Andes ranges, in the northeast, and from Caquetá Department east and northeast to Venezuela. From the Colombian Andes it continues south on the eastern Andean slope of Ecuador almost to Peru. In Venezuela it is found on the Colombian border in western Zulia, on both slopes of the Andes, in the Venezuelan Coastal Range, and from southern Apure east into northwestern Amazonas, Bolívar except its center and far east, eastern Anzoátegui, and western Delta Amacuro states. From Colombia and Venezuela the subspecies' range continues into Brazil in extreme northwestern Amazonas and from eastern Venezuela east across the Guianas and northern Brazil's Roraima and extreme northern Pará. It has another large range that extends in Brazil east of a line that approximately tracks from south of the Amazon's mouth in northeastern Pará south to southeastern Pará and far western Tocantins, then west across Mato Grosso and Rondônia into extreme eastern Bolivia. Its southern limit extends from Argentina across Santa Catarina. Though some maps show a presence in far northeastern Argentina's Misiones Province and eastern Paraguay, the South American Classification Committee describes it as a vagrant in the former country and unconfirmed in the latter. In addition to its mainland ranges, the subspecies also is found on Trinidad and the Lesser Antillean islands of Grenada and Carriacou.

Subspecies S. n. olivacea/vivida is found from Nariño Department in far southwestern Colombia south through western Ecuador very slightly into northwestern Peru's Tumbes Department. S. n. inconspicua is found on the eastern slope of the Peruvian Andes for the length of the country and locally on the western slope as far south as Cajamarca Department.

The yellow-bellied seedeater is primarily a bird of grassy landscapes. In addition to open grasslands and clearings in forest these include fallow agricultural land, weedy old pastures, and sometimes the edges of woodlands. in elevation it is found up to 2,200 m (7,200 ft) in Colombia, locally to 2,400 m (7,900 ft) in Ecuador, between 600 and 2,600 m (2,000 and 8,500 ft) in Peru, and in Venezuela to 2,500 m (8,200 ft) north of the Orinoco River and to 1,400 m (4,600 ft) south of it.

== Behavior ==
=== Movement ===
The yellow-bellied seedeater is a year-round resident but roams in search of feeding areas.

=== Feeding ===
The yellow-bellied seedeater feeds almost entirely on grass seeds. It plucks them while sitting on the seed head or by bending the stalk to the ground. In the breeding season it usually forages in pairs but sometimes during it and often in winter forms flocks that can exceed 20 individuals.

=== Breeding ===
The yellow-bellied seedeater's breeding seasons are mostly unknown. It does span between July and September in Panama. In Colombia breeding has been noted at various sites, but not nationwide, in all months. The species is believed to be monogamous. Its nest is a cup woven from grass and other plant fibers with twigs and spider web. It is typically in shrub or tree within about 1 m (3 ft) of the ground. The clutch is usually two eggs though three are known; they are pale greenish buff with brown spots. The incubation period, time to fledging, and details of parental care are not known.

=== Vocalization ===
One description of the yellow-bellied seedeater's song is "a short, musical series of slurred whistles, tsu tsu tsu chew-see'see-sa-héet or [a similar] variation, last note typically higher and accented". Another is "a variable but musical and short phrase...usually ending with two buzzier notes, e.g. tsee-tsee-tsee-bseeooo, bzee-bzee". Its calls "include dry chip notes".

== Status ==
The IUCN has assessed the yellow-bellied seedeater as being of Least Concern. It has an extremely large range and an estimated population of at least five million mature individuals. Its population trend is not known. Though no immediate threats have been identified, it is noted as being significant in the pet trade. A study in Brazil estimated that 16,800 yellow-bellied seedeaters are illegally caught and sold as pets annually. The species is considered "uncommon" in Costa Rica, "usually very common" in Colombia, "fairly common" in Ecuador and Peru, "usually...fairly common" in Venezuela, and "common to frequent" in Brazil.
