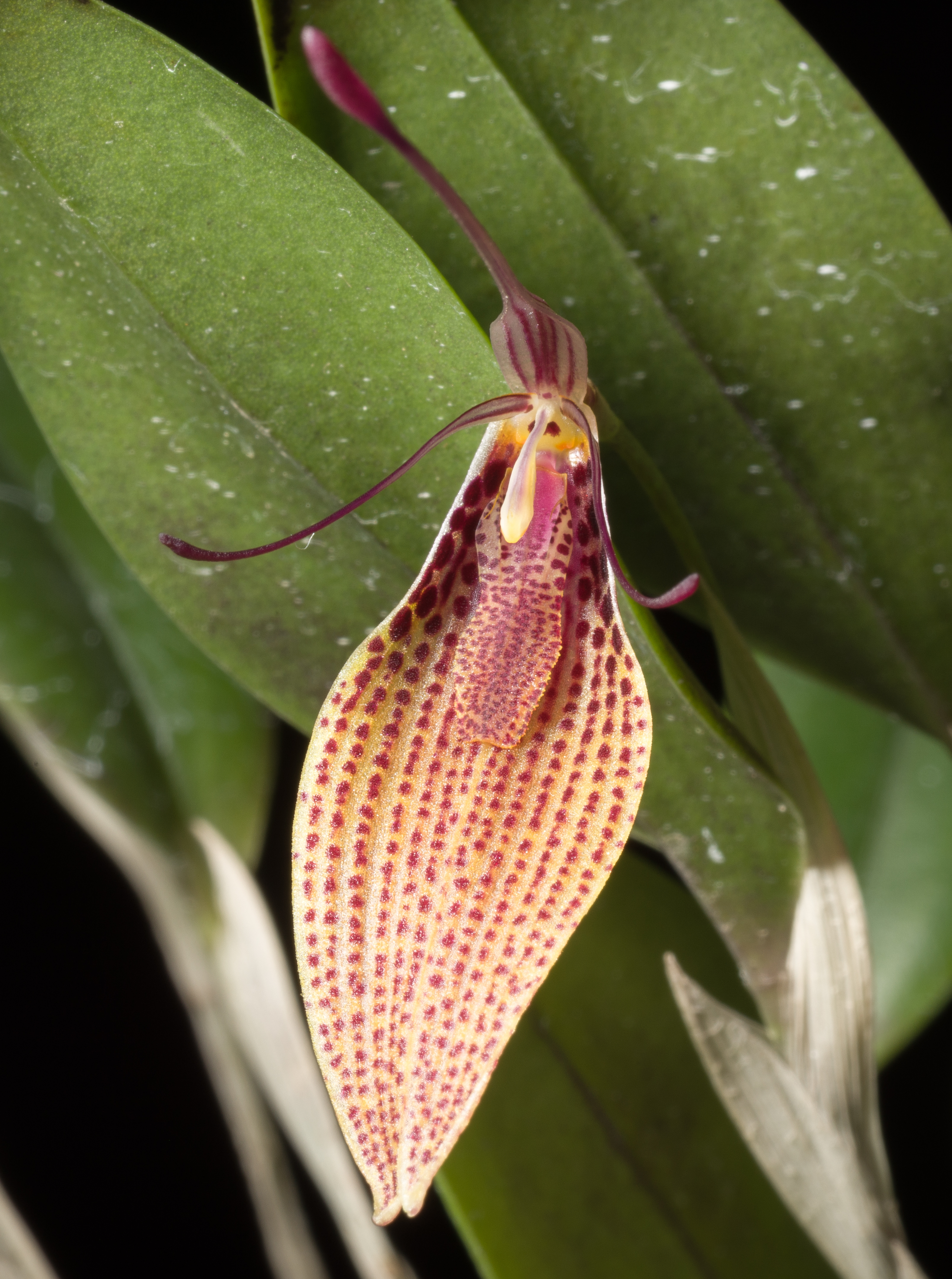

Conservation status
- CITES Appendix II

Scientific classification
- Kingdom: Plantae
- Clade: Tracheophytes
- Clade: Angiosperms
- Clade: Monocots
- Order: Asparagales
- Family: Orchidaceae
- Subfamily: Epidendroideae
- Genus: Restrepia
- Species: R. escobariana

Binomial name
- Restrepia escobariana Luer

= Restrepia escobariana =

Species of flowering plant

Restrepia escobariana is a species of flowering plant in the family Orchidaceae. It is an epiphyte.

Restrepia escobariana is native to the wet tropical biome of Colombia's Risaralda Department.

== Taxonomy ==
Restrepia escobariana was described by Carlyle A. Luer in 1996.

The holotype was collected above a forest in Pueblo Rico, Risaralda, Colombia. A type specimen flowered in cultivation.

== Conservation ==
Restrepia escobariana is listed in Appendix II of CITES. There are no quotas or suspensions in place for the species.
