= Jhon Fredy Serna Gallego =

Colombian hitman and gang leader

Jhon Fredy Serna Gallego (born 1981) is a self-confessed Colombian hitman and gang leader. According to investigations by the judicial authorities and from his own testimony, he selectively murdered between 34 and 39 people, however, it is believed that he killed many others.

Known as Pacho, Serna Gallego committed all his known murders in Chinchiná, Caldas, although there are records that he committed others in Pereira, Risaralda, among other cities and municipalities.

== Crimes ==
Serna Gallego was the leader of a criminal gang called 'Los Sandalios', dedicated to selectively hiring, extorting and trafficking drugs and weapons. During his criminal career, he committed various murders in multiple departments and municipalities, including Chinchiná, Marsella, Pereira, Cartago, Jamundí, Risaralda and others. According to investigations from authorities, Jhon began his criminal activities approximately in 2001, the year in which more than thirty homicides were registered in Chinchiná and the Risaralda Department.

Serna Gallego confessed to having murdered more than thirty people, with the following list showcasing his known victims.

- Rubén Darío Acevedo Vásquez, alias Higuita.
- José Albeiro Valencia
- Carlos Albeiro Gil Osorio, alias el Abejorro.
- Carlos Andrés Vasco Muñoz, alias Guasquiao.
- Jorge Jimmy Gil Guzmán, alias Abejorro hijo.
- Diego Alejandro Henao Ospina
- Jaime Ospina Jiménez.
- Ángela Patricia Alarcón Ruiz.
- Carlos Alberto Vásquez Orozco, alias Memín.
- Rubén Darío García Zapata, alias Chatarra.
- José Ricardo Betancur Martínez, alias el Cabezón.
- Carlos Mario López Henao, alias Ratón.
- Daniel Valencia Ramírez, alias Mocoso.
- Miguel Ángel Hoyos Toro.
- Daniel Stiven Osorio Alzate.
- Arnubio, alias Carecaballo.
- Alias Hilo.
- César Augusto Valencia Hoyos.
- Diego León Gallego Gómez, alias Diego el Mocho.
- Rigoberto Restrepo Zapata, alias Pintado.
- Carlos Ernesto Palacio Álvarez.
- Carlos Alberto Orozco Villada.
- Wilson Jaramillo Castaño, alias Salchichón.
- Octavio Rondón Quiceno, alias Límpido.
- Guillermo Antonio Valencia Montoya, alias Toño.
- Jhon Fredy Bermúdez Torres, alias Freddy Krueger.
- Jorge Mario Marín López, alias J.
- Julián David Palomino Grisales.
- Duván Darío Valencia Hoyos.
- Nicolás Giraldo Giraldo, alias Chatarrero.
- Rubén Darío Pimienta Castaño, alias Cachirulo.
- Germán Andrés Pimienta Castaño, alias Cachetes.
- Geovany García Leyva, alias Millones.
- Francy Vargas Piñeros, alias la Tuerta.

Apart from these murders, there are records of other murders committed in Risaralda in 2005, with Serna Gallego being suspected of involvement in 10 of them. He was captured in 2011 in Villa Colombia, and transferred to the Palo Gordo de Girón Prison in Santander. His gang was disintegrated by police in 2014, after an extensive operation.

Serna Gallego was charged with various crimes, including aggravated homicide, extortion, carrying and trafficking firearms, and conspiracy to commit a crime; in addition, he had 24 arrest warrants for him.

In a report issued by the specialized press in October 2015, it was stated that eight members of this fearsome criminal group were released due to expiration of their prison term. This didn't apply to Serna Gallego, who is still behind bars.
