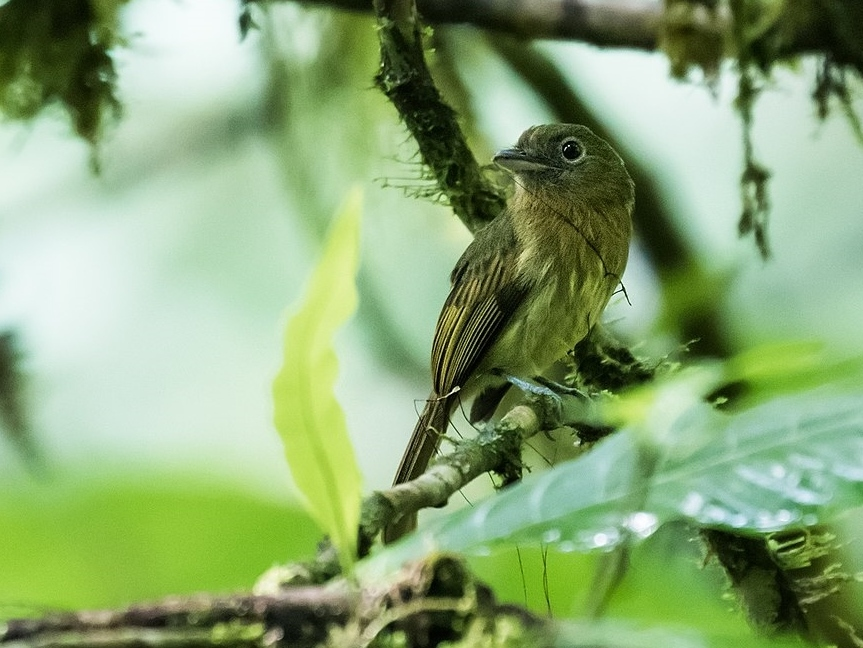
- At Risaralda, Colombia

Conservation status
- Least Concern (IUCN 3.1)

Scientific classification
- Kingdom: Animalia
- Phylum: Chordata
- Class: Aves
- Order: Passeriformes
- Family: Tyrannidae
- Genus: Rhynchocyclus
- Species: R. fulvipectus

Binomial name
- Rhynchocyclus fulvipectus (Sclater, PL, 1860)

= Fulvous-breasted flatbill =

Species of bird

The fulvous-breasted flatbill (Rhynchocyclus fulvipectus) is a species of bird in the family Tyrannidae, the tyrant flycatchers. It is found in Bolivia, Colombia, Ecuador, Peru, and Venezuela.

== Taxonomy and systematics ==
The fulvous-breasted flatbill was originally described in 1860 as Cyclorhynchus fulvipectus. The species is monotypic.

== Description ==
The fulvous-breasted flatbill is about 15 cm (5.9 in) long and weighs 11.4 to 27.5 g (0.40 to 0.97 oz). The sexes have the same plumage. Adults have a dark olive head with a faint grayish eye-ring. Their entire upperparts are dark olive. Their wings are a duskier olive with wide tawny-buff or ochre edges on the wing coverts and flight feathers. Their tail is a brownish olive. Their chin is gray, their lower throat and breast are dull tawny-rufous, and their belly, flanks, and vent are yellow with olive streaks on the flanks. They have a dark iris, a large wide and flat bill with a black maxilla and pale mandible, and gray legs and feet.

== Distribution and habitat ==
The fulvous-breasted flatbill has a disjunct distribution. In Venezuela it is known only from extreme southwestern Táchira with apparently no extension into adjacent Colombia. Other populations are found intermittently along the northern part of Colombia's Central Andes and on the western slope of the Eastern Andes. Another population is along Colombia's Western Andes from Antioquia Department south into northwestern Ecuador as far as Pichincha Province. The last is found from Sucumbíos Province in far northern Ecuador south along the eastern slope of the Andes through Peru and into northwestern Bolivia as far as Cochabamba Department.

The fulvous-breasted flatbill inhabits the interior and edges of humid to wet foothill and montane forests and secondary forest in the foothill and subtropical zones. It often is found near streams. In Venezuela it is found at about 1,800 m (5,900 ft) of elevation. It ranges between 500 and 2,000 m (1,600 and 6,600 ft) in Colombia, between 900 and 1,800 m (3,000 and 5,900 ft) in Ecuador, and between 1,000 and 2,000 m (3,300 and 6,600 ft) in Peru.

== Behavior ==
=== Movement ===
The fulvous-breasted flatbill is a year-round resident.

=== Feeding ===
The fulvous-breasted flatbill feeds on a variety of arthropods. It typically forages singly but often joins mixed-species feeding flocks. It tends to be sluggish, peering around and up from a perch in the understory. It captures prey in the understory to mid-story between about 1 and 4 m (3 and 13 ft) of the ground, using upward sallies to snatch or hover-glean it from leaves and twigs. It only rarely takes prey in mid-air. It typically lands on a different perch after a sally.

=== Breeding ===
The fulvous-breasted flatbill's breeding season has not been defined but includes May in northern Colombia and August in Peru. Its nest is a large pear-shaped mass with a tunnel entrance that slopes up to near the bottom of the nest. It is made from rootlets, plant fibers, and dead leaves. It is suspended from the tip of a twig or a vine, typically over an open space or a small watercourse. The clutch is one to three eggs that are white with small reddish or cinnamon specks. The incubation period is about 24 days and fledging occurs at least 29 days after hatch. The details of parental care are not known.

=== Vocalization ===
The fulvous-breasted flatbill's call is "an infrequent wheezy and upslurred 'zhreeyp' " or "a rising, scratchy zreeee'zi'zi'zip".

== Status ==
The IUCN has assessed the fulvous-breasted flatbill as being of Least Concern. It has a large range; its population size is not known and is believed to be decreasing. No immediate threats have been identified. It is considered rare in Venezuela and uncommon from Colombia to Bolivia. It occurs in at least one protected area in each of Colombia and Ecuador.
