= Apía, Risaralda =

Coordinates: 5°06′N 75°57′W

Apía
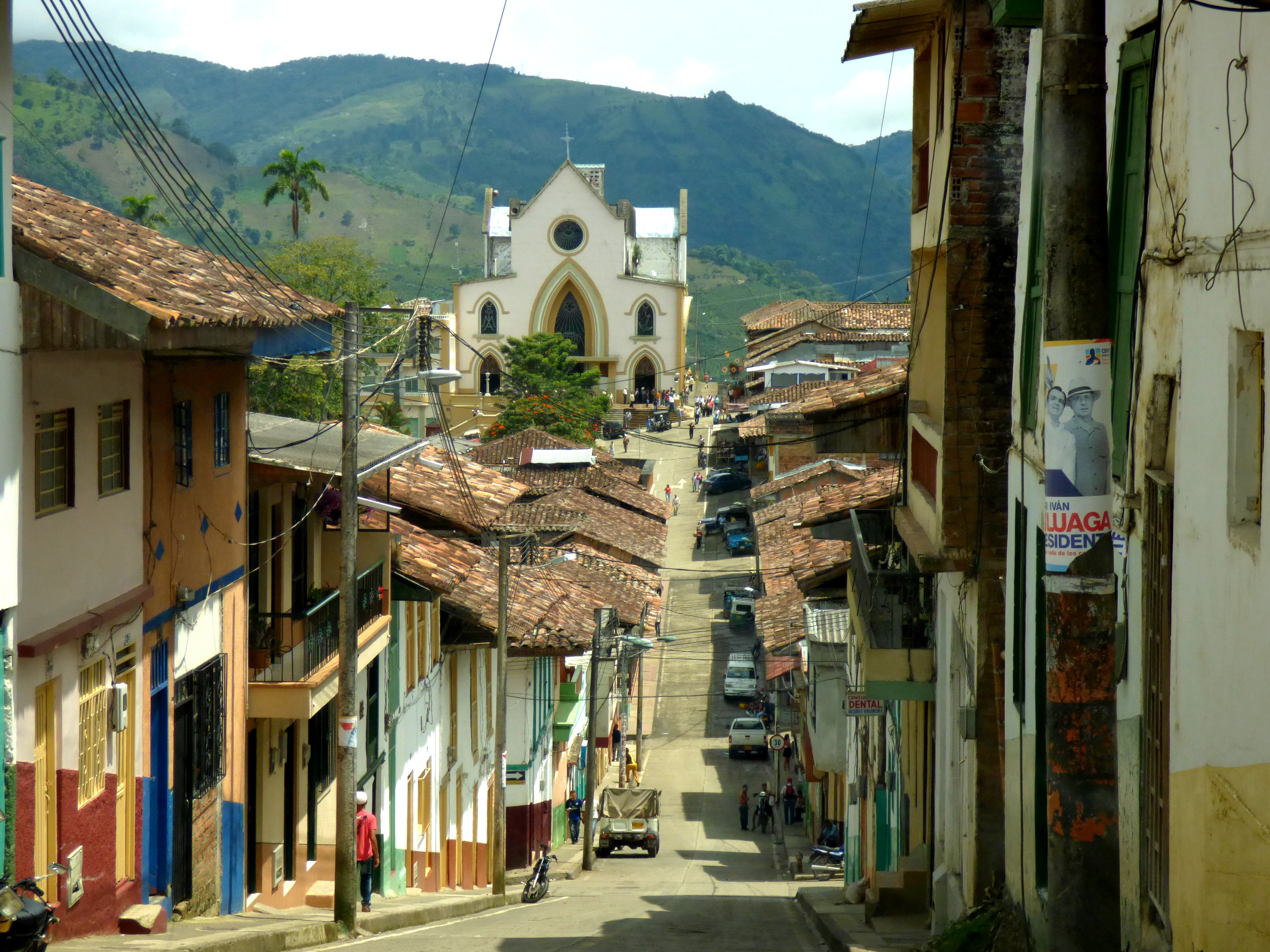
- Streets of Apía

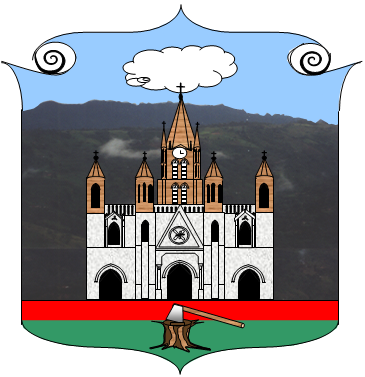
- Flag Coat of arms

- Location of the town and municipality of Apia in Risaralda Department.
- Country: Colombia
- Department: Risaralda
- Foundation: 15 August 1883
- Elevation: 1,630 m (5,350 ft)

Population (2023)
  - Total: 12,613
- Time zone: UTC-5

Apía is a town and municipality in the Department of Risaralda, Colombia. It is located at an elevation of 1,630 metres, about 60 km away from district capital Pereira in the valley of the Apia river. For 2023 it has approximately 12,613 inhabitants. The town has excellent views over Cerro Tatamá, which is part of Tatamá National Natural Park.

== History ==
The area was colonised in 1872 but the town was founded on 15 August 1883 by settlers from Antioquia. Amongst these were José María Marín and his wife María Encarnación de Marín who were the first to build in the area. The settlement was initially called La Villa de las Cáscaras ("Town of the Husks") because the roofs were thatched with cumulú, a native plant.

== Climate ==
Apía has a subtropical highland climate with an average annual temperature of 19 °C.

Climate data for Santuario/Apía, elevation 1,650 m (5,410 ft), (1981–2010)
Month	Jan	Feb	Mar	Apr	May	Jun	Jul	Aug	Sep	Oct	Nov	Dec	Year
Mean daily maximum °C (°F)	23.8 (74.8)	24.1 (75.4)	24.0 (75.2)	23.4 (74.1)	23.4 (74.1)	23.5 (74.3)	23.9 (75.0)	24.3 (75.7)	23.9 (75.0)	23.1 (73.6)	22.9 (73.2)	23.2 (73.8)	23.6 (74.5)
Daily mean °C (°F)	19.1 (66.4)	19.4 (66.9)	19.4 (66.9)	19.3 (66.7)	19.2 (66.6)	19.3 (66.7)	19.6 (67.3)	19.7 (67.5)	19.2 (66.6)	18.7 (65.7)	18.7 (65.7)	18.9 (66.0)	19.2 (66.6)
Mean daily minimum °C (°F)	16.1 (61.0)	16.2 (61.2)	16.3 (61.3)	16.3 (61.3)	16.4 (61.5)	16.3 (61.3)	16.2 (61.2)	16.3 (61.3)	16.1 (61.0)	15.9 (60.6)	15.9 (60.6)	16.1 (61.0)	16.2 (61.2)
Average precipitation mm (inches)	111.2 (4.38)	116.7 (4.59)	144.9 (5.70)	207.3 (8.16)	214.5 (8.44)	176.2 (6.94)	148.7 (5.85)	136.9 (5.39)	169.1 (6.66)	218.8 (8.61)	217.2 (8.55)	139.5 (5.49)	2,001.1 (78.78)
Average precipitation days	14	13	17	20	20	17	16	14	17	21	20	16	199
Average relative humidity (%)	84	83	84	85	86	84	81	79	82	85	86	86	84
Mean monthly sunshine hours	155.0	138.3	130.2	111.0	117.8	126.0	173.6	173.6	138.0	108.5	108.0	127.1	1,607.1
Mean daily sunshine hours	5.0	4.9	4.2	3.7	3.8	4.2	5.6	5.6	4.6	3.5	3.6	4.1	4.4
Source: Instituto de Hidrologia Meteorologia y Estudios Ambientales

== Town plan ==
The urban area comprises the boroughs of Jaime Rendón, Bermeja, Centenario, Quince de Agosto, El Clavel, Santa Inés, Villa de las Cáscaras, Acozma I, Motoristas, San Juan, San Vicente, Asovice, Villaserrana and Antonio Nariño.

The rural area is made up of 45 corregimientos: Dos Quebradas, Guarne, San Andrés, San Agustín, La floresta, La Máquina, La sombra, El Manzano, Matecaña, Las Delicias, Bajo Manzanillo, Monte verde, El Jazmín, Alto Manzanillo, Miravalle, San Carlos, El Guanábano, El Quindío, La Equis, El Bosque, El Vergel, El Encanto, San Rafael, Alta Campana, Las Cumbres, Buena Vista, Baja Campana, La María, Valladolid, El Carmelo, El Jardín, Pavero, La Estrella, Alta Estrella, Jordania, La Línea, La Nubia, El Diamante, Agua Bonita, Candelaria, La Farallona, La Garrucha, Las Cabañas, Agualinda y Campo Alegre.

== Economy ==
The economy's mainstay is agriculture, especially coffee. It is located in one of the world's prime coffee growing areas and is the home of the organic coffee movement. The organic coffee movement is led by Francisco Jose "Pacho" Herrera Gallego

== Culture ==
The town is well known for its cultural contributions at a national level, especially its music bands and musicians such as Rubo Marín Pulgarín and Carlos Fernando López Naranjo. In the months of April, May and June of this year (2019), again three poets of Apía, triumphed in international contests of sonnet in Spanish publishers: Gersaín Antonio Restrepo Agudelo, Juan Hely Morales Bedoya and Francisco Javier López Naranjo.
