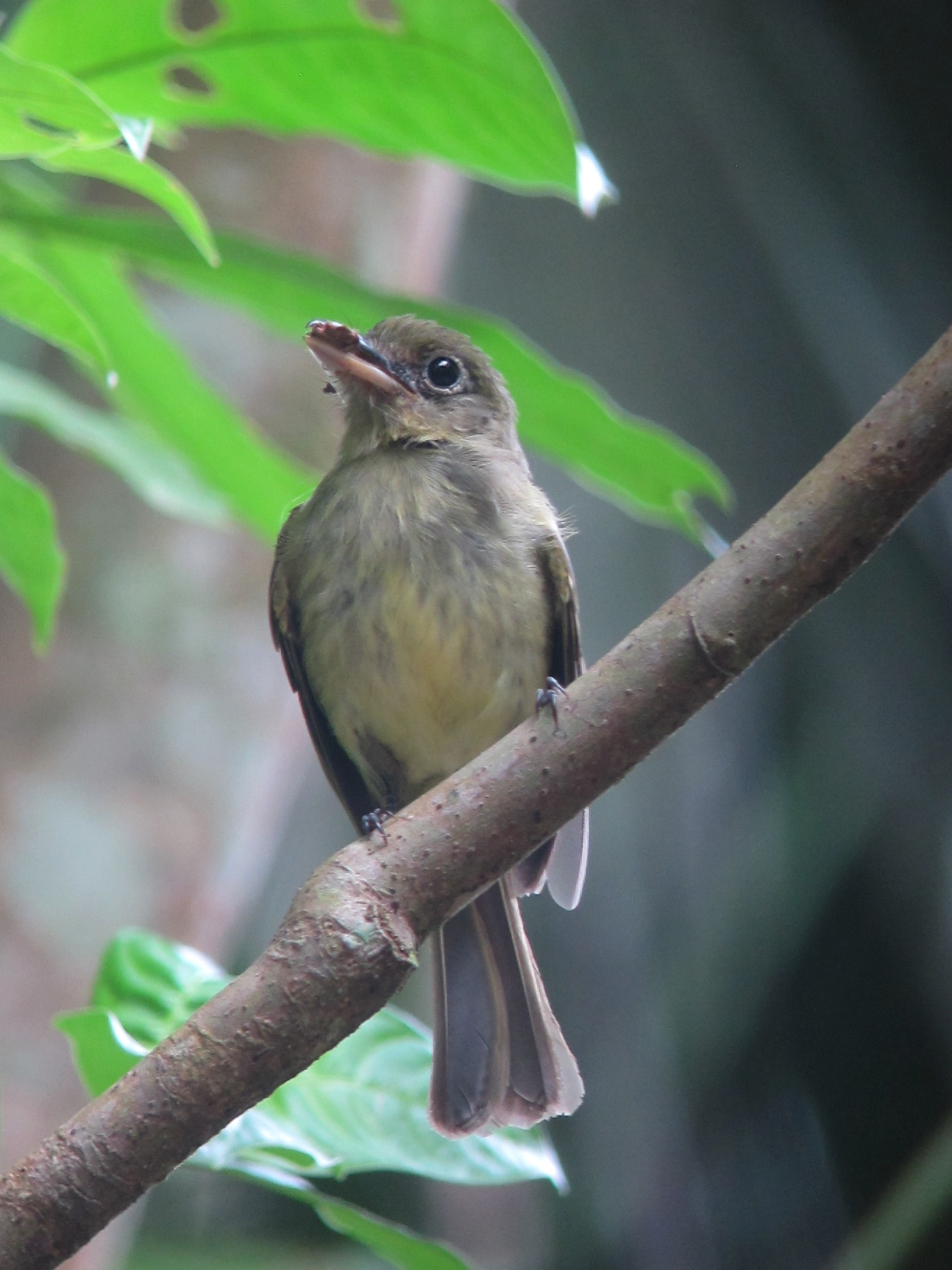

Conservation status
- Least Concern (IUCN 3.1)

Scientific classification
- Kingdom: Animalia
- Phylum: Chordata
- Class: Aves
- Order: Passeriformes
- Family: Tyrannidae
- Genus: Rhynchocyclus
- Species: R. olivaceus

Binomial name
- Rhynchocyclus olivaceus (Temminck, 1820)

= Eastern olivaceous flatbill =

Species of bird

The eastern olivaceous flatbill (Rhynchocyclus olivaceus) is a species of bird in the family Tyrannidae, the tyrant flycatchers. It is found in Brazil, French Guiana, Guyana, Suriname, and Venezuela.

== Taxonomy and systematics ==
The eastern olivaceous flatbill was formally described and illustrated in 1820 by the Dutch zoologist Coenraad Jacob Temminck under the binomial name Platyrhynchos olivaceus. Temminck specified the type locality as Brazil but this was restricted to Rio de Janeiro by Olivério Pinto in 1944. The eastern olivaceous flatbill is now one of five flatbills placed in the genus Rhynchocyclus that was introduced in 1836 by Jean Cabanis.

Three subspecies are recognised:

- R. o. guianensis McConnell, 1911 – south Venezuela, the Guianas and north Amazonian Brazil
- R. o. sordidus Todd, 1952 – southeast Amazonian Brazil
- R. o. olivaceus (Temminck, 1820) – central north, east Brazil

The many subspecies of what is now the western olivaceous flatbill (R. aequinoctialis) were previously treated as additional subspecies; the larger species was called the olivaceous flatbill. Following a paper published in 2016 several taxonomic authorities split the olivaceous flatbill into western and eastern species though some took until 2023 to do so. By the principle of priority the eastern retained the binomial Rhynchocyclus olivaceous. However, as of early 2025 the North and South American Classification Committees of the American Ornithological Society retain the unsplit olivaceous flatbill, though based on a 2021 publication the South American committee is seeking a proposal to split it into as many as four species.

== Description ==
The eastern olivaceous flatbill is about 15 cm (5.9 in) long and weighs 18 to 24.8 g (0.63 to 0.87 oz). The sexes have the same plumage. Adults of the nominate subspecies have a dark olive head with a white eye-ring. Their entire upperparts are dark olive. Their wings are dusky with ochre to buff edges on the wing coverts and secondaries that form two dull wing bars. Their tertials have yellow edges. Their tail is a dusky with paler outer edges on the feathers. Their throat is pale gray to pale yellow, their breast grayish olive, and their belly, flanks, and vent are pale yellow. The breast and flanks have olive streaks. Juveniles have duller olive upperparts, paler yellow underparts, and more ochraceous olive uppertail coverts than adults. The other two subspecies have essentially the same plumage though R. o. guianensis has a fainter eye-ring than the nominate. All subspecies have a dark brown iris, a wide flat bill with a black maxilla and a pale horn mandible, and blue-gray to gray legs and feet.

== Distribution and habitat ==
The eastern olivaceous flatbill has a disjunct distribution. Subspecies R. o. guianensis is found from Bolívar and eastern Amazonas states in Venezuela east through the Guianas and northern Brazil north of the Amazon from the Negro River east to the Atlantic. Subspecies R. o. sordidus is found across Brazil south of the Amazon from the Tapajós River east to the Tocantins River and the Atlantic in northern Maranhão state. The nominate subspecies is found separately in northeastern and eastern Brazil between Pernambuco and Rio de Janeiro states. The species primarily inhabits humid terra firme forest and secondary woodland, and also várzea forest. In elevation it ranges from sea level to 500 m (1,600 ft).

== Behavior ==
=== Movement ===
The eastern olivaceous flatbill is believed to be a year-round resident.

=== Feeding ===
The eastern olivaceous flatbill feeds on arthropods, though details are lacking. It typically forages singly and often joins mixed-species feeding flocks. It tends to be sluggish, peering slowly around and up from a perch in the understory. It captures prey in the understory to mid-story, using outward or upward sallies to snatch or hover-glean it from leaves and twigs. It only rarely takes prey in mid-air. It typically lands on a different perch after a sally.

=== Breeding ===
The eastern olivaceous flatbill's breeding season has not been fully defined. The two Amazon Basin subspecies breed at least during June and July. The nominate subspecies' season includes October and November. Its nest is a bulky, ragged, pear-shaped mass with a tunnel entrance that slopes up to near the bottom of the nest. It is made from fungal rhizomorphs, plant fibers, and dead leaves; two were suspended 1.6 and 3 m (5 and 10 ft) above the ground. The clutch is two white eggs. In one nest fledging occurred about 21 days after hatch. The incubation period, typical time to fledging, and details of parental care are not known.

=== Vocalization ===
Researchers have identified two eastern olivaceous flatbill vocalizations. Its song is a "series of some 10 notes, starting with 1‒2 long notes and followed by much shorter notes". It may either ascend or descend and may be as short as just the initial notes with two shorter ones. The species "stutter" is a "rough chatter or descending stuttered series of some 6‒10 notes (or more)" whose tone can be from pure to buzzy.

== Status ==
The IUCN has assessed the eastern olivaceous flatbill as being of Least Concern. It has a large range; its population size is not known and is believed to be stable. No immediate threats have been identified. It is considered uncommon in Venezuela. It occurs in several protected areas in Brazil, "[t]olerates converted habitats to some extent, and [is] not likely to be at any risk in immediate future".
