= La Celia =

Coordinates: 5°00′07″N 76°00′14″W

- Municipality and town
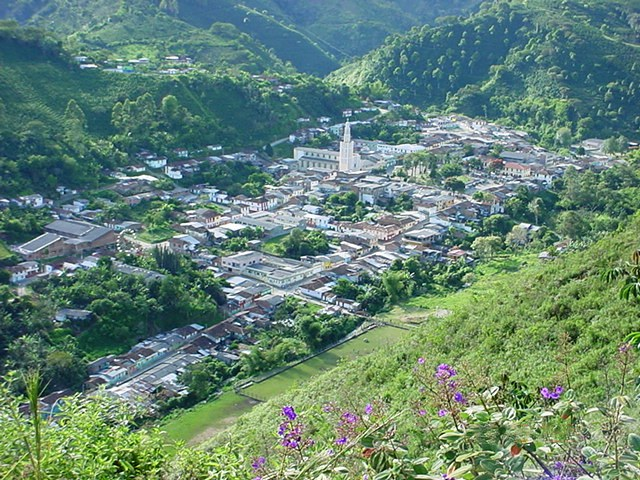
- Panorama of La Celia

- Flag Coat of arms
- Nickname: "Paraíso entre montañas"
- Motto: "Progreso y Paz"
- Location of the municipality and town of La Celia in the Risaralda Department of Colombia.
- Country: Colombia
- Department: Risaralda Department

Government
  - Mayor: Carlos Uriel Isaza Gallego (2024-2027)

Area
  - Municipality and town: 102 km^{2} (39 sq mi)
- Elevation: 1,380 m (4,530 ft)

Population (2024)
  - Municipality and town: 9,660
  - Urban: 3,600
- Time zone: UTC-5 (Colombia Standard Time)

La Celia ((Spanish pronunciation: [la ˈselja]) elevation 1480m) is a town and municipality in the Department of Risaralda, Colombia. About 67 km away from the capital Pereira. It belongs to the central-western region of the country and the Western Slope of Risaralda, noted for its agricultural and livestock production.

== History ==
In 1893 Manuel Marín and Martín Ortiz began the colonizing process and thanks to the efforts of their people, in 1915 the hamlet of Barcelona became what we know today as La Celia. A town that for a long time was a district of the Municipality of Santuario and that was finally declared a Municipality on November 30, 1959.

== Climate ==
La Celia has a subtropical highland climate with an average annual temperature of 18 °C.
