= Clive Joy-Morancho =

British aviation tycoon

- Born: Clive Douglas Christopher Joy-Morancho; September 1958 (age 67–68); Northern Rhodesia (now Zimbabwe)
- Occupations: tycoon, driver
- Spouse: Nichola Ann Joy (2006-2011)
- Children: 3
- Parents: David Joy (father); Montserrat Morancho Saumench (mother)
- Relatives: Jennifer Marina Joy-Morancho (sister); Anya Taylor-Joy (niece)

Clive Joy-Morancho (born 1958 in Zimbabwe) is a British formed aviation tycoon and luxury car collector, resident in Marsella. He was also a competition driver.
