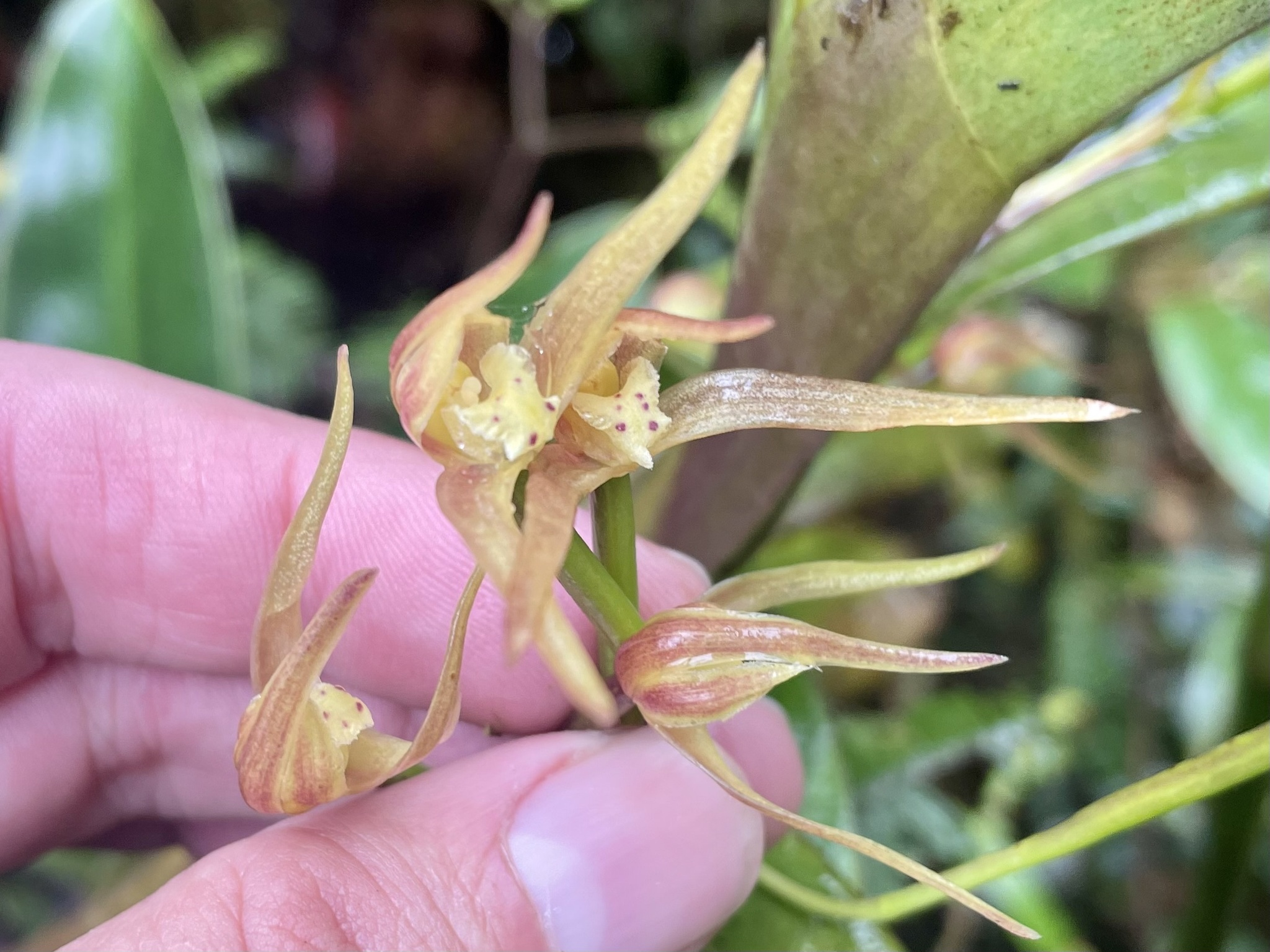

Scientific classification
- Kingdom: Plantae
- Clade: Tracheophytes
- Clade: Angiosperms
- Clade: Monocots
- Order: Asparagales
- Family: Orchidaceae
- Subfamily: Epidendroideae
- Genus: Maxillaria
- Species: M. montezumae

Binomial name
- Maxillaria montezumae (Arévalo & Christenson) Molinari, 2015

Synonyms
- Ornithidium montezumae Arévalo & Christenson 2013

= Maxillaria montezumae =

Species of orchid

Maxillaria montezumae, the Montezuma maxillaria, is a species of orchid native to Colombia. It is named after the Montezuma area in the Tatamá National Natural Park in the departments of Chocó and Risaralda. It is a pseudobulbous epiphyte and grows on roadside banks in páramo at elevations of 1,600 to 2,500 m (5,200 to 8,200 ft).
