= Tatamá National Natural Park =

National park in Colombia

- PNN Tatamá
- IUCN category II (national park)
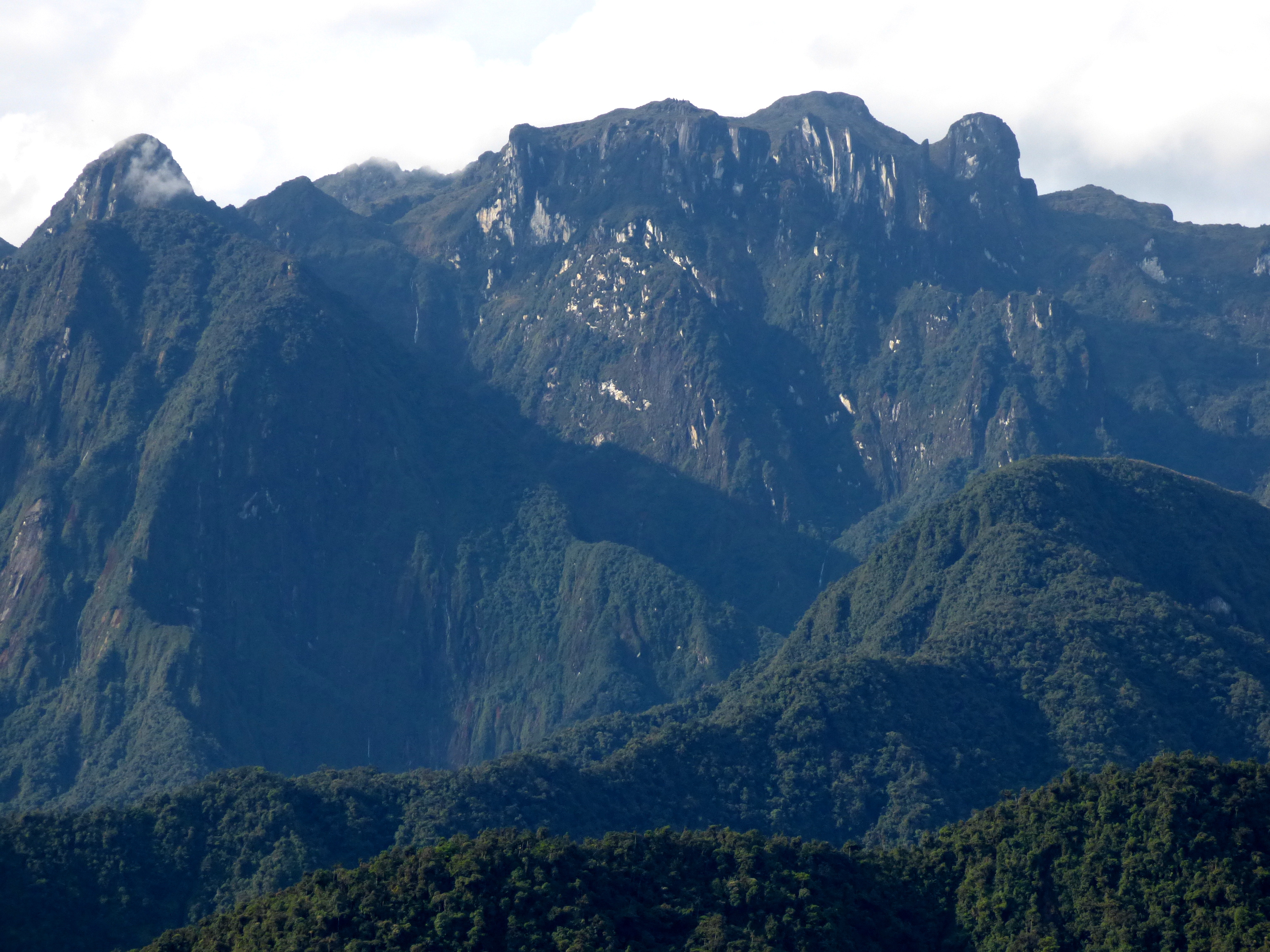
- The Cerro Tatamá in the Park

- Location within Colombia
- Location: Colombia
- Nearest city: Pueblo Rico
- Coordinates: 5.10°N 76.15°W
- Area: 51,900 ha (200 sq mi)
- Designation: National Natural Park
- Established: 1987
- Administrator: SINAP
- Website: Official website

Tatamá National Natural Park (Spanish: Parque Nacional Natural Tatamá or PNN Tatamá) is a national park in the Cordillera Occidental, Colombia. Established in 1987, the park encompasses 51,900 ha (128,000 acres) of primary west-Andean tropical and subtropical rainforest, temperate cloud forest, and páramo habitat in an area that spans the departments of Risaralda, Chocó and Valle del Cauca, within the Chocó bioregion.

The protected area is of high scientific interest because of its rich biodiversity and the unique state of conservation of its ecosystems. The park is home to tributaries of the San Juan and Cauca Rivers and, in its highest elevation area, to Páramo Tatamá, which along Frontino and El Duende, represents one of the only three páramos in Colombia that have not been altered by humans. Cerro Tatamá, the highest peak in the Cordillera Occidental, reaching an elevation of 4,100 m (13,500 ft), lies within the park.

== Flora and fauna ==
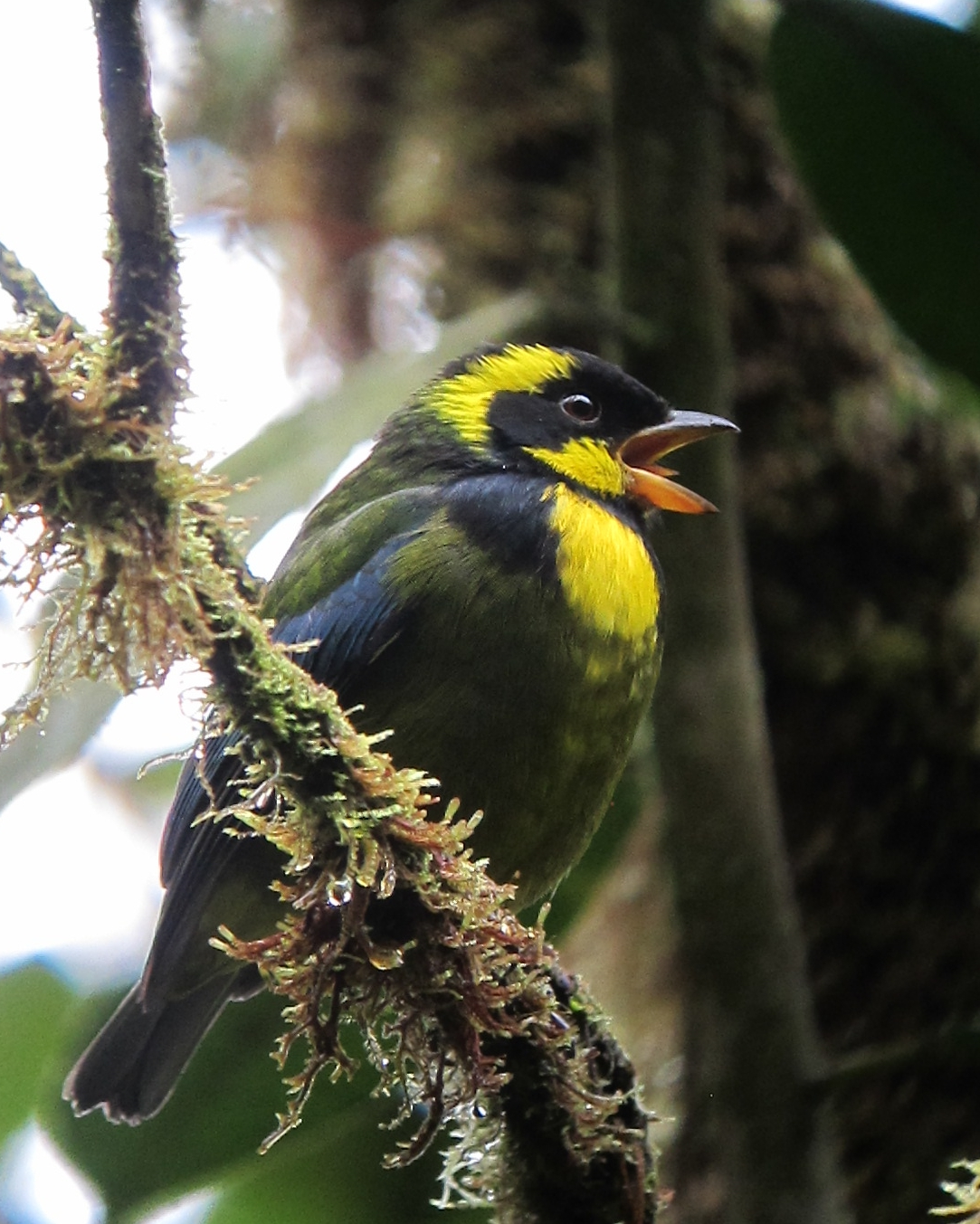
Gold-ringed Tanager (Bangsia aureocincta), an endemic bird species found in Tatamá.

Over 560 species of orchids can be found in the park, many of which are endemic to the area (such as the Montezuma maxillaria). The protected area is also a popular birding destination in Colombia with more than 620 bird species recorded, including 16 endemic to Colombia (of which seven are only found in the western Cordillera):

- Colombian Chachalaca
- Chestnut Wood-Quail
- Dusky Starfrontlet
- Grayish Piculet
- Yellow-eared Parrot
- Parker's Antbird
- Chamí Antpitta
- Tatama Tapaculo
- Munchique Wood-Wren
- Red-bellied Grackle
- Crested Ant-Tanager
- Black-and-Gold Tanager
- Gold-ringed Tanager
- Multicolored Tanager
- Turquoise Dacnis
- Chestnut-bellied Flowerpiercer

== Access ==
The park can only be accessed via Montezuma Road (Spanish: Camino de Montezuma), a dirt road that starts in the town of Pueblo Rico and winds up Cerro Montezuma to a military base at its summit, 2,600 m (8,500 ft). The Montezuma Rainforest Ecolodge property (1,350 m (4,430 ft)), located near the entrance of the park, is the main gateway to the protected area.
