= Chalybea occidentalis =

Conservation status
- Endangered (IUCN 3.1)

Scientific classification
- Kingdom: Plantae
- Clade: Tracheophytes
- Clade: Angiosperms
- Clade: Eudicots
- Clade: Rosids
- Order: Myrtales
- Family: Melastomataceae
- Genus: Chalybea
- Species: C. occidentalis

Binomial name
- Chalybea occidentalis (Lozano & N.Ruiz-R.) M.E.Morales & Penneys

Synonyms
- Huilaea occidentalis Lozano & N.Ruiz-R.

Species of flowering plant

Chalybea occidentalis is a species of plant in the family Melastomataceae. It is endemic to Cauca, and Risaralda in Colombia.
