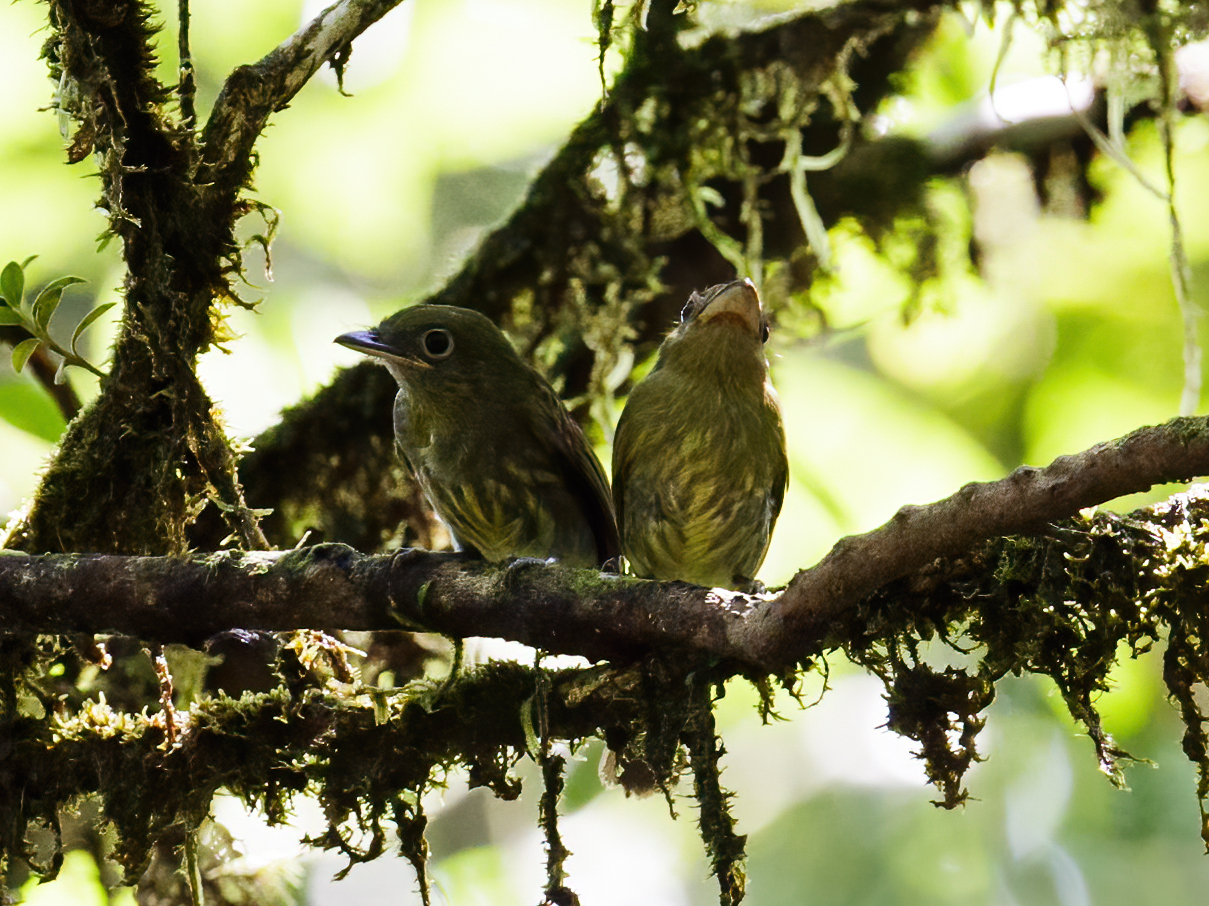

Conservation status
- Least Concern (IUCN 3.1)

Scientific classification
- Kingdom: Animalia
- Phylum: Chordata
- Class: Aves
- Order: Passeriformes
- Family: Tyrannidae
- Genus: Rhynchocyclus
- Species: R. pacificus

Binomial name
- Rhynchocyclus pacificus (Chapman, 1914)

= Pacific flatbill =

Species of bird

The Pacific flatbill (Rhynchocyclus pacificus) is a species of bird in the family Tyrannidae, the tyrant flycatchers. It is found in Colombia and Ecuador.

== Taxonomy and systematics ==
The Pacific flatbill was originally described in 1914 as Craspedoprion pacificus. It had been known to ornithologists but was believed to be conspecific with what is now the western olivaceous flatbill (Rhynchocyclus aequinoctialis). It was later treated by many authors as a subspecies of the eye-ringed flatbill (R. brevirostris) but by the mid-twentieth century was widely accepted as a full species. By the late twentieth century some taxonomists treated the Pacific and eye-ringed flatbills as a superspecies but later study showed that the Pacific flatbill is basal to all other members of Rhynchocyclus.

The Pacific flatbill is monotypic.

== Description ==
The Pacific flatbill is about 15 cm (5.9 in) long and weighs 23.5 to 26.5 g (0.83 to 0.93 oz). The sexes have the same plumage. Adults have a dark olive head with a faint gray eye-ring. Their upperparts are also dark olive. Their wings and tail are dusky brown with wide tawny-buff or ochre edges on the wing coverts. The wings have olive edges on the primaries and secondaries and buff edges on the tertials. Their throat and breast are olive with faint yellow streaks; their belly and flanks are yellow with olive streaks on the flanks. Both sexes have a dark iris, a large wide and flat bill with a black maxilla and pale mandible, and blue-gray legs and feet.

== Distribution and habitat ==
The Pacific flatbill is a bird of the Chocó. It is found from the middle reaches of the Atrato River in Colombia's Córdoba Department south along the west of the country and through western Ecuador as far as northern Los Ríos Province. It inhabits humid lowland and foothill forest and mature secondary woodland. In elevation it ranges from sea level to 1,500 m (4,900 ft) in Colombia and 800 m (2,600 ft) in Ecuador.

== Behavior ==
=== Movement ===
The Pacific flatbill is believed to be a year-round resident.

=== Feeding ===
The Pacific flatbill feeds on arthropods, though details are lacking. It typically forages singly or in pairs and often joins mixed-species feeding flocks. It tends to be sedentary, peering around from a perch low in the understory. It captures prey with upward sallies to snatch or hover-glean it from leaves and twigs. It only rarely takes prey in mid-air. It typically lands on a different perch after a sally.

=== Breeding ===
The Pacific flatbill's breeding season includes March in Colombia. Nothing else is known about the species' breeding biology.

=== Vocalization ===
The Pacific flatbill's song is "a fast descending series of either clear or burry notes, 'tchwee-tee-tee-te-tu-tu-tu' " and its call "a hissing 'schweeeuw' ".

== Status ==
The IUCN has assessed the Pacific flatbill as being of Least Concern. It has a large range; its population size is not known and is believed to be decreasing. No immediate threats have been identified. It is considered overall uncommon to fairly common but uncommon in Colombia. It occurs in a few protected areas.
