= Balboa, Risaralda =

Coordinates: 4°55′0.01″N 75°57′0″W

- Municipality and town
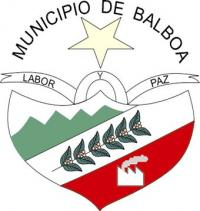
- Flag Coat of arms

- Location of the municipality and town of Balboa, Risaralda in the Risaralda Department of Colombia.
- Country: Colombia
- Department: Risaralda Department
- Elevation: 1,550 m (5,090 ft)

Population (2023)
  - Total: 6,510
- Time zone: UTC-5 (Colombia Standard Time)

Balboa is a town and municipality in the Department of Risaralda, Colombia, with a distance of approximately 53 kilometers from the capital Pereira. In 2023, the town had an estimated population of 6,510.

== History ==
Balboa was founded in 1907 by Antioquian settlers, among whom we can mention Juan Bautista, José Miguel Ceballos, Julián and Pedro Benjumea, Esnoraldo Valencia, Alejandro Murillo, Juan and Waldo Rojas, Leonor and Cesáreo Agudelo, Jacob and Julio Ruiz, Cenon, Juan de Jesús Ospina, Jesús Gallego and Waldo Ochoa.

== Climate ==
Balboa is situated 1550 metres above the sea level. Due to that elevation, the town has a subtropical highland climate with an average annual temperature of 20°C.
