= Chalybea ecuadorensis =

Conservation status
- Vulnerable (IUCN 3.1)

Scientific classification
- Kingdom: Plantae
- Clade: Tracheophytes
- Clade: Angiosperms
- Clade: Eudicots
- Clade: Rosids
- Order: Myrtales
- Family: Melastomataceae
- Genus: Chalybea
- Species: C. ecuadorensis

Binomial name
- Chalybea ecuadorensis (Wurdack) M.E.Morales & Penneys

Synonyms
- Huilaea ecuadorensis Wurdack

Species of flowering plant

Chalybea ecuadorensis is a species of plant in the family Melastomataceae. It is endemic to Ecuador. Its natural habitat is subtropical or tropical moist montane forests.
