= Santuario, Risaralda =

Coordinates: 5°4′20.87″N 75°57′44.45″W

- Municipality and town
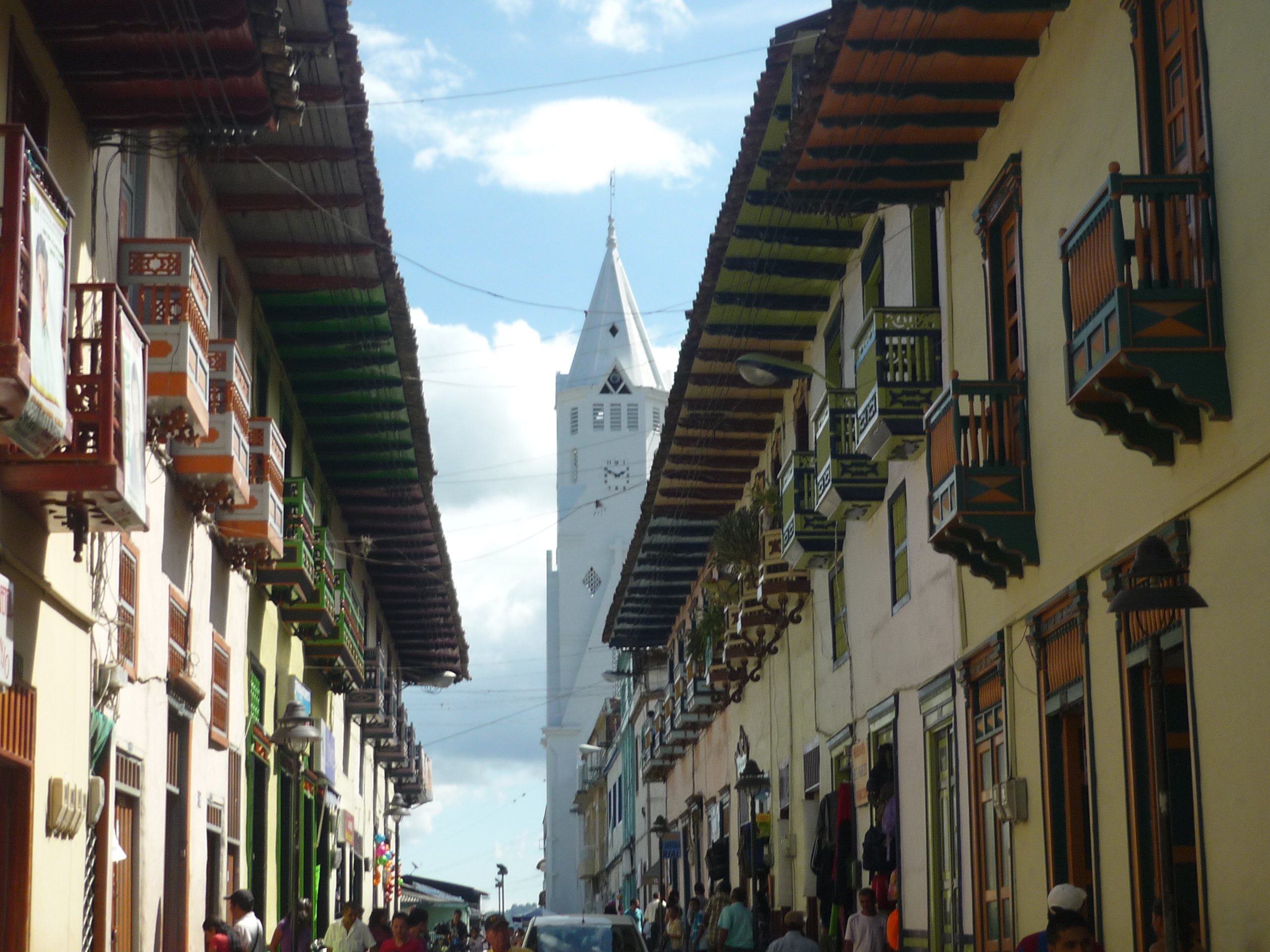
- Street of Santuario

- Flag Coat of arms
- Nickname: Pearl of The Tatamá
- Location of the municipality and town of Santuario, Risaralda in the Risaralda Department of Colombia.
- Country: Colombia
- Department: Risaralda Department

Area
  - Total: 201 km^{2} (78 sq mi)
- Elevation: 1,565 m (5,135 ft)

Population (2023)
  - Total: 12,826
  - Density: 63.8/km^{2} (165/sq mi)
- Time zone: UTC-5 (Colombia Standard Time)

Santuario is a town and municipality in the Department of Risaralda, Colombia. About 64 km away from the capital Pereira. In 2023 the town had an estimated population of 12,826.

== History ==
Founded in 1906, Santuario was born under the administrative tutelage of Anserma and towards part of the state of Cauca. In 1982 it became dependent on the newly created municipality of San Antonio de Apía, a year later the first school was created and in 1894 it ceased to be a hamlet and was declared a township, becoming a parish in 1906. In 1907, it was erected as a Municipality.

== Climate ==
Santuario has a subtropical highland climate with an average annual temperature of 20°C.

Climate data for Santuario (Camelia La), elevation 1,650 m (5,410 ft), (1981–2010)
Month	Jan	Feb	Mar	Apr	May	Jun	Jul	Aug	Sep	Oct	Nov	Dec	Year
Mean daily maximum °C (°F)	23.8 (74.8)	24.1 (75.4)	24.0 (75.2)	23.4 (74.1)	23.4 (74.1)	23.5 (74.3)	23.9 (75.0)	24.3 (75.7)	23.9 (75.0)	23.1 (73.6)	22.9 (73.2)	23.2 (73.8)	23.6 (74.5)
Daily mean °C (°F)	19.1 (66.4)	19.4 (66.9)	19.4 (66.9)	19.3 (66.7)	19.2 (66.6)	19.3 (66.7)	19.6 (67.3)	19.7 (67.5)	19.2 (66.6)	18.7 (65.7)	18.7 (65.7)	18.9 (66.0)	19.2 (66.6)
Mean daily minimum °C (°F)	16.1 (61.0)	16.2 (61.2)	16.3 (61.3)	16.3 (61.3)	16.4 (61.5)	16.3 (61.3)	16.2 (61.2)	16.3 (61.3)	16.1 (61.0)	15.9 (60.6)	15.9 (60.6)	16.1 (61.0)	16.2 (61.2)
Average precipitation mm (inches)	111.2 (4.38)	116.7 (4.59)	144.9 (5.70)	207.3 (8.16)	214.5 (8.44)	176.2 (6.94)	148.7 (5.85)	136.9 (5.39)	169.1 (6.66)	218.8 (8.61)	217.2 (8.55)	139.5 (5.49)	2,001.1 (78.78)
Average precipitation days	14	13	17	20	20	17	16	14	17	21	20	16	199
Average relative humidity (%)	84	83	84	85	86	84	81	79	82	85	86	86	84
Mean monthly sunshine hours	155.0	138.3	130.2	111.0	117.8	126.0	173.6	173.6	138.0	108.5	108.0	127.1	1,607.1
Mean daily sunshine hours	5.0	4.9	4.2	3.7	3.8	4.2	5.6	5.6	4.6	3.5	3.6	4.1	4.4
Source: Instituto de Hidrologia Meteorologia y Estudios Ambientales

== Tourism ==
One of the main characteristics of the town is the yearly observance of religious holidays and local fairs.

Sites of interest

- Tatamá National Natural Park
- Maria Inmaculada's Church
- Calle Real

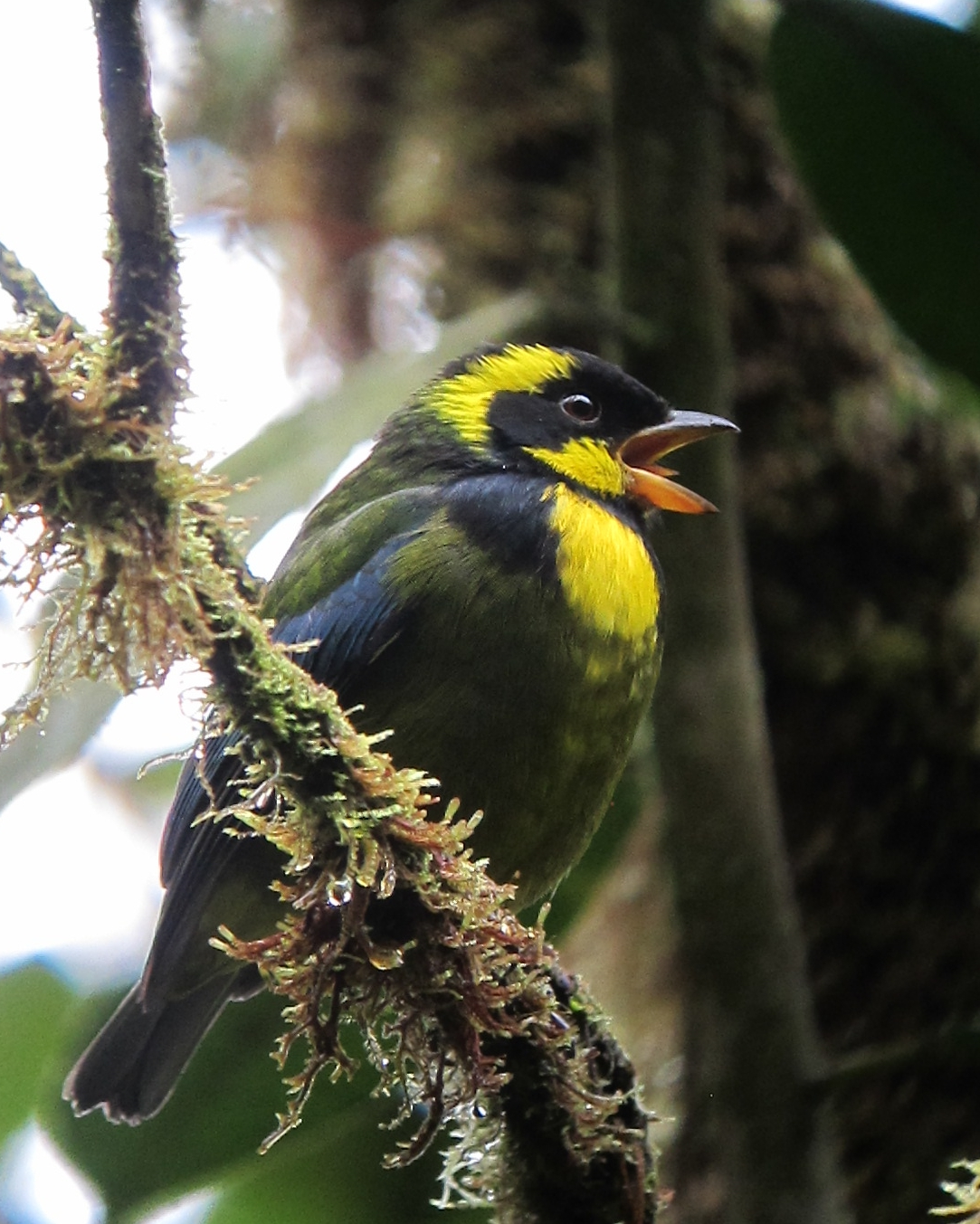
Gold-ringed Tanager (Bangsia aureocincta), an endemic bird species found in Tatamá.
