= Santa Rosa de Cabal =

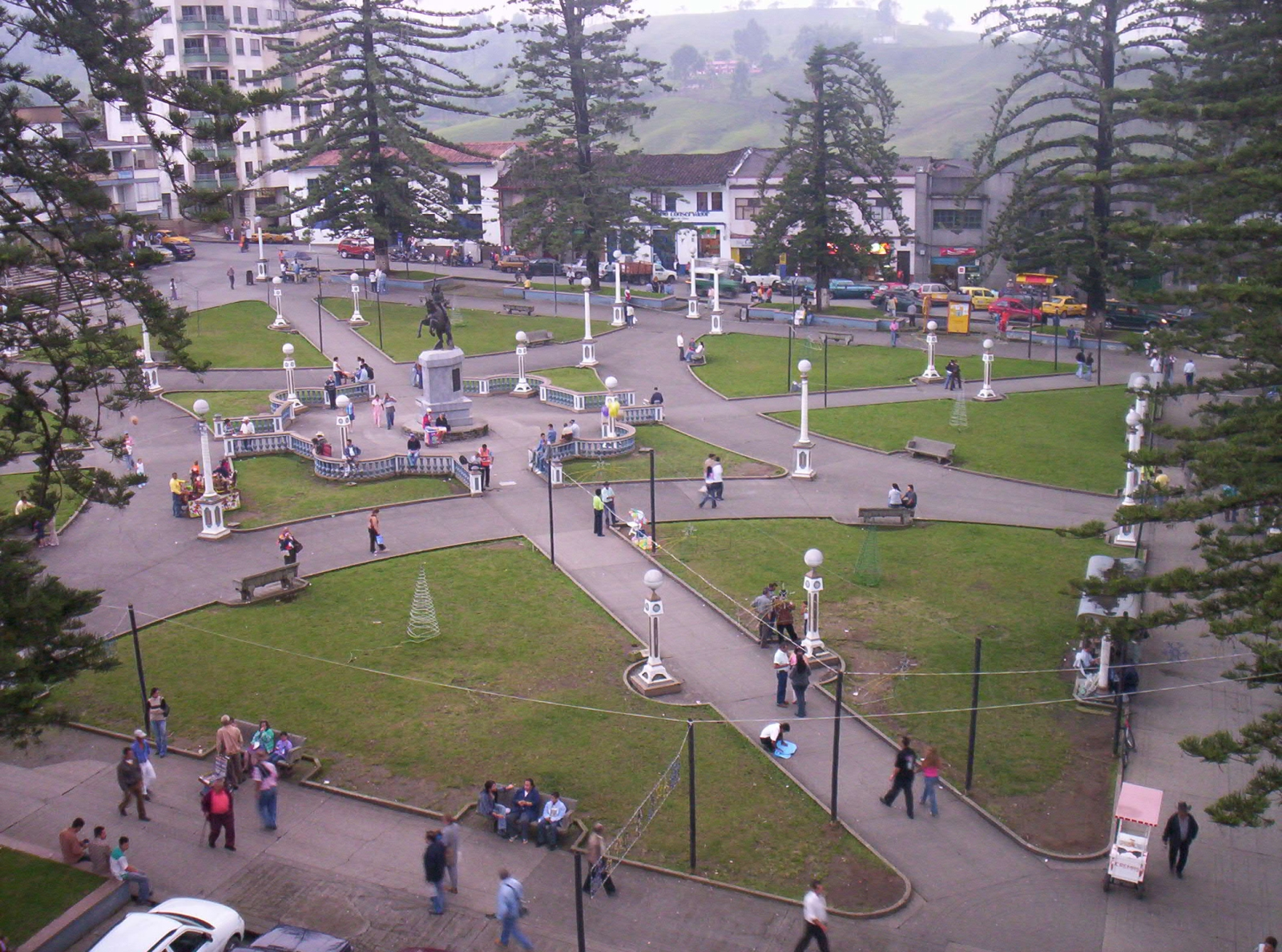
- Las Araucarias Park in downtown Santa Rosa de Cabal.

- Flag Coat of arms

- Location of the town and municipality of Santa Rosa de Cabal in Risaralda Department.

- Location within Colombia
- Coordinates: 4°52′N 75°37′W
- Country: Colombia
- Department: Risaralda
- Foundation: October 13, 1844

Area
  - City: 486 km^{2} (188 sq mi)
  - Urban: 20 km^{2} (7.7 sq mi)
- Elevation: 1,715 m (5,627 ft)

Population (2023)
  - City: 79,840
  - Density: 164/km^{2} (425/sq mi)
- Demonym: Santarrosanos
- Time zone: UTC-5
- Area code: 57 + 6
- Website: Official website (in Spanish)

Santa Rosa de Cabal is a town and municipality in the Department of Risaralda, Colombia. About 14 km away from the capital Pereira. In 2023 the town had an estimated population of 79,840.

== History ==
Founded in 1844 when the colonizer Fermín López, accompanied by a group made up of Juan Ignacio Gallego, Irene Londoño, Ignacio Vásquez, José Antonio Pino, Lorenzo Gonzalez, José Hurtado, Nepomuceno Vásquez, Pedro Gallego and Vicente Vásquez, among others, created the birth of the municipality between the years 1843 and 1844.

In 1852, on October 13, Santa Rosa de Cabal was declared a municipality.

== Climate ==
Santa Rosa de Cabal has a subtropical highland climate with an average annual temperature of 19°C.

Climate data for Santa Rosa de Cabal (Veracruz), elevation 1,720 m (5,640 ft), (1981–2010)
Month	Jan	Feb	Mar	Apr	May	Jun	Jul	Aug	Sep	Oct	Nov	Dec	Year
Mean daily maximum °C (°F)	24.2 (75.6)	24.3 (75.7)	24.1 (75.4)	23.7 (74.7)	23.6 (74.5)	23.6 (74.5)	24.0 (75.2)	24.0 (75.2)	23.7 (74.7)	23.3 (73.9)	23.2 (73.8)	23.6 (74.5)	23.8 (74.8)
Daily mean °C (°F)	18.9 (66.0)	19.1 (66.4)	19.1 (66.4)	18.8 (65.8)	18.7 (65.7)	18.7 (65.7)	19.0 (66.2)	18.9 (66.0)	18.7 (65.7)	18.3 (64.9)	18.4 (65.1)	18.6 (65.5)	18.8 (65.8)
Mean daily minimum °C (°F)	14.5 (58.1)	14.7 (58.5)	14.9 (58.8)	14.8 (58.6)	14.8 (58.6)	14.7 (58.5)	14.5 (58.1)	14.5 (58.1)	14.4 (57.9)	14.3 (57.7)	14.5 (58.1)	14.4 (57.9)	14.6 (58.3)
Average precipitation mm (inches)	173.7 (6.84)	193.2 (7.61)	246.4 (9.70)	270.3 (10.64)	276.0 (10.87)	211.5 (8.33)	168.4 (6.63)	171.9 (6.77)	225.0 (8.86)	325.8 (12.83)	301.7 (11.88)	218.2 (8.59)	2,782.2 (109.54)
Average precipitation days	18	17	21	24	25	23	18	20	22	25	23	20	253
Average relative humidity (%)	85	84	84	86	87	86	85	84	85	87	87	85	86
Mean monthly sunshine hours	139.5	121.4	111.6	93.0	99.2	111.0	136.4	127.1	108.0	105.4	111.0	124.0	1,387.6
Mean daily sunshine hours	4.5	4.3	3.6	3.1	3.2	3.7	4.4	4.1	3.6	3.4	3.7	4.0	3.8
Source: Instituto de Hidrologia Meteorologia y Estudios Ambientales

Climate data for Santa Rosa de Cabal (Jazmin El), elevation 1,600 m (5,200 ft), (1981–2010)
Month	Jan	Feb	Mar	Apr	May	Jun	Jul	Aug	Sep	Oct	Nov	Dec	Year
Mean daily maximum °C (°F)	25.2 (77.4)	25.2 (77.4)	25.5 (77.9)	24.5 (76.1)	24.3 (75.7)	24.9 (76.8)	25.3 (77.5)	25.3 (77.5)	24.7 (76.5)	23.7 (74.7)	23.9 (75.0)	24.6 (76.3)	24.7 (76.5)
Daily mean °C (°F)	19.8 (67.6)	20.0 (68.0)	20.2 (68.4)	19.6 (67.3)	19.4 (66.9)	19.7 (67.5)	20.0 (68.0)	20.1 (68.2)	19.4 (66.9)	18.7 (65.7)	18.8 (65.8)	19.4 (66.9)	19.6 (67.3)
Mean daily minimum °C (°F)	15.5 (59.9)	15.6 (60.1)	15.9 (60.6)	15.6 (60.1)	15.5 (59.9)	15.6 (60.1)	15.4 (59.7)	15.6 (60.1)	15.1 (59.2)	14.9 (58.8)	15.1 (59.2)	15.3 (59.5)	15.4 (59.7)
Average precipitation mm (inches)	188.7 (7.43)	173.0 (6.81)	209.2 (8.24)	292.8 (11.53)	242.9 (9.56)	178.8 (7.04)	157.6 (6.20)	173.7 (6.84)	189.2 (7.45)	297.5 (11.71)	275.9 (10.86)	174.4 (6.87)	2,545.1 (100.20)
Average relative humidity (%)	80	81	81	83	85	82	79	80	82	84	83	81	82
Mean monthly sunshine hours	158.1	135.5	136.4	111.0	111.6	126.0	161.2	148.8	126.0	108.5	108.0	133.3	1,564.4
Mean daily sunshine hours	5.1	4.8	4.4	3.7	3.6	4.2	5.2	4.8	4.2	3.5	3.6	4.3	4.3
Source: Instituto de Hidrologia Meteorologia y Estudios Ambientales

Climate data for Santa Rosa de Cabal (San Remo), elevation 2,000 m (6,600 ft), (1981–2010)
Month	Jan	Feb	Mar	Apr	May	Jun	Jul	Aug	Sep	Oct	Nov	Dec	Year
Mean daily maximum °C (°F)	21.8 (71.2)	22.0 (71.6)	21.9 (71.4)	21.6 (70.9)	21.5 (70.7)	21.6 (70.9)	21.9 (71.4)	22.3 (72.1)	21.5 (70.7)	21.2 (70.2)	20.9 (69.6)	21.3 (70.3)	21.6 (70.9)
Daily mean °C (°F)	17.0 (62.6)	17.2 (63.0)	17.2 (63.0)	17.2 (63.0)	17.3 (63.1)	17.2 (63.0)	17.3 (63.1)	17.4 (63.3)	17.0 (62.6)	16.8 (62.2)	16.8 (62.2)	16.9 (62.4)	17.1 (62.8)
Mean daily minimum °C (°F)	13.3 (55.9)	13.5 (56.3)	13.7 (56.7)	14.0 (57.2)	14.1 (57.4)	14.0 (57.2)	13.9 (57.0)	13.8 (56.8)	13.7 (56.7)	13.6 (56.5)	13.6 (56.5)	13.4 (56.1)	13.7 (56.7)
Average precipitation mm (inches)	174.7 (6.88)	165.1 (6.50)	242.5 (9.55)	298.1 (11.74)	278.0 (10.94)	197.3 (7.77)	140.4 (5.53)	150.3 (5.92)	212.2 (8.35)	309.6 (12.19)	274.5 (10.81)	224.0 (8.82)	2,551.3 (100.44)
Average precipitation days	16	16	20	24	23	21	19	18	22	25	24	19	236
Average relative humidity (%)	84	83	85	87	87	86	84	83	85	86	87	86	85
Source: Instituto de Hidrologia Meteorologia y Estudios Ambientales

== Tourism ==
It's a commercial and manufacturing centre for the fertile agricultural and pastoral hinterland. Silkworms are raised in the vicinity. There are silver, gold, and mercury mines nearby.

A thermal pool called "Termales de Santa Rosa" is open for visitors.

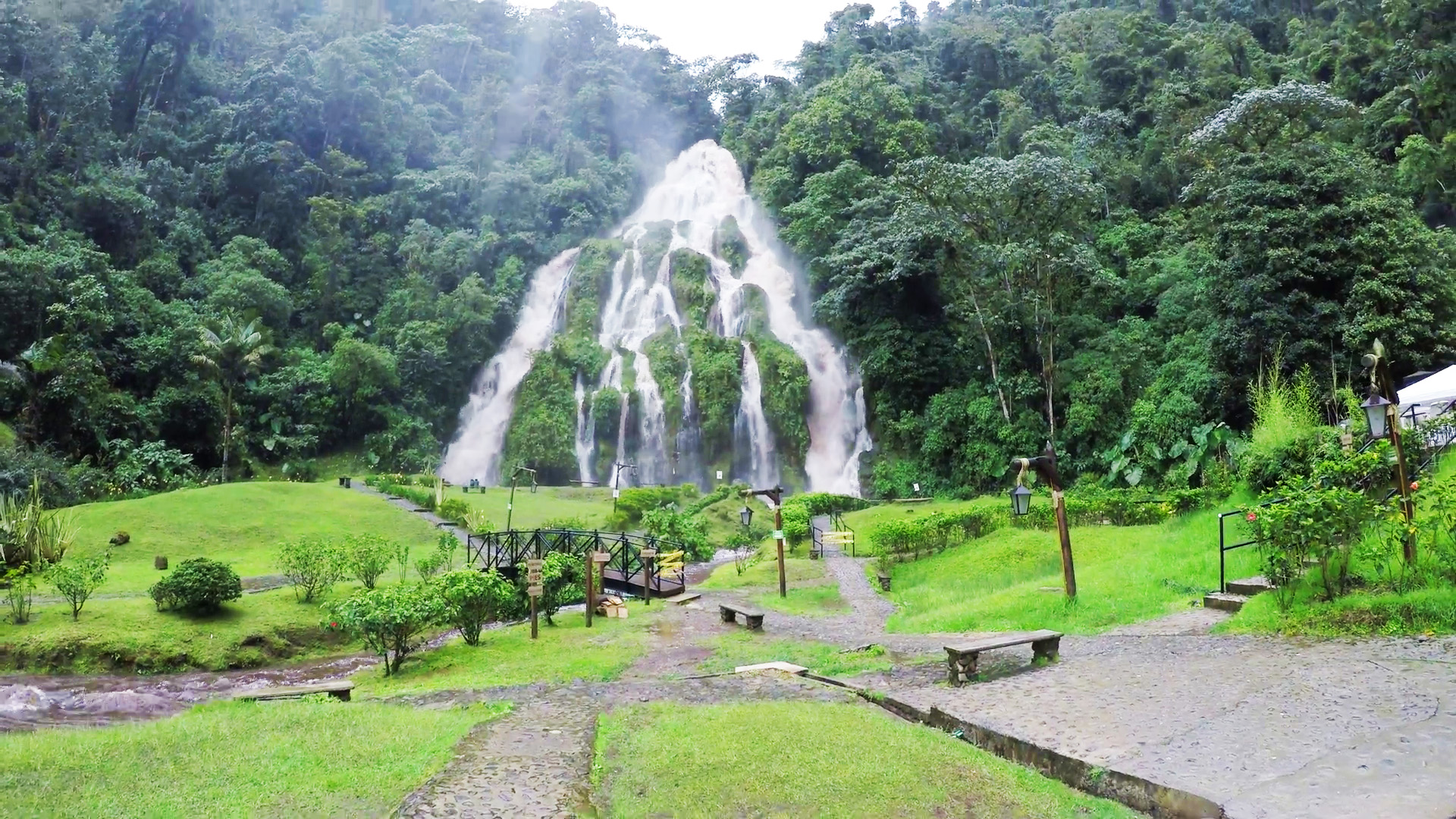
Termales Santa Rosa de Cabal

== Symbols ==
Flag: Rectangle of proportions 1:2 terciated by fess white, green and white. Alternatively: On a field Argent 1:2 a fess Vert.

Coat of arms: Party per pale and per chevron reduced engrailed Argent, Vert and Gules. In saltire over the first two fields, a Latin cross bendwise Gules surmounted by an axe bendwise sinister Proper, its blade upward and inward. On middle base a rose Argent barbed and seeded Or. The shield is ensigned by a three-towered mural crown Or with doors Sable. On a scroll Azure the motto 'Somos Libres' Sable.

In Spanish: Escudo partido y entado en punta. Primero, campo de plata. Segundo, campo de sinople. Brochante sobre ambos campos, una cruz latina de goles y un hacha en natural, dispuestos en sautor. Tercero, en campo de gules una rosa de plata con semillas y espinas de oro. Encima una corona mural de tres torres. En listel de blau 'Somos Libres' en sable.
