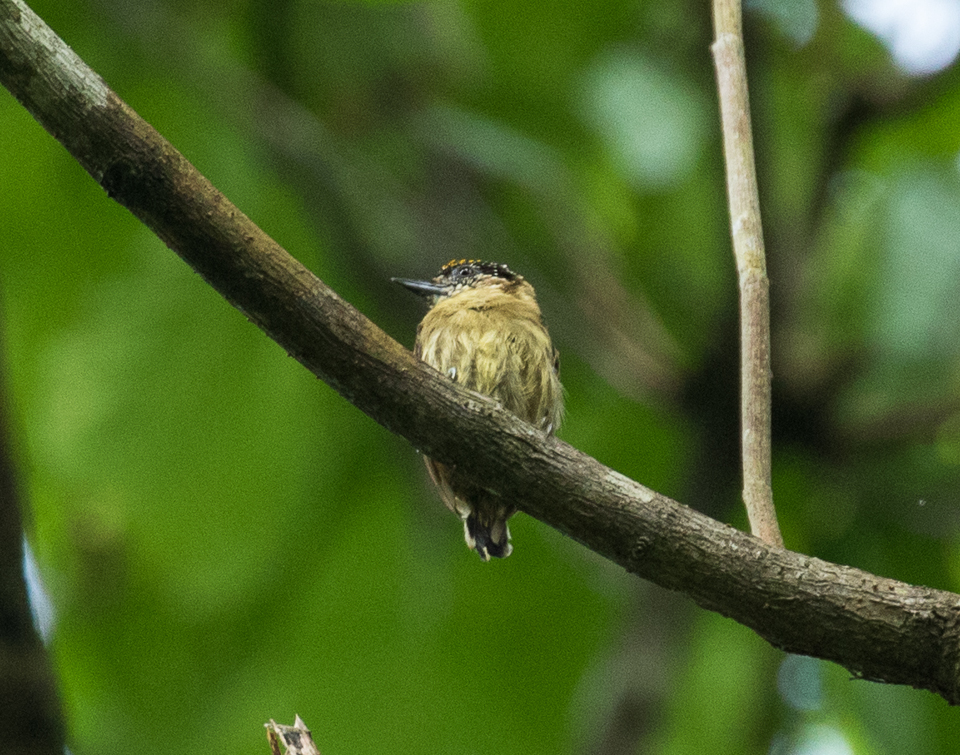

Conservation status
- Least Concern (IUCN 3.1)

Scientific classification
- Kingdom: Animalia
- Phylum: Chordata
- Class: Aves
- Order: Piciformes
- Family: Picidae
- Genus: Picumnus
- Species: P. olivaceus

Binomial name
- Picumnus olivaceus Lafresnaye, 1845

= Olivaceous piculet =

Species of woodpecker

The olivaceous piculet (Picumnus olivaceus) is a species of bird in subfamily Picumninae of the woodpecker family Picidae. It is found from Guatemala south through Central America and western South America to Peru.

== Taxonomy and systematics ==
The olivaceous piculet has these six subspecies:

- P. o. dimotus Bangs, 1903
- P. o. flavotinctus Ridgway, 1889
- P. o. olivaceus Lafresnaye, 1845
- P. o. eisenmanni Phelps, W.H. Jr. & Aveledo, 1966
- P. o. tachirensis Phelps, W.H. & Gilliard, 1941
- P. o. harterti Hellmayr, 1909

The olivaceous piculet and the grayish piculet (P. granadensis) were at one time considered to be conspecific and are now treated as sister species. The "evidence for treatment as separate species is weak". Some authors have proposed splitting each of subspecies flavotinctus and olivaceous into two subspecies but those changes have not been accepted.

== Description ==
The olivaceous piculet is 8.5 to 10 cm (3.3 to 3.9 in) long and weighs 10 to 15 g (0.35 to 0.53 oz). Adult males of the nominate subspecies P. o. olivaceus have a black crown and nape with red tips on the feathers of the front and top and white spots on the rest. Their face is mostly brown with white feather tips. Their upperparts are olive-brown with a yellow tinge. Their flight feathers are dark brown with yellow to yellow-green edges. Their tail is brown; the innermost pair of feathers have pale buff or yellowish inner webs and the outer two pairs a pale buff or yellowish stripe. Their chin and throat are buff to yellowish white with a fine darker scaly appearance. Their underparts are yellowish brown on the breast becoming buffish white to dull yellowish on the belly; the belly and flanks have wide but variable brownish streaks. Their iris is dark brown, the beak black with a gray base to the mandible, the bare skin around the eye gray to blue-gray, and the legs gray with a green or blue tinge. Adult females are identical but with white spots on the whole crown and no red. Juveniles are duller and browner than adults and sometimes have paler and more heavily streaked underparts.

The other subspecies have some differences from the nominate. P. o. dimotus has more of a greenish tinge to the upperparts, is paler and more olive below, and has yellow-orange tips on the crown feathers. P. o. flavotinctus has darker and more olive upperparts, more olive underparts, and yellow on the crown. P. o. eisenmanni has much yellower upperparts, a pale yellowish olive breast and yellow belly, and orange to yellow on the crown. P. o. tachirensis has green-tinged upperparts and orange to yellow on the crown. P. o. harterti is a darker olive overall with yellow to golden on the crown.

== Distribution and habitat ==
The subspecies of the olivaceous piculet are found thus:

- P. o. dimotus, eastern Guatemala, northern Honduras, and eastern Nicaragua
- P. o. flavotinctus, Costa Rica, Panama, and Colombia's northern Chocó Department
- P. o. olivaceus, Colombia from Sucre Department south in the Andes to Cauca Department and east to Huila Department
- P. o. eisenmanni, the Serranía del Perijá in extreme northwestern Venezuela; possibly in adjacent northern Colombia
- P. o. tachirensis, eastern slope of Colombia's Eastern Andes and adjacent southwestern Venezuela
- P. o. harterti, from southwestern Colombia south through western Ecuador into northwestern Peru.

The olivaceous piculet inhabits a wide variety of landscapes including the edges of rainforest and cloudforest, drier forest, more open woodlands, secondary forest, plantations, and gardens. It shuns the interior of mature forest. In most of its range it is a bird of the lowlands but reaches 500 m (1,600 ft) in Guatemala and Honduras, 1,400 m (4,600 ft) in Costa Rica, 1,600 m (5,200 ft) on Panama's Pacific slope, 2,300 m (7,500 ft) in Venezuela, 1,800 m (5,900 ft) in Colombia, and 900 m (3,000 ft) in Ecuador.

== Behavior ==
=== Movement ===
The olivaceous piculet is a year-round resident throughout its range.

=== Feeding ===
The olivaceous piculet forages on slender branches, stems, and vines, usually from the forest undergrowth to its mid-storey, though sometimes in the canopy. It is typically seen singly, in pairs, or in small family groups and frequently joins mixed species foraging flocks. Its primary diet is ant and termite adults, larvae, and pupae. It also takes beetles and the eggs of cockroaches. It extracts them from holes it drills and gleans them from twigs and leaves.

=== Breeding ===
The olivaceous piculet's breeding season varies latitudinally, for example from December to May in Costa Rica and February to September in Colombia. Both sexes excavate a nest hole in rotting wood including fence posts, typically within about 2 m (7 ft) of the ground though sometimes as high as 9 m (30 ft). The clutch size is two or three eggs. Both parents incubate the clutch and provision the young. The incubation period is 13 to 14 days and fledging occurs 24 to 25 days after hatch.

=== Vocalization ===
The olivaceous piculet's voice is "a high thin chippering trill, often descending in pitch." It also makes a "sharp sibilant 'sst, ssip-ssip' or 'peep'."

== Status ==
The IUCN has assessed the olivaceous piculet as being of Least Concern. It has a very large range and an estimated population of at least a half million mature individuals. However, the population is believed to be decreasing. No immediate threats have been identified. It is considered uncommon to fairly common in most of its range and occurs in several protected areas.
