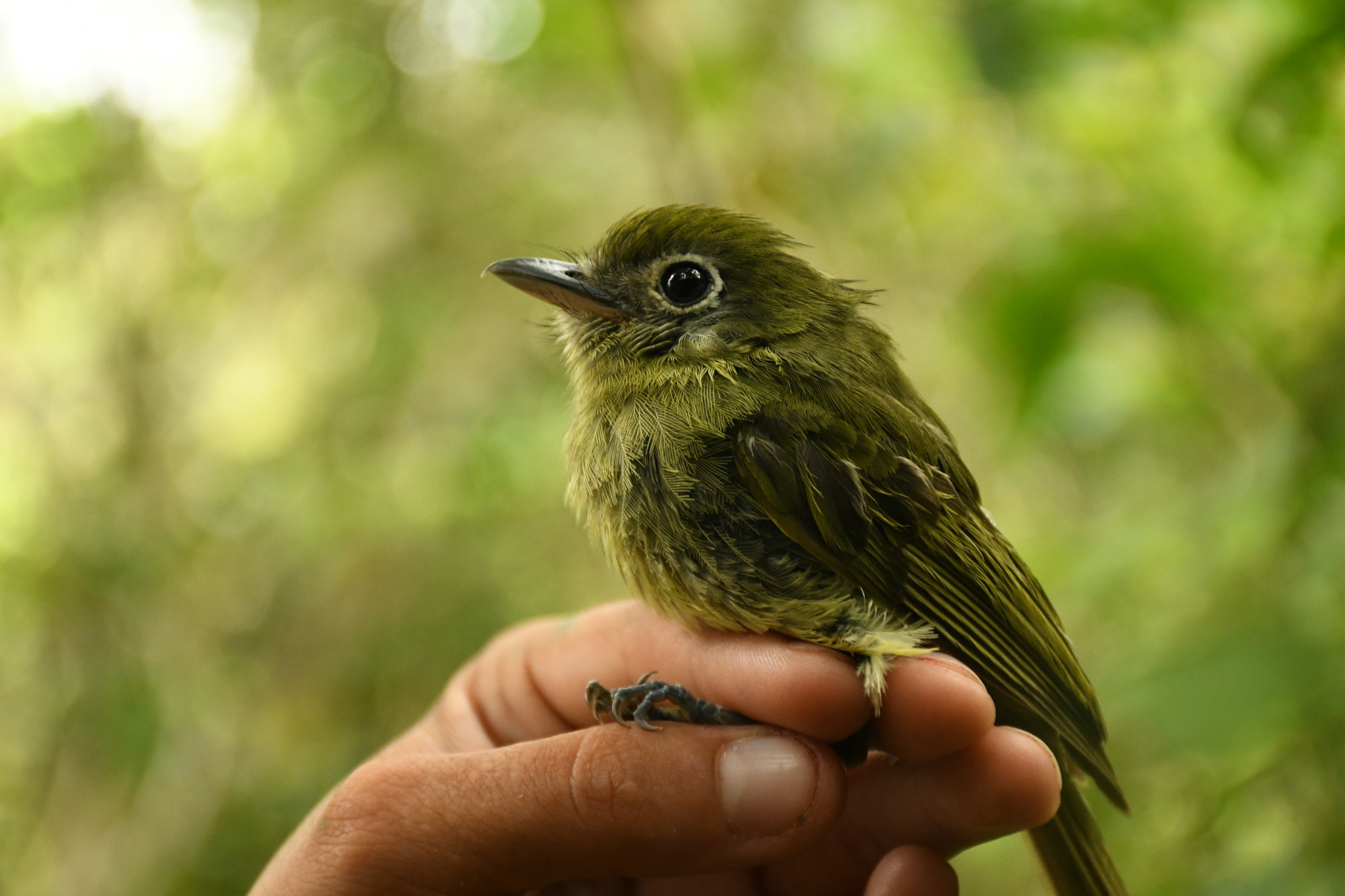

Conservation status
- Least Concern (IUCN 3.1)

Scientific classification
- Kingdom: Animalia
- Phylum: Chordata
- Class: Aves
- Order: Passeriformes
- Family: Tyrannidae
- Genus: Rhynchocyclus
- Species: R. brevirostris

Binomial name
- Rhynchocyclus brevirostris (Cabanis, 1847)
- range

= Eye-ringed flatbill =

Species of bird

The eye-ringed flatbill (Rhynchocyclus brevirostris) is a species of bird in the family Tyrannidae, the tyrant flycatchers. It is found in Mexico, every Central American country, and Colombia.

== Taxonomy and systematics ==
The eye-ringed flatbill was originally described in 1847 as Cyclorhynchus brevirostris. It has three subspecies, the nominate R. b. brevirostris (Cabanis, 1847), R. b. pallidus (Laurence C. Binford, 1965), and R. b. hellmayri (Griscom, 1932). For a time in the early twentieth century what is now the Pacific flatbill (R. pacificus) was also treated as a subspecies.

== Description ==
The eye-ringed flatbill is 15 to 17 cm (5.9 to 6.7 in) long and weighs 21 to 23 g (0.74 to 0.81 oz). The sexes have almost the same plumage. Adults have a bold white eye-ring, a faint dark smudge below the eye, grayish lores and cheeks, and a dusky patch behind grayish ear coverts. The rest of their head and their entire upperparts are olive-green. Their wings and tail are dusky with paler yellow-olive edges on the feathers. Males have stiff comb-like barbs on the outer primaries; females lack them. In both sexes the throat and upper breast are dull to dusky olive-green that becomes paler and has pale grayish yellowish streaks on the lower breast and sides. Their belly is pale yellow. Subspecies R. b. pallidus is slightly paler than the nominate but otherwise the same. R. b. hellmayri is overall darker than the nominate and has a darker yellow belly. Both sexes of all subspecies have a dark iris, a large wide and flat bill with a black maxilla and pale horn mandible, and gray legs and feet.

== Distribution and habitat ==
The eye-ringed flatbill has a disjunct distribution. The nominate subspecies is by far the most widespread of the three. It is found from southern Veracruz, eastern Oaxaca, and the Yucatán Peninsula in southern Mexico south on the Pacific slope through western Guatemala into El Salvador. In the east it is found south from Mexico through Belize, central and eastern Guatemala (except for a gap in the middle), eastern Nicaragua, and eastern Costa Rica into Panama to Veraguas Province. It also occurs on the Pacific slope from west-central Costa Rica south and across northern Panama to merge with the eastern Panama part of its range. Subspecies R. b. pallidus is found on the Pacific slope of Mexico in western Oaxaca and probably further north in adjoining Guerrero. R. b. hellmayri is found from Darién Province in eastern Panama slightly into Chocó Department in extreme northwestern Colombia.

The eye-ringed flatbill inhabits the interior and edges of humid evergreen and semi-deciduous forest, cloudforest, and nearby secondary forest. It mostly occurs from the upper edge of the forest understory to its mid-level, and especially favors shady ravines. In Mexico and most of Central America it ranges from sea level to 2,100 m (6,900 ft), in Panama between 600 and 1,500 m (2,000 and 4,900 ft), and in Colombia between 600 and 1,700 m (2,000 and 5,600 ft).

== Behavior ==
=== Movement ===
The eye-ringed flatbill is mostly a year-round resident. In Mexico it descends to lower elevations during the December to March non-breeding season.

=== Feeding ===
The eye-ringed flatbill feeds primarily on a variety of arthropods and also includes berries and seeds in its diet. It typically forages singly but often joins mixed-species feeding flocks and in Costa Rica is known to attend army ant swarms. It tends to be sluggish, peering around from a perch in the upper understory. It captures prey with upward sallies to snatch or hover-glean it from leaves and twigs. It only rarely takes prey in mid-air. It typically lands on a different perch after a sally.

=== Breeding ===
The eye-ringed flatbill breeds between March and June in Mexico and Costa Rica; its season elsewhere is not known. Its nest is a large pear-shaped mass with downward sloping tunnel entrance that slopes up to near the bottom of the nest. It is made from rootlets, plant fibers, and dead leaves. It is suspended from the tip of a twig or a vine, typically over an open space or a small watercourse, and can be anywhere between 1.5 and 12 m (5 and 39 ft) above the ground. Adults roost in the nest year-round. The clutch size it two eggs. The incubation period, time to fledging, and details of parental care are not known.

=== Vocalization ===
The eye-ringed flatbill is "secretive and hard to locate" except by voice. Its vocalizations include "a thin, buzzy, insect-like zweeeeeeee-zweeeee (each part slightly rising) or zeeeee-zeeeee-zeeeee-zweeeeee!, just a single zeeeeee [and] a high-pitched whistle, sweeeeet!".

== Status ==
The IUCN has assessed the eye-ringed Flatbill as being of Least Concern. It has a very large range; its estimated population of at least 50,000 mature individuals is believed to be decreasing. No immediate threats have been identified. It is considered uncommon in northern Central America, "fairly uncommon" in Costa Rica, and "local and uncommon" in Colombia. It occurs in some protected areas but is "[p]robably locally extinct wherever deforestation has been intense, e.g. in lowlands in Panama".
