= Chalybea minor =

Conservation status
- Least Concern (IUCN 3.1)

Scientific classification
- Kingdom: Plantae
- Clade: Tracheophytes
- Clade: Angiosperms
- Clade: Eudicots
- Clade: Rosids
- Order: Myrtales
- Family: Melastomataceae
- Genus: Chalybea
- Species: C. minor

Binomial name
- Chalybea minor (L.Uribe) M.E.Morales & Penneys

Synonyms
- Huilaea macrocarpa subsp. minor L.Uribe; Huilaea minor (L.Uribe) Lozano & N.Ruiz-R.

Species of flowering plant

Chalybea minor is a species of plant in the family Melastomataceae. It is endemic to Boyacá and Santander in Colombia.
