= Chalybea =

Scientific classification
- Kingdom: Plantae
- Clade: Tracheophytes
- Clade: Angiosperms
- Clade: Eudicots
- Clade: Rosids
- Order: Myrtales
- Family: Melastomataceae
- Genus: Chalybea; Naudin

Genus of flowering plants

Chalybea is a genus of plants in the family Melastomataceae with about 11 accepted species. It is found in parts of South and North America, including Peru, Ecuador, Colombia, and Nevada in the US,

Species accepted (March 2021) include:

- Chalybea brevipedunculata Penneys, C.Ulloa & D.Fernández
- Chalybea calyptrata (Penneys & M.E.Morales) Penneys & M.E.Morales
- Chalybea corymbifera Naudin
- Chalybea ecuadorensis (Wurdack) M.E.Morales & Penneys
- Chalybea kirkbridei (Wurdack) M.E.Morales & Penneys
- Chalybea macrocarpa (L.Uribe) M.E.Morales & Penneys
- Chalybea minor (L.Uribe) M.E.Morales & Penneys
- Chalybea mutisiana (L.Uribe) M.E.Morales & Penneys
- Chalybea occidentalis (Lozano & N.Ruiz-R.) M.E.Morales & Penneys
- Chalybea penduliflora (Wurdack) M.E.Morales & Penneys
- Chalybea peruviana M.E.Morales & Penneys
