= Chalybea mutisiana =

Conservation status
- Endangered (IUCN 3.1)

Scientific classification
- Kingdom: Plantae
- Clade: Tracheophytes
- Clade: Angiosperms
- Clade: Eudicots
- Clade: Rosids
- Order: Myrtales
- Family: Melastomataceae
- Genus: Chalybea
- Species: C. mutisiana

Binomial name
- Chalybea mutisiana (L.Uribe) M.E.Morales & Penneys

Synonyms
- Huilaea mutisiana L.Uribe

Species of flowering plant

Chalybea mutisiana is a species of plant in the family Melastomataceae. It is endemic to Boyacá, Cauca, and Santander in Colombia.
