= Chalybea kirkbridei =

Conservation status
- Endangered (IUCN 3.1)

Scientific classification
- Kingdom: Plantae
- Clade: Tracheophytes
- Clade: Angiosperms
- Clade: Eudicots
- Clade: Rosids
- Order: Myrtales
- Family: Melastomataceae
- Genus: Chalybea
- Species: C. kirkbridei

Binomial name
- Chalybea kirkbridei (Wurdack) M.E.Morales & Penneys

Synonyms
- Huilaea kirkbridei Wurdack

Species of plant

Chalybea kirkbridei is a species of plant in the family Melastomataceae. It is endemic to Sierra Nevada de Santa Marta in Colombia.
