= Chalybea penduliflora =

Conservation status
- Least Concern (IUCN 3.1)

Scientific classification
- Kingdom: Plantae
- Clade: Tracheophytes
- Clade: Angiosperms
- Clade: Eudicots
- Clade: Rosids
- Order: Myrtales
- Family: Melastomataceae
- Genus: Chalybea
- Species: C. penduliflora

Binomial name
- Chalybea penduliflora (Wurdack) M.E.Morales & Penneys

Synonyms
- Huilaea penduliflora Wurdack

Species of flowering plant

Chalybea penduliflora is a species of plant in the family Melastomataceae. It is endemic to Caquetá, and Huila in Colombia.
