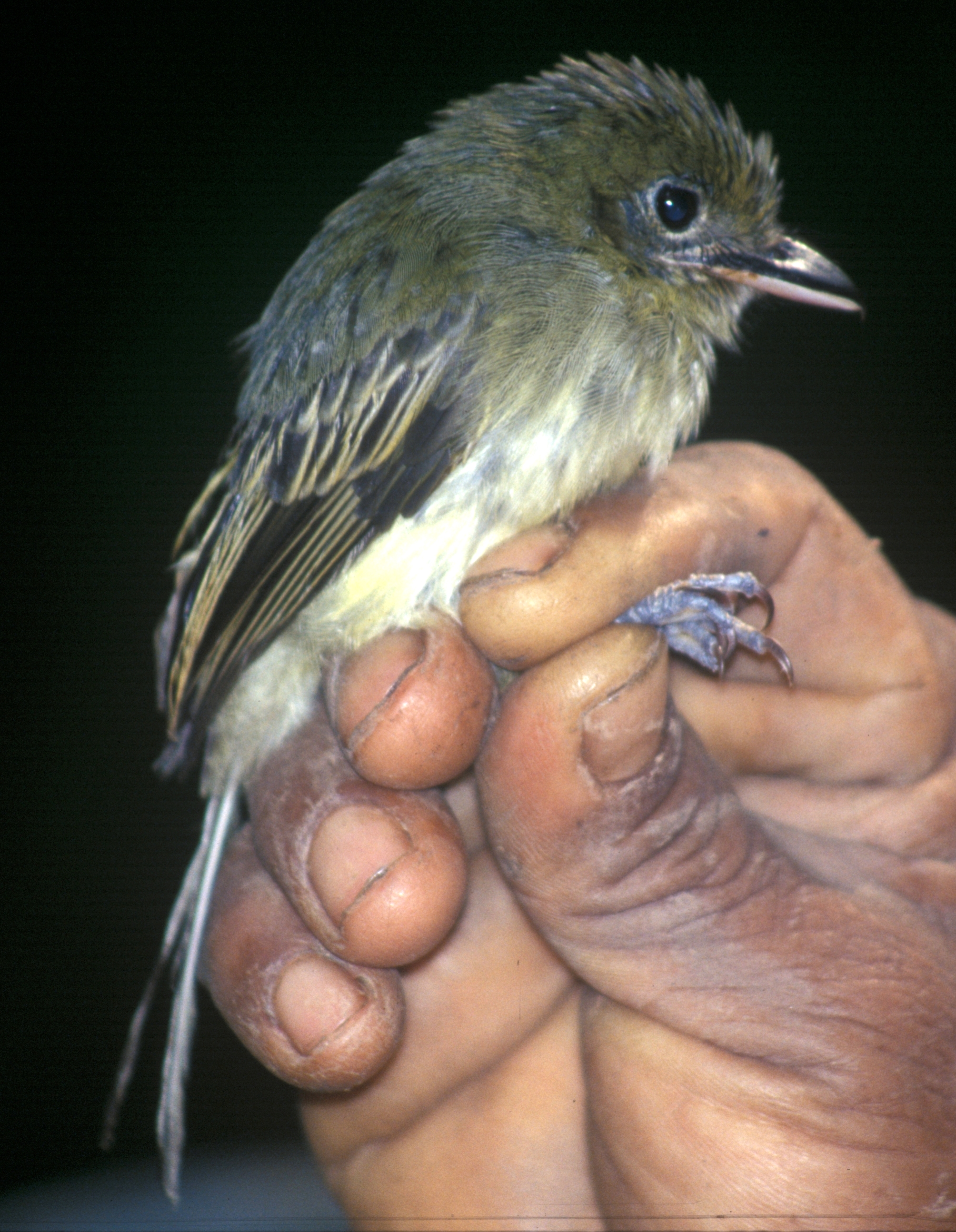
- Western olivaceous flatbill (R. aequinoctialis)

Scientific classification
- Kingdom: Animalia
- Phylum: Chordata
- Class: Aves
- Order: Passeriformes
- Family: Tyrannidae
- Genus: Rhynchocyclus; Cabanis & Heine, 1860

Type species
- Cyclorhynchus olivaceus Desmarest=Platyrhynchos olivaceus Temminck

Species
- 5, see text

Synonyms
- Cyclorhynchus Sundevall, 1836 (non Kaup, 1829: preoccupied)

= Rhynchocyclus =

Genus of birds

Rhynchocyclus is a genus of passerine birds in the tyrant flycatcher family Tyrannidae.

== Taxonomy ==
The genus Rhynchocyclus was introduced in 1860 by the German ornithologists Jean Cabanis and Ferdinand Heine as a replacement name for Cyclorhynchus that had been introduced in 1836 by Carl Jakob Sundevall. The name Cyclorhynchus was preoccupied by Cyclorrhynchus that had been introduced in 1829 by Johann Jakob Kaup. The type species is Cyclorhynchus olivaceus Desmarest which is a junior synonym of Platyrhynchos olivaceus Temminck, the eastern olivaceous flatbill. The genus name Rhynchocyclus is an anagram of the original name Cyclorhynchus. The latter combines the Ancient Greek κύκλος/kúklos meaning "circle" or "shield" with ῥύγχος /rhúnkhos meaning "bill".

The genus contains five species:

Image	Scientific name	Common name	Distribution
	Rhynchocyclus brevirostris	Eye-ringed flatbill	Belize, Colombia, Costa Rica, El Salvador, Guatemala, Honduras, Mexico, Nicaragua, and Panama, with a slight incursion into Colombia
	Rhynchocyclus pacificus	Pacific flatbill	Colombia and Ecuador.
	Rhynchocyclus olivaceus	Eastern olivaceous flatbill	Brazil, Colombia, French Guiana, Guyana, Suriname, and Venezuela.
	Rhynchocyclus aequinoctialis	Western olivaceous flatbill	Bolivia, Colombia, Ecuador, Panama, Peru, and Venezuela.
	Rhynchocyclus fulvipectus	Fulvous-breasted flatbill	Bolivia, Colombia, Ecuador, Peru, and Venezuela.
