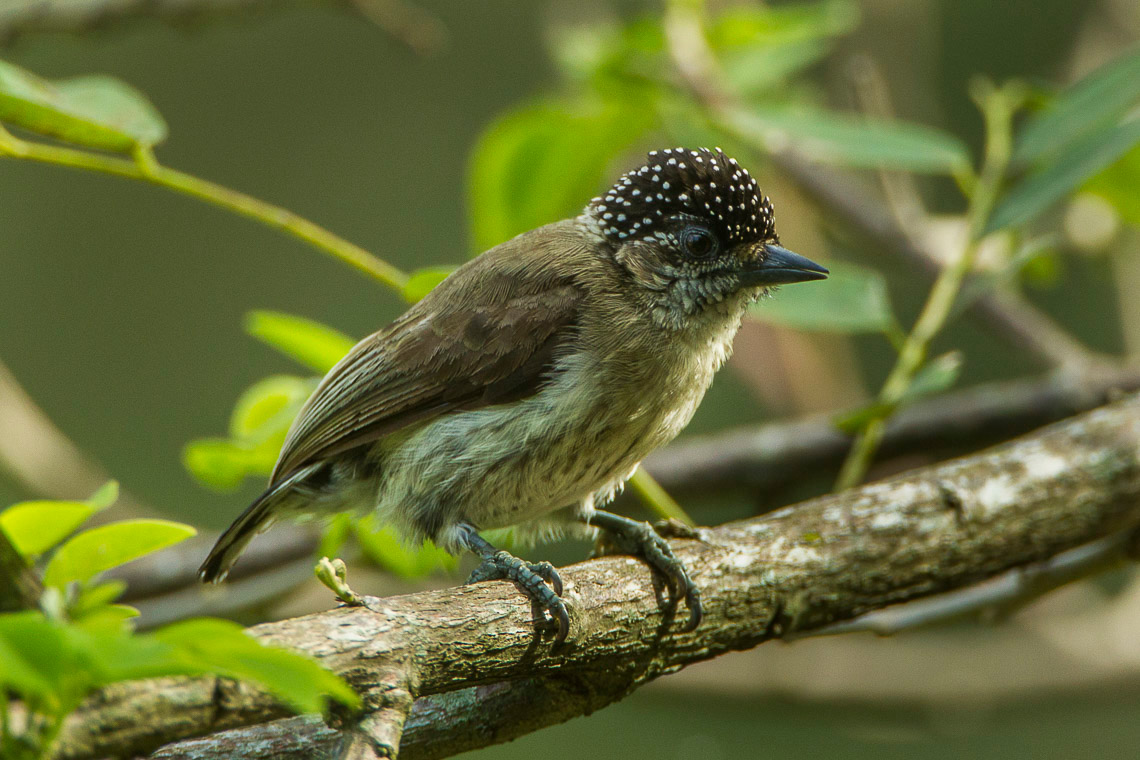

Conservation status
- Least Concern (IUCN 3.1)

Scientific classification
- Kingdom: Animalia
- Phylum: Chordata
- Class: Aves
- Order: Piciformes
- Family: Picidae
- Genus: Picumnus
- Species: P. granadensis

Binomial name
- Picumnus granadensis Lafresnaye, 1847

= Greyish piculet =

Species of woodpecker

The greyish piculet (Picumnus granadensis) is a species of bird in subfamily Picumninae of the woodpecker family Picidae. It is endemic to Colombia.

== Taxonomy and systematics ==
The greyish piculet has two described subspecies, the nominate P. g. granadensis and P. g. antioquensis (Chapman, 1915). The greyish piculet and the olivaceous piculet (P. olivaceus) were at one time considered to be conspecific and are now treated as sister species. However, the "evidence for treatment as separate species is weak".

== Description ==
The greyish piculet is 9 to 10 cm (3.5 to 3.9 in) long and weighs 12 to 13 g (0.42 to 0.46 oz). Adult males of the nominate subspecies have a black crown and nape with small yellow tips on the feathers of the front and top and white spots on the rest. Their ear coverts are chestnut brown with a few white streaks, their cheeks off-white with blackish feather tips, and the sides of their neck gray-brown with white spots or streaks. Their hindneck and upperparts are grayish brown, often with an olive tinge. Their flight feathers are dark brown with yellowish green edges. Their tail is dark brown; the innermost pair of feathers have white inner webs and the outer two pairs a white stripe. Their chin and throat are off-white with blackish feather tips. Their underparts are dull white; the flanks sometimes have fine grayish streaks. Their iris is brown, the beak black, the bare skin around the eye gray-blue, and the legs gray with a green or blue tinge. Adult females are identical but with white spots on the whole crown and no yellow. Juveniles are duller and darker than adults and have more heavily streaked underparts. Subspecies P. g. antioquensis has grayer upperparts and more obvious gray streaking on their belly and flanks than the nominate.

== Distribution and habitat ==
Subspecies P. g. antioquensis of the greyish piculet is the more northern. It is found in northwestern Colombia on the western slope of the Western Andes between Antioquia Department and the upper reaches of the Rio San Juan. The nominate is found in western Colombia from the middle and upper reaches of the Rio Cauca south to the upper Rio Patía. It inhabits semi-open landscapes like the edges of dry to somewhat humid primary and secondary forest, scrublands, and open woodlands. In elevation it mostly ranges between 800 and 2,100 m (2,600 and 6,900 ft) though it might be found as low as 600 m (2,000 ft) in the northern part of its range.

== Behavior ==
=== Movement ===
The greyish piculet is a year-round resident throughout its range.

=== Feeding ===
No details are known about the greyish piculet's foraging technique or diet, though they are assumed to be similar to those of the olivaceous piculet, which see here.

=== Breeding ===
The greyish piculet's breeding season appears to span approximately January to June. Nothing else is known about its breeding biology.

=== Vocalization ===
The greyish piculet "[c]alls infrequently, a high-pitched weak trill on one pitch."

== Status ==
The IUCN has assessed the greyish piculet as being of Least Concern. It has a small range and its population size is unknown and believed to be decreasing, but none of the criteria pass the threshold to rate it Near Threatened. No immediate threats have been identified.
