= Marsella =

Coordinates: 4°55′N 75°45′W

- Municipality and town
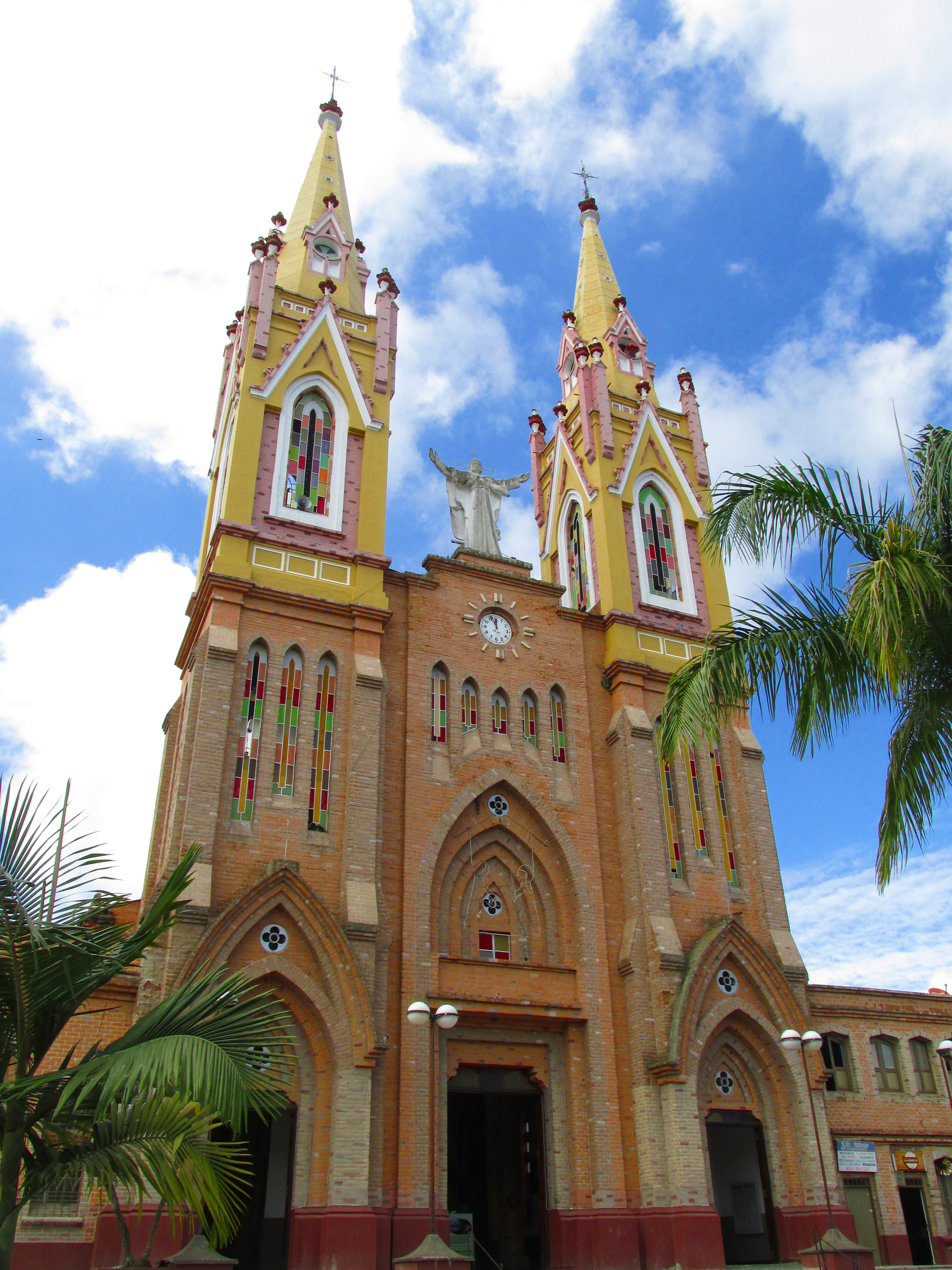
- Mary Immaculate Church in Marseille

- Flag Coat of arms

- Location of the municipality and town of Marsella in the Risaralda Department of Colombia
- Country: Colombia
- Department: Risaralda Department
- Elevation: 1,575 m (5,167 ft)

Population (2023)
  - Total: 17,208
- Time zone: UTC-5 (Colombia Standard Time)

"Marsella" is also the Spanish name of Marseille.

Marsella or Marseille is a town and municipality in the Department of Risaralda in Colombia. About 30 km away from the capital Pereira. In 2023 the town had an estimated population of 17,208.

== History ==
It was founded in 1915 by Pedro Pineda, Nepomuceno Correa and José Bedoya, among others.

Initially it was known as Villa Rica and in 1864, by the will of General Tomás Cipriano de Mosquera, it was added: Segovia. On April 8, 1915, Villa Rica de Segovia was renamed Marseille and finally July 18, 1915 was recognized as the date of its foundation as a municipality.

== Climate ==
Marsella has a subtropical highland climate with an average annual temperature of 18 °C.

== Tourism ==
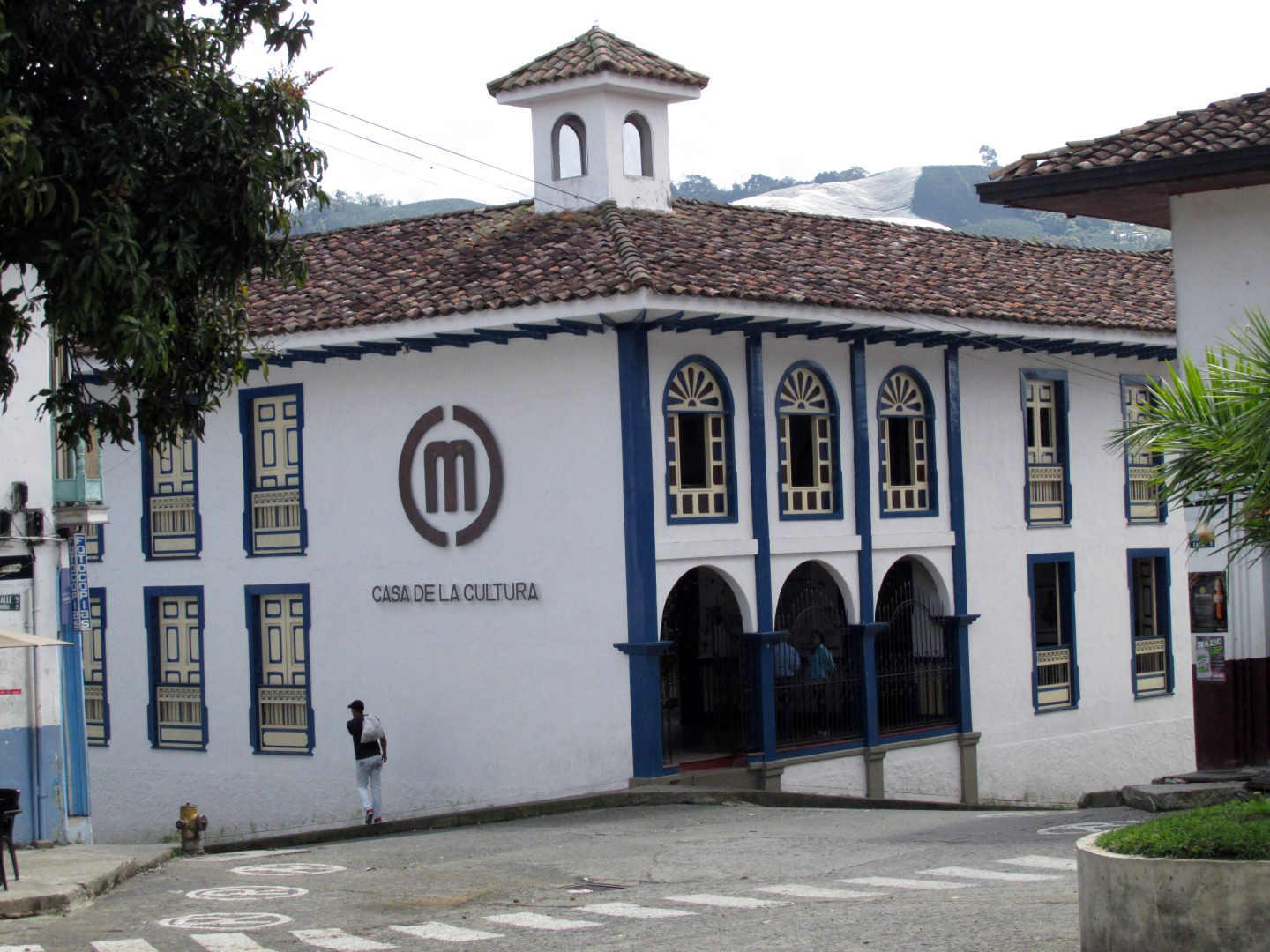
House of culture

Marsella is a colonial town is famous for its botanic garden Jardin Bontanico Marsella Alejandro Hombolt which was set up to promote ecological sustainability in the area, with a range of plants and wildlife as well as an education section with hands on science demonstrations of things like parabolic disks for bouncing sounds across the countryside, and the world's first catapult museum, set up in collaboration with local schools to preserve wildlife by getting children to donate their catapults to the museum.

The town also has an historic cemetery Cementerio Jesus Maria Estrada, a colonial-style cultural centre and church in the main square and traditional galleria (market).

== See also ==
Marsella is also the Spanish name for Marseille, the city in France.
