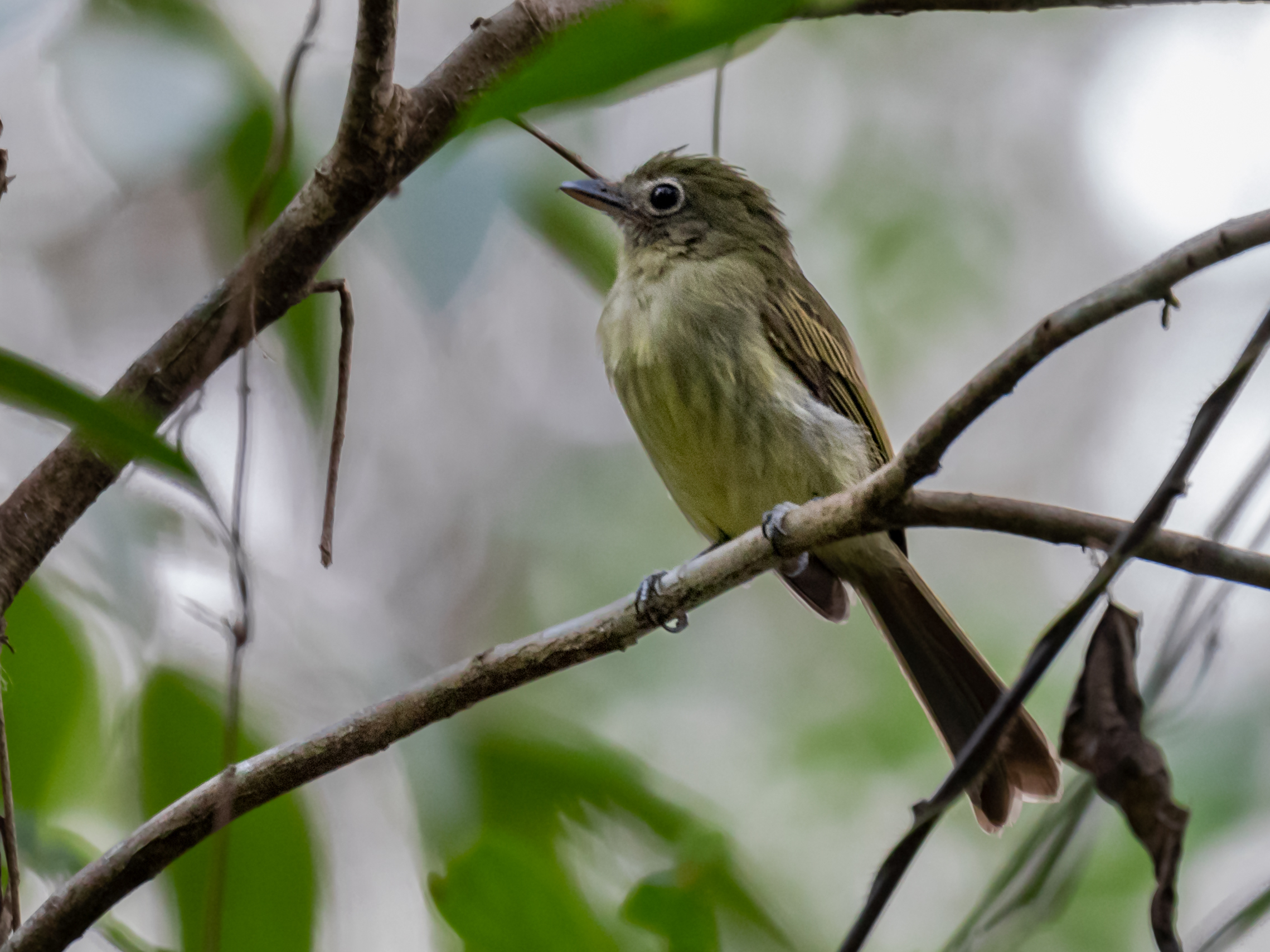

Conservation status
- Least Concern (IUCN 3.1)

Scientific classification
- Kingdom: Animalia
- Phylum: Chordata
- Class: Aves
- Order: Passeriformes
- Family: Tyrannidae
- Genus: Rhynchocyclus
- Species: R. aequinoctialis

Binomial name
- Rhynchocyclus aequinoctialis (Sclater, 1858)

= Western olivaceous flatbill =

Species of bird

The western olivaceous flatbill (Rhynchocyclus aequinoctialis) is a species of bird in the family Tyrannidae, the tyrant flycatchers. It is found in Bolivia, Brazil, Colombia, Ecuador, Panama, Peru, and Venezuela.

== Taxonomy and systematics ==
The western olivaceous flatbill was originally described in 1858 as Cyclorhynchus aequinoctialis. The author noted its resemblance to C. olivaceous, which later became the "olivaceous flatbill" (Rhynchocyclus olivaceous). What is now the western olivaceous flatbill was long treated as a subspecies of that olivaceous flatbill. Following a paper published in 2016 several taxonomic systems split the olivaceous flatbill into western and eastern species though some took until 2023 to do so. By the principle of priority the eastern retained the binomial Rhynchocyclus olivaceous. However, as of early 2025 the North and South American Classification Committees of the American Ornithological Society retain the unsplit olivaceous flatbill, though based on a 2021 publication the South American committee is seeking a proposal to split it into as many as four species.

According to the International Ornithological Committee and the Clements taxonomy, the western olivaceous flatbill has these seven subspecies:

- R. a. bardus (Bangs & Barbour, 1922)
- R. a. mirus Meyer de Schauensee, 1950
- R. a. flavus (Chapman, 1914)
- R. a. jelambianus Aveledo & Peréz, 1994
- R. a. tamborensis Todd, 1952
- R. a. aequinoctialis (Sclater, 1858)
- R. a. cryptus Simões, Cerqueira, Peloso & Aleixo, 2021

As of early 2025 BirdLife International's Handbook of the Birds of the World did not recognize R. a. cryptus. The other two systems recognized it as a subspecies at the time of the split, though the original authors described it as a full species.

This article follows the seven-subspecies model.

== Description ==
The western olivaceous flatbill is 13.5 to 15 cm (5.3 to 5.9 in) long and weighs 14 to 24.5 g (0.49 to 0.86 oz). The sexes have the same plumage. Adults of the nominate subspecies R. a. aequinoctialis have a dark olive head with a somewhat indistinct white eye-ring. Their entire upperparts are dark olive. Their wings are dusky with yellowish edges on the wing coverts and secondaries that form two dull wing bars. Their tertials have buffy to yellow edges. Their tail is a dusky with paler outer edges on the feathers. Their throat is pale gray to pale yellow, their breast grayish olive, and their belly, flanks, and vent are pale yellow. The breast and flanks have olive streaks. Juveniles have duller olive upperparts, paler yellow underparts, and more ochraceous olive uppertail coverts than adults. With the exception of R. a. flavus the other subspecies have essentially the same plumage as the nominate. R. a. flavus has greener upperparts and yellower underparts than the nominate. All subspecies have a brown to black iris, a wide flat bill with black maxilla and a pale horn, yellow, pinkish, or buffy white mandible, and blue-gray legs and feet.

== Distribution and habitat ==
The western olivaceous flatbill has a disjunct distribution. The subspecies are found thus:

- R. a. bardus: Panama from Colón Province on the Caribbean slope and the Canal Zone on the Pacific side east into northwestern Colombia from northern Chocó Department east to southern Bolívar Department
- R. a. mirus: northwestern Colombia in the lower watershed of the Atrato River and vicinity
- R. a. flavus: from Magdalena Department south to western Meta Department in northern and central Colombia and east into northern Venezuela to Aragua in the north and western Apure further south
- R. a. jelambianus: northeastern Venezuela on Paria Peninsula in Sucre state and along the Caripe River in northern Monagas state
- R. a. tamborensis: along the Lebrija River in central Colombia's Santander Department
- R. a. aequinoctialis: from Meta in south-central Colombia south through eastern Ecuador and eastern Peru into northern Bolivia
- R. a. cryptus: from Amazonian eastern Peru and northern Bolivia east into western Brazil south of the Amazon to the Madeira River

The western olivaceous flatbill inhabits humid primary and mature secondary terra firme forest and also várzea forest. In all forest types it favors the understory to mid-story. In elevation it reaches 500 m (1,600 ft) in Panama, 1,000 m (3,300 ft) in Venezuela, 1,400 m (4,600 ft) in Colombia, 700 m (2,300 ft) in Ecuador, 1,100 m (3,600 ft) in Peru, and 500 m (1,600 ft) in Brazil.

== Behavior ==
=== Movement ===
The western olivaceous flatbill is believed to be a year-round resident.

=== Feeding ===
The western olivaceous flatbill feeds on insects, though details are lacking. It typically forages singly or in pairs and often joins mixed-species feeding flocks. It tends to be sluggish, peering slowly around and up from a perch in the understory. It captures prey in the understory to mid-story, using outward or upward sallies to snatch it from leaves and twigs. It occasionally takes prey in mid-air. It typically lands on a different perch after a sally.

=== Breeding ===
The western olivaceous flatbill's breeding season varies geographically. It includes April to June in Panama, February in Venezuela, February to June in Colombia, and October in Peru. Its nest is a bulky, ragged, pear-shaped mass with a tunnel entrance that slopes up to near the bottom of the nest. It is made from plant fibers and dead leaves and is suspended between 2 and 7 m (7 and 23 ft) above the ground. The clutch is two or three eggs that are white with mauve blotches. The incubation period, time to fledging, and details of parental care are not known.

=== Vocalization ===
Researchers have identified three vocalizations of the western olivaceous flatbill. Its song is a "series of typically 5-10 whistles, initially flat and buzzy, gradually shifting to louder purer whistles which accelerate and rise in pitch" and which sometimes are followed by a series of stutters. Its "trill" is a "very short hoarse trill or rough chatter, similar to those that may terminate song, skreeek!". (Subspecies R. a. flavus "utters a more buzzy softer and higher-pitched trill".) Its "wheezy call" is made while excited or interacting with other birds. It resembles a combination of the other two vocalizations "with faint high-pitched wheezy overslurred notes".

== Status ==
The IUCN has assessed the western olivaceous flatbill as being of Least Concern. It has a large range; its population size is not known and is believed to be decreasing. No immediate threats have been identified. It is considered uncommon in much of its range. It occurs in many protected areas, "[t]olerates converted habitats, and [is] not likely to be at any risk in immediate future".
