= Pueblo Rico, Risaralda =

Coordinates: 5°15′N 76°10′W

- Municipality and town
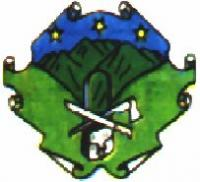
- Flag Coat of arms

- Location of the municipality and town of Pueblo Rico, Risaralda in the Risaralda Department of Colombia.
- Country: Colombia
- Department: Risaralda Department

Area
  - Total: 561 km^{2} (217 sq mi)
- Elevation: 1,560 m (5,120 ft)

Population (2023)
  - Total: 12,423
  - Density: 22.1/km^{2} (57.4/sq mi)
- Time zone: UTC-5 (Colombia Standard Time)

Pueblo Rico is a town and municipality in the Department of Risaralda, Colombia. About 97 km away from the capital Pereira. In 2023 the town had an estimated population of 12,423.

== History ==
Founded in 1904 by Hilarión Pinzón, Leandro Tamayo, Justo Grajales, Sinforoso Leyva, Bibiano Chalarca, José Terán, Luis Ángel and Segundo Ramos. In 1884 by a group of Antioqueños, from Carmen del Atrato, Chocó and it was officially founded in the year 1907. It belonged to Chocó until 1912, when it was annexed to Caldas through Law 31.

In 1925, the construction of the Cintó penal colony began, on the left bank of the San Juan River, which is now closed. Around it, in 1953, the town of Santa Cecilia emerged, which was declared a township that same year. By that time, the first Chocoan families had already reached this place. In 1940, the township of Villa Claret was established, a small hamlet formed northeast of the municipal seat. With these three population centers the Municipality of Pueblo Rico is created.

== Climate ==
Pueblo Rico has a subtropical highland climate with an average annual temperature of 20°C.

Climate data for Pueblo Rico, elevation 1,530 m (5,020 ft), (1981–2010)
Month	Jan	Feb	Mar	Apr	May	Jun	Jul	Aug	Sep	Oct	Nov	Dec	Year
Mean daily maximum °C (°F)	22.0 (71.6)	22.1 (71.8)	22.4 (72.3)	22.5 (72.5)	22.7 (72.9)	22.5 (72.5)	22.4 (72.3)	22.5 (72.5)	22.3 (72.1)	22.0 (71.6)	21.9 (71.4)	21.9 (71.4)	22.3 (72.1)
Daily mean °C (°F)	18.3 (64.9)	18.3 (64.9)	18.5 (65.3)	18.7 (65.7)	18.8 (65.8)	18.7 (65.7)	18.6 (65.5)	18.5 (65.3)	18.5 (65.3)	18.3 (64.9)	18.1 (64.6)	18.2 (64.8)	18.4 (65.1)
Mean daily minimum °C (°F)	16.0 (60.8)	16.1 (61.0)	16.2 (61.2)	16.6 (61.9)	16.5 (61.7)	16.2 (61.2)	15.9 (60.6)	15.8 (60.4)	15.8 (60.4)	15.7 (60.3)	15.8 (60.4)	15.9 (60.6)	16.0 (60.8)
Average precipitation mm (inches)	134.3 (5.29)	122.8 (4.83)	146.0 (5.75)	217.8 (8.57)	205.9 (8.11)	194.7 (7.67)	170.7 (6.72)	160.7 (6.33)	190.9 (7.52)	257.9 (10.15)	298.4 (11.75)	184.3 (7.26)	2,284.2 (89.93)
Average precipitation days	17	16	18	22	24	22	21	21	20	23	24	19	240
Average relative humidity (%)	92	92	91	92	92	92	91	91	92	92	93	92	92
Mean monthly sunshine hours	127.1	104.5	96.1	87.0	99.2	105.0	127.1	127.1	90.0	96.1	108.0	117.8	1,285
Mean daily sunshine hours	4.1	3.7	3.1	2.9	3.2	3.5	4.1	4.1	3.0	3.1	3.6	3.8	3.5
Source: Instituto de Hidrologia Meteorologia y Estudios Ambientales
