= Risaralda Department =

Department of Colombia

Risaralda Department Departamento del Risaralda
- Department
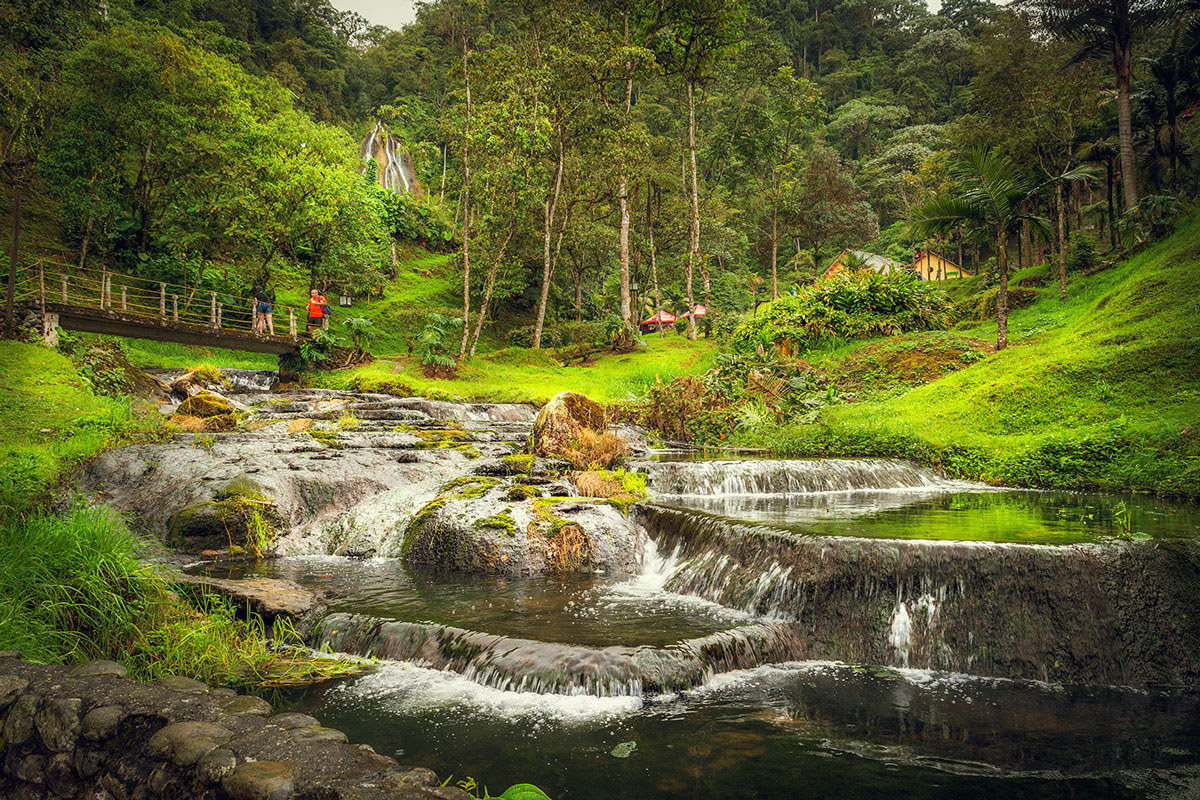
- Hot Springs of Santa Rosa de Cabal

- Flag Coat of arms
- Motto: "La patria de Risaralda"
- Risaralda shown in red

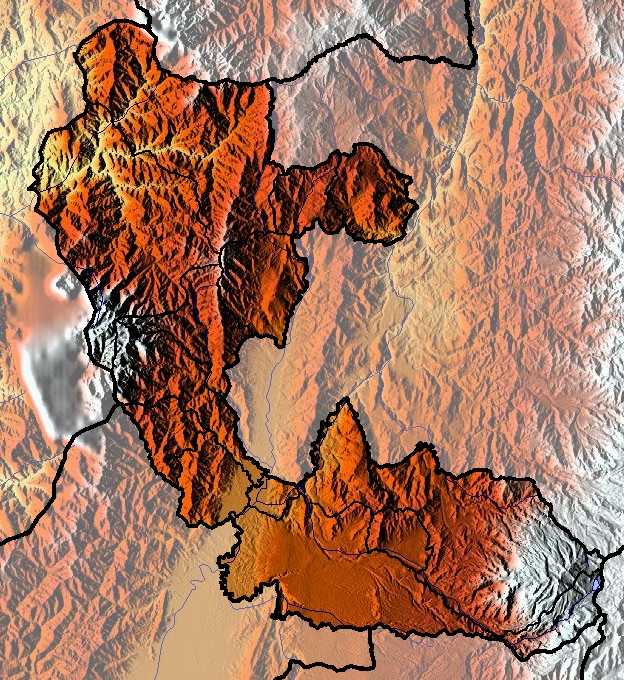
- Topography of the department
- Coordinates: 4°49′N 75°42′W
- Country: Colombia
- Region: Andean Region
- Established: July 1, 1966
- Capital: Pereira

Government
  - Governor: Juan Diego Patiño Ochoa (2024–2027)

Area
  - Total: 4,140 km^{2} (1,600 sq mi)
  - Rank: 29th

Population (2024)
  - Total: 988,091
  - Rank: 18th
  - Density: 239/km^{2} (618/sq mi)

GDP
  - Total: COP 23,786 billion (US$ 5.6 billion)
- Time zone: UTC-05
- ISO 3166 code: CO-RIS
- Municipalities: 14
- HDI: 0.781 high · 11th of 33
- Website: www.risaralda.gov.co

Risaralda (Spanish pronunciation: [risaˈɾalda]) is a department of Colombia. It is located in the western central of the country, in the Andean region, It is part of the Coffee axis with Caldas and Quindío. Its capital is Pereira. Risaralda is very well known for the high quality of its coffee, and a booming industry: automotive, clothes, food, trading of goods and services.

It was divided from the department of Caldas in 1966. The territory is very mountainous and has many kinds of climates in a very small area. Its proximity to harbours such as Buenaventura on the Pacific Region and to the biggest cities in Colombia – Bogotá, Cali, Medellín – makes it a fast-growing economic centre.

== Geography ==
Risaralda department with an area of 4,140 km^{2} (1,600 sq mi), is located in the central sector of the central Andean region west of the country between two major poles of economic development (department of Antioquia in northern and southern Cauca Valley, extending between the central and western Cordillera), which slopes down toward the Río Cauca, also borders the departments of Caldas in the north-east, east Tolima, Quindio Chocó south and west.

The department's drainage system consists of two major basins, the Cauca River and the San Juan River. Physiographical formations are covered by the volcanic massifs of the central and western mountain ranges, flat and narrow valleys formed by the natural river basins of the Otún River, the Cauca River, Risaralda River, and La Vieja River.

Its main stages are: Nevado de Santa Isabel (Pereira), Cerro de Tatamá (Sanctuary), Cerro de Caramanta (Mistrató), Alto de las Palomas (Pueblo Rico), Alto de Pelahuevos (APIA), Blade la Serna (Mistrató), San Juan Blade (APIA), Blade of the Content (APIA), Blade Tribune (Pereira), Alto del Nudo and Morro Azul (Pereira), Alto de la Campana (APIA) and the Crystalline High (Belen de Umbria.)

The soils of the department have their origin in igneous rocks and volcanic ash derived from sedimentary rocks and alluvial and colluvial materials. According to these materials, located in the county soil units: manila, Parnaz or 200, unit 10 or Chinchiná and Malabar, being the most extensive in the coffee or Chinchiná unit 10.

As for the classification agrological (crops) 6.4% of the departmental area (except the municipalities of Pueblo Rico, Belén de Umbria Mistrató and have not agrological study) corresponds to classes II, III, and IV, 77.2% to class V, VI, VII, and 16.4% to class VIII and in appearance agrological mainly found Mj units and Fn., which occupy 58.6% of the total area considered suitable for a variety of crops and forests.

In the department there are a variety of life zones, which are distributed as follows: BMH-PM (40.3%), BMH-MB (28.7%), BP-pm (9.4%) and the rest (21.5%) are bs -T-T bh, bh-T, bh-PM, bp-MB, BH-F, bp-M, among others.

== History ==
Historical population
Year	Pop.	±%
1973	455,667	—
1985	652,872	+43.3%
1993	844,184	+29.3%
2005	897,509	+6.3%
2018	943,401	+5.1%

Before the European conquest the territory was inhabited by the Quimbaya and Caramanta people. The first conquistadores arrived in the 1537 expedition headed by Sebastián de Belalcázar.

Some Spanish towns were founded, but the decline of the indigenous population and low immigration of Europeans led to Risaralda sitting largely abandoned until the mid-nineteenth century, when coffee cultivation arrived.

During the colonial and early years of the Republic, the region was subject to Popayán Province. In 1821 it became part of the Cauca Department. In 1857 it became part of the Federal State of Cauca. In 1905, Risaralda was attached to the Caldas Department. In 1966 it was created as a separate department with its capital in Pereira.

== Municipalities ==
1. Apía
2. Balboa
3. Belén de Umbría
4. Dosquebradas
5. Guática
6. La Celia
7. La Virginia
8. Marsella
9. Mistrató
10. Pereira
11. Pueblo Rico
12. Quinchía
13. Santa Rosa de Cabal
14. Santuario
