= List of bird species described in the 2020s =

This list shall only include newly recognized species and subspecies of birds (living as well as extinct) whose formal description was first published during the period from 1 Jan 2020 to 31 Dec 2029. By default, the table was sorted by the "publ-date" and alphabetically by the scientific name.

== List of species ==
Legend to the BGR column

AF Afrotropical AN Antarctic AU Australasian IM Indomalayan NA Nearctic NT Neotropical OC Oceanian PA Palearctic

publ-date (Note: The date of the first publication of the scientific source in which the species/subspecies was first described. The odd and even years highlighted by different colors.)	VS (Note: The vital status of the taxon on the publ-date: living (Lv) or extinct (Ex).)	Order	Family	Scientific name (Note: In this column, the living species highlighted by yellow (#F9F5B0) and the extinct species highlighted by beige (#CABEB8); the subspecies stay unhighlighted.)	Common name	BGR	Coordinates (Note: The geographic coordinates of the place where the holotype was collected.)	Location (Note: Description of the location where the holotype was collected.)	coll-date (Note: The date on which the holotype was collected.)	NCBI ID	Avibase ID
10 January 2020	Lv	Passeriformes	Muscicapidae	Cyornis omissus omississimus	Togian jungle-flycatcher	AU	00°26.042′S 121°51.357′E	Lowland forest (~150 m asl) near the village of Tanimpo on the island of Batudaka in the Togian Archipelago, Central Sulawesi, Indonesia.	26 December 2013		98AC82D7
10 January 2020	Lv	Passeriformes	Muscicapidae	Ficedula hyperythra betinabiru	Taliabu snowy-browed flycatcher	AU	01°47.614′S 124°48.216′E	Montane forest (~1200 m asl) above the village of Wahe on the island of Taliabu in the Sula Archipelago, North Maluku, Indonesia.	10 December 2013		A7BBC7E7
10 January 2020	Lv	Passeriformes	Locustellidae	Locustella portenta	Taliabu bush warbler	AU	01°47.614′S 124°48.216′E	Montane forest (~1200 m asl) above the village of Wahe on the island of Taliabu in the Sula Archipelago, North Maluku, Indonesia.	13 December 2013		07B21B75
10 January 2020	Lv	Passeriformes	Meliphagidae	Myzomela wahe	Taliabu myzomela	AU	01°47.614′S 124°48.216′E	Montane forest (~1200 m asl) above the village of Wahe on the island of Taliabu in the Sula Archipelago, North Maluku, Indonesia.	9 December 2013		ED10A266
10 January 2020	Lv	Passeriformes	Cettiidae	Phyllergates cucullatus relictus	Banggai mountain leaftoiler	AU	01°17.561′S 122°52.520′E	Montane forest (~950 m asl) above the village of Kokolomboi on the island of Peleng in the Banggai Archipelago, Central Sulawesi, Indonesia.	20 December 2013		ADE06D01
10 January 2020	Lv	Passeriformes	Cettiidae	Phyllergates cucullatus sulanus	Sula mountain leaftoiler	AU	01°47.614′S 124°48.216′E	Montane forest (~1200 m asl) above the village of Wahe on the island of Taliabu in the Sula Archipelago, North Maluku, Indonesia.	11 December 2013		2DC9D6EE
10 January 2020	Lv	Passeriformes	Phylloscopidae	Phylloscopus poliocephalus emilsalimi	Taliabu leaf-warbler	AU	01°47.614′S 124°48.216′E	Montane forest (~1200 m asl) above the village of Wahe on the island of Taliabu in the Sula Archipelago, North Maluku, Indonesia.	9 December 2013		90C6C0C9
10 January 2020	Lv	Passeriformes	Phylloscopidae	Phylloscopus poliocephalus suaramerdu	Peleng leaf-warbler	AU	01°17.561′S 122°52.520′E	Montane forest (~950 m asl) above the village of Kokolomboi on the island of Peleng in the Banggai Archipelago, Central Sulawesi, Indonesia.	20 December 2013		362F86E4
10 January 2020	Lv	Passeriformes	Rhipiduridae	Rhipidura habibiei	Peleng fantail	AU	01°17.561′S 122°52.520′E	Montane forest (~850 m asl) above the village of Kokolomboi on the island of Peleng in the Banggai Archipelago, Central Sulawesi, Indonesia.	22 December 2013		F36F6683
10 January 2020	Lv	Passeriformes	Turdidae	Turdus deningeri sukahujan	Taliabu island thrush	AU	01°47.614′S 124°48.216′E	Montane forest (~1200 m asl) above the village of Wahe on the island of Taliabu in the Sula Archipelago, North Maluku, Indonesia.	10 December 2013		BCB8D17C
21 February 2020	Lv	Passeriformes	Rhinocryptidae	Scytalopus frankeae	Jalca tapaculo	NT	9°53′38″S 75°44′49″W	Mountain trail (~ 3675 m als) from Pozuzo to Chaglla, Huánuco, Peru.	26 July 1985	2723210	25B56CA4
21 February 2020	Lv	Passeriformes	Rhinocryptidae	Scytalopus krabbei	White-winged tapaculo	NT	5°43′23″S 77°45′14″W	Humid temperate shrub forest (~2975 m asl) on east slope of Cerro Patricia, Bosque de Proteccion Alto Mayo, San Martín, Peru.	29 June 2002	2763109	9258D9BB
21 February 2020	Lv	Passeriformes	Rhinocryptidae	Scytalopus whitneyi	Ampay tapaculo	NT	13°31′05″S 72°53′17″W	Mountain area (~3500 m asl) north-northeast of Abancay , Apurímac, Peru.	18 March 1987		7E2D54EB
28 February 2020	Ex			Khinganornis hulunbuirensis		PA	48°39′52″S 123°52′22″E	Lower Cretaceous Longjiang Formation (121.23 ± 0.74 Ma), Morin Dawa Daur Autonomous Banner, Hulunbuir City, Inner Mongolia Autonomous Region, China.			B6F65F2A
18 March 2020	Ex			Asteriornis maastrichtensis		PA	50°47′18″S 5°40′26″E	Valkenburg Member (66.8–66.7 Ma) of Late Cretaceous (Maastrichtian) Maastricht Formation at the Romontbos Quarry, near Eben-Emael, Liège, Belgium.			C138B6A5
24 March 2020	Lv	Passeriformes	Pycnonotidae	Alophoixus ruficrissus meratusensis	Penan bulbul (meratusensis)	IM	2°43′30″S 115°35′21″E	Montane forest around the summit trail (~1150 m asl) to the Mount Besar in the Meratus Mountains, located in the SE part of the island of Borneo,~35 km E of the town of Kandangan, South Hulu Sungai, South Kalimantan, Indonesia.	8 May 2017		B39EC766
31 March 2020	Ex	Pterocliformes	Pteroclidae	Linxiavis inaquosus		PA	35°25′03″N 103°35′01″E	Hipparion fauna beds (~6–9 Ma) of the Late Miocene Liushu Formation, near the village of Baiwang, Linxia, Gansu, China.			18964BBD
12 May 2020	Lv	Passeriformes	Cacatuidae	Calyptorhynchus banksii escondidus	Red-tailed black cockatoo (escondidus)	AU	29°03′S 116°06′E	Arid zone 13 miles NE of the town of Morawa, Western Australia, Australia.	11 July 1978		CA47424F
22 June 2020	Lv	Passeriformes	Maluridae	Amytornis oweni aenigma	Sandhill grasswren (aenigma)	AU	31°41′S 133°44′E	Semi-arid low mallee woodland of the southern Yellabinna, 50 km north of Ceduna, Eyre Peninsula, South Australia, Australia.	21 August 1983		878160D6
22 June 2020	Lv	Passeriformes	Maluridae	Amytornis whitei parvus	Pilbara grasswren (parvus)	AU	22°23′S 113°54′E	Cape Range, Western Australia,Australia.	21 May 1900		F35AE142
21 July 2020	Lv	Passeriformes	Grallariidae	Grallaria alvarezi	Chami antpitta	NT	05°09′29″S 76°01′00″W	Upper montane wet forest (~2650 m asl) on the Western Andes, PNN Tatamá, Pueblo Rico, Risaralda, Colombia.	23 August 2004		4248B7F6
21 July 2020	Lv	Passeriformes	Grallariidae	Grallaria ayacuchensis	Ayacucho antpitta	NT	13°16′S 73°30′W	Chusquea thicket in secondary forest (~3300 m asl), near the village of Chupón, La Mar, Ayacucho, Peru.	22 September 2012		2A3E14B1
21 July 2020	Lv	Passeriformes	Grallariidae	Grallaria centralis	Oxapampa antpitta	NT	11°31′S 74°52′W	Secondary forest along the Satipo River (2400 m asl), above the locality of Calabaza, Junín, Peru.	4 October 2008		53392BEC
21 July 2020	Lv	Passeriformes	Grallariidae	Grallaria gravesi	Chachapoyas antpitta	NT	07°32′S 77°28′W	Isolated patch of temperate forest (~3250 m asl) near Puerto del Monte on the left bank of the Jelache River, ~15 km NW of Gran Pajatén, Mariscal Cáceres, San Martín, Peru.	5 August 1981		592F3341
21 July 2020	Lv	Passeriformes	Grallariidae	Grallaria occabambae marcapatensis	Urubamba antpitta (maastrichtensis)	NT	13°30′S 70°55′W	Mountain trail (~2750 m asl) about 10 km NE of the town of Marcapata, Quispicanchi, Cuzco, Peru.	26 July 1953		879F1AED
21 July 2020	Lv	Passeriformes	Grallariidae	Grallaria oneilli	Panao antpitta	NT	09°59′S 76°05′W	Timberline near Bosque Potrero (~3345 m asl), ~14 km S of the town of Panao, Pachitea, Huánuco, Peru.	21 June 1983		97A8C8BF
21 July 2020	Lv	Passeriformes	Grallariidae	Grallaria sinaensis	Puno antpitta	NT	14°29′S 69°17′W	Near the village of Sina (~3100 m asl), San Antonio de Putina, Puno, Peru.	15 October 2009		B1B6891A
12 August 2020	Ex	Sphenisciformes	Spheniscidae	Eudyptes atatu		AU	39°35′S 174°12′E	Waipipian marine horizon (3.36–3.06 Ma) of Late Pliocene (Piacenzian) Tangahoe Formation in the southern Taranaki region, North Island, New Zealand.			49129740
14 August 2020	Ex	Strigiformes	Tytonidae	Tyto maniola	Cuban dwarf barn owl	NT	22°57′N 80°58′W	Late Pleistocene formation (41–22±2,6 ka) at Las Breas de San Felipe (San Felipe II), San Felipe Valley, ~5.5 km W of the town of Martí, Matanzas, Cuba.	28 November 1998		C4AFD569
2 October 2020	Lv	Charadriiformes	Scolopacidae	Limosa limosa bohaii	Black-tailed godwit (bohaii)	PA	39°06′N 117°48′E	Northern shore of the Bohai Bay at Hangu, Tianjin, China.	16 April 2018	2830701	0AAE0403
5 November 2020	Lv	Sphenisciformes	Spheniscidae	Pygoscelis papua poncetii	Gentoo penguin (poncetii)	NT	54°24′S 36°42′W	South Georgia Island in the South Atlantic Ocean, British Overseas Territories.	11 March 1913		2F6DCCD0
13 November 2020	Lv	Passeriformes	Alaudidae	Calandrella cinerea rufipecta	Red-capped lark (rufipecta)	AF	09°53′N 08°56′E	Grassland near the village of Gwafan, Plateau State, Nigeria.	31 January 2006		BAC96C31
15 November 2020	Ex	Passeriformes	Corvidae	Corvus bragai		AF	26°00′41″S 27°45′00″E	Member 2 of the hominin-bearing site of Kromdraai (2.0–1.6 Ma) in the Cradle of Humankind, near the town of Krugersdorp, Gauteng, South Africa.			50D29E22
15 November 2020	Ex	Strigiformes	Strigidae	Glaucidium ireneae		AF	26°00′41″S 27°45′00″E	Member 2 of the hominin-bearing site of Kromdraai (2.0–1.6 Ma) in the Cradle of Humankind, near the town of Krugersdorp, Gauteng, South Africa.			BD2567D4
20 November 2020	Lv	Procellariiformes	Procellariidae	Puffinus puffinus canariensis	Manx shearwater (canariensis)	PA	28°23′24″N 16°31′25″W	Near the town of La Orotava on the island of Tenerife, Canary Islands, Spain.	6 March 2009		3009BCF0
27 January 2021	Ex	Piciformes	Picidae	Bitumenpicus minimus		NA	34°03′50″N 118°21′25″W	Pit A of Bliss 29 of the Late Pleistocene La Brea Tar Pits (300–12 ka), Rancho La Brea, Los Angeles, California, US			77573A24
27 January 2021	Ex	Piciformes	Picidae	Breacopus garretti		NA	34°03′50″N 118°21′25″W	Pit 16 of the Late Pleistocene La Brea Tar Pits (300-12 ka), Rancho La Brea, Los Angeles, California, US			FF096506
27 January 2021	Ex	Piciformes	Picidae	Melanerpes shawi		NA	34°03′50″N 118°21′25″W	Pit A of Bliss 29 of the Late Pleistocene La Brea Tar Pits (300-12 ka), Rancho La Brea, Los Angeles, California, US			317B0BB0
29 January 2021	Ex	Procellariiformes	Procellariidae	Procellaria altirostris		AU	39°35′S 174°12′E	Waipipian marine horizon (3.36–3.06 Ma) of Late Pliocene (Piacenzian) Tangahoe Formation in the southern Taranaki region, North Island, New Zealand.	2015		0898B926
6 March 2021	Lv	Trogoniformes	Trogonidae	Trogon chrysochloros muriciensis	Alagoas black-throated trogon.	NT	12°46′S 52°37′W	Montane forest (583 m asl) of the Estação Ecológica de Murici, Alagoas, Brazil.	19 September 1983		379A366E
26 March 2021	Lv	Strigiformes	Strigidae	Megascops alagoensis	Alagoas screech-owl	NT	8°58′56″S 35°51′52″W	Forest patch near the town of Ibateguara, Alagoas, Brazil.	February 2003	2803252	781B73E4
26 March 2021	Lv	Strigiformes	Strigidae	Megascops stangiae	Xingu screech-owl	NT	05°46′12″S 50°29′55″W	Forest edge near the Salobo Mine in the Carajás Mountains, ~12 km N of the hamlet of Caldeirão, Parauapebas, Pará, Brazil.	4 August 2010	2803253	13B45F6C
6 April 2021	Lv	Passeriformes	Cisticolidae	Prinia gracilis ashi	Graceful prinia (ashi)	AF	02°12′N 45°37′E	Narrow belt of coastal saltbush plants, located near the locality of Mallable, ~30 km NE of Mogadishu, Somalia.	16 February 1979		A0892297
23 April 2021	Ex	Apterygiformes	Apterygidae	Apteryx littoralis		AU	40°00′16.8″S 175°21′54.2″E	Lower Castlecliffian horizon (~1 Ma) in the Kaimatira Pumice Sand Formation (part of the Potaka Tephra), 'Morrison's Farm Gully', ~7 km N of the town of Marton, Manawatū-Whanganui, North Island, New Zealand.			7196A8A5
17 May 2021	Lv	Passeriformes	Cisticolidae	Cisticola anderseni	White-tailed cisticola	AF	08°11′S 36°55′E	Tall grass by Kilombero River (245 m asl), ~25 km SWW of the town of Ifakara, Morogoro Region, Tanzania.	12 November 1961	2867387	69045C0B
17 May 2021	Lv	Passeriformes	Cisticolidae	Cisticola bakerorum	Kilombero cisticola	AF	08°11′S 36°55′E	Tall grass by Kilombero River (245 m asl), ~25 km SW of the town of Ifakara, Morogoro Region, Tanzania.	12 November 1961	2867388	43B615B3
11 June 2021	Lv	Passeriformes	Melanocharitidae	Melanocharis citreola	Satin berrypecker	AU	4°00′41″S 133°05′15″W	Mid-montane cloud forest (~1191 m asl) on the Kumawa Mountains in the E part of the Bomberai Peninsula, West Papua, Indonesia.	17 November 2014	2794625	756BA63D
4 July 2021	Ex			Kaririavis mater		NT	07°07′25″S 39°42′07″W	Early Cretaceous Crato Formation (~115–113 Ma) at the Pedra Branca Mine, located ~2 km SW of the town of Nova Olinda, Ceará, Brazil.			652BEFCF
1 October 2021	Lv	Passeriformes	Thraupidae	Heliothraupis oneilli	Inti tanager	NT	14°26′S 68°32′W	Semi-deciduous woodland (~960 m asl) in the NE part of Andean Plateau, ANMI Madidi, ~33 km NW of the town of Apolo, Franz Tamayo], La Paz, Bolivia.	27 January 2019	2871835	543A1887
16 October 2021	Lv	Charadriiformes	Scolopacidae	Limosa lapponica yamalensis	Bar-tailed godwit (yamalensis)	PA	67°29′N 68°13′E	Boggy tundra near the Yunyakha River's mouth, Shchuchya River Valley, ~31 NW of the village of Shchuchye, Priuralsky District, YNAO, Russia.	21 June 1998	2984187	461F5238
21 October 2021	Lv	Passeriformes	Passerellidae	Chlorospingus semifuscus xanthothorax	Dusky chlorospingus (xanthothorax)	NT	03°39′07.32″S 79°44′36.32″W	Cloud forest (969 m asl) at the Buenaventura Reserve in the S part of the Tumbes–Chocó–Magdalena biodiversity hotspot, ~3 km N of the village of Moromoro, Piñas, El Oro, SW Ecuador.	8 September 2017		D0749E11
28 October 2021	Lv	Passeriformes	Turdidae	Turdus grayi suarezi	Clay-colored thrush (suarezi)	NT	06°28′N 75°46′W	Tropical dry forest in the middle canyon of the Cauca River (~550 m asl), ~4.2 km NW of the town of San Jerónimo, Antioquia, Colombia.	26 June 2012		921747A1
10 November 2021	Lv	Passeriformes	Tyrannidae	Rhynchocyclus aequinoctialis cryptus	Western olivaceous flatbill (cryptus)	NT	11°03′05″S 70°12′59″W	Seasonal floodplain forest (várzea) at the Rio Acre Ecological Station ~70 W of the town Assis Brasil, Acre, Brazil.	14 August 2005		65E32F80
20 December 2021	Ex	Gruiformes	Rallidae	Gallirallus astolfoi	Astolfo's rail	OC	27°36′25″S 144°22′46″W	Section S1 of the Holocene formation (10→ ka) in the Tangarutu Cave on the island of Rapa in the South Pacific Ocean, French Polynesia.	21 July 2002		921C75C0
11 January 2022	Lv	Passeriformes	Muscicapidae	Cyornis kadayangensis	Meratus blue flycatcher	IM	2°43′30″S 115°35′11″E	Montane forest around the summit trail (~1150 m asl) to the Mount Besar in the Meratus Mountains, located in the SE part of the island of Borneo,~35 km E of the town of Kandangan, South Hulu Sungai, South Kalimantan, Indonesia.	8 May 2017		69456178
11 January 2022	Lv	Passeriformes	Zosteropidae	Zosterops meratusensis	Meratus white-eye	IM	2°43′22″S 115°35′35″E	Montane forest around the summit trail (~1350 m asl) to the Mount Besar in the Meratus Mountains, located in the SE part of the island of Borneo,~35 km E of the town of Kandangan, South Hulu Sungai, South Kalimantan, Indonesia.	14 May 2017		A8E088F0
1 February 2022	Lv	Psittaciformes	Psittacidae	Poicephalus rueppellii mariettae	Rüppell's parrot (mariettae)	AF	22°21′03″S 16°07′36″E	Tree savanna near the settlement of Otjimbingwe, Erongo, Namibia.	4 March 2018		A04F6479
11 March 2022	Ex			Musivavis amabilis		PA	41°36′N 120°23′E	Lower Cretaceous Jiufotang Formation (~120 Ma) at the locality of Shangheshou in the city of Chaoyang, Liaoning, China.			2AB6FE46
28 March 2022	Ex	Strigiformes	Strigidae	Miosurnia diurna		PA	35°30′N 103°36′E	Fossil-bearing sediments (~6.0–9.5 Ma) of the Late Miocene Liushu Formation, Linxia, Gansu, China.			5065EE8C
5 April 2022	Ex	Apodiformes	Aegothelidae	Aegotheles zealandivetus		AU	44°54′29″S 169°51′30″E	Altonian bed HH1b (~19–16 Ma) of the Lower Miocene Bannockburn Formation at the Home Hills Station on the left bank of the Manuherikia River, ~5 km SE of the town of Saint Bathans, Central Otago, South Island, New Zealand.			1E3C24DB
5 April 2022	Ex		Zealandornithidae	Zealandornis relictus		AU	44°54′29″S 169°51′30″E	Altonian bed HH1a (~19–16 Ma) of the Lower Miocene Bannockburn Formation at the Home Hills Station on the left bank of the Manuherikia River, ~5 km SE of the town of Saint Bathans, Central Otago, South Island, New Zealand.			28D06BEF
23 May 2022	Lv	Passeriformes	Muscicapidae	Copsychus malabaricus ngae	Langkawi shama	IM	6°14′04″N 99°48′19″E	Lowland rainforest on the island of Dayang Bunting, located ~2 km off the S shore of the island of Langkawi, Kedah, Malaysia.	9 December 1916	3019657	758F173D
14 July 2022	Ex	Gaviiformes	Gaviidae	Nasidytes ypresianus		PA	51°51′54″N 1°17′20″E	Walton Member (54.6‒55.0 Ma) of the early Eocene London Clay Formation, Walton-on-the-Naze, Essex, UK.	1992		CA20F17A
20 July 2022	Ex	Anseriformes	Anatidae	Notochen bannockburnensis		AU	44°53.37′S 169°50.27′E	Altonian bed Croc Site L1 (~19–16 Ma) of the Lower Miocene Bannockburn Formation at the Mata Creek, located on the right bank of the Manuherikia River, ~2.8 km SE of the town of Saint Bathans, Central Otago, South Island, New Zealand.			BB351119
17 August 2022	Lv	Passeriformes	Rhinocryptidae	Scytalopus superciliaris ambatensis	White-browed tapaculo (ambatensis)	NT	28°14′07″S 66°01′35″W	Rocky grassland (~4300 m asl) around the summit trail to the Mount El Manchao in the Aconquija Mountains, at the locality of Casa de Piedra de Los Cajones, above the village of El Rodeo, Ambato, Catamarca, NW Argentina.	30 October 1985		DBBBFDEE
22 August 2022	Lv	Passeriformes	Furnariidae	Aphrastura spinicauda subantarctica	Thorn-tailed rayadito (subantarctica)	NT	56°31′20″S 68°42′56″W	Tussock grassland on the island of Gonzalo in the Diego Ramírez Archipelago, Magallanes and Antarctic region, Chile.	22 July 2017		0C415001
30 September 2022	Lv	Strigiformes	Tytonidae	Tyto javanica fallens	Alor barn owl	AU	08°17′39″S 124°43′17″E	Patch of rainforest near village of Apui (~1000 m asl) on the island of Alor in the Lesser Sunda Archipelago, East Nusa Tenggara, Indonesia.	25 April 1991		4411F70B
11 October 2022	Lv	Passeriformes	Zosteropidae	Zosterops paruhbesar	Wangi-wangi white-eye	AU	5°18′59″S 123°34′54″E	Forest on the island of Wangi-wangi in the Tukangbesi Archipelago, Southeast Sulawesi, Indonesia.	19 September 2019		EAA91476
30 October 2022	Lv	Passeriformes	Strigidae	Otus bikegila	Principe scops owl	AF	01°33.03′N 07°22.29′E	Rainforest (~100 m als) ~500 m NW the Ribeira Porco River's mouth, located on the E shore of the island of Príncipe in the Gulf of Guinea, São Tomé e Príncipe.	29 May 2017	3045889	C6277A45
14 December 2022	Lv	Passeriformes	Cisticolidae	Orthotomus nigriceps luminosus	Black-headed tailorbird (luminosus)	IM	10°21′05″N 125°36′23″E	Lowland evergreen forest at the locality of Balitbiton, Loreto, Dinagat Islands, Caraga, Philippines.	14 April 1972		4C9237A5
7 December 2022	Lv	Trogoniformes	Trogonidae	Apaloderma vittatum delhoyoi	Bar-tailed trogon (delhoyoi)	AF	0°31′31″N 30°23′34″E	Moist evergreen rainforest (~1500 m asl), located SE of the town of Fort Portal, Tooro Kingdom, SW Uganda.	16 September 1906		EB27E696
30 January 2023	Ex	Procellariiformes	Procellariidae	Macronectes tinae		AU	39°35′S 174°12′E	Waipipian marine horizon (3.36–3.06 Ma) of Late Pliocene (Piacenzian) Tangahoe Formation in the southern Taranaki region, North Island, New Zealand.			19978E43
9 May 2023	Ex	Pelecaniformes	Pelecanidae	Pelecanus paranensis		NT	32°35′51″S 60°11′22″W	Upper sandstone marine beds of the Late Miocene Paraná Formation (11.63–5.33 Ma) in the Cerro La Matanza locality in the city of Victoria, Entre Ríos, Argentina.			CDF1E990
7 June 2023	Lv	Passeriformes	Pycnonotidae	Rubigula dispar matamerah	Ruby-throated bulbul (matamerah)	IM	00°42′S 100°58′E	Wooded area (~270 m als) near the village of Sijunjung, Sawahlunto Sijunjung], West Sumatra, Indonesia.	1 October 1878		2294F38F
7 July 2023	Lv	Passeriformes	Turdidae	Catharus fuscater arcanus	Slaty-backed nightingale-thrush (arcanus)	NT	8°47′45″S 78°27′47″W	Humid montane forest (~1200 m asl) near the summit of the Mount Chucantí in the mountain range of Majé, ~20 km NE of the town of Chimán, Panamá Province, Panama.	16 February 2006	3047110	98D05370
7 July 2023	Lv	Passeriformes	Turdidae	Catharus fuscater nebulus	Slaty-backed nightingale-thrush (nebulus)	NT	6°35′06″S 77°33′42″W	Humid montane forest (~2400 m asl) near the summit of the Mount Monte Alegre, ~11 km SW of village of Limabamba, Rodríguez de Mendoza, Amazonas, Peru.	23 June 2010	3062229	A7CBD9FF
7 July 2023	Lv	Passeriformes	Turdidae	Catharus fuscater tenebris	Slaty-backed nightingale-thrush (tenebris)	NT	4°47′00″S 79°20′00″W	Humid montane forest (~2250 m asl) on the E slope of the mountain range of Lagunillas, N bank of the Isimanchi River, ~6 km NW of the village of San Andrés, Zamora-Chinchipe, S Ecuador.	6 November 1992	3062231	FF988B11
1 August 2023	Ex	Pterocliformes	Pteroclidae	Pterocles bosporanus		PA	45°02′35″N 34°16′58″E	Lower Pleistocene sediments ((1.8–1.5 Ma) in the Taurida Cave, located in the S part of the peninsula of Crimea, near the village of Zuya, Bilohirsk Raion, ARC, Ukraine (de facto Russia).			DAACDC46
7 September 2023	Lv	Passeriformes	Turdidae	Turdus plumbeus perditus	Red-legged thrush (perditus)	NT	17°24′38″N 83°55′19″W	Lowland tropical forest on the Swan Islands in the Caribbean Sea, Bay Islands, Honduras.	4 February 1887		67ABC35F
27 February 2024	Ex			Imparavis attenboroughi		PA	40°56′N 119°57′E	Lower Aptian sediments (~120 Ma) of the Jiufotang Formation, located near the town of Toudaoyingzi, Jianchang County, Liaoning, China.			AE49B755
13 June 2024	Lv	Passeriformes	Thraupidae	Trichothraupis melanops griseonota	Black-goggled tanager (griseonota)	NT	17°27′50″S 63°38′45″W	Bolivian montane dry forest on the E slope of the Andes (~450 m asl), near the town of Buena Vista, Santa Cruz, Bolivia.	30 July 1916		0269BC12
13 June 2024	Lv	Passeriformes	Thamnophilidae	Sakesphoroides cristatus niedeguidonae	Silvery-cheeked antshrike (niedeguidonae)	NT	08°52′47″S 42°43′33″W	Dry tropical forest (caatinga) at biological reserve of Serra Vermelha (~525 m asl), ~12 N of the town of Sao Raimundo Nonato, Piaui, Northeast Region, Brazil.	11 January 2019		415C1264
21 June 2024	Ex	Anseriformes	Anatidae	Chloephaga dabbenei		NT	38°30′00″S 61°46′00″W	Lower Section of the middle Pleistocene San José Sequence (0.78-0.12 Ma) at Bajo de San José, ~50 km NE of the city of Bahía Blanca, Buenos Aires Province, Argentina.			9446257C
24 June 2024	Lv	Caprimulgiformes	Caprimulgidae	Caprimulgus ritae	Timor nightjar	AU	07°48′S 126°18′E	Tropical forest on the island of Wetar in the Maluku Archipelago, Maluku, Indonesia.	7 March 1898		B408927B
9 August 2024	Ex	Psittaciformes	Psittaculidae	Agapornis longipes		AF	26°00′41″S 27°45′00″E	Kromdraai fossil site (2.0–1.6 Ma) in the Cradle of Humankind, near the town of Krugersdorp, Gauteng, South Africa.			C9BDB264
24 September 2024	Ex			Shuilingornis angelai		PA	40°39′37″N 119°41′29″E	Lower Cretaceous (Aptian, ~122–119 Ma) Jiufotang Formation, near the locality of Lamadong, Jianchang, Huludao, Liaoning, E China.			E0797608
17 December 2024	Lv	Passeriformes	Hirundinidae	Tachycineta albiventer magdalenae	White-winged swallow (magdalenae)	NT	10°38′N 75°11′W	Shore of the small lake of Tocaguas (~20 m asl), near the village of San Juan de Tocaguas, Luruaco, Atlántico, N Colombia.	14 January 1947		AE591C7F
17 January 2025	Ex			Novavis pubisculata		PA	39°35′55″N 96°23′38″E	Protopteryx-horizon of the Lower Cretaceous (Late Aptian, ~123–113 Ma) Xiagou Formation in the Changma Basin, located near the town of Changma, Yumen, Jiuquan, Gansu, NW China.	2005		7A2AEB66
12 February 2025	Ex			Baminornis zhenghensis		PA	27°08′39″N 119°00′53″E	Layer 2 of the Late Jurassic (Lower Tithonian, ~149.9–150.2 Ma) Nanyuan Formation, located near the village of Yangyuan, Zhenghe, Fujian, SE China.			70977D59

== See also ==
- List of bird species described in the 2000s
- List of bird species described in the 2010s
- List of living mammal species described in the 2020s
