= Miosurnia =

Miosurnia Temporal range: Miocene, 9.5–6.0 Ma

Scientific classification
- Kingdom: Animalia
- Phylum: Chordata
- Class: Aves
- Order: Strigiformes
- Family: Strigidae
- Clade: Surniini
- Genus: †Miosurnia; Li, Stidham, & Zhou, 2022
- Species: †M. diurna

Binomial name
- †Miosurnia diurna Li, Stidham, & Zhou, 2022

Extinct genus of birds

Miosurnia (meaning "Miocene Surnia") is an extinct genus of owls in the clade Surniini, known from the Late Miocene Liushu Formation of Gansu Province, China. The genus contains a single species, Miosurnia diurna, known from a nearly complete, articulated skeleton.

== Discovery and naming ==
The Miosurnia holotype specimen, STM 20-1, was discovered in a layer of the Liushu Formation in the Linxia Basin of Gansu Province, China. The specimen is articulated and nearly complete, lacking only the right forelimb and left manual digits.

In 2022, Li et al. published a paper analyzing the evolution of diurnalism in owls beginning in the late Miocene, and described Miosurnia diurna, a new genus and species of true owls. The generic name, "Miosurnia", references the Miocene age of the holotype specimen as well as the close relation of the genus to Surnia. The specific name, "diurna", refers to the diurnalism inferred for the animal.

== Description ==
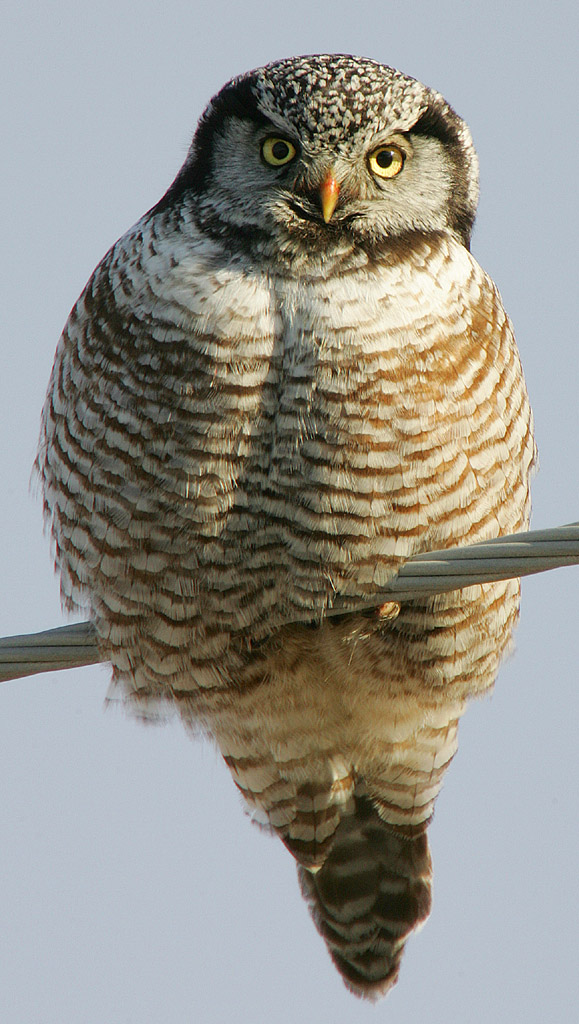
Surnia ulula (northern hawk-owl), an extant close relative of Miosurnia

The describing authors concluded that Miosurnia would have had a body size comparable to the extant strigidaen Surnia ulula (Northern hawk-owl), with an estimated body length (rostrum to pubis) of 30 centimetres (12 in) and body mass of about 236–318 grams (0.520–0.701 lb).

== Classification ==
In their phylogenetic analyses, Li et al. (2022) recovered Miosurnia as a member of the Surniini and sister taxon to Surnia + Glaucidium. All members of this clade are diurnal.

- Surniini
  - †Miosurnia diurna
  - - Surnia ulula
    - - - Glaucidium passerinum
        - Glaucidium sjostedti
      - - Glaucidium gnoma
        - Glaucidium brasilianum

== See also ==
- List of bird species described in the 2020s
