= Liushu Formation =

Geological formation in Gansu, China

- Stratigraphic range: Late Miocene (Tortonian to Messinian); ~11.0–6.4 Ma
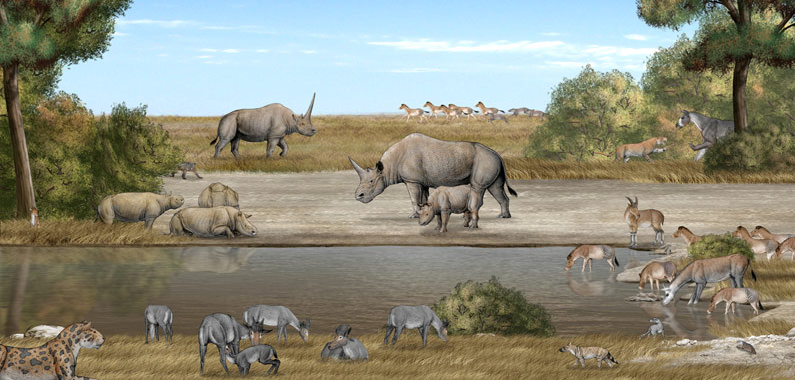
- An artist's illustration of the paleobiota and environment of the upper part of the Liushu Formation
- Type: Geological formation

Lithology
- Primary: Red claystone, Siltstone
- Other: Mudstone

Location
- Coordinates: 35.5°N 103.6°E
- Region: Gansu Province
- Country: China
- Extent: Linxia Basin
- Approximate paleocoordinates: 35.0°N 101.4°E
- Liushu Formation (China) Liushu Formation (Gansu)

The Liushu Formation is a geological formation in Gansu province, China that spans up to 100 m thick and is widely distributed within the Linxia Basin, with a paleomagnetic age between 11 and 6.4 mya (Upper/Late Miocene).

== Geology ==
The formation is divided into three parts representing three different ages, generally referred to as the "upper part" (youngest, at 6-7 mya), the "middle part" (intermediate, at 9 to 7.6 mya, also known as the Dashengou Fauna), and the "lower part" (oldest).

== Paleobiota ==
=== Birds ===
Genus	Species	Locality	Stratigraphic position	Material	Notes	Images
Eopavo	E. hezhengensis			A partial skeleton	A stem relative of peafowl	
Falco	F. hezhengensis	?"Hipparion fauna", Gansu Province		A nearly complete, articulated skeleton	An extinct falcon, classified as a stem kestrel	
Gracilisgallus	G. linxia	Shi-li-dun, Gansu Province	Upper part; borders the lower Hewangjia Formation	A nearly complete, articulated skeleton	An extinct phasianid	
Gansugyps	G. linxiaensis	Yangwapuzijifang, Guanghe County	Upper part	Two articulated skeletons	An extinct aegypiine Old World vulture	
Linxiavis	L. inaquosus	Baiwang, Gansu Province	Middle part–Upper part	Articulated and associated elements of the wings, shoulder girdle, vertebrae, and hind limb	An extinct sandgrouse	
Miosurnia	M. diurna	Linxia Basin of Gansu Province	Upper part	A nearly complete, articulated skeleton, lacking the right forelimb and left manual digits	A diurnal surniin bird in the true owl family	
Mioneophron	M. longirostris	Baihua Village, Zhuangheji Town, Guanghe County	Upper part	A nearly complete, articulated skeleton	An extinct gypaetine Old World vulture	
Panraogallus	P. hezhengensis	Zhuangkeji Township, Gansu Province	Upper part	A nearly complete, articulated skeleton	An extinct phasianid	
Sinoergilornis	S. guangheensis	Langwagou Village, Zhuangkeji Town, Guanghe County	Upper part	A three-dimensionally preserved distal left tarsometatarsus and a nearly complete set of pedal phalanges	An eogruid	
Struthio	S. linxiaensis	Yangwapuzijifang, Guanghe County	Upper part	An incomplete pelvis and synsacrum	An extinct ostrich, also placed in the genus Orientornis	

=== Mammals ===
==== Artiodactyla ====
Genus	Species	County	Stratigraphic position	Material	Notes	Images
Chleuastochoerus	C. linxiaensis	Yangwapuzi, Guanghe County	Upper part	The cranium of a male individual and a juvenile female	A Hyotheriinae suidae.	
Chleuastochoerus	C. stehlini		Middle to Upper part	Cranium skull and mandible	A Hyotheriinae suidae.	
Dicrocerus	D. sp.	Houshan locality, Guanghe County	Middle to Upper part		An ancient deer	
Dorcadoryx	D. sp.	Baihuacun and Langwagou localities	Middle to Upper part.		An early caprini relative	
Eostyloceros	E. hezhengensis	Gaojiashan, Hezheng County	Upper part	An adult skull with its cranial appendages, lacking the muzzle, the left dentition, and the basioccipital part	A large muntjak	
Euprox	E. furcatus		Upper part	An adult skull and pair of near-complete antlers.	The largest known Eupox species ever discovered	
Gazella	G. dorcadoides	Houshan and Baihuacun locality, Guanghe County	Upper part.		Early relatives of gazelles.	
Gazella	G. gaudryi	Houshan and Baihuacun locality, Guanghe County	Middle to Upper part		Early relatives of gazelles.	
Gazella	G. paotehensis	Houshan and Baihuacun locality, Guanghe County	Middle to Upper part	Multiple skulls	Early relatives of gazelles.	
Hezhengia	H. bohlini	Houshan, Bajia, Shuanggongbei, and Zhongmajia locality, Guanghe County	Middle part	Known from hundreds of skulls	A Urmiatheriini bovid	
Honanotherium	H. schlosseri	Houshan locality, Guanghe County	Middle part		An ancient giraffid	
Miotragocerus	M. gregarius	Houshan locality, Guanghe County	Middle part		An extinct antelope	
Paleotragus	P. microdon	Houshan locality, Guanghe County	Upper part		An ancient giraffid	
Protoryx	P. sp.	Houshan locality, Guanghe County	Upper part		An ancient bovid	
Samotherium	S. boissieri	Houshan locality, Guanghe County	Middle part	A cranium skull.	An ancient giraffid	
Schansitherium	S. tafeli	Dashengou and Yangjiashan, Gansu County	Upper part	A cranium skull.	A four-horned giraffid	
Shaanxispira	S. linxiaensis.	Panyang and Songjianao locality.	Lower to Middle part	A cranium skull.	An ancient bovid	
Sinotragus	S. wimani	Songshugou locality, Guanghe County	Upper part		An ancient bovid	
Tsaidamotherium	T. brevirostrum	Yancaiping locality, Hezheng County.	Lower part.	A cranium skull.	An ovibovinid caprinae .	
Urmiatherium	U. intermedium	Huaigou village, Gansu province	Upper part	A male adult skull	An early caprinae.	

==== Carnivora ====
===== Caniformia =====
Genus	Species	County	Stratigraphic position	Material	Notes	Images
Agriotherium	A. inexpetans	Yangjiashan, Gansu County	Middle part		An omnivorous ailuropodine bear	
Agriotheriini indet.	Indeterminate	Houshan locality, Guanghe County	Middle part		Two currently unnamed species	
Agnotherium	A. sp.	Xiaoyao locality, South of the Guangtong river.	Lower part	A skull	A bear-dog	
Martes	M. sp.	Houshan locality, Guanghe County	Middle Part		A marten	
Miomachairodus	M. sp.		Lower point	A maxilla		
Melodon	M. majori		Middle part		A musteloid	
Parataxidea	P. sinensis	Houshan locality, Guanghe County	Upper part	A fossil skull with maxillary teeth.	a badger-like mustelid	
Pekania	P. sp.	Houshan locality, Guanghe County	Middle Part		A fisher	
Promeles	P. sp.	Houshan locality, Guanghe County	Middle Part			
Promephitis	P. hootoni	Houshan locality, Guanghe County	Middle part		A musteloid	
Promephitis	P. sp.		Middle part		A musteloid	
Promephitis	P. parvus	Houshan locality, Guanghe County	Middle part		A musteloid	
Sinictis	S. sp.		Middle part		A musteloid	
Ursavus	U. tedfordi	Huaigou village, Guanghe County	Upper part	A cranium skull in association with the mandible	An early bear	

===== Feliformia =====
Genus	Species	County	Stratigraphic position	Material	Notes	Images
Adcrocuta	A. eximia	Houshan locality, Guanghe County	Middle Part		A hyaenid	
Albanosmilus	A. sp.	Houshan locality, Guanghe County	Middle part		A barbourofeline nimravid	
Amphimachairodus	A. hezhengensis	Houshan, Guanghe County	Middle part.	A nearly complete cranium skull	A homotheriine machairodontine felid	
Amphimachairodus	A. horribilis	Yangjiashan, Gansu County	Upper part	Cranial remains	The largest species of Amphimachairodus	
Dinocrocuta	D. gigantea	Houshan locality, Guanghe County; Dashengou, Gansu County	Middle part	Multiple complete and partial skulls and at least one postcranial specimen.	A gigantic hyena, the most common carnivoran in the Dashengou Fauna	
Dinocrocuta	D. yingliangi	Xiaoyao locality, South of the Guangtong river.	Lowermost	A partial skull	Slightly smaller than D. gigantea	
Felis	F. sp.	Guanghe County	Upper part to Middle part		A felid	
Gansuyaena	G. megalotis	Unknown	Lower part?	A skull	Locality uncertain may be from the Hujialiang formation instead	
Hyaenictitherium	H. hyaenoides	Houshan locality, Guanghe County	Upper part to Middle part		A hyaenid	
Hyaenictitherium	H. wongii	Houshan locality, Guanghe County	Upper part to Middle part		A hyaenid	
Hyaenictitherium	H. sp.	Houshan locality, Guanghe County	Middle Part	Smaller then H. wongi	A hyaenid	
Ictitherium	I. sp.	Guanghe County	Upper part to Middle part		A hyaenid	
Ictitherium	I. cf. viverrinum	Houshan locality, Guanghe County	Middle Part		A hyaenid	
Machairodus	M. aphanistus	Shanzhuang locality	Middle part		A homotheriine machairodontine felid, and the first evidence of this species in East Asia.	
Metailurus	M. major	Guanghe County	Upper part		A metalurin felid	

==== Perissodactyla ====
The Liushu formation displays a lineage of Elasmotheriine rhinoceros throughout its stratigraphy. Iranotherium is restricted to the middle part of the formation but remains absent in the overlying layers, the only Elasmotheriine that can be found in the upper layers is Sinotherium.

===== Chalicotheres =====
Genus	Species	Locality	Stratigraphic position	Material	Notes	Images
Ancylotherium	A. sp.	Duikang locality, Guanghe County.	Lower part	A juvenile cranium skull.	A shizotheriine chalicothere	
Nestoritherium	N. linxiaense	Houshan locality, Guanghe County	Lower and Middle parts	A skull without the occipital surface, right zygomatic arch, premaxilla, and anterior nasal bone	A chalicothere	

===== Equids =====
Genus	Species	Locality	Stratigraphic position	Material	Notes	Images
Hipparion	H. coelophyes	Guanghe County	Upper part		An ancient horse	
Hipparion	H. dongxiangense		Lower part		An ancient horse	
Cormohipparion	C. dongxiangense		Lower part			
Hippotherium	H. weihoensis	Shuijiazui, Lantian, Shaanxi	Middle part Lower part		Includes H. chiai adapted for open habitat	

===== Rhinocerotids =====
Genus	Species	Locality	Stratigraphic position	Material	Notes	Images
Acerorhinus	A. hezhengensis		Middle part	Skulls based on sexual dimorphism	A hornless rhino	
Chilotherium	C. wimani	Zhongmajia, Guanghe County	Middle part	Several skull specimens.	A tusked rhino	Chilotherium
Chilotherium	C. primigenius	Zhongmajia Guanghe County	Lower part			
Iranotherium	I. morgani	Guanghe County	Middle part	Two skulls based on sexual dimorphism and an isolated mandible	An elasmotheriine with a unique sexual dimorphism, ancestral to Sinotherium	
Ningxiatherium	N. euryrhinus.	Guonigou in Nalesi Township, Dongxiang County	Lower part	A completely adult skull with both cheek tooth rows		
Parelasmotherium	P. linxiaense	Dongxiang County	Lower part	A near complete skull	A grazing elasmotheriine	
Parelasmotherium	P. simplum	Dongxiang County	Lower part		A grazing elasmotheriine	
Sinotherium	S. lagrelii	Guanghe County	Upper part	A partial skull	An elasmotheriine, ancestral to Elasmotherium. It displays the important transition from nose-horned to forehead-horned rhinos.	

==== Rodents ====
Genus	Species	County	Member	Material	Notes	Images
Huerzelerimys	H. asiaticus	Niuzhawan, Sanhe Village, Hezheng County	Upper part.	A complete skull and mandible with cervical 5	An early murine rodent	
Hystrix	H. brevirostra	Maijiaji Village, Hezheng County	Upper part.	A nearly complete skull	An early porcupine	
Pararhizomys	P. hipparionum		Middle part		A rodent	
Pararhizomys	P. parvulus	Xiayangwan, Guanghe County	Middle part	An anterior part of a skull with associated teeth	A rodent	

==== Proboscidea ====
Genus	Species	Locality	Member	Material	Notes	Images
Konobelodon	K. robustus	Zhongmajia and Guonigou, Guanghe County	Lower, Middle and Upper parts	Multiple specimens comprising a skull, pelvis bone, and incomplete mandibles	An amebelodont	
Paratetralophodon	T. exoletus	Houshan locality, Guanghe County	Middle part		A gomphothere	
Tetralophodon	euryrostris	Unknown	Lower part	Two mandibles	A gomphothere	
Prodeinotherium	P. sinense		Lower part	A mandible	A Deinothere	

=== Reptiles ===
Genus	Species	Locality	Stratigraphic position	Material	Notes	Images
Eryx	E. linxiaensis	Shangwangjia Village, Guanghe County	Upper part	A series of partially preserved cranial and post-cranial elements	A sand boa	
