= Alagoas screech owl =

Scientific classification
- Domain: Eukaryota
- Kingdom: Animalia
- Phylum: Chordata
- Class: Aves
- Order: Strigiformes
- Family: Strigidae
- Genus: Megascops
- Species: M. alagoensis

Binomial name
- Megascops alagoensis Dantas, SM; Weckstein, JD; Bates, JM; Oliveira, JN; Catanach, TA; Aleixo, ALP 2021

Synonyms
- Megascops atricapilla (Temminck, 1822)

Species of owl

The Alagoas screech owl (Megascops alagoensis) is a species of owl in the family Strigidae. It is found only in the Atlantic Forest north of the São Francisco River of Brazil, and is threatened by forest fragmentation. The holotype was collected at Engenho Coimbra. It is closely related to black-capped screech owl in both morphology and genetics.

This species was described in 2021, and thus recognized in Avibase taxonomic concepts. It is named for the Brazilian state of Alagoas, where it was first found.

== See also ==
- List of bird species described in the 2020s
