= Gracilisgallus =

Gracilisgallus Temporal range: Late Miocene–Early Pliocene, 3.6–5.3 Ma

Scientific classification
- Kingdom: Animalia
- Phylum: Chordata
- Class: Aves
- Order: Galliformes
- Family: Phasianidae
- Genus: †Gracilisgallus; Yu & Li, 2025
- Species: †G. linxia

Binomial name
- †Gracilisgallus linxia Yu & Li, 2025

Extinct bird genus

Gracilisgallus (meaning "slender chicken") is an extinct genus of phasianid birds known from the Late Miocene–Early Pliocene Linxia Basin (Liushu Formation–Hewangjia Formation) of China. The genus contains a single species, Gracilisgallus linxia, known from an almost complete articulated skeleton. Gracilisgallus is likely a close relative of modern grouse and turkeys. Panraogallus, another phasianid, is one of many other well-preserved birds known from the Liushu Formation.

== Discovery and naming ==
The Gracilisgallus holotype specimen, IVPP V30721, was discovered in outcrops bordering the upper Liushu Formation and lower Hewangjia Formation near Shi-li-dun village in Gansu Province, China. The specimen is a nearly complete, articulated skeleton preserved three-dimensionally. Some regions, such as the back of the skull, the lower part of the left hindlimb, and parts of the pelvis, are missing or poorly preserved.

In 2025, Ting-Yu Yu and Zhi-Heng Li described Gracilisgallus linxia as a new genus and species of extinct phasianid bird based on these fossil remains. The generic name, Gracilisgallus, combines the Latin words gracilis, meaning "slender", and gallus, meaning "chicken" ("rooster"), in reference to the slender morphology of the taxon's skeleton. The specific name, linxia, references the type locality in the Linxia Basin.

== Description ==
The Gracilisgallus holotype represents a small bird in the pheasant family; the smallest living grouse genus, Tetrastes, is slightly larger. Its limb bones are notably slender, and the femur (6.78 cm (2.67 in)) is longer than the humerus (5.46 cm (2.15 in)). Many birds in this family bear a distinct spur on the back of the tarsometatarsus (lower leg). In Gracilisgallus, this spur is long, extending from the lower part of this region. The prominence of this structure may indicate that the holotype is a male individual, and the high degree of ossification of the limb bones implies it was a mature adult at the time of death.

== Classification ==
To test the relationships and affinities of Gracilisgallus, Yu & Li (2025) scored it in a phylogenetic dataset including 62 extant (living) and four extinct species, based on morphological characters, most of which relate to the skeleton. Their results placed Gracilisgallus as a late-diverging member of the Phasianidae, in a polytomy with extant turkeys and grouse, generally referred to as the Tetraonini. These results are displayed in the cladogram below. While the evolutionary relationships of Gracilisgallus in relation to these two lineages are unresolved in the analysis, it is possible that it represents a lineage that is ancestral to either or both groups.

- Phasianidae
  - Rollulinae
    ⊞
    - Arborophila torqueola
    - Rollulus roulroul
    ⊟
  - Phasianinae
    - - Ithaginis cruentus
      - - - Polyplectronini
            ⊞
            - Polyplectron inopinatum
            ⊟
          - Pavonini
            ⊞
            - - Argusianus argus
              - Rheinardia ocellata
            - - Afropavo congensis
              - Pavo cristatus
            ⊟
        - - Gallini
            ⊞
            - Francolinus francolinus
            - Rhizothera longirostris
            - - Gallus gallus
              - Bambusicola thoracica
            ⊟
          - Coturnicini
            ⊞
            - - Alectoris graeca
              - Tetraogallus himalayensis
            - - Pternistis afer
              - Pternistis squamatus
              - - Ammoperdix heyi
                - - Synoicus chinensis
                  - - Coturnix japonica
                    - Margaroperdix madagarensis
            ⊟
    - - Lophophorini
        ⊞
        - Lophophorus impejanus
        - Tragopan satyra
        ⊟
      - - Phasianini
          ⊞
          - Perdix perdix
          - - Syrmaticus reevesi
            - - Chrysolophus amherstiae
              - - Phasianus colchicus
                - - Catreus wallichi
                  - - Crossoptilon crossoptilon
                    - Lophura bulweri
          ⊟
        - Tetraonini
          - Pucrasia macrolopha
          - - †Gracilisgallus linxia
            - Turkeys
              ⊞
              - Meleagris gallopavo
              - Meleagris ocellata
              ⊟
            - Grouse
              ⊞
              - Tetrastes bonasia
              - - Canachites canadensis
                - Lagopus lagopus
                - Lyrurus tetrix
                - - Centrocercus urophasianus
                  - Tympanuchus phasianellus
              ⊟
