= Xingu screech owl =

Scientific classification
- Domain: Eukaryota
- Kingdom: Animalia
- Phylum: Chordata
- Class: Aves
- Order: Strigiformes
- Family: Strigidae
- Genus: Megascops
- Species: M. stangiae

Binomial name
- Megascops stangiae Dantas, SM; Weckstein, JD; Bates, JM; Oliveira, JN; Catanach, TA; Aleixo, ALP 2021

Synonyms
- Otus watsonii usta (Sclater, 1858); Megascops usta (Sclater, 1858); Megascops watsonii usta (Sclater, 1858)

Species of owl

The Xingu screech owl (Megascops stangiae) is a species of owl in the family Strigidae. It is found only in the Tapajos-Xingu and Xingu-Tocantins of Brazil. The holotype was collected in Serra dos Carajás. It is closely related to tawny-bellied screech owl in both morphology and genetics, but could be differed by its longer song pace.

This species was described in 2021, and thus recognized in Avibase taxonomic concepts.

== See also ==
- List of bird species described in the 2020s
