= Linxiavis =

Linxiavis Temporal range: Miocene, 9–6 Ma

Scientific classification
- Kingdom: Animalia
- Phylum: Chordata
- Class: Aves
- Order: Pterocliformes
- Family: Pteroclidae
- Genus: †Linxiavis; Li et al., 2020
- Species: †L. inaquosus

Binomial name
- †Linxiavis inaquosus Li et al., 2020

Extinct genus of birds

Linxiavis inaquosus is an extinct species of sandgrouse known from a partial skeleton, found in the Late Miocene Liushu Formation (6–9 Ma) at the edge of the Tibetan Plateau in Gansu Province of China. It is the most substantial and oldest record of crown Sandgrouse in China which adds to the rapidly growing avian fauna of the Liushu Formation.

== Discovery, research and history ==
Linxiavis was described in 2020 on the basis of articulated and associated elements of the wings, shoulder girdle, vertebrae, and hind limb that exhibited apomorphies of Columbiformes and Sandgrouses (Pteroclidae) such as a notarium, and a short coracoid shaft.

It was a part of the diverse "Hipparion fauna", which reinforces the consensus that late Miocene Linxia Basin was an arid savannah, associated with the uplift of the Tibetan Plateau. The holotype fossil suggests that the arid and high elevation Tibetan habitats may have been continuously occupied since the late Miocene by sandgrouse that would've been carrying water in their modified breast feathers to their young.

== See also ==
- List of bird species described in the 2020s
