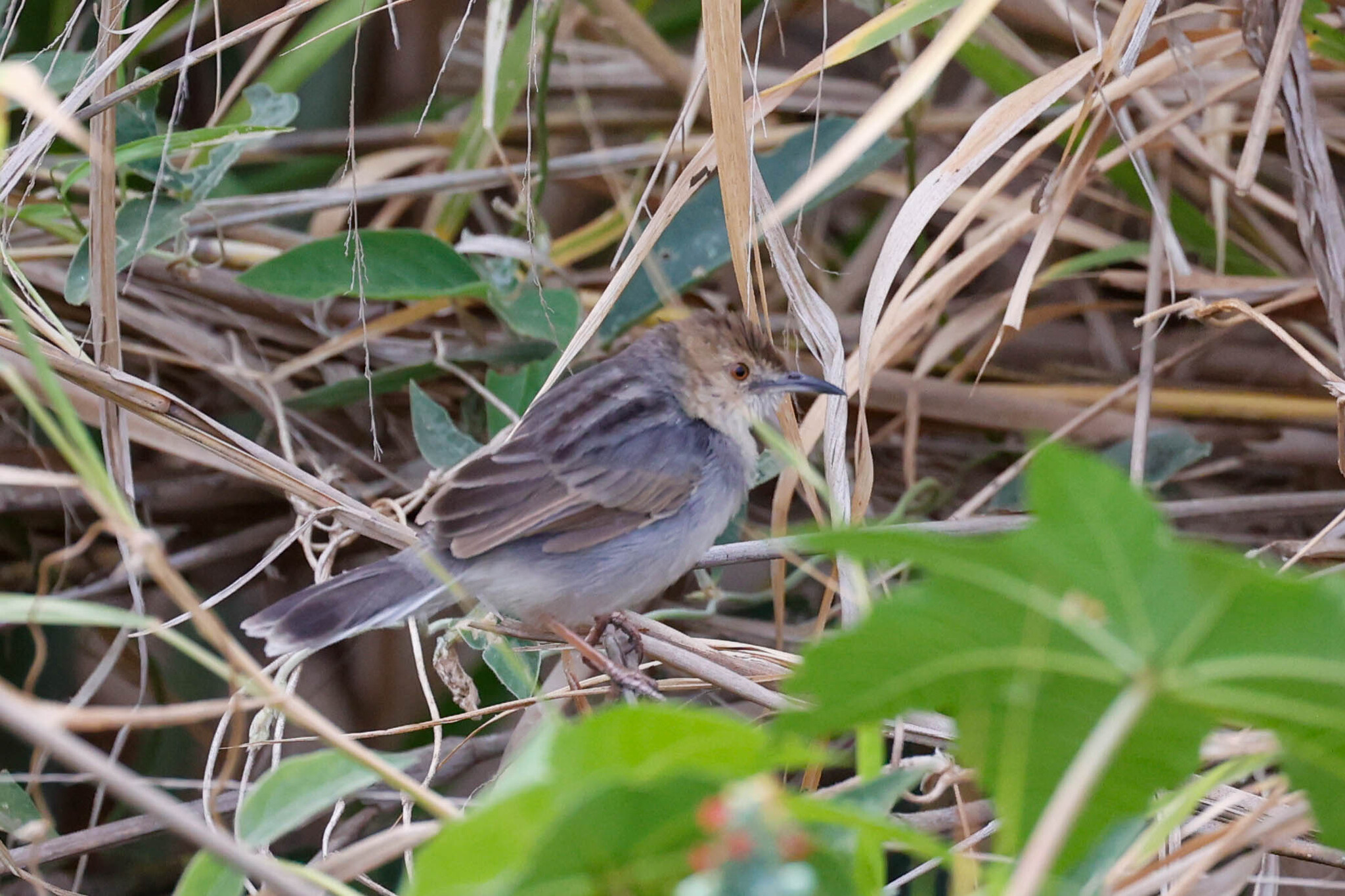

Conservation status
- Near Threatened (IUCN 3.1)

Scientific classification
- Kingdom: Animalia
- Phylum: Chordata
- Class: Aves
- Order: Passeriformes
- Family: Cisticolidae
- Genus: Cisticola
- Species: C. anderseni

Binomial name
- Cisticola anderseni Fjeldså et al., 2021

= White-tailed cisticola =

Species of bird

The white-tailed cisticola (Cisticola anderseni) is a species of bird in the family Cisticolidae. It is found in Tanzania.

It was first recognised as a new species by Éric Burnier in the 1980s. He brought this to the attention of Neil and Liz Baker, who soon confirmed the identity of this species as new. It has been formally described in 2021.

== See also ==
- List of bird species described in the 2020s
