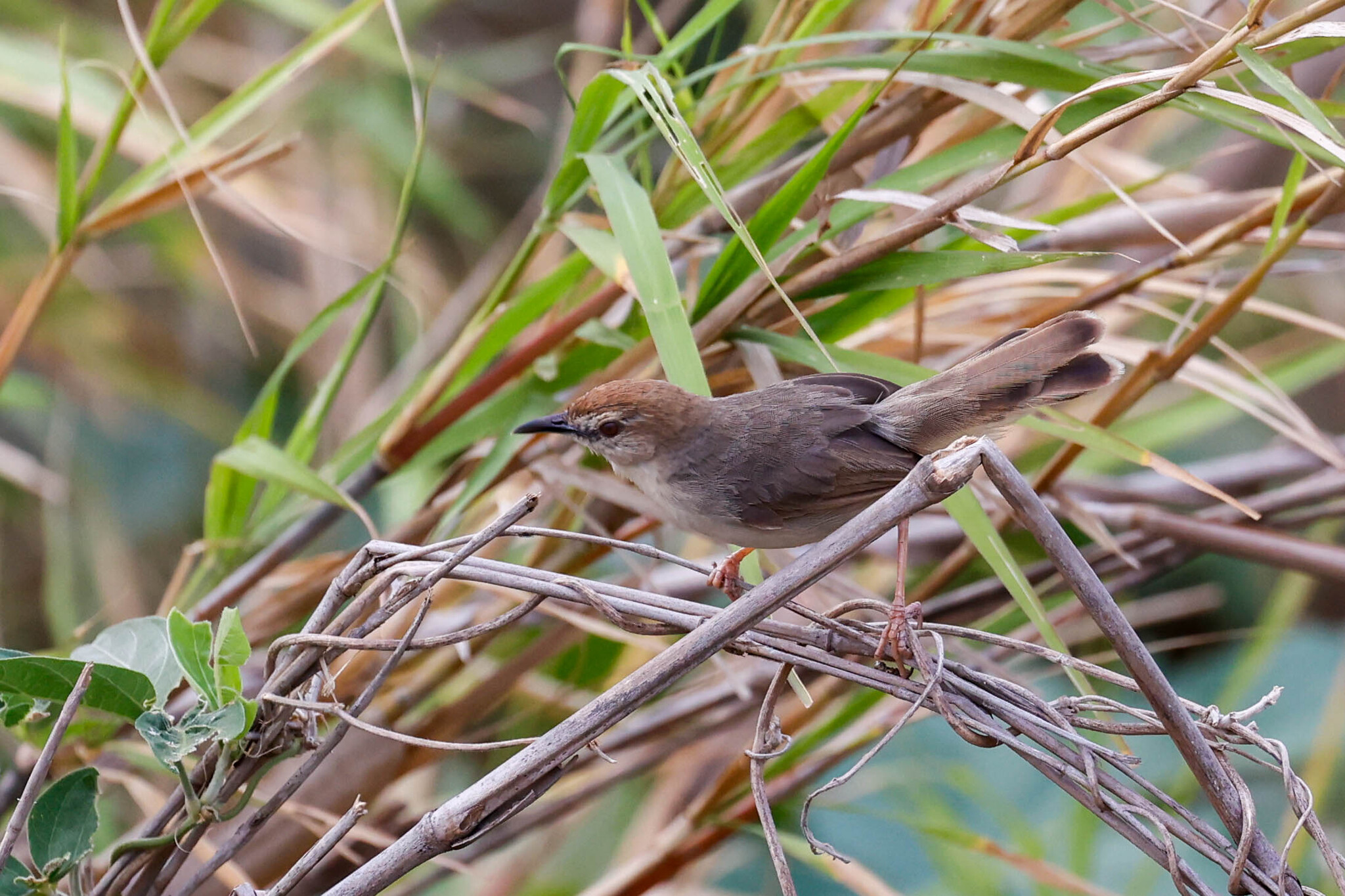

Conservation status
- Vulnerable (IUCN 3.1)

Scientific classification
- Kingdom: Animalia
- Phylum: Chordata
- Class: Aves
- Order: Passeriformes
- Family: Cisticolidae
- Genus: Cisticola
- Species: C. bakerorum

Binomial name
- Cisticola bakerorum Fjeldså, Dinesen, Davies, Irestedt, Krabbe, Hansen & Bowie, 2021

= Kilombero cisticola =

Species of bird

The Kilombero cisticola (Cisticola bakerorum) is a species of bird in the family Cisticolidae. It is found in Tanzania.

It was first recognised as new by Éric Burnier in the 1980s. He brought this to the attention of Neil and Liz Baker, who soon confirmed the identity of this species as new to science. It was formally described in 2021 and dedicated to the Bakers.

== See also ==
- List of bird species described in the 2020s
