= Surnia robusta =

Surnia robusta Temporal range: Early Pleistocene

Scientific classification
- Kingdom: Animalia
- Phylum: Chordata
- Class: Aves
- Order: Strigiformes
- Family: Strigidae
- Genus: Surnia
- Species: †S. robusta

Binomial name
- †Surnia robusta Jánossy, 1977

Extinct species of owl

Surnia robusta is an extinct species of owl in the genus Surnia that lived in Central Europe during the Pleistocene epoch.

== Etymology ==
The specific epithet of S. robusta is derived from the Latin robustus, meaning strong or large, referencing the animal's large dimensions.

== Palaeobiology ==
=== Diet ===
This species of owl may have, through feeding behaviour, been responsible for the enormous accumulations of leporid remains at the late Early Pleistocene site of Somssich Hill 2 in Hungary, although others suggest a larger owl in the genus Bubo was the causal agent.
