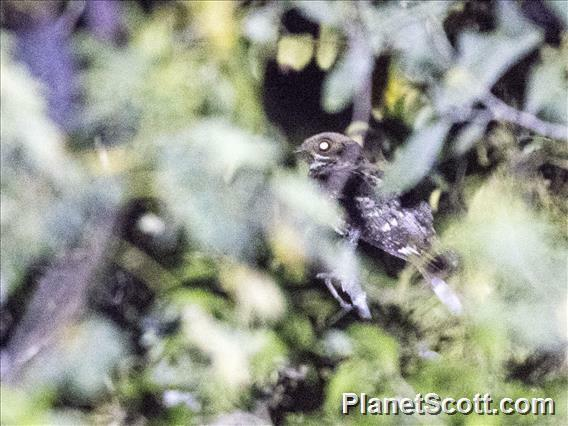

Scientific classification
- Kingdom: Animalia
- Phylum: Chordata
- Class: Aves
- Order: Caprimulgiformes
- Family: Caprimulgidae
- Genus: Caprimulgus
- Species: C. ritae

Binomial name
- Caprimulgus ritae King, BF, Sangster, Trainor, Irestedt, Prawiradilaga & Ericson, 2024

= Timor nightjar =

Species of bird

The Timor nightjar (Caprimulgus ritae) is a species of nightjar in the family Caprimulgidae. It is found in Southeast Asia on the islands of Timor, Rote and Wetar in the Lesser Sunda Islands.

It was first described in 2024 by Ben King and collaborators under the binomial name Caprimulgus ritae. The specific epithet ritae was chosen to honour Rita Bobbin, a friend of King. Genetic analysis found that it is most similar to Mees's nightjar (Capimulgus meesi).

== See also ==
- List of bird species described in the 2020s
