= Parataxidea =

Parataxidea Temporal range: Neogene
- Skeleton of P. sinensis, Shanghai Natural History Museum

Scientific classification
- Kingdom: Animalia
- Phylum: Chordata
- Class: Mammalia
- Order: Carnivora
- Family: Mustelidae
- Genus: †Parataxidea; Zdansky, 1924

Extinct genus of mammals

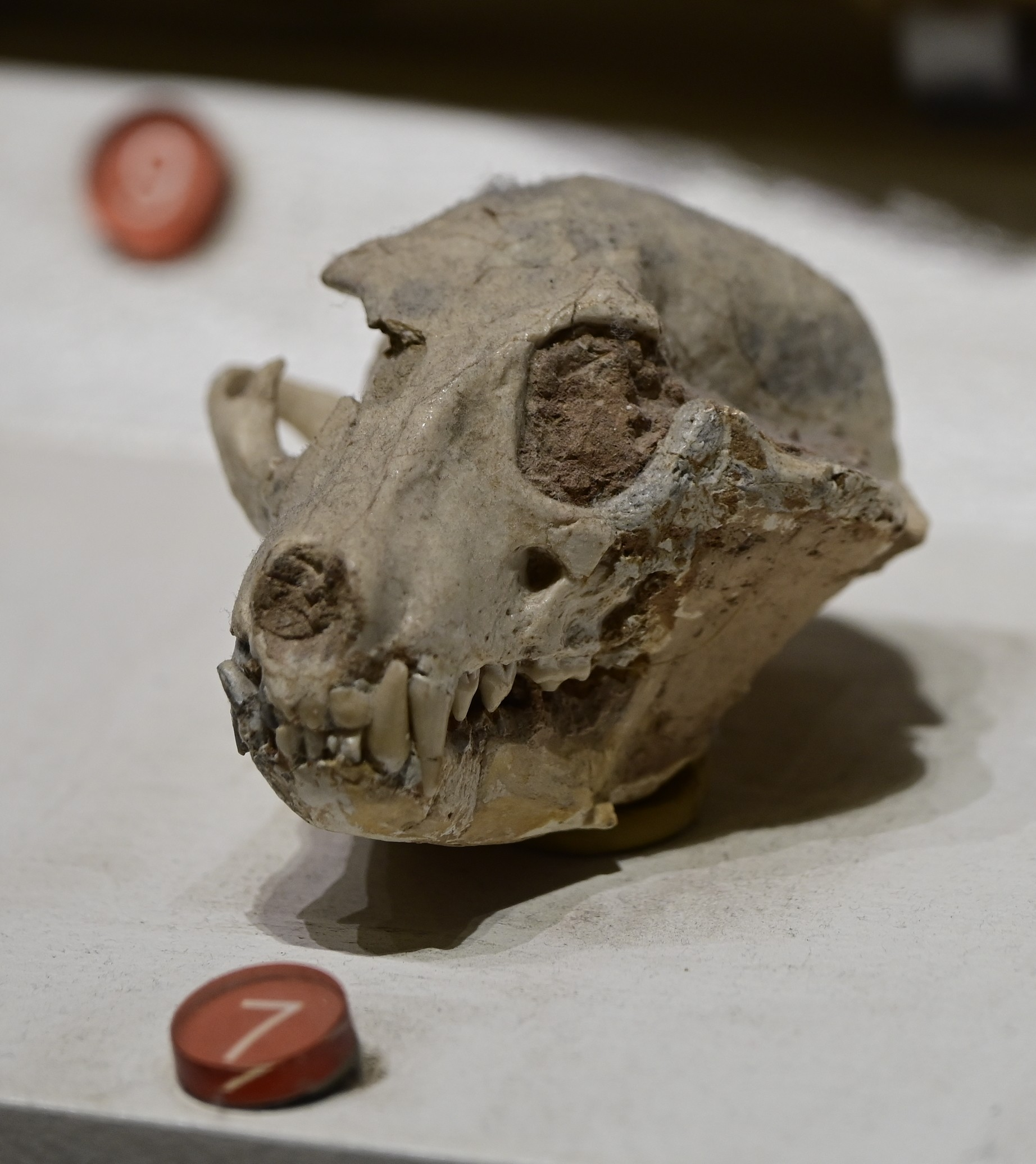
Fossil skull

Parataxidea is an extinct genus of mustelid that lived in Eurasia during the Late Miocene and Early Pliocene.

== Distribution ==
P. sinensis is known from fossils found in China. P. maraghana is known from Turkey.

== Palaeopathology ==
A Parataxidea sp. specimen has been found in the Liushu Formation displaying evidence of ossifying fibroma.
