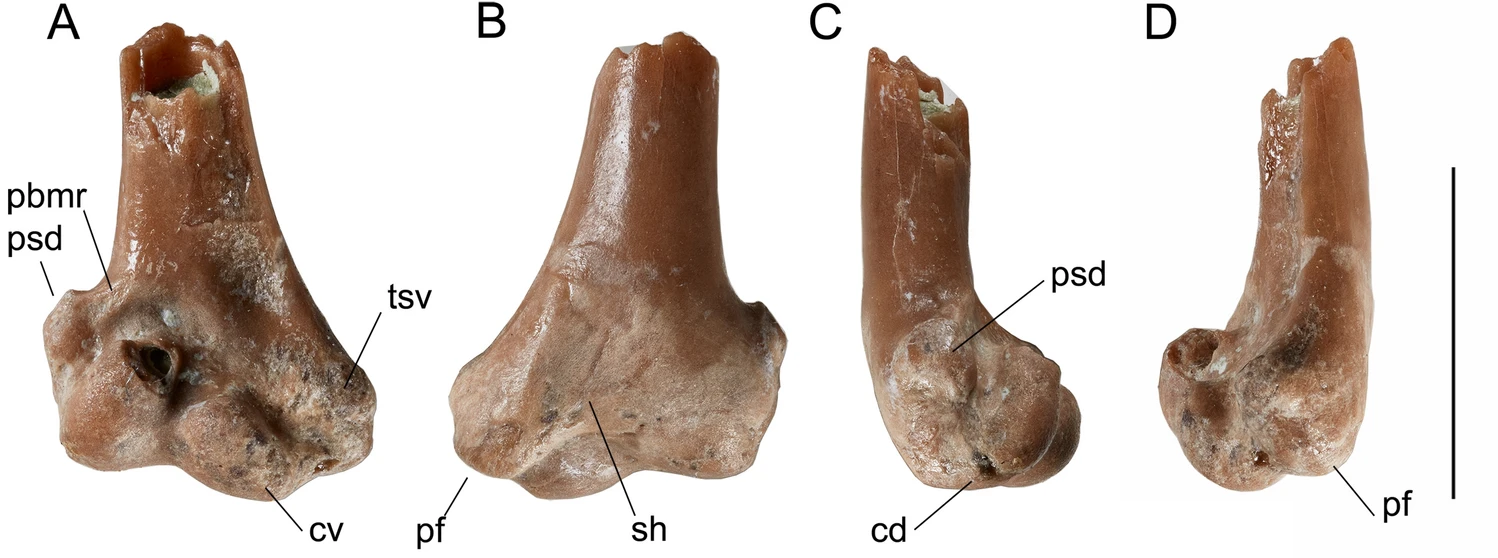
- Holotype humerus in cranial (A), caudal (B), dorsal (C), and ventral (D) views

Scientific classification
- Kingdom: Animalia
- Phylum: Chordata
- Class: Aves
- Family: †Zealandornithidae; Worthy et al., 2022
- Genus: †Zealandornis; Worthy et al., 2022
- Species: †Z. relictus

Binomial name
- †Zealandornis relictus Worthy et al., 2022

= Zealandornis =

Zealandornis Temporal range: Early Miocene, 19–16 Ma

Extinct genus of birds

Zealandornis (meaning "Zealandia bird") is an extinct genus of zealandornithid bird from the early Miocene Bannockburn Formation of Otago, New Zealand. The genus contains a single species, Zealandornis relictus, known from a distal right humerus.

== Discovery and naming ==
The Zealandornis holotype specimen, NMNZ S.52077, was discovered on the east bank of the Manuherikia River in a lower layer of the Bannockburn Formation in the Manuherikia Group, near St Bathans, Otago, New Zealand.

In 2022, Worthy et al. described Zealandornis relictus, a new extinct genus and species of bird. The generic name, "Zealandornis", combines a reference to the taxon's origin from Zealandia with the Greek "ὄρνις (ornis)", meaning "bird". The specific name, "relictus", refers to something that is "remaining" or "left behind".

== Classification ==
Zealandornis is a member of the monotypic family Zealandornithidae. This clade, erected with the description of Zealandornis, was likely a member of the Telluraves, with similarities to the Coliiformes.

== See also ==
- List of bird species described in the 2020s
