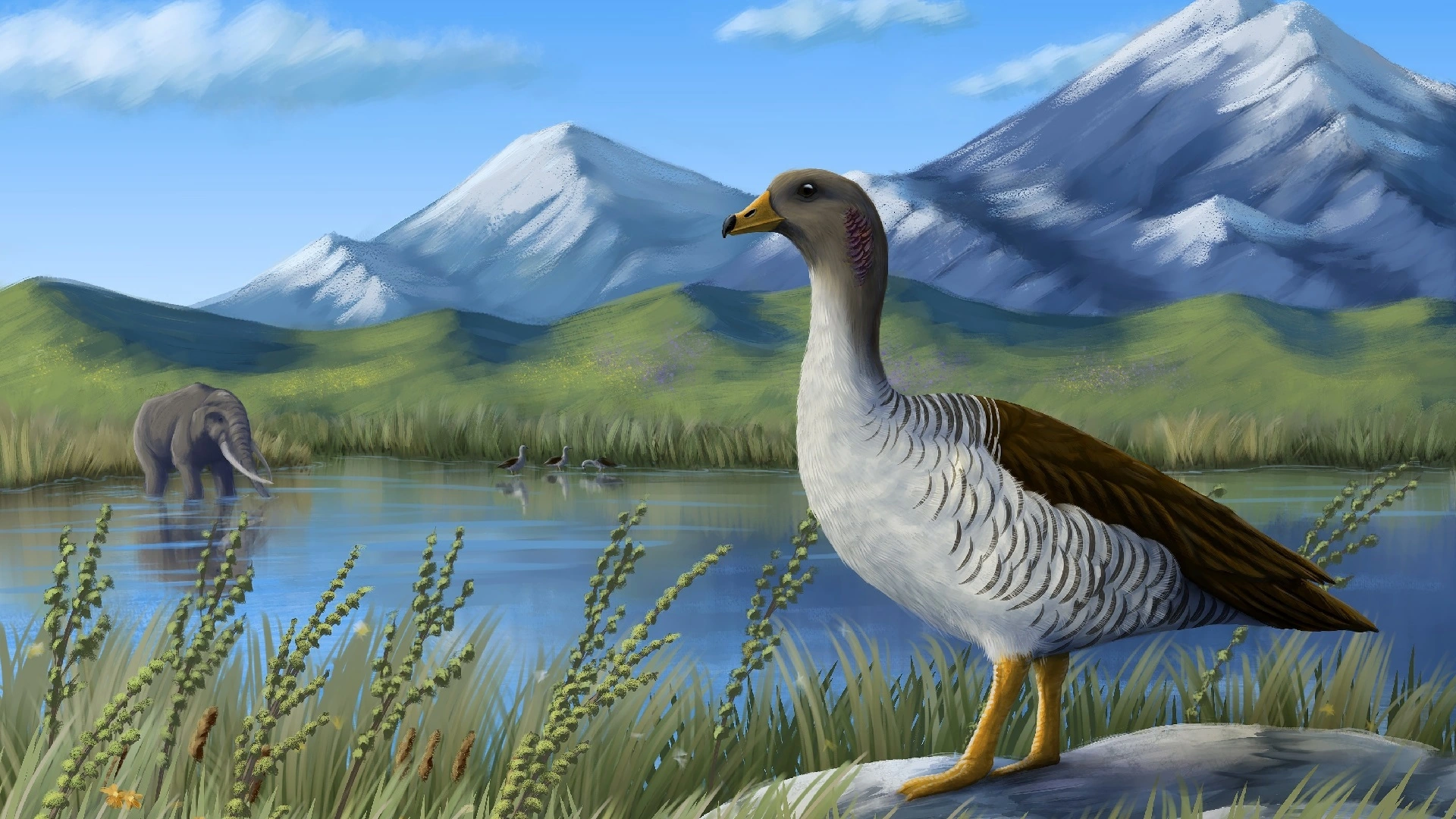
- Life restoration of C. dabbenei

Scientific classification
- Kingdom: Animalia
- Phylum: Chordata
- Class: Aves
- Order: Anseriformes
- Family: Anatidae
- Genus: Chloephaga
- Species: †C. dabbenei

Binomial name
- †Chloephaga dabbenei Agnolín et al., 2024

= Chloephaga dabbenei =

Chloephaga dabbenei Temporal range: Pleistocene

Extinct species of bird

Chloephaga dabbenei is an extinct species of Chloephaga that inhabited Argentina during the Pleistocene epoch.

The species was discovered in San José, Buenos Aires and first described in 2024. The specific name, dabbenei, was chosen in honor of the Italian-Argentine ornithologist Roberto Dabbene. C. dabbenei is distinguished from other species of Chloephaga by its robust size, comparatively thick neck, and small humerus bones.

== See also ==
- List of bird species described in the 2020s
