= Shchuchya =

Schuchya

Location
- Country: Russia

Physical characteristics
- Mouth: Ob
  - coordinates: 66.7978°N 68.3731°E
- Length: 565 km (351 mi)
- Basin size: 12,300 km^{2} (4,700 sq mi)

Basin features
- Progression: Ob→ Kara Sea

The Schuchya is a river in Yamalo-Nenets Autonomous Okrug, Russia, a left tributary of the Ob. It is 565 kilometres (351 mi) long, and has a drainage basin of 12,300 square kilometres (4,700 sq mi). It discharges into the Malaya Ob, a left branch of the Ob.
