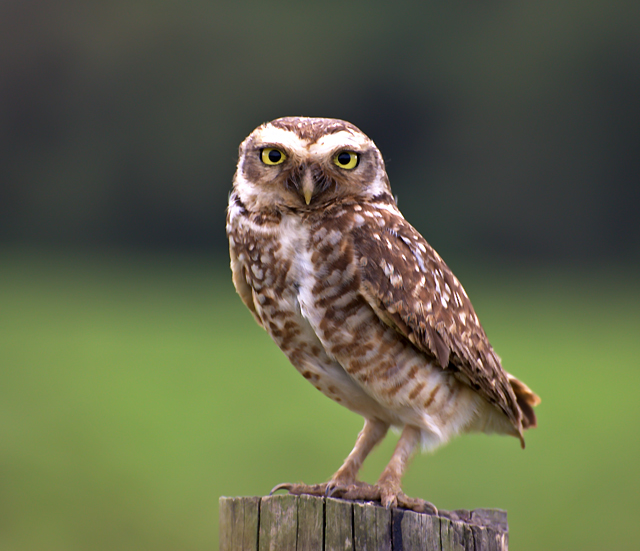

Scientific classification
- Kingdom: Animalia
- Phylum: Chordata
- Class: Aves
- Order: Strigiformes
- Family: Strigidae
- Subfamily: Surniinae; Bonaparte, 1838

Type genus
- Surnia

= Surniinae =

Subfamily of owls

Surniinae is a subfamily of the typical owls (Strigidae). First described by French ornithologist Charles Lucien Bonaparte in 1838. The type genus is Surnia. Includes ten genera.

== Classification ==
Surniinae includes ten genera (one extinct), from which five (Xenoglaux, Micrathene, Surnia, Uroglaux, Sceloglaux) are monotypic.

- Genus Xenoglaux — long-whiskered owlet
- Genus Micrathene — elf owl
- Genus Aegolius
- Genus Athene
- Genus Surnia
- Genus Glaucidium — pygmy owls
- Genus Ninox
- Genus Taenioptynx
- Genus Uroglaux — Papuan hawk-owl
- Genus †Sceloglaux — laughing owl
