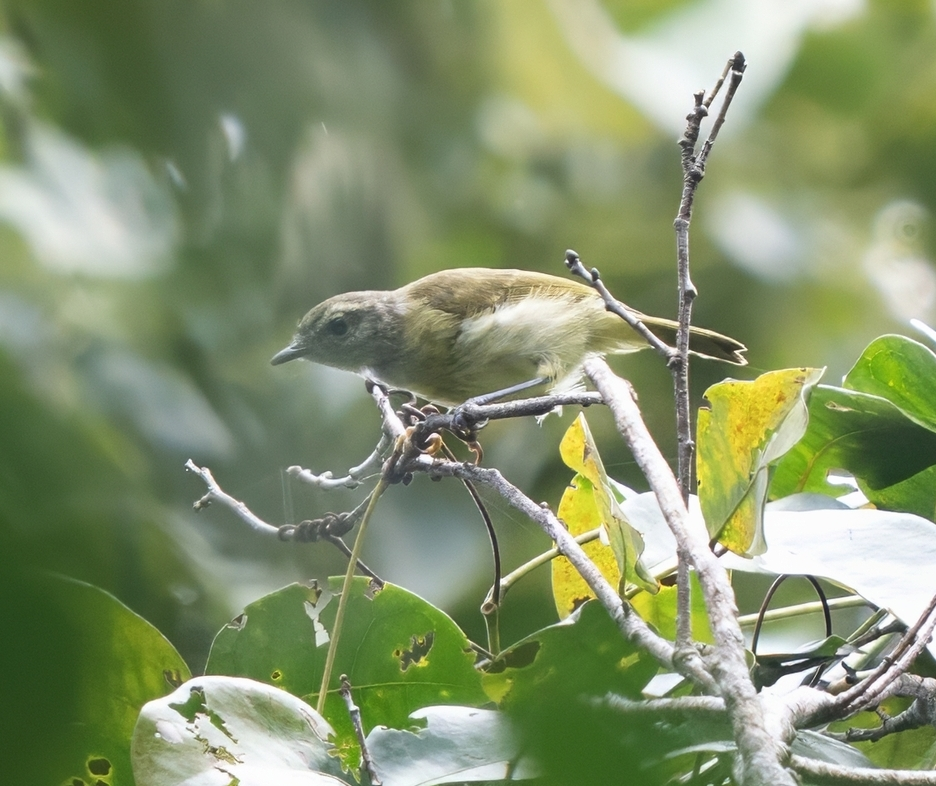

Conservation status
- Least Concern (IUCN 3.1)

Scientific classification
- Kingdom: Animalia
- Phylum: Chordata
- Class: Aves
- Order: Passeriformes
- Family: Phylloscopidae
- Genus: Phylloscopus
- Species: P. poliocephalus

Binomial name
- Phylloscopus poliocephalus (Salvadori, 1876)

= Island leaf warbler =

Species of bird

The island leaf warbler (Phylloscopus poliocephalus) is a species of Old World warbler in the family Phylloscopidae. It is found in an area ranging from the Moluccas to the Solomon Islands.

== Taxonomy ==
The island leaf warbler was formally described in 1876 as Gerygone? poliocephala by the Italian zoologist Tommaso Salvadori based on a specimen collected in the Arfak Mountains of western New Guinea. The specific epithet combines the Ancient Greek πολιος/polios meaning "grey" or "grizzled" with -κεφαλος/-kephalos meaning "-headed". The island leaf warbler is now one of around 80 leaf warblers placed in the genus Phylloscopus that was introduced in 1826 by the German zoologist Friedrich Boie.

Eighteen subspecies are recognised:

- P. p. suaramerdu Rheindt, FE, Prawiradilaga, DM, Ashari, H, Suparno & Ng, NSR, 2020 – montane Peleng, in Banggai Island (off eastern Sulawesi) (Peleng leaf warbler)
- P. p. emilsalimi Rheindt, FE, Prawiradilaga, DM, Ashari, H, Suparno & Ng, NSR, 2020 – montane Taliabu (Sula Islands) (Taliabu leaf warbler)
- P. p. henrietta Stresemann, EFT, 1931 – northern Moluccas (Halmahera and Ternate)
- P. p. waterstradti (Hartert, EJO, 1903) – montane Moluccas (Bacan Islands and Obi Islands)
- P. p. everetti (Hartert, EJO, 1899) – montane Buru (southern Moluccas)
- P. p. ceramensis (Ogilvie-Grant, WR, 1910) – montane southern Moluccas (Seram and Ambon)
- P. p. avicola Hartert, EJO, 1924 – montane Kai Besar Island (Kai Islands)
- P. p. matthiae Rothschild, LW & Hartert, EJO, 1924 – Mussau Island, in St. Matthias Group (north-central Bismarck Archipelago)
- P. p. moorhousei Gilliard, ET & LeCroy, MK, 1967 – montane New Britain and Umboi Island (southeastern Bismarck Archipelago)
- P. p. leletensis Salomonsen, F, 1965 – montane New Ireland (northeastern Bismarck Archipelago)
- P. p. poliocephalus (Salvadori, AT, 1876) – montane northwestern New Guinea (Tamrau, Arfak, and Wandammen mountains)
- P. p. albigularis Hartert, EJO & Paludan, KJ, 1936 – montane west-central New Guinea
- P. p. cyclopum Hartert, EJO, 1930 – montane northern New Guinea (Cyclops Mountains)
- P. p. giulianettii (Salvadori, AT, 1896) – montane New Guinea (Snow, Sepik, Saruwaged, and Herzog mountains)
- P. p. hamlini Mayr, E & Rand, AL, 1935 – Goodenough Island, in D'Entrecasteaux Archipelago (off southeastern New Guinea)
- P. p. becki Hartert, EJO, 1929 – montane Guadalcanal, Santa Isabel, and Malaita (central Solomon Islands)
- P. p. bougainvillei Mayr, E, 1935 – montane Bougainville Island (northwestern Solomon Islands)
- P. p. pallescens Mayr, E, 1935 – montane Kolombangara (west-central Solomon Islands)
