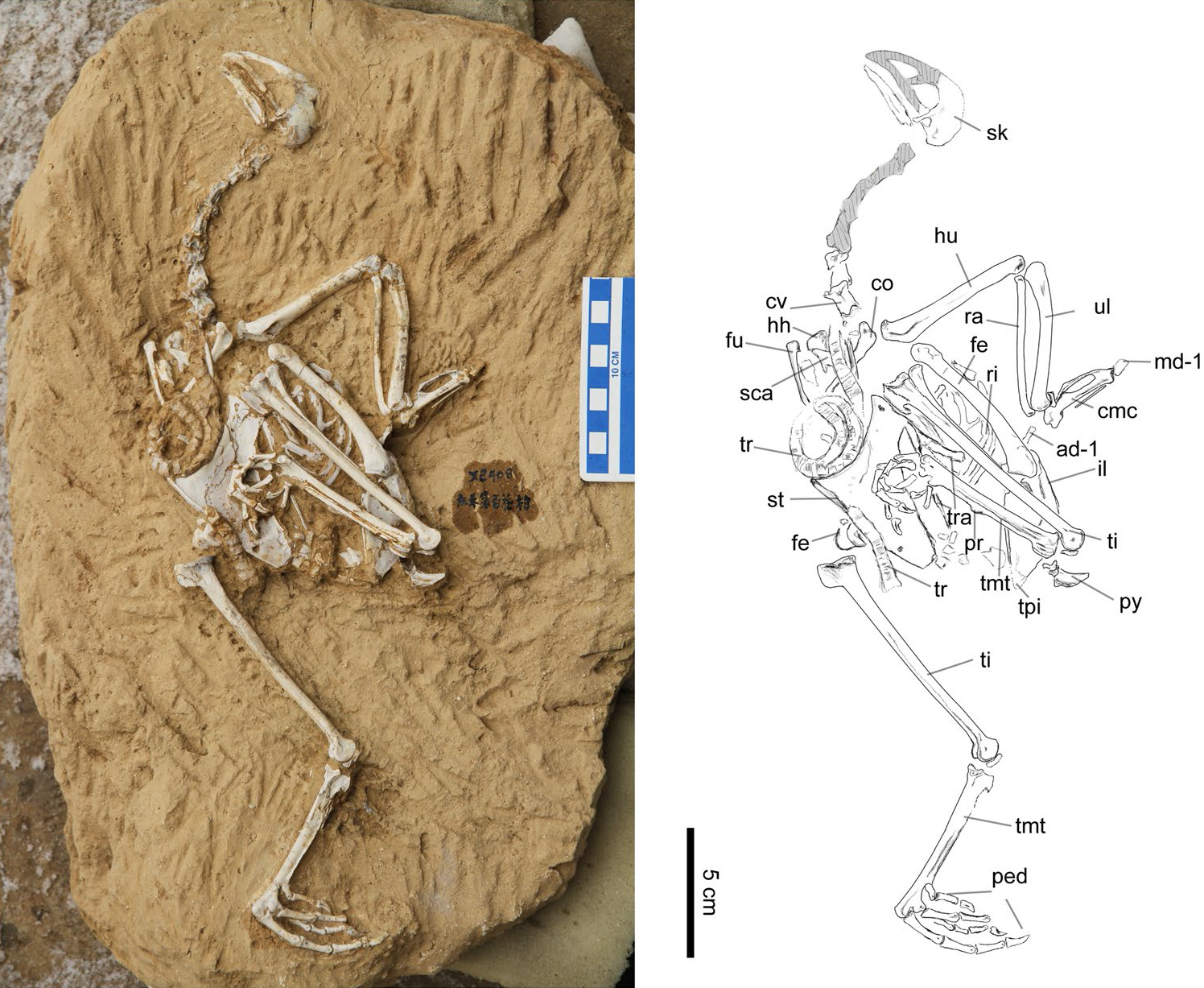
- Holotype specimen with diagram; the grey parts show plaster reconstruction

Scientific classification
- Kingdom: Animalia
- Phylum: Chordata
- Class: Aves
- Order: Galliformes
- Family: Phasianidae
- Genus: †Panraogallus; Li et al. 2018

Species
- Panraogallus hezhengensis Li et al. 2018

= Panraogallus =

Panraogallus Temporal range: Late Miocene

Extinct genus of birds

Panraogallus is an extinct genus of phasianid bird (the family that contains pheasants and their relatives) from the Late Miocene of what is now China. The holotype specimen was discovered in the Liushu Formation near the Zhuangkeji Township in Guanghe County, Gansu Province. The specimen consists of an almost complete skeleton of a young adult (perhaps a male, since it appears to have had a spur), though part of the skull and the neck vertebrae were reconstructed in plaster before the specimen was acquired by the Hezheng Paleozoological Museum. The specimen also preserves an elongated, coiled trachea (or windpipe), the oldest known bird fossil with such a structure. The specimen was made the basis of the new genus and species Panraogallus hezhengensis by the Chinese palaeontologist Zhihen Li and colleagues in 2018. The generic name is the pinyin of the Chinese characters for "coiling" and Latin for "chicken", which refers to the elongated trachea; "coiled chicken" in full. The specific name refers to the Hezheng area, where abundant specimens of this bird have been found.

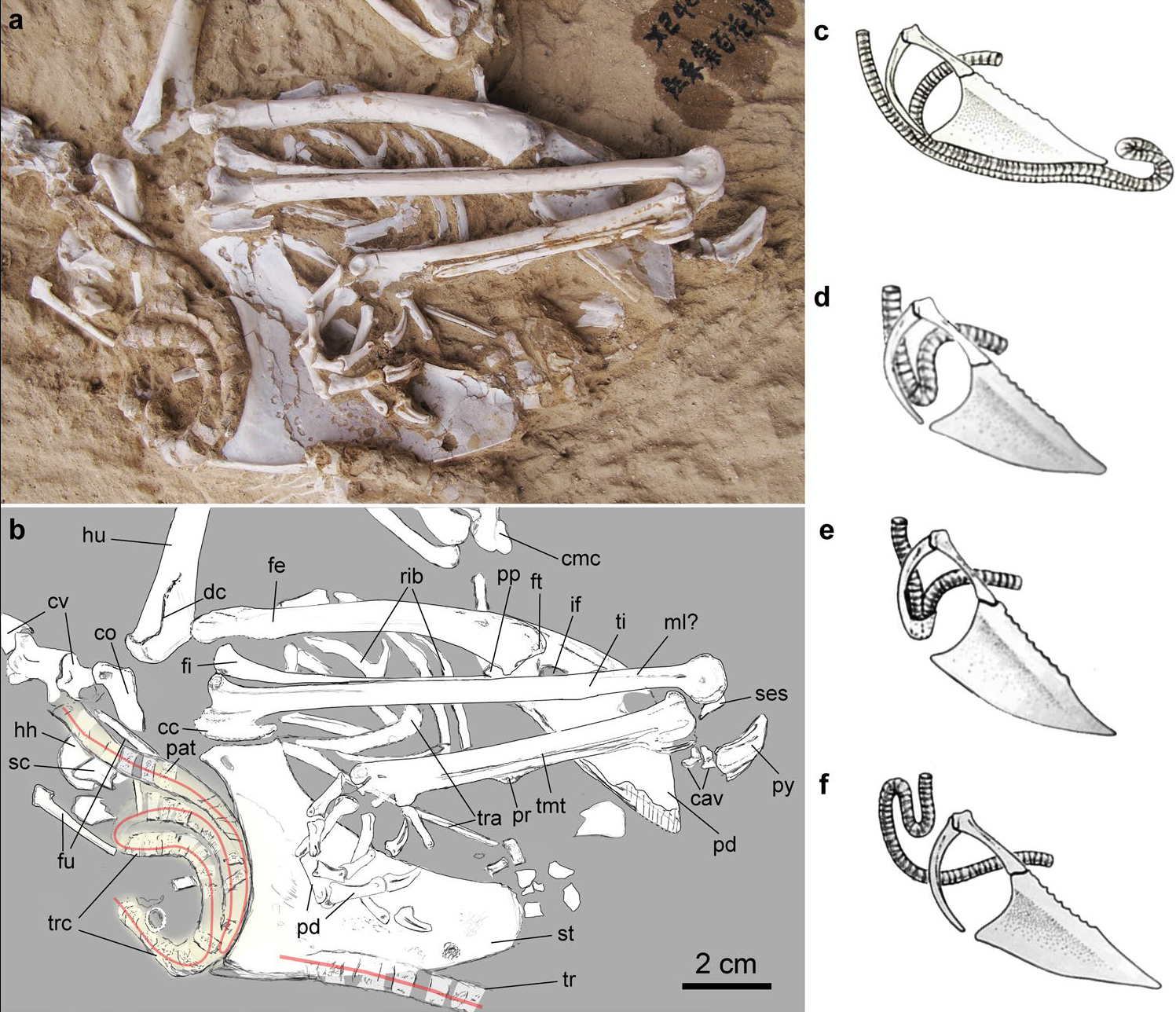
Thoracic region of the holotype, with diagram below showing the tracheal loop in red, and comparison with those of modern birds on the right

Within Phasianidae, Panraogallus was found to be most closely related to the extant genus Perdix and members of the subfamilies Phasianinae, Tetraoninae, and Meleagridinae. The elongation of the trachea is related to vocal modification, and has happened independently many times among birds, while Panraogallus is the first known pheasant with such an adaptation. The trachea of Panraogallus appears to have coiled twice outside its chest, and may have coiled back towards the chest, before going up to the chest cavity again where it attached to the lungs. The presence of this feature in Panraogallus indicates it has evolved more than one time independently within Galliformes, and does not appear to correlate with whether a galliform bird lived in open or closed habitat. Two extant phasianids are known with an elongated trachea, the western capercaillie and the rock ptarmigan.

The evolution of a tracheal loop has been proposed to help with "size exaggeration", where smaller birds can produce bigger sounds for signalling and communication. The coiled trachea of Panraogallus was possibly longer than its body, and it probably produced sounds with a lower frequency and with reduced harmonics, compared to pheasants of a similar size. Previously, other functions have been proposed for the presence of an elongated trachea, such as thermoregulation, but these are considered unlikely today. Since some features of the fossil are associated with sexual dimorphism, both the morphology and mechanism for vocalisation in Panraogallus may have evolved through Sexual selection. The avifauna known from the Miocene deposits of Gansu Province also includes an extinct kestrel, an ostrich, and Old World vultures. Other animals include rhinoceroses and three-toed horses.
