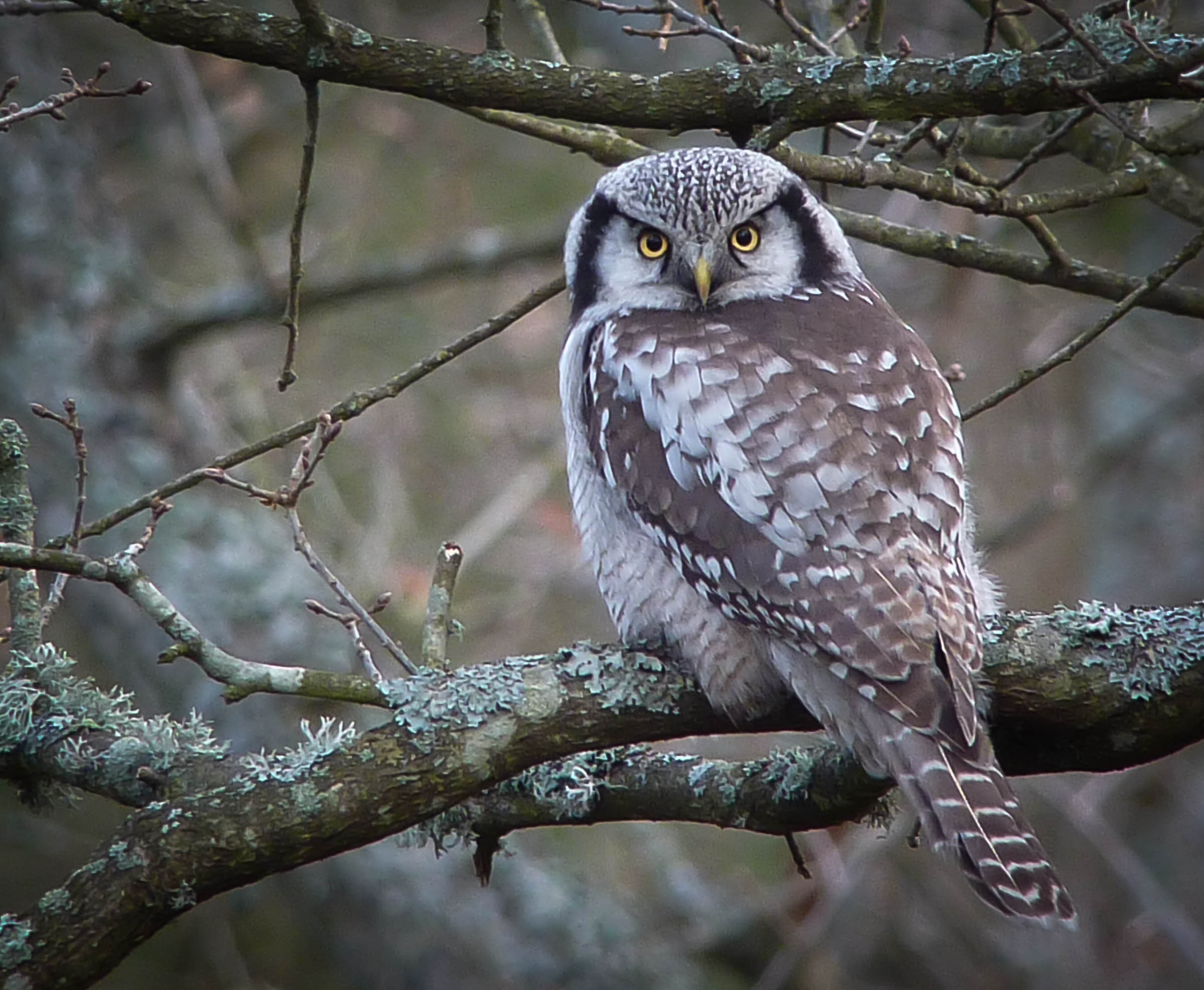
- Nominate S. u. ulula, Rockneby, Kalmar, Sweden

Conservation status
- Least Concern (IUCN 3.1)
- CITES Appendix II

Scientific classification
- Kingdom: Animalia
- Phylum: Chordata
- Class: Aves
- Order: Strigiformes
- Family: Strigidae
- Genus: Surnia; Duméril, 1805
- Species: S. ulula

Binomial name
- Surnia ulula (Linnaeus, 1758)
- Range of S. ulula Resident Non-breeding

Synonyms
- Strix ulula Linnaeus, 1758

= Northern hawk-owl =

Species of owl

The northern hawk-owl or northern hawk owl (Surnia ulula), is a medium-sized true owl of the northern latitudes. It is non-migratory and usually stays within its breeding range, though it sometimes irrupts southward. It is one of the few owls that is not strictly nocturnal nor crepuscular, often being active during the day. This is the only living species in the genus Surnia of the family Strigidae, the "typical" owls (as opposed to barn owls, Tytonidae). The species is sometimes called simply the hawk owl; however, many species of owls in the genus Ninox are also called "hawk owls".

== Taxonomy ==
The northern hawk-owl was formally described by the Swedish naturalist Carl Linnaeus in 1758 in the tenth edition of his Systema Naturae under the binomial name Strix ulula. The owl is now the only species placed in the genus Surnia that was introduced in 1805 by André Duméril. The type species was designated by George Robert Gray in 1840 as the northern hawk-owl. The genus name is of unknown etymology and may simply have been invented by Duméril. The specific epithet ulula is Latin for a "screech owl".

A molecular phylogenetic study of the owls published in 2019 found that the northern hawk-owl is sister to a clade containing the pygmy owls in the genus Glaucidium.

Three subspecies are recognised:

- S. u. tianschanica Smallbones, 1906 – central Asia to northern China and northern Mongolia
- S. u. ulula (Linnaeus, 1758) – northern Eurasia
- S. u. caparoch (P. L. S. Müller, 1776) – northern North America

== Description ==
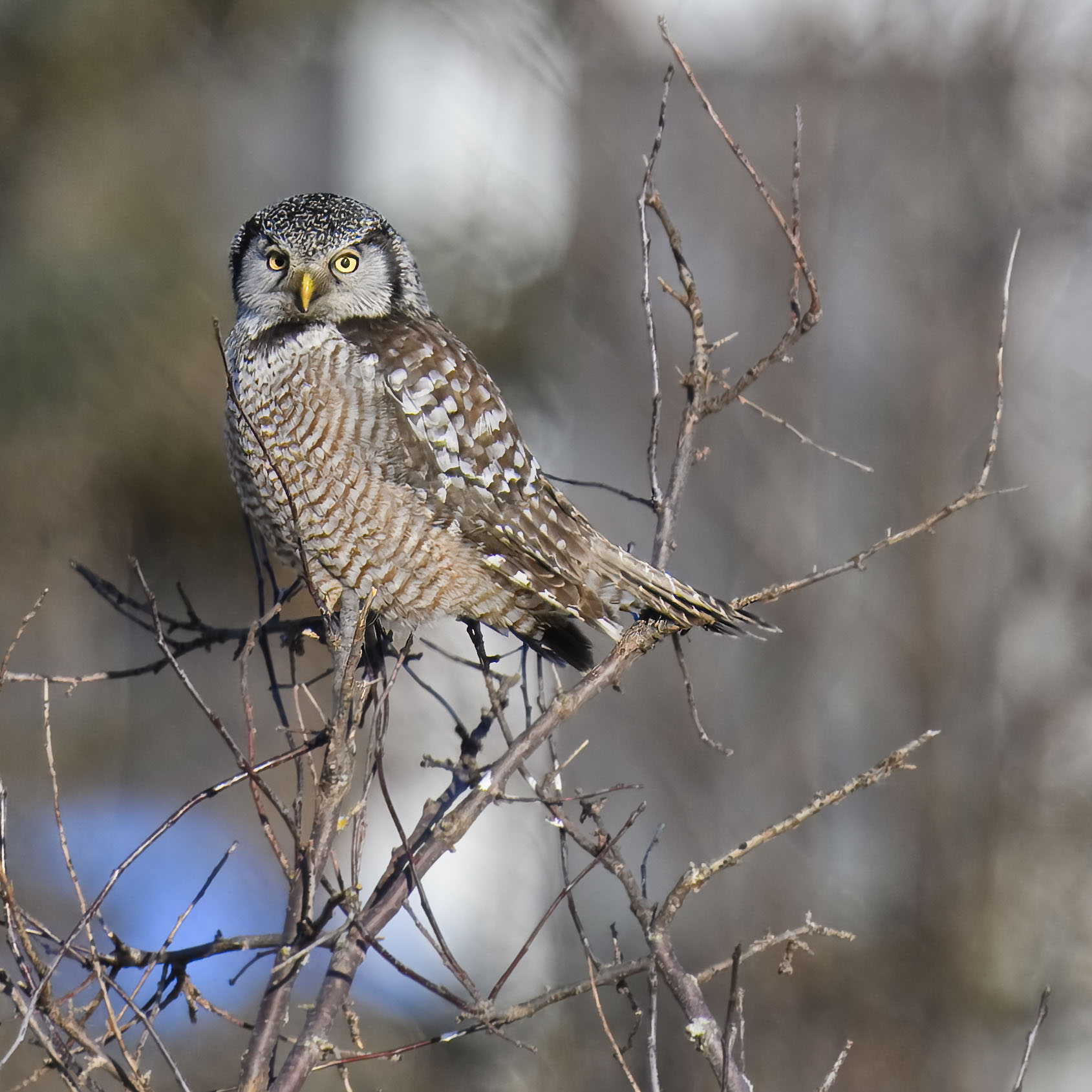
Subspecies S. u. caparoch, Sax-Zim Bog, Minnesota

Male northern hawk-owls are generally 35–42.5 cm (13.8–16.7 in) long, and weigh about 300 g (11 oz). Females are slightly bigger with a length of 37.2–44.7 cm (14.6–17.6 in) and a weight of about 340 g (12 oz). Both male and female have similar wingspans of about 69–82 cm (27–32 in). The plumage is relatively dark brown with an off-white spotting pattern on all dorsal parts of the body with the exception of the back of the neck which boasts a black v-shaped pattern. The underbelly is generally white or off-white which continues to the toes with brown bands on the breast and stomach. It also has a long tail with brown banding; the tail feather tips are rounded in adults, and pointed in first-year birds. The northern hawk-owl has a white face with a black border, a rounded head, yellow eyes and a curved yellow beak.

The subspecies vary in size and plumage tone; S. u. ulula has paler underparts with fine bars, while S. u. caparoch is browner below with heavier barring. S. u. tianschanica is marginally the largest, and darker above than the other two, but with intermediate barring below.

The northern hawk-owl resembles a hawk in appearance and in behaviour. In North America, its appearance in flight is often considered similar to a Cooper's hawk (Astur cooperii). It has been suggested that this may be because the hawk-owl may partially fill an important diurnal niche similar to that of day hunters such as hawks.

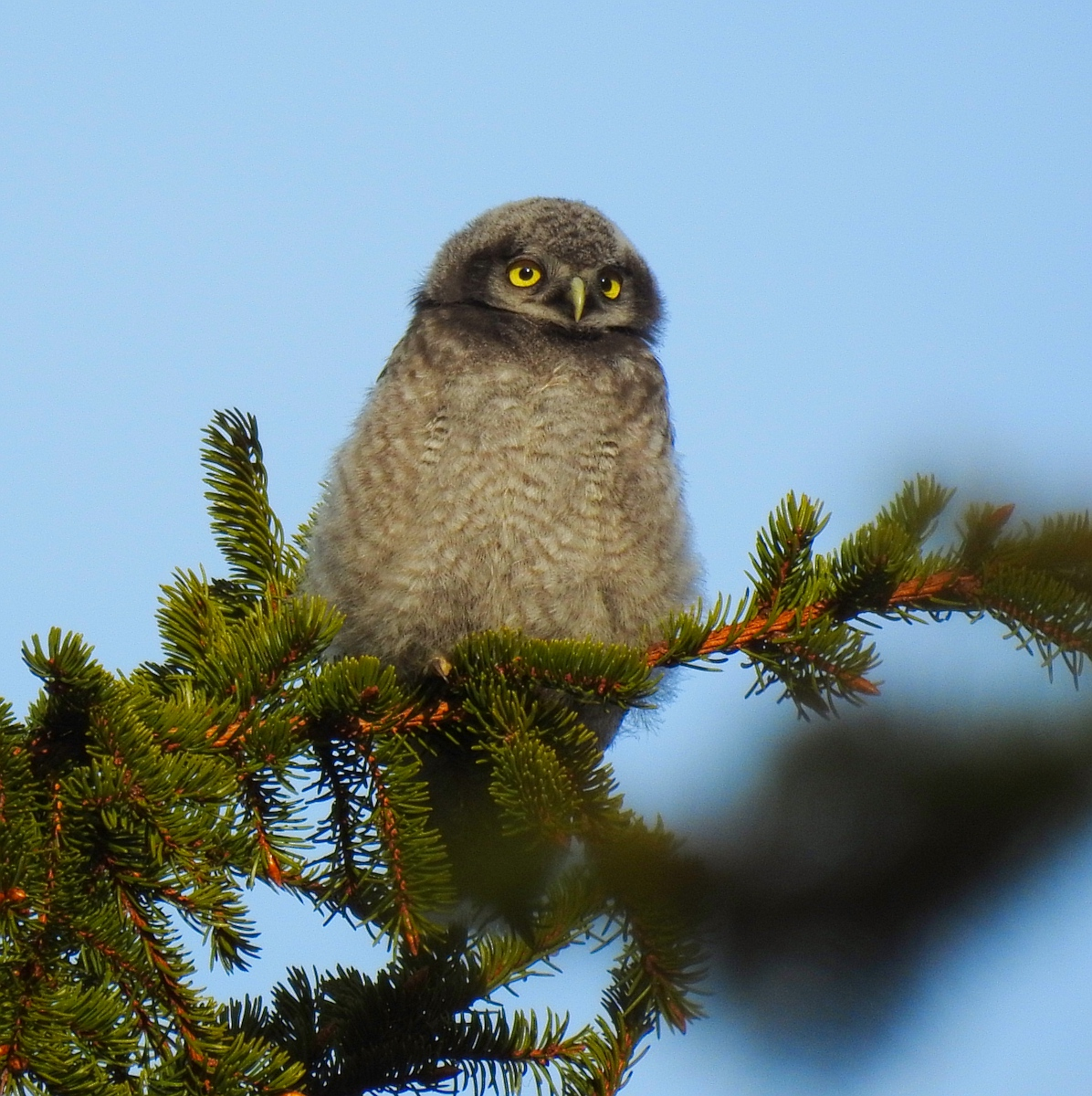
Recently fledged young, at Ammarnäs in northern Sweden

=== Vocalisation ===
Various calls are used by the different sexes in different situations. When attracting a mate the male usually lets out a rolled whistle of ulululululululul and a sound similar to tu-wita-wit, tiwita-tu-wita, wita, when perching at a potential nest site. The female's call is usually less constant and more shrill.

When alerting to danger, the northern hawk-owl lets out a sound similar to rike, rike, rike, rike. It also releases a high-pitched scream followed by a yip when an intruder is near to the nest. To warn of impending dangers to a fledgling, the hawk-owl will let out a noise similar to ki ki kikikikiki. Calls can vary in length from 15 seconds to 2 minutes.

== Distribution and habitat ==
Three subspecies exist across the northern Holarctic. The North American subspecies S. u. caparoch spans from eastern Alaska through Canada to Newfoundland and in some areas extends south into northern United States. The other two subspecies are found in northeastern Europe and Siberia: S. u. tianschanica breeds in Central Asia reaching Xinjiang (China); and S. u. ulula resides across Siberia reaching its most eastern range.

Occasionally, S. u. caparoch can extend its territory as far south as northern Minnesota and many other states in the northern United States including more central states such as West Virginia, New York, and South Dakota. These southern forays into the northern United States are rare and generally occur during winter, or following an explosion in a population of prey. S. u. ulula can occasionally be found in more southern areas such as Great Britain, southern Russia and Scandinavia, following explosions of prey.

Northern hawk-owls are unevenly distributed and highly variable throughout the boreal forest. They live mostly in open coniferous forests, or coniferous forests mixed with deciduous species such as larch, birch, poplar, and willow. They are found in muskegs, clearings, swamp valleys, meadows, or recently burnt areas, and generally avoid dense spruce-fir forests. Their winter habitat is usually the same as the breeding habitat.

== Behaviour and ecology ==
=== Breeding ===
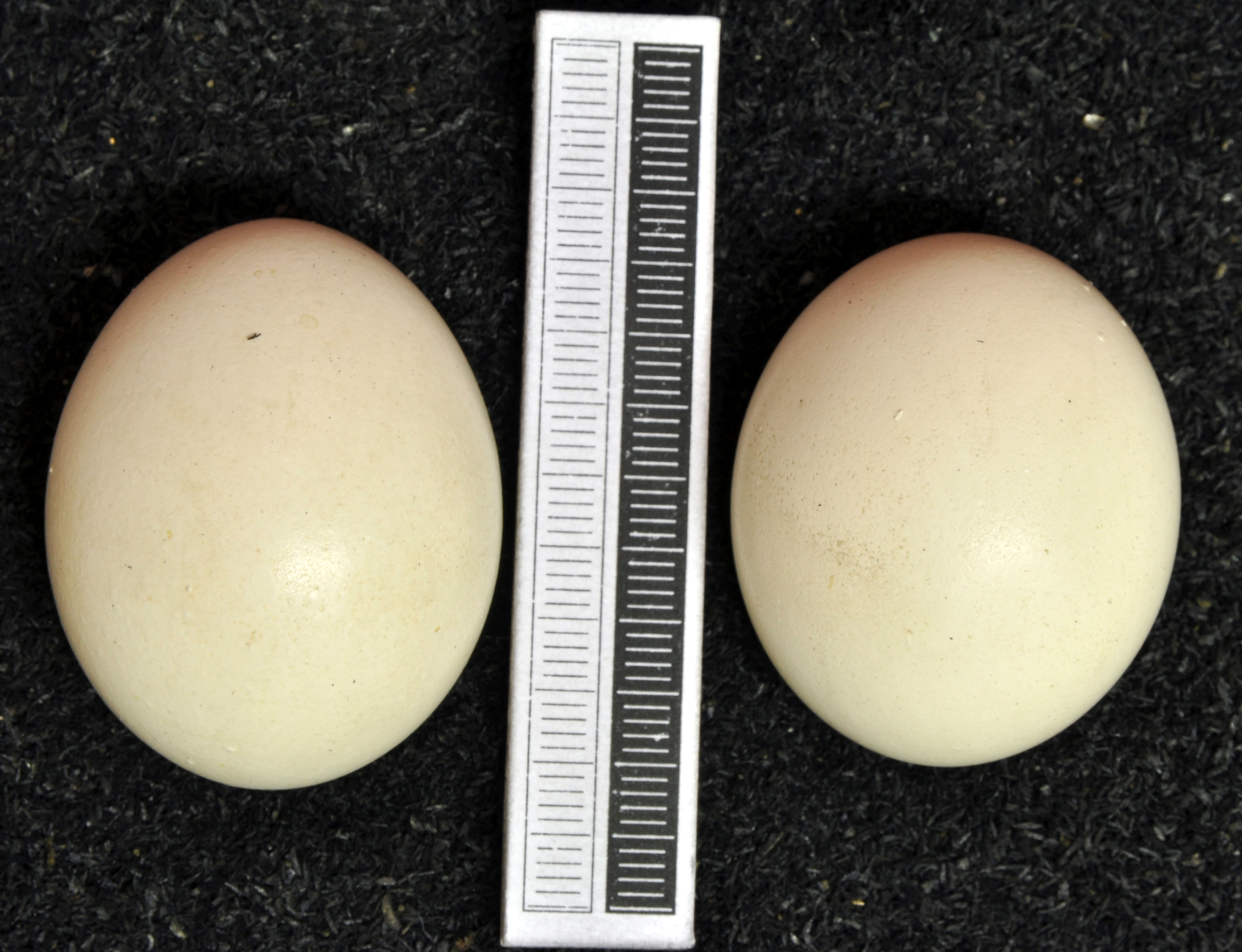
Eggs, Collection Museum Wiesbaden

The northern hawk-owl generally starts its mating rituals at the beginning of March. After calling and pairing is complete the northern hawk-owl will build a nest and start to lay eggs. On average the northern hawk-owl will lay 3–11 eggs per brood. The nest sites are usually the tops of hollow stumps of old dead spruce trees, but they have also been known to nest on cliffsides. These nesting sites are usually 2–10 m (6.6–32.8 ft) above ground for the North American S. u. caparoch and approximately 4–5 m (13–16 ft) above ground for the Eurasian S. u. ulula. The specific dates of egg appearance can be quite variable depending on locality. In central Canada eggs are usually laid from 30 March to 5 June. On Newfoundland the appearance of eggs occurs later, between 9 May and 11 June. In Finland, however, eggs can be found anywhere between 30 March to 23 June.

For the most part, the female northern hawk-owl does the incubating of the eggs, whilst the male forages for food. Once the chicks have hatched their roles shift drastically. At about two weeks into the chicks' lives, the female starts to leave the nest for long spans of time (5 hours or more). This span of time is presumably when the female hunts. The male, however, will guard the nest diligently until the chicks leave. When predators (usually other raptors) fly nearby, the male will sometimes chase them away from the nest if he feels it is necessary. Once the owlets have grown to a size which allows less parental supervision, they will leave the nest. This occurs on average after their 21st day, and can begin as early as mid-June. After this the female will provide most of the care. However, the male will remain close and will still feed his young on occasion.

It has little fear of humans and other potential predators, and will attack fiercely if the young are approached too closely; even animals as large as moose will be attacked if they are close to the young, and people finding recently-fledged young should move away and keep aware of the adults as they will attack.

== Food and feeding ==
The northern hawk-owl feeds on a variety of prey, which can include small rodents to mammals more robust in size, and a variety of birds — a typical diet for many boreal owls. In Eurasia the northern hawk-owl is known to feed primarily on Microtus voles. These voles usually follow a 3–4 year cycle of abundance. Therefore, S. u. ulula numbers are affected negatively when the numbers of voles are lowest. In North America the subspecies S. u. caparoch also feeds upon microtine voles, but its population is primarily based on the ten-year cycling of the snowshoe hare (Lepus americanus). In Eurasia the northern hawk-owl's biomass consists of about 94% microtine voles, whereas in North America the percentage of biomass contributed by voles can be as low as 20%. Juvenile hares are considerably more important at 40–50%.

Other animals that are important prey items for the northern hawk-owl include the red squirrel (Sciurus vulgaris) which has been documented to contribute as much as 20% to the hawk-owl's biomass. A long list of others includes mice, rats, voles, lemmings, cottontails, shrews, moles, the short-tail weasel (Mustela erminea), partridge, spruce grouse (Canachites canadensis), doves, pileated woodpeckers (Dryocopus pileatus), sparrows, jays, robins, starlings, buntings, grackles, and finches. Frogs and even fish are sometimes taken. In the winter, feeding strategies change; where in summer the main source of food is mammals, in the winter a bigger portion of the hawk-owl's prey biomass consists of ground-dwelling birds, such as ptarmigan and grouse.

The northern hawk-owl is a partially diurnal hunter, although it has been recorded hunting at varying times and does not appear to have a preferred hunting time. Whether the bird resides in Eurasia or North America, the strategy is usually similar. The northern hawk-owl will perch and scour the immediate area for prey. As these owls are considered a search-oriented species, they likely do not stay put for long if the site is not producing prey. The hawk-owl prefers open, forest-type environments when perching. These environments include sphagnum bogs and partially deforested areas. The preferred perching tree of the northern hawk-owl is the spruce tree. When the hawk-owl attacks, it goes from a horizontal posture into a gliding dive. If the prey is further away, the bird will flap its wings a few times during the dive to increase distance. The hawk-owl has exceptional hearing and can plunge into snow to capture rodents below the surface.

The type of prey the hawk-owl catches will determine its eating strategy. For mammalian prey the ritual is generally the same: the northern hawk-owl will eviscerate its prey, eat the head first (especially for prey like the red squirrel, whose head is fairly large), and then, when tackling larger prey, it will eat the organs and cache the remains; with smaller prey, the owl will simply swallow the body whole.

== Conservation and status ==
Due to its low density occurrence, sporadic fluctuations, and remote breeding locations, the northern hawk-owl is one of the least studied and poorly understood birds in North America. As a result, it is almost impossible to properly estimate its numbers.

In Yukon, northern hawk-owl densities were estimated to be between zero and six pairs per 100 km^{2} (39 sq mi). Despite these low densities, the North American population is thought to be fairly large given that they occur throughout the boreal forest. Duncan and Harris (1997) estimated that this population contains between 10,000 and 50,000 pairs.

Populations are known to fluctuate with cycles of small rodents and irruptions are known to occur in sub-boreal regions throughout the world. In Scandinavia, populations have been reported to vary from a few hundred birds in certain years to over 4000 birds in others and even up to 10,000 breeding pairs in optimal years. Irruptions can be used as indicators of small mammal abundance and in eastern North America, southern irruptions have been linked with low densities of red-backed voles in the high boreal forest.

In North America, over 50% of the northern hawk-owls' breeding territory occurs in non-commercial boreal forests and as long as nothing threatens their northern habitats, no known factors challenge their existence. However, it is unknown what effects modern forestry would have on population levels because although it would decrease nesting localities, it would simultaneously create ideal habitat for Microtus prey. Fire suppression by humans is believed to negatively affect northern hawk-owl populations by reducing open areas for hunting and dead wood to nest in.

The status and conservation of this species is uncertain. A report by the Committee On the Status of Endangered Wildlife In Canada (COSEWIC) recommended that no designation be assigned for the northern hawk-owl. Compared to the nineteenth century, southern irruptions in the New and Old World appear to have declined. Also, North American populations seem to be declining, although no proper documentation exists to confirm this trend. In Canada, it was ranked 85th overall to set conservation, research, or monitoring priorities. Downes et al. (2000) considered the hawk-owl to be of medium concern, but with a high priority to improve monitoring.

== In falconry ==
The northern hawk-owl is considered a falconry bird in Ontario, and may be used to hunt small game with a proper license.
