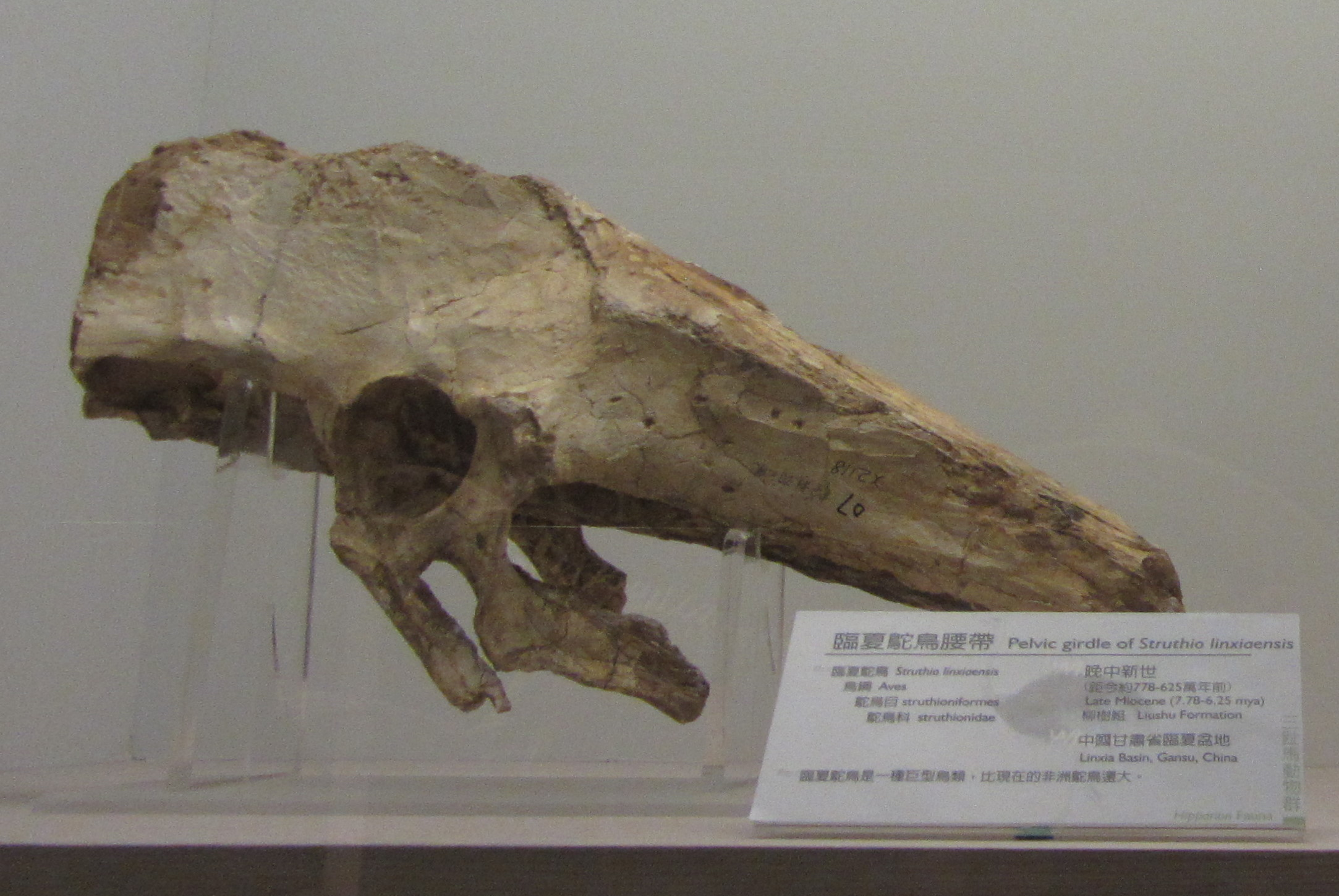
- Pelvic girdle of Orientornis linxiaensis

Scientific classification
- Kingdom: Animalia
- Phylum: Chordata
- Class: Aves
- Infraclass: Palaeognathae
- Order: Struthioniformes
- Family: Struthionidae
- Genus: †Orientornis; Wang, 2008

Type species
- †Orientornis linxiaensis (Hou et al., 2005)

Synonyms
- Struthio linxiaensis Hou et al., 2005

= Orientornis =

Orientornis Temporal range: Late Miocene

Extinct species of bird

Orientornis is an extinct species of ratite from the Miocene of China.

== Description ==
Remains of a pelvis, including a synsacrum, were recovered from mudstone in the Linxia Basin, Guanghe County, Gansu Province, northwest China. Based on the size of these remains, it is believed to have been slightly larger than Struthio camelus. When this bird lived, the area is believed to have been either open grasslands or wetlands.

== Taxonomy ==
Orientornis was originally named as a species of Struthio, S. linxiaensis, by Hou et al. (2005). However, Wang (2008) placed the taxon in its own genus, Orientornis.

Mikhailov and Zelenkov (2020) have disputed the validity of this genus, treating Orientornis as a junior synonym of Struthio, and noting that a direct comparison with Struthio wimani is required, as both taxa may represent the same species.
