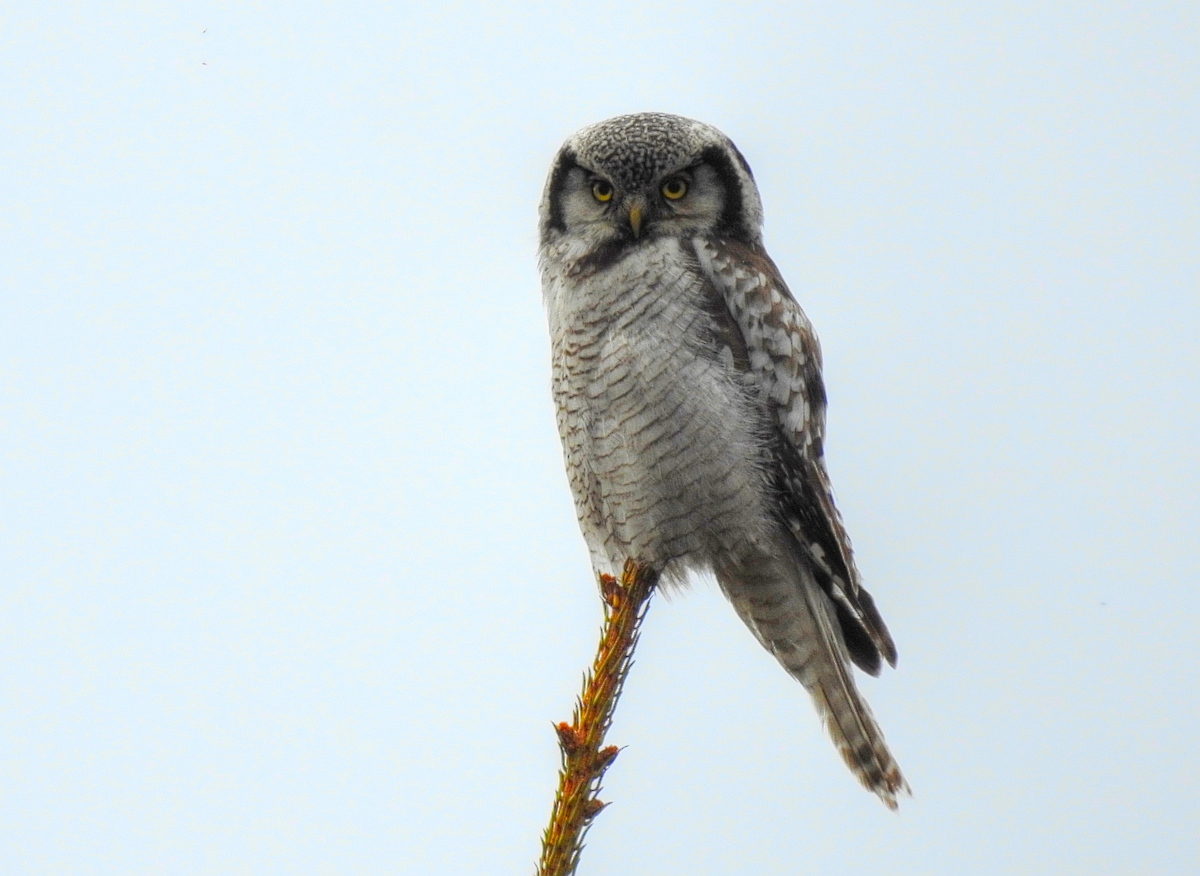
- Northern hawk-owl (Surnia ulula)

Scientific classification
- Kingdom: Animalia
- Phylum: Chordata
- Class: Aves
- Order: Strigiformes
- Family: Strigidae
- Genus: Surnia; Duméril, 1805

Species
- Surnia ulula; †Surnia capeki; †Surnia robusta

= Surnia =

Surnia Temporal range: Pliocene - Recent

Genus of owl

Surnia is a genus of owl that contains a single living species, the northern hawk-owl (Surnia ulula).

Two fossil species are known as well; Surnia capeki and Surnia robusta, both from the Plio-Pleistocene of Europe.
