= Avibase =

Taxonomic database for birds

- Website type: Taxonomic database
- Available in: 104 languages
- Creator: Denis Lepage
- Website: avibase.bsc-eoc.org
- Launched: 2003
- Current status: Active

Avibase is an online taxonomic database that organizes bird taxonomic and distribution data globally. The database relies on the notion of taxonomic concepts rather than taxonomic names. Avibase incorporates and organizes taxonomic data from the main avian taxonomic publishers (The Clements Checklist of Birds of the World, Handbook of the Birds of the World, BirdLife International, IOC Checklist and the Howard and Moore Complete Checklist of the Birds of the World) and other regional sources (e.g. all editions of the American Ornithological Society Checklist of North American Birds since 1886). Taxonomic concepts in over 230 different taxonomic sources have been mapped and cross-referenced to Avibase concepts.

The website also offers checklists for more than 20,000 geographic regions of the world, species pages with taxonomic information and synonyms, and tools for observers to maintain their own sightings and obtain reports, such as a map showing countries or eBird hotspots with target species.

== History and purpose ==
Avibase was created and is maintained by Denis Lepage, currently senior director, data science and technology at Birds Canada. The data contained in Avibase has been gathered starting around 1991. The Avibase website was launched in June 2003 and has been hosted by Birds Canada (formerly Bird Studies Canada) since its inception.

== Features ==
Taxonomic concepts. The database is organized primarily around a table of unique taxonomic concepts. A taxonomic concept is a way of grouping similar taxa together in a database in a more flexible way as compared to specific species names. Each concept represents a unique biological circumscription and has been assigned a unique alphanumeric ID called Avibase ID. Avibase IDs allow the tracking of congruent taxonomic concepts among publication sources. There are approximately 58,000 unique taxonomic concepts described in Avibase. These include concepts traditionally recognized as species and subspecies, but also other taxonomic groupings (subspecies groups), various alternative taxonomic treatments recognized historically, and other concepts representing hybrids, color morphs and invalid or dubious forms.

Nomenclature data. Each scientific name is described to include citation data and the name associated with the original description. Approximately 87,000 scientific names have been recorded in Avibase, and various types of synonyms are also available.

Regional species checklists are available for more than 20,000 regions of the world. This includes all countries, territories and dependencies, and most regions defined in the GADM subnational layers such as provinces, states, prefectures, counties, departments, municipalities and districts (GADM levels 1 and 2), as well as over 2,500 islands. Regional checklists are available in several taxonomic formats and can incorporate common names in a variety of languages. Data for regional checklists originates from multiple of sources, such as the eBird EBD dataset and forums such as the Facebook Global Rare Bird Alert.

Common names and synonyms are available in 271 different languages and regional variants, and there are 21 languages that have a coverage greater than 85% of species with a known common name.

MyAvibase, launched in 2013, provides free tools for users to maintain their life lists and generate reports that are focused on finding target species that the observer has not yet seen, or general regional statistics (e.g. total number of species by country).
