= Regions of Peru (disambiguation) =

There are several types of regions in Peru:

- Regions of Peru
- Regional Governments of Peru
- Former regions of Peru
- Natural regions of Peru
