= Omagua =

Natural region of Peru; low jungle

Omagua or low jungle (selva baja or partially tierra caliente) is one of the eight natural regions of Peru. It is located between 80 and 400m above sea level in the Peruvian Amazonia (Amazon rainforest). In this region, there are a lot of rivers that create meanders, swamps and lagoons.

The flora includes trees like cedro and palms (e.g. genus Phytelephas, tucumo (Astrocaryum aculeatum), shapaja (Attalea phalerata) and shebo (Attalea butyracea)). There are also plants like the Cattleya rex, a species of orchid.

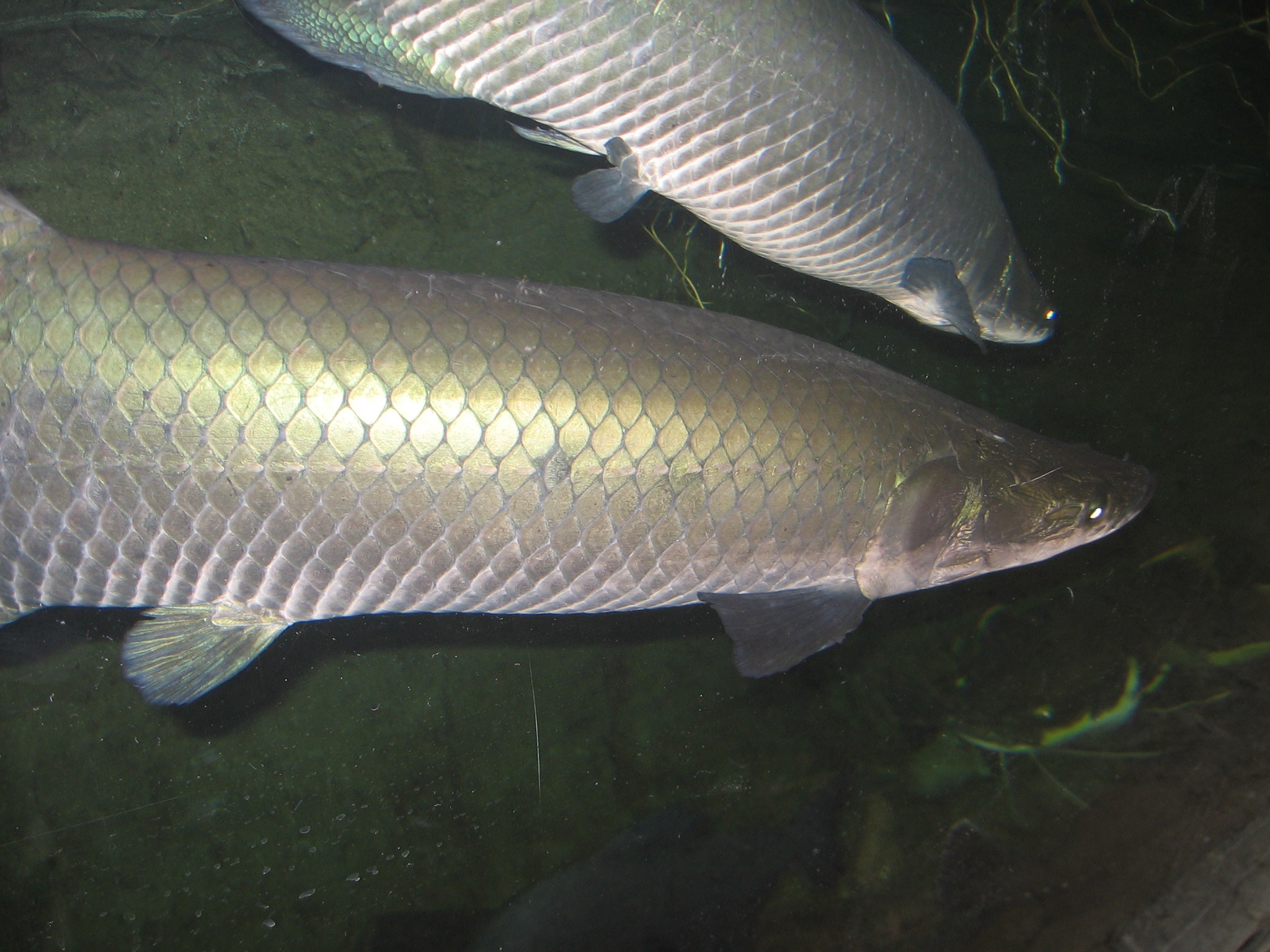
The arapaima, locally known as paiche, a fish found in the rivers of the Amazon.

The fauna includes animals like the capybara (which is the biggest rodent in the world), the giant armadillo, the jaguar, the giant otter, and the red brocket deer. There are also numerous species of birds, including the white-throated toucan, the hoatzin, the jabiru, and the red-and-green macaw. Animals that live in the water include the paiche, the Amazonian manatee and pipa toads.

== Overview ==
=== Andean Continental Divide ===
Westside	Eastside
Chala, dry coast	Lowland tropical rainforest or Selva baja
Maritime Yungas	Highland tropical rainforest or Selva alta
Maritime Yungas	Subtropical cloud forest or Fluvial Yungas
Quechua - Montane valleys	Quechua - Montane valleys
Tree line	Tree line - about 3,500 m
Suni, scrubs and agriculture	Suni, scrubs and agriculture

=== Mountain top ===
- Mountain passes - 4,100 m
- Puna grassland
- Andean-alpine desert
- Snow line - about 5,000 m
- Janca - rocks, snow and ice
- Peak

== See also ==
- Climate zones by altitude
- Altitudinal zonation
