= Life zones of Peru =

Ecological divisions of Peru

When the Spanish arrived, they divided Peru into three main regions: the coastal region (11.6% of Peru), that is bounded by the Pacific Ocean; the highlands (28.1% of Peru), that is located on the Andean Heights, and the jungle, that is located on the Amazonian Jungle (Climate of Peru). But Javier Pulgar Vidal (es), a geographer who studied the biogeographic reality of the Peruvian territory for a long time, proposed the creation of eight Natural Regions. In 1941, he presented his thesis "Las Ocho Regiones Naturales del Perú" at the III General Assembly of the Pan-American Institute of Geography and History.

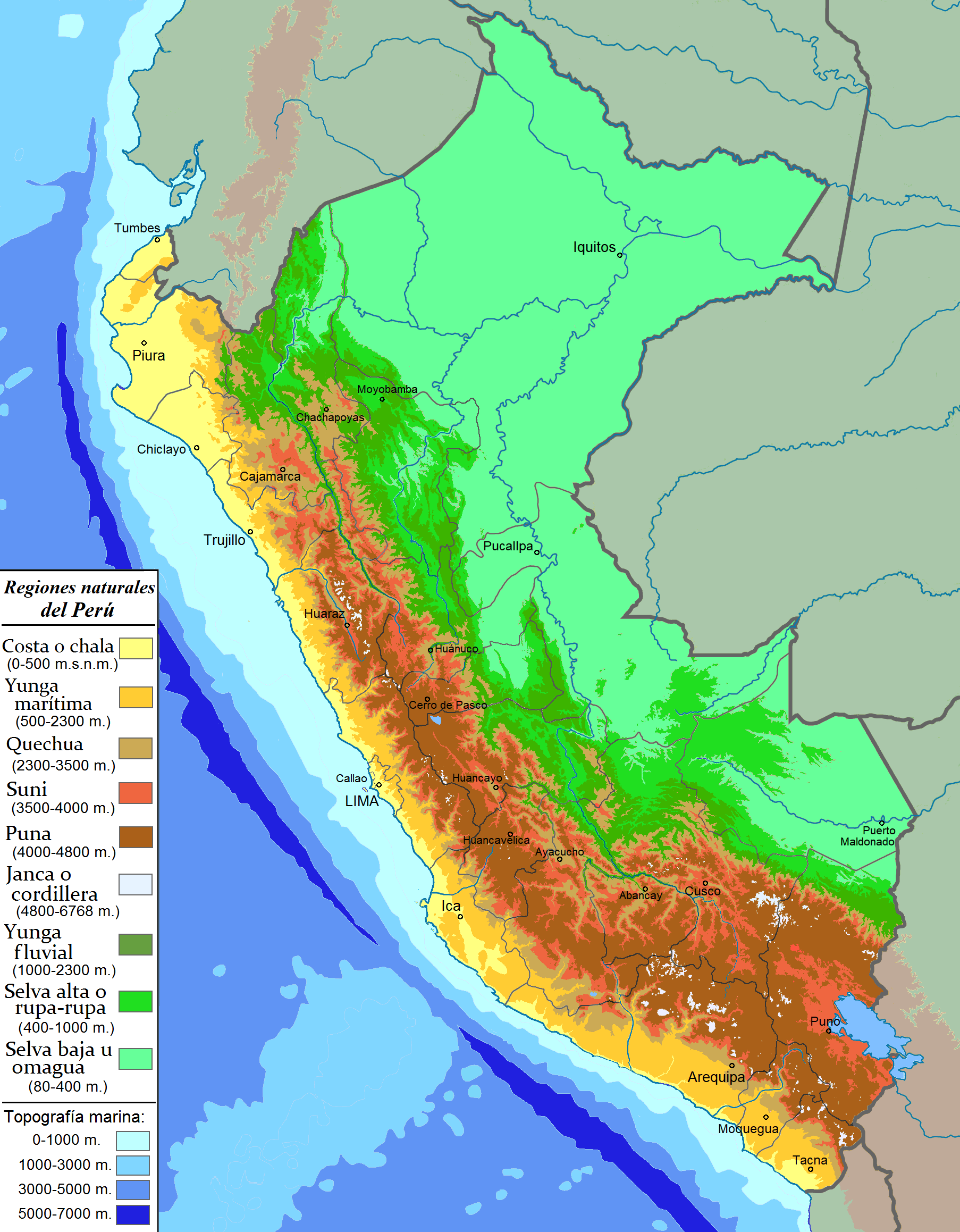
Peruvian natural regions.

These eight Peruvian regions are:

- Chala or Coast (subtropical dry and tropical savanna)
- Yungas
  - Fluvial Yunga
  - Loma-Vegetation
- Quechua
- Suni or Jalca
- Puna
- Janca
- Rupa - Rupa or Highland Jungle
- Omagua or Lowland Jungle

== Example: Andes 10°S ==
See also Altitudinal zonation

=== Classic version, Amazonic side ===
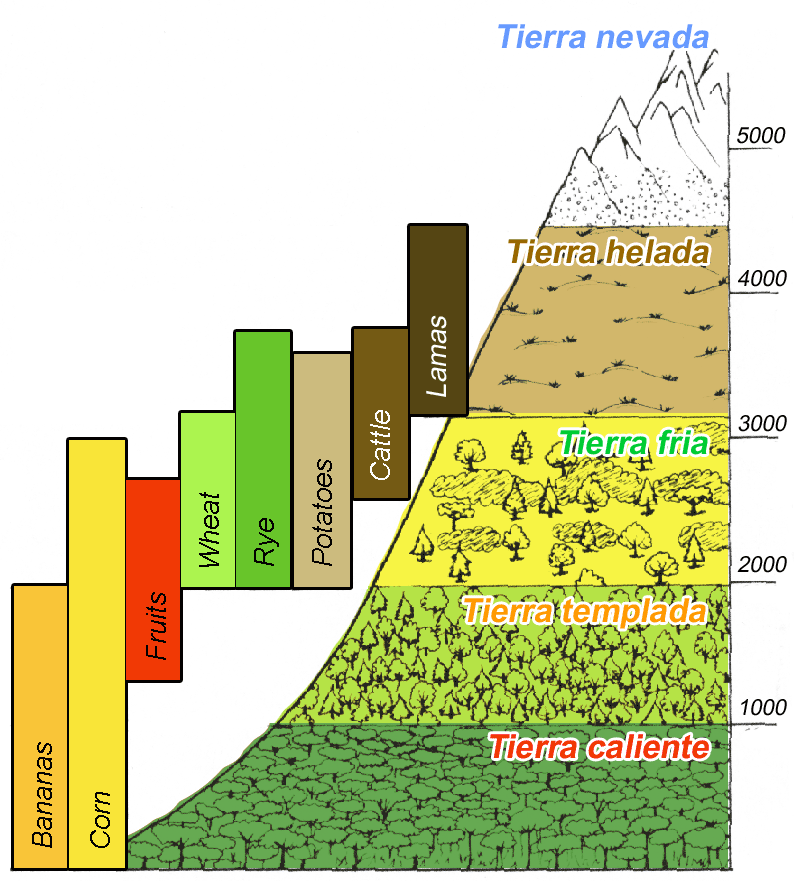
Altitudinal variation in the Andes.

- Sea level
  - Estimated 22 - 24°C (75°F), but the cold Humboldt Current generates fog on the coast side
- Tierra caliente (Hot land, tropical) up to 2,500 ft (about 750 m - 1,000 m).
  - Crops: Cacao, Banana, Sugarcane, Manioc, Sweet Potatoes, Yams.
- Tierra templada (Temperate land, subtropical) up to 6,000 ft (about 1,850 m – 2,000 m)
  - The warmest month has an average temperature of below 22°C or 72°F.
  - Crops: Coffee, Tobacco, Maize, Coca, Peruvian Pepper (Schinus molle), Avocado, Guave (Psidium guajava), Cherimoya, Plum, Citrus fruits.
- Tierra fría (Cool land, temperate) below 12,000 ft (about 3,600 m, treeline)
  - The warmest month has an average temperature of below 18°C or 64°F.
  - Crops: Potato, Maize, Squash, Passionfruit, Papaya, Peach, Wheat, Rye, and Barley. Farming of cattle.
- Tierra helada (Cold land) above 12,000 ft (about 3,600 m)
  - The definition of treeline of Coniferae: the warmest month has an average temperature of below 10°C or 50°F ).
  - Crops above tree line: Quinoa, Cañigua, Mashua, Oca, Tarhui, Broad beans and Ulluco. Farming of Sheep, Llamas and Alpacas.
  - Terrestrial Biome Type 10: Montane grasslands and shrublands
- Tierra Nevada (Janca), above the snow line, 15,000 ft (about 4,500 m - 5,000 m)
  - Just warmer than -1°C over rocks or just warmer than -3°C over snow, annual mean temperature).

=== Javier Pulgar Vidal's version ===
The Peruvian geographer Javier Pulgar Vidal divided Peru in 8 regions (traditionally, it was costa, sierra and selva):

Map from República del Perú - Instituto Geográfico Nacional

- Chala (West, Pacific Coast) 0– 500 m
- Omagua (Lowland jungle or Selva baja, Amazonic rainforest) 80– 400 m
- Rupa-Rupa (Highland jungle, Selva alta) 400– 1,000 m
- Yungas (Aymaran for "Warm Lands", Cloud forest)
  - Loma-Vegetation (West, "Yunga coastal" at the north of Peru) 450– 600 m
  - Fluvial Yungas (East, "Yunga fluvial") 1,000- 2,300 m
- Quechua (East, High valleys) 2,300– 3,500 m
- Suni (or Jalca or Sallqa too, high plateaus and cliffs) 3,500– 4,100 m
- Puna (means "mountain top") 4,100– 4,800 m
- Janca (means white) above 4,800 m, permafrost, rocks, snow and ice

=== Notes ===
- Biomes & Ecoregions nearby:

Tropical and subtropical moist broadleaf forests

- Bolivian Yungas
- Peruvian Yungas
- Southwest Amazon moist forests

Montane grasslands and shrublands

- Central Andean dry puna
- Central Andean puna
- Central Andean wet puna

Deserts and xeric shrublands

- Atacama Desert
- Sechura Desert

=== Overview - Amazonic side ===
- Mouth of the Amazon River, Atlantic Ocean
  - Belém, Brazil, 24 m, annual mean temperature 26.0°C
  - Gurupa várzea (NT0126)
  - Manaus, Brazil, 72 m, annual mean temperature 26.6°C
  - Monte Alegre várzea (NT0141)
  - Purus várzea (NT0156)
- Colombia - Peru - Brazil border
  - Leticia, Colombia, 84 m, annual mean temperature 25.8°C
  - Tierra Caliente or Tropical rainforest
    - Omagua or Selva baja (Southwest Amazon moist forests - NT0166)
    - Iquitos, Peru, 126 m, annual mean temperature 26.2°C
    - Rupa-Rupa or Selva alta (Iquitos várzea - NT0128)
  - Yunga fluvial (more than 5°C colder than the Peruan Tropics)
    - Peruvian Yungas (NT0153)
  - Quechua (High valleys, more than 10°C colder than the Peruan Tropics)
- Tree line
  - Tierra Helada
    - Suni (plateau)
- Mountain pass
  - Puna (mountain slope)
    - Central Andean wet puna (NT1003)
    - Central Andean puna (NT1002)
  - "Andean-Alpine desert"
- Snow line
  - Tierra Nevada or Janca
- Peak

==== Estimated temperatures - Continental Divide ====
Explanations:

- Region, elevation (m); avg annual precipitation (mm); avg annual temperature (°C);
- Peruvian Highland Rainforest (Tropical climate), Cloud forest (Subtropical climate) and Temperate forest (Temperate climate);
- Cusco reference, estimated avg annual temperature (°C, Lowland Rainforest or Selva baja gets more rain, so it is more cloudy, so it is cooler);
- Snow line reference, Humboldt cold current/ Pacific climate influence, estimated avg annual temperature (°C).
  - Cuzco, Peru; 3,249 m; avg annual temperature 12.5 °C; avg annual precipitation 736 mm.
  - Lima, Peru; 30 m; avg annual temperature 19.2 °C (fog influence); avg annual precipitation 15 mm.

	Elevation	West - Pacific side	East - Amazonian side
Highland Rainforest or Selva alta	400 m	-	26.5 °C
Loma-Vegetation	500 m	about 21.1 °C	-
Cloud forest or Fluvial Yunga	1,000 m	-	23.5 °C
Quechua - Montane Valleys	2,300 m	-	17.2 °C
Amazonian Tree line of Coniferae: 10 °C	about 3,500 m	-	about 10 °C
Mountain pass influence	4,100 m	about 3.4 °C	(about 7.1 °C)
Vegetation end	about 4,800 m	about 0.0 °C	-
Snow line	about 5,000 m	about -1.0 °C	-

== Example: Kallawaya Region, Bolivia ==
Altitudinal zonation: Kallawaya Region, around Charazani, Bolivia (border to Peru).

- Glacier
  - Elevation: 5,900- 5,200 m, Annual mean temperature: below 0 °C, Agriculture: none
- High Mountain Desert, Werneria ciliolata on scree
  - Elevation: 5,200- 5,000 m, Annual mean temperature: below 0 °C - 0 °C, Agriculture: none.
- Grass Zone
  - Calamagrostis minima Steppe,
    - Elevation: 5,000- 4,600 m, Annual mean temperature: 0- 3.5 °C, Farming: alpacas, lamas.
  - Pycnophyllum Steppe,
    - Elevation: 4,600- 4,300 m, Annual mean temperature: 3.5- 7.5 °C, Farming: alpacas, lamas.
  - Aciachne Humid Grassland,
    - Elevation: 4,300- 3,900 m, Annual mean temperature: 7.5- 10.0 °C, Farming: alpacas, lamas, pigs; Agriculture: bitter potatoes, (oca), (oat); Fallow land: more than 8 years.
- Shrub Zone
  - Satureja Shrub (westslope), Baccharis pentandii Shrub, with Berberis (eastslope),
    - Elevation: 3,900- 3,600 m, Annual mean temperature: 10.0- 11.5 °C, Farming: sheep; Agriculture: potatoes, oca, ulluco, barley; Fallow land: 3 to 4 years.
  - Mutisia Shrub (westslope), Baccharis pentlandii Shrub, with Siphocampylus (eastslope),
    - Elevation: 3,600- 2,700 m, Annual mean temperature: 11.5- 16.5 °C, Farming: sheep, cattle; Agriculture: wheat (barley), peas, beans, maize up to 3,500 m with crop rotation.
  - Kaunia longipetiolata Shrub,
    - Elevation: 3,200- 2,700 m, Annual mean temperature: 13.5- 16.5 °C, Farming: cattle; Agriculture: maize, wheat, beans, spring potatoes, use of fertilizers, no crop rotation.
  - Highland Rainforest,
    - Elevation: below 2,700 m, Annual mean temperature: over 17.0 °C, Farming: cattle; Agriculture: tropical fruits, oranges, coffee, coca at around 2,000 m.

== Gallery ==
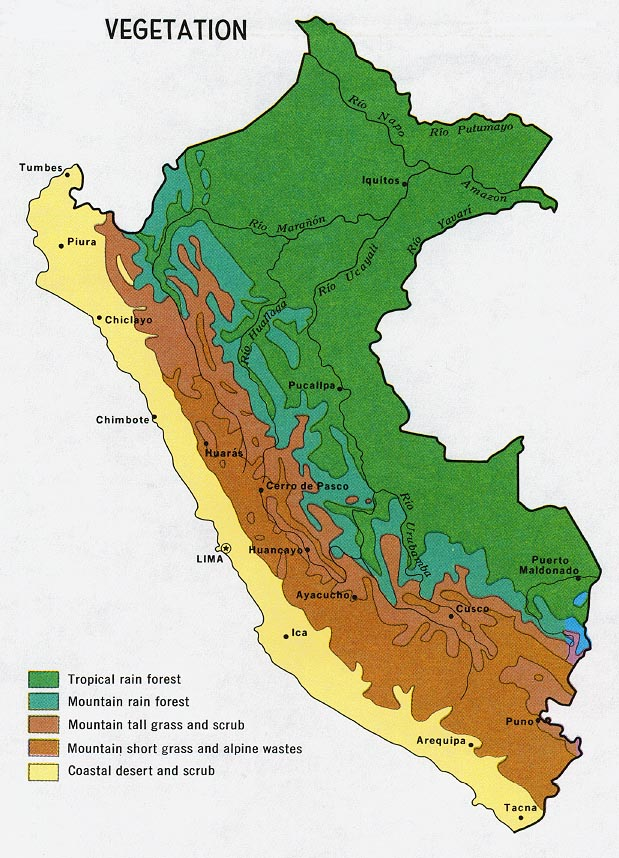
Vegetation of Peru

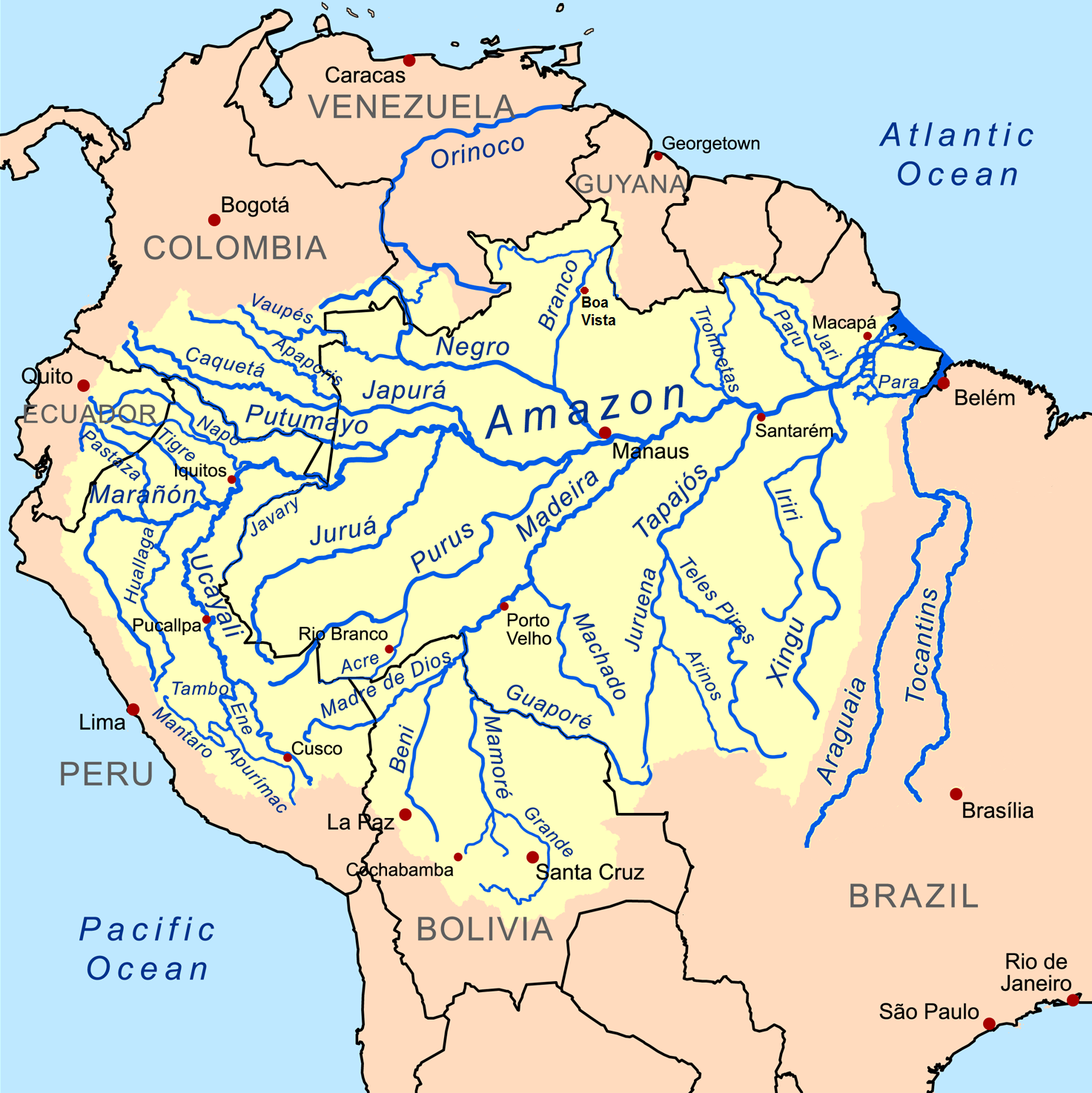
Amazon basin

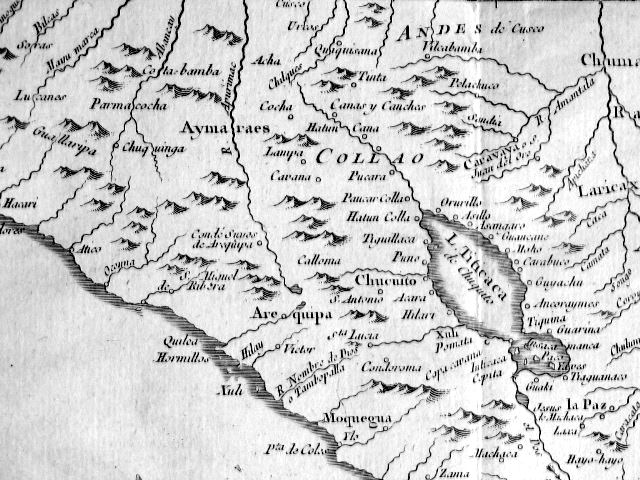
Watershed around Lake Titicaca, Arequipa, Puno and Cusco

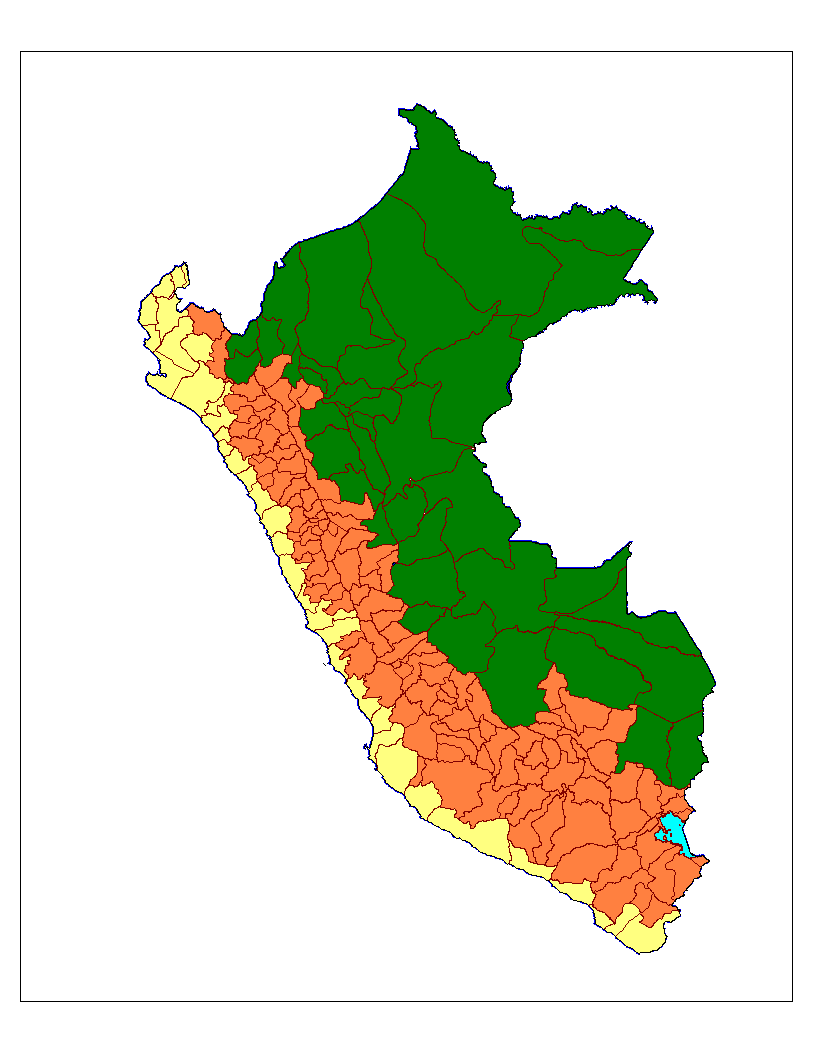
Costa - Sierra - Selva

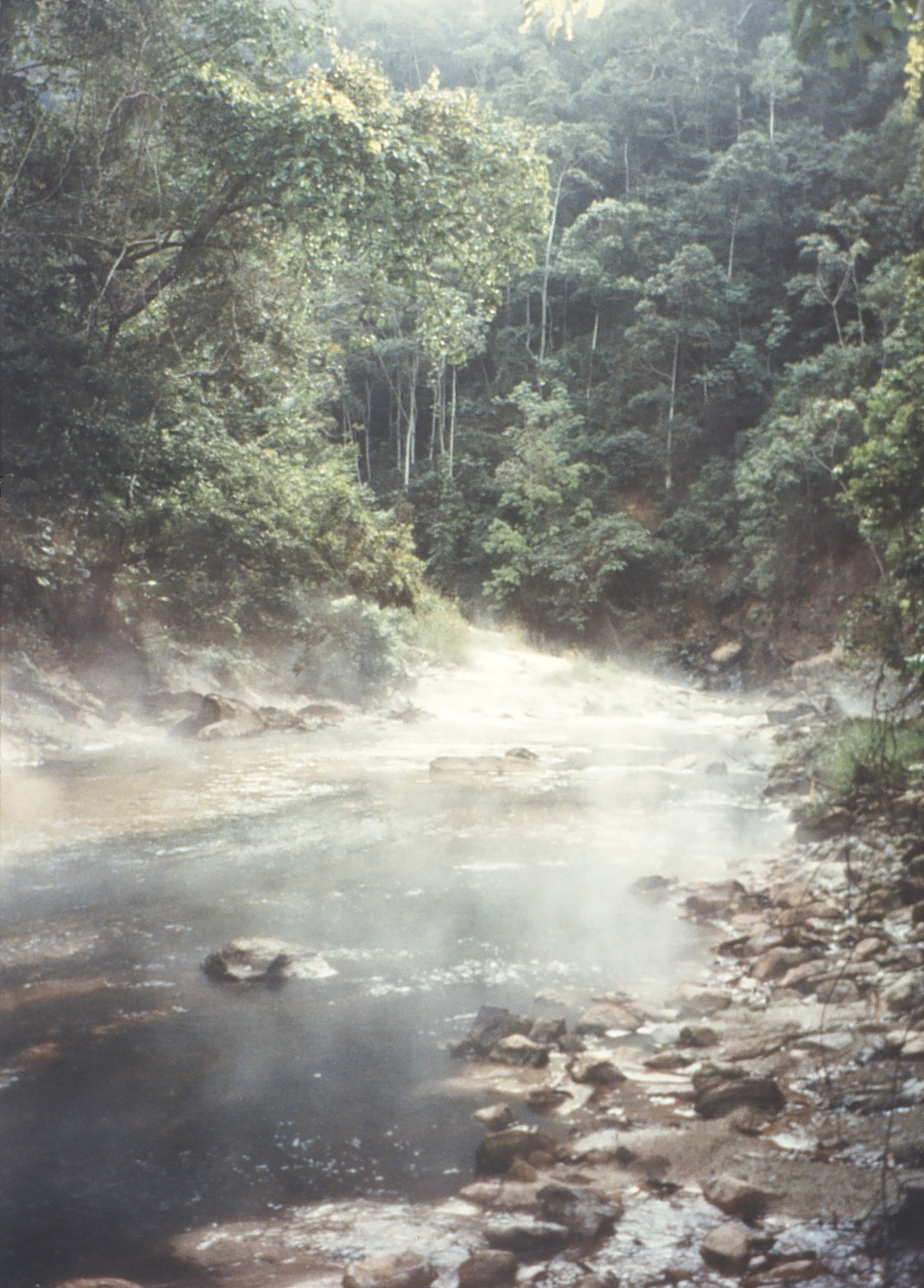
Rupa-Rupa - High Rain forest

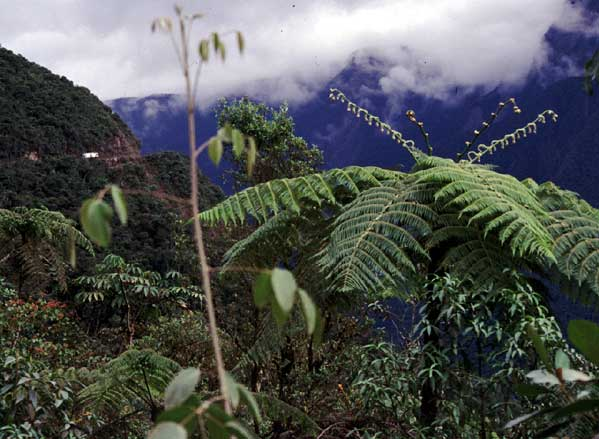
Mist forest (2,500 m)

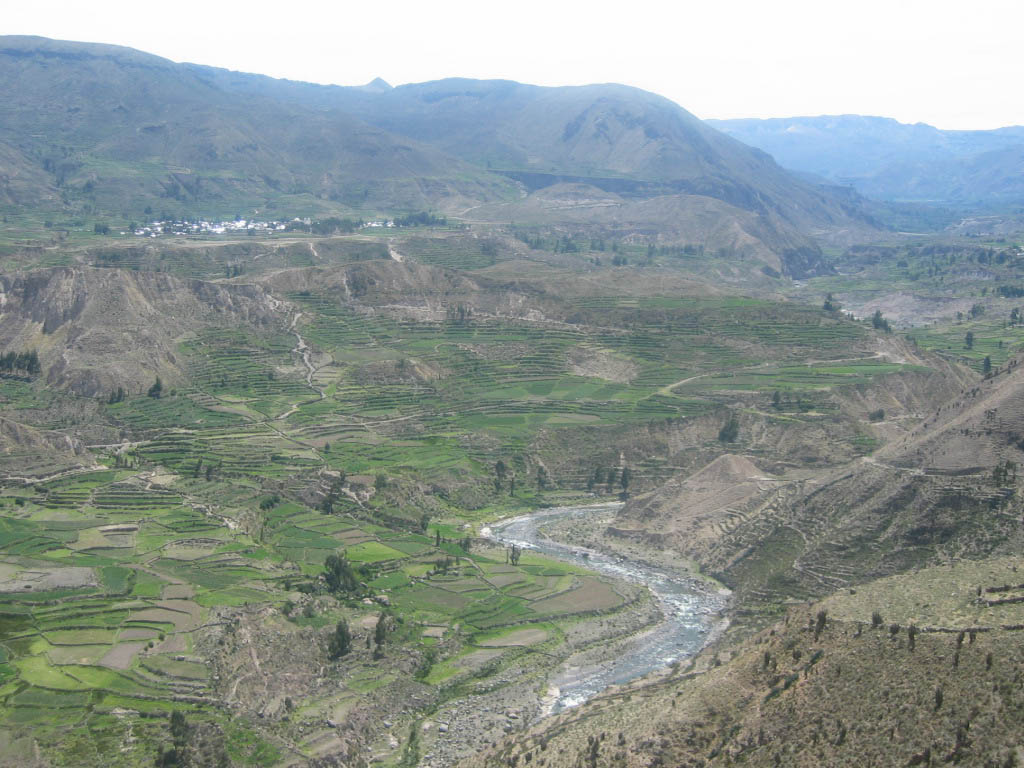
Quechua

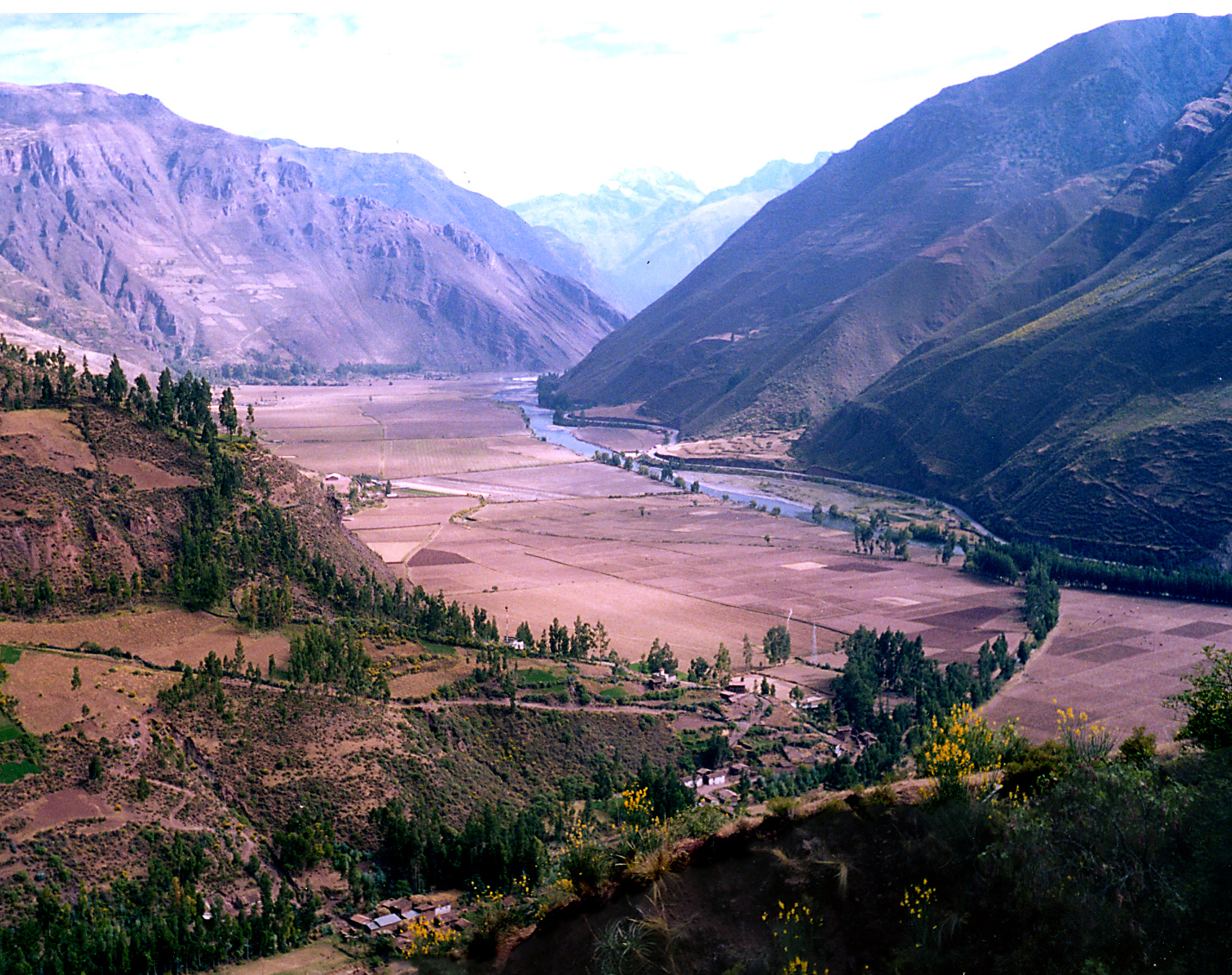
Sacred Valley of the Incas between Písac and Ollantaytambo (2002)

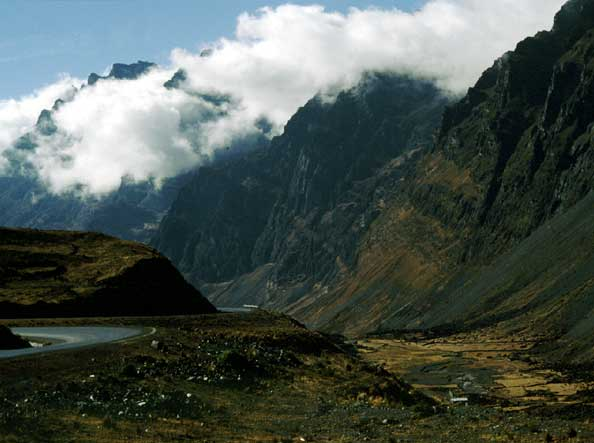
Mountain slope (4,000 m)

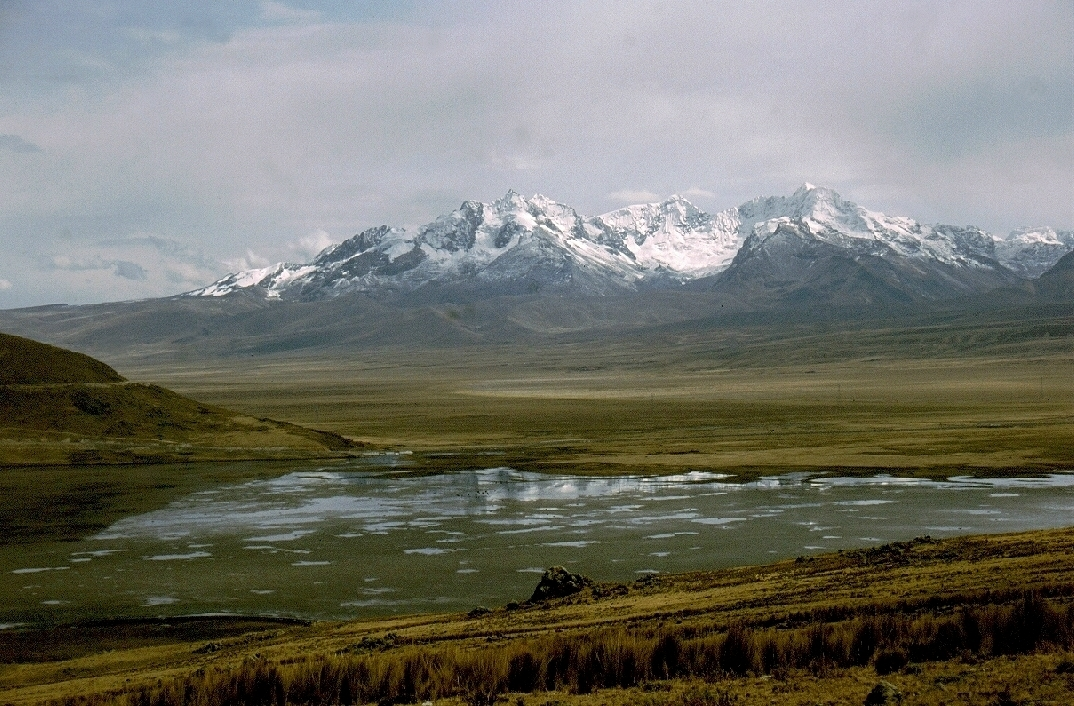
Lake Quñuqqucha (4,050 m)

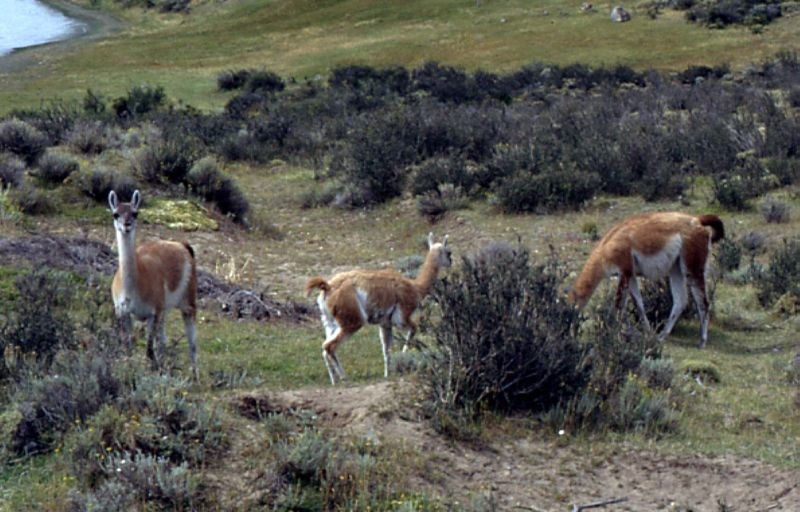
Puna with shrubs

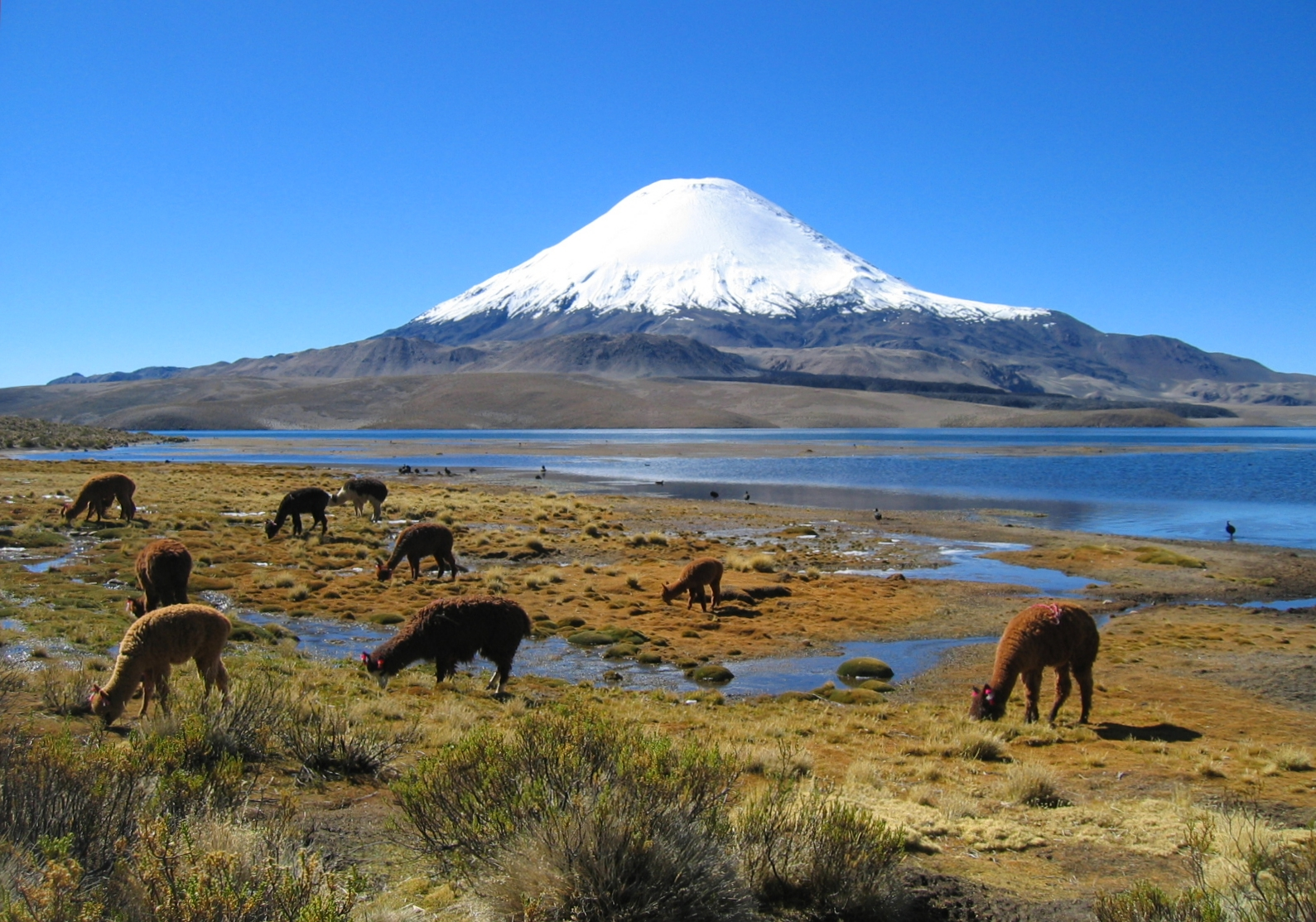
Lauca National Park - Parinacota volcano

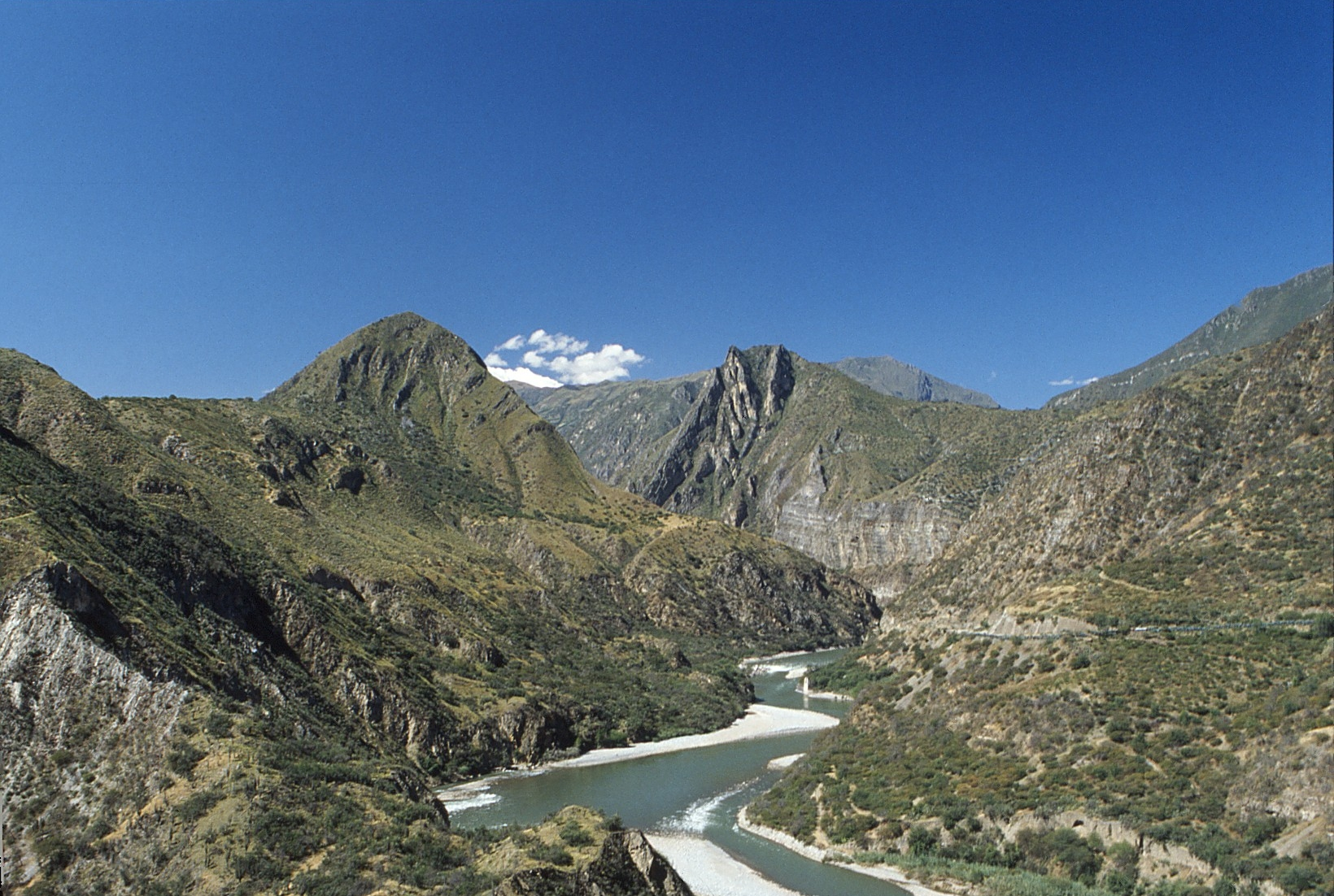
Region of Ayacucho, Peru, 1986 - Puna

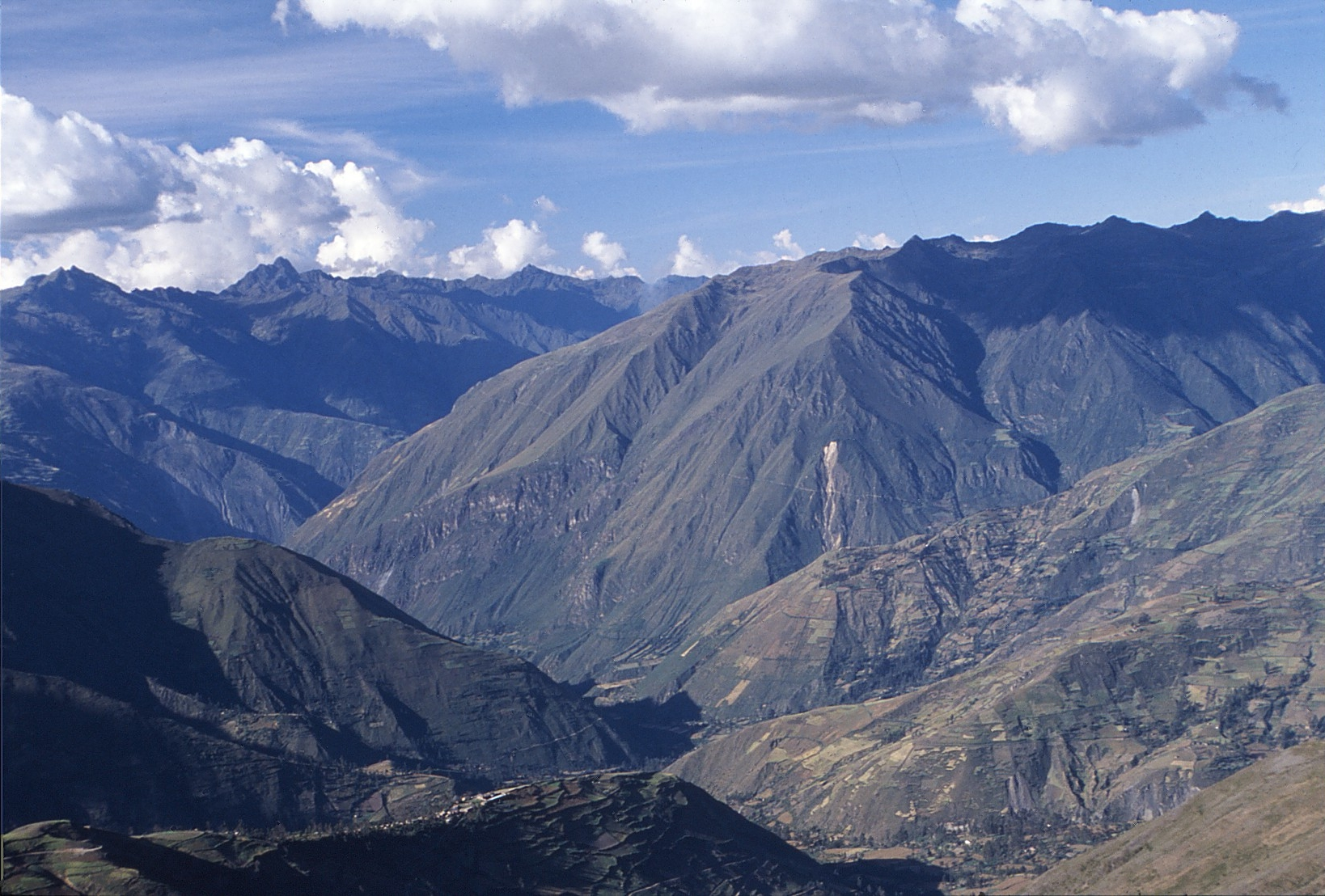
Region of Ayacucho, Peru, 1986 - Puna

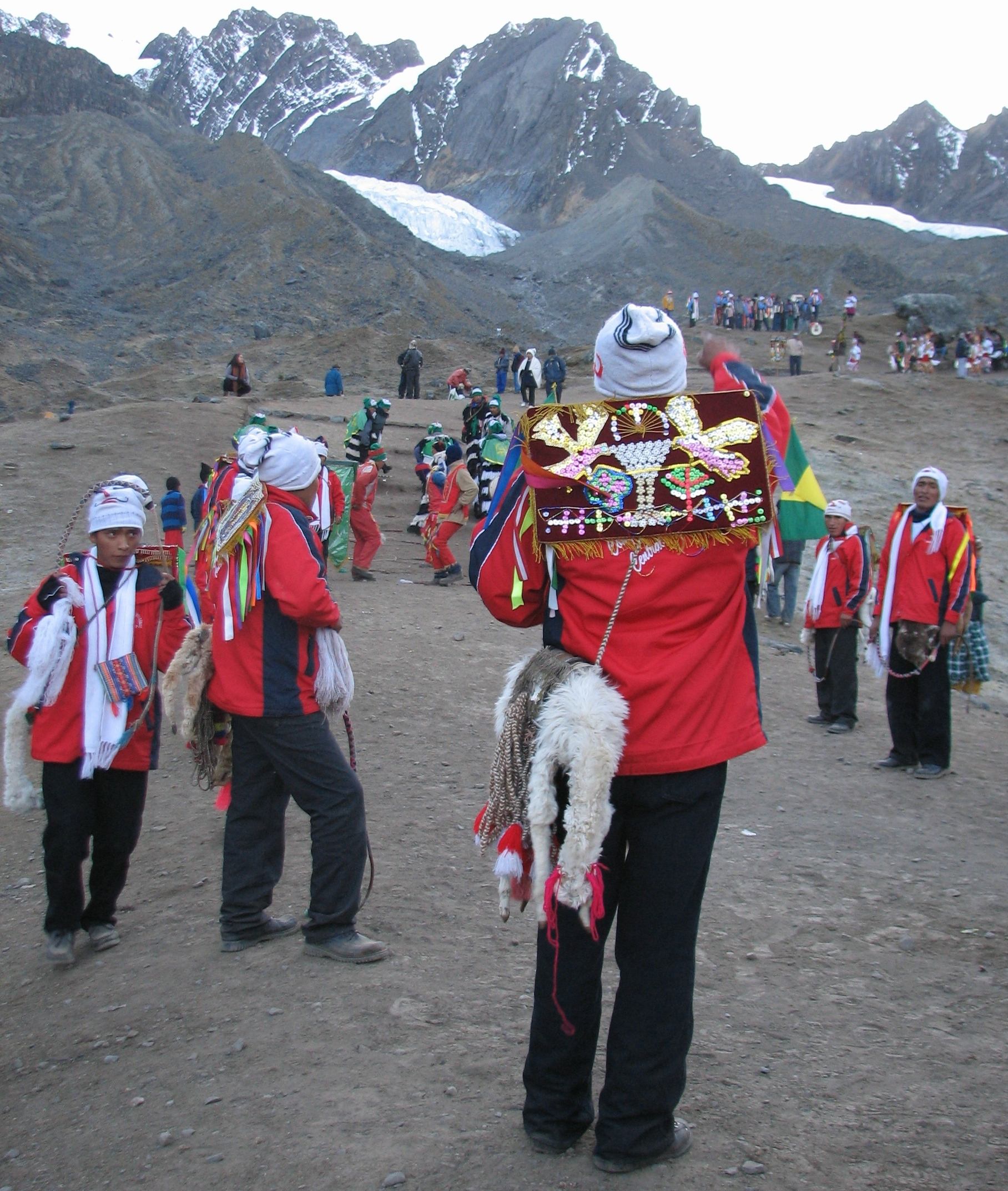
Quyllur Rit'i, glacier and alpine desert - 2007

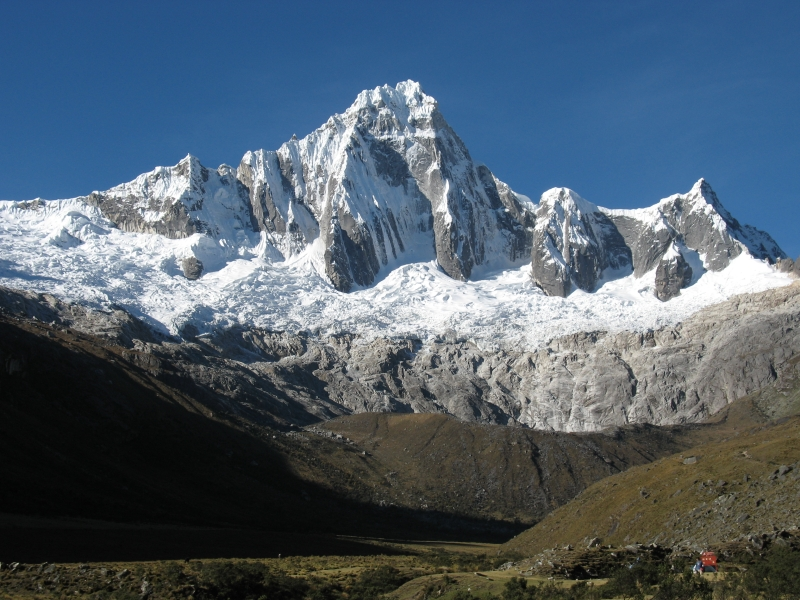
Huáscarán National Park; Cordillera Blanca; Tawllirahu (5,830 m); North of Lima

== See also ==
- Climate of Peru
- Ecoregions of Peru
- Geography of Peru
- Altitudinal zonation
