= Janca =

Geographic region of Peru

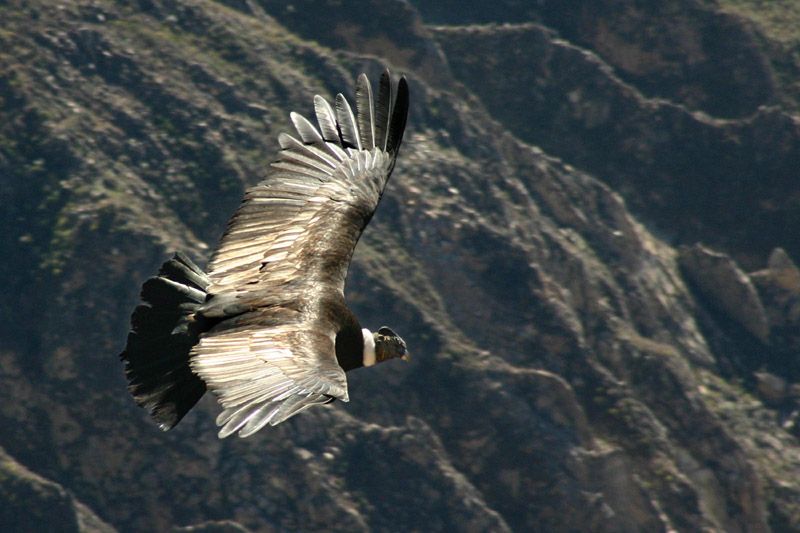
Condor flying in The Colca Canyon, Arequipa, Peru.

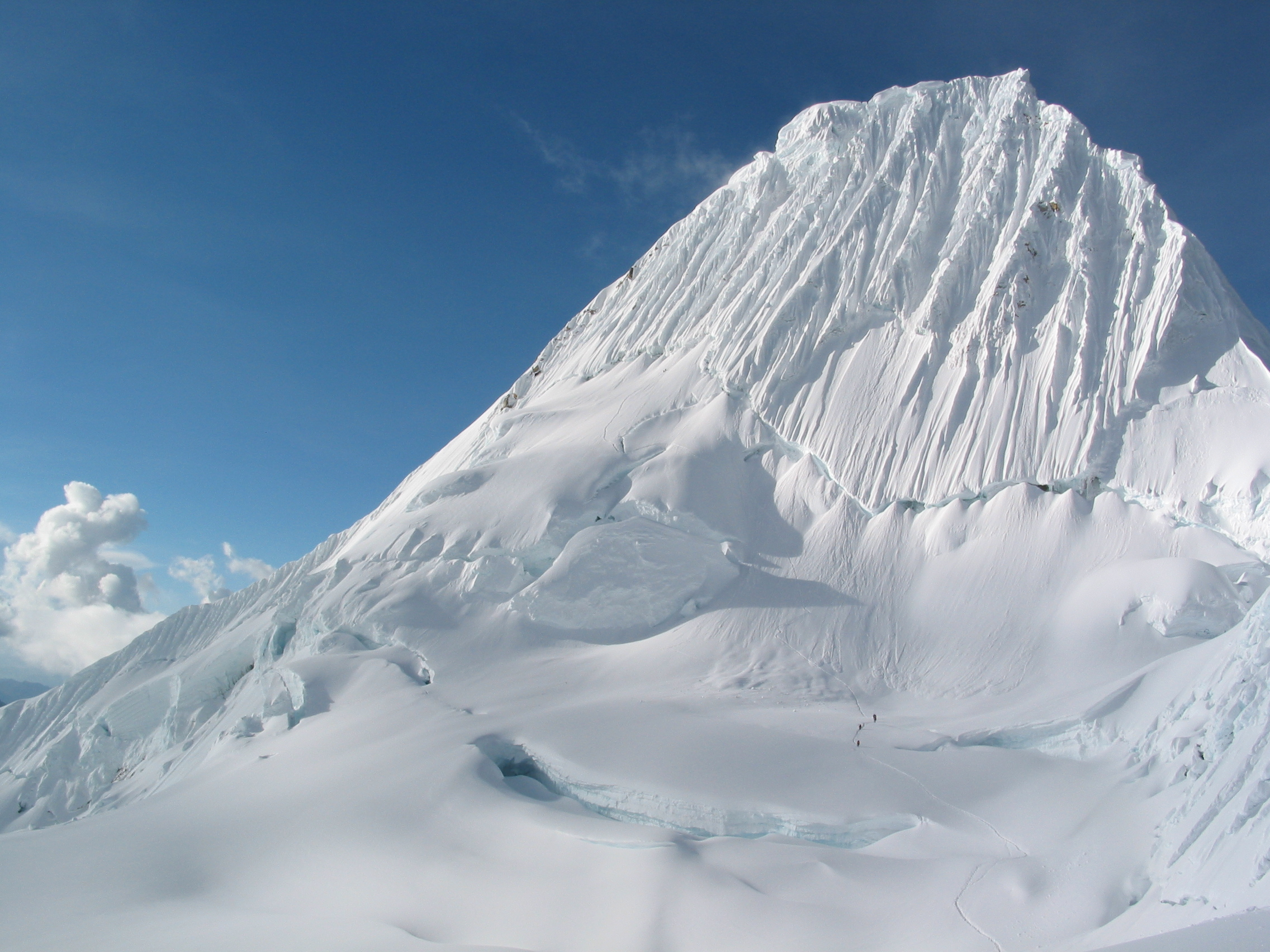
The snow peaks in the Andes are part of the janca.

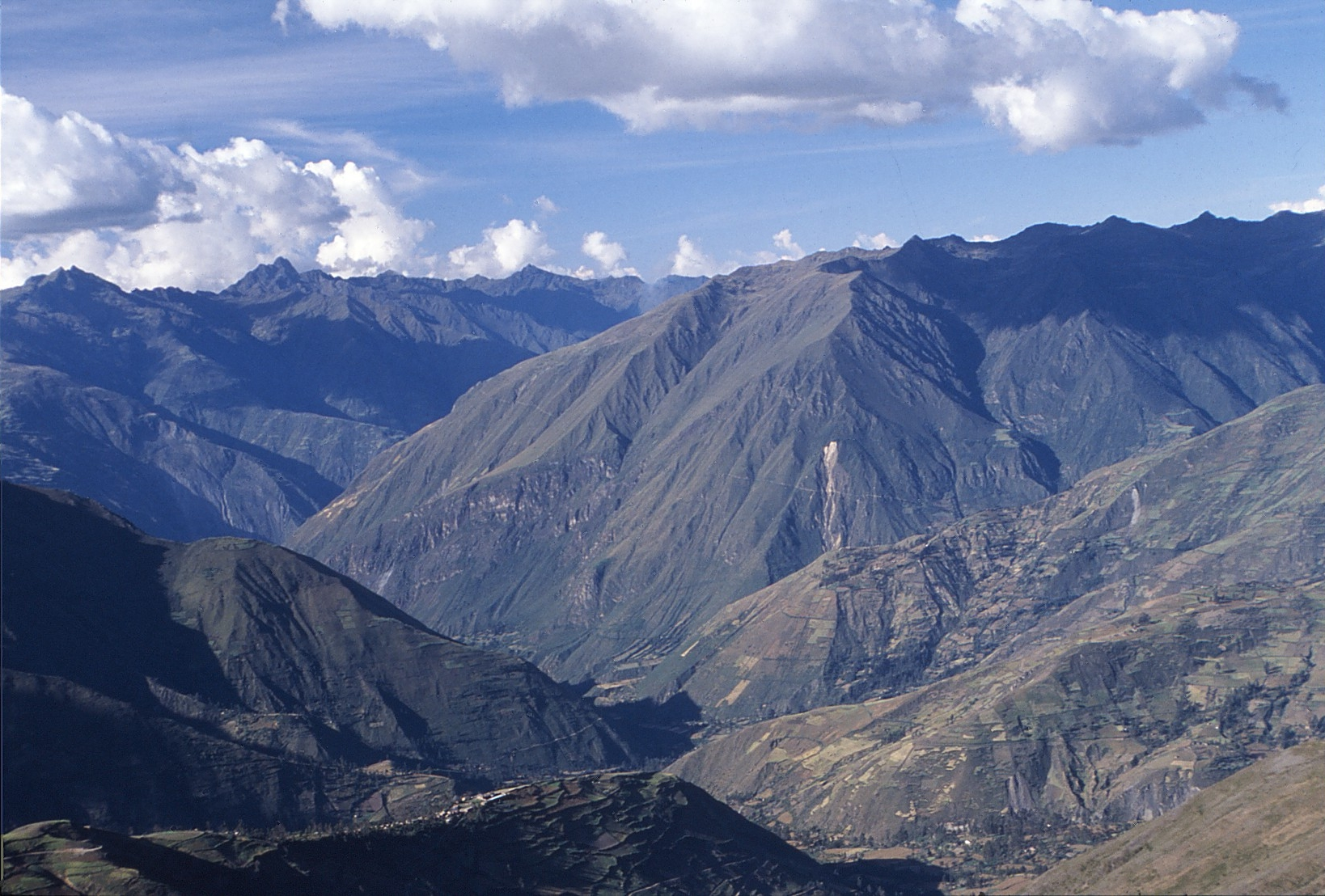
Panoramic view of the Janca Region, Ayacucho Region

Janca is one of the eight Natural Regions of Peru (Janq'u is Aymaran for “White”). It is located in the frozen heights where the condor lives.

The fauna in this region is limited because of the very cold weather. The only plant that grows here is the yareta or yarita (Azorella yarita).

== Overview ==
Andean Continental Divide

Westside	Eastside
Chala, dry coast	Lowland tropical rainforest or Selva baja
Maritime Yungas	Highland tropical rainforest or Selva alta
Maritime Yungas	Subtropical cloud forest or Fluvial Yungas
Quechua - Montane valleys	Quechua - Montane valleys
Tree line	Tree line - about 3,500 m
Suni, scrubs and agriculture	Suni, scrubs and agriculture

Mountain Top:

- Mountain passes - 4,100 m
- Puna grassland
- Andean-alpine desert
- Snow line - about 5,000 m
- Janca - Rocks, Snow and Ice
- Peak

== See also ==
- Climate zones by altitude
- Altitudinal zonation
