= Rupa-Rupa =

Geographic region of Peru

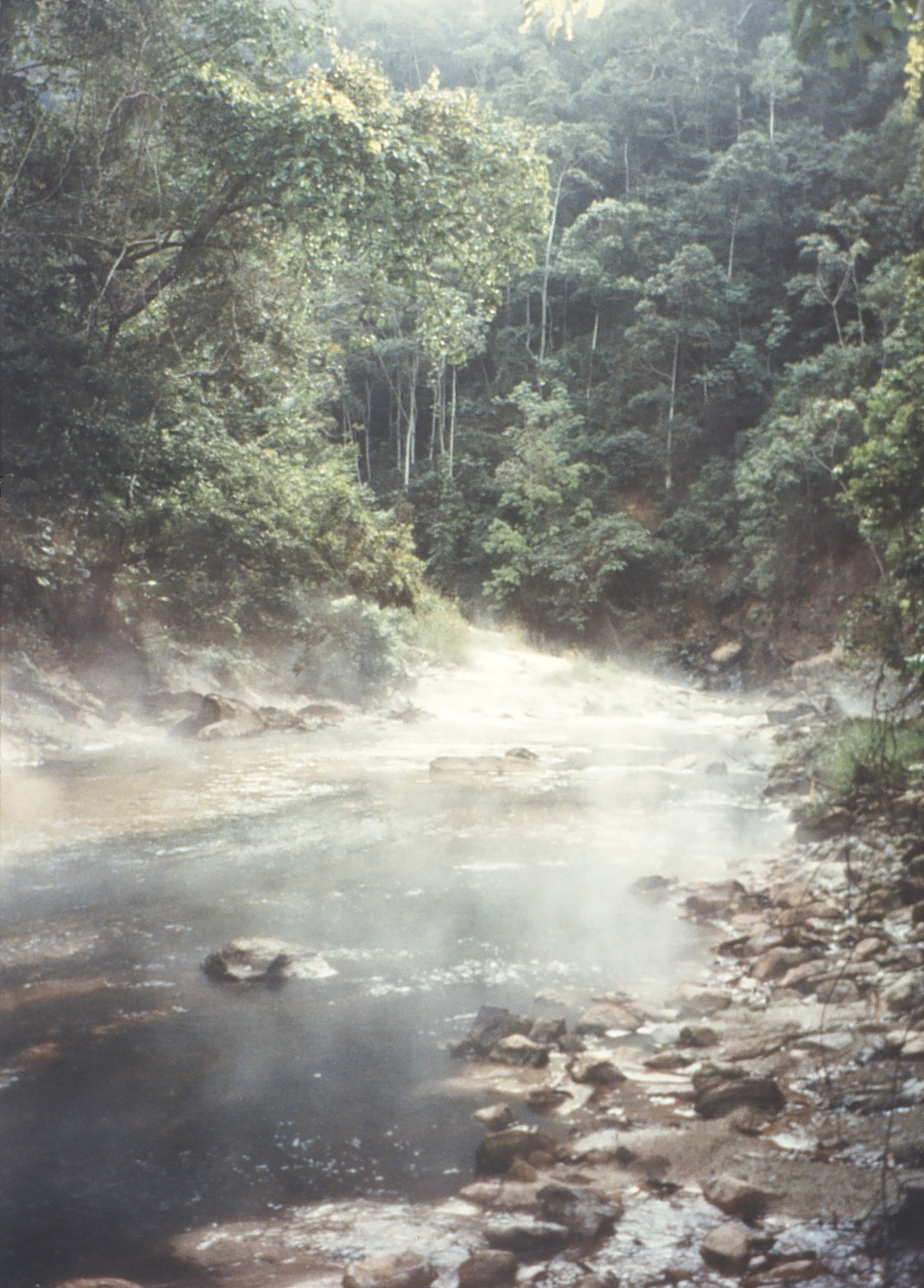
Hot springs in the Rupa-Rupa Region, Amazonas, Peru.

Rupa-Rupa or High Jungle is one of the eight natural regions of Peru. It is located between 400 and 1,000 m above the sea level to the east of the Andes mountain range in the Amazon basin of Peru. This region has many long, narrow valleys and fluvial mountain trails (canyons called pongos). The weather is warm, humid, and rainy.

This region has a tropical flora.

The fauna includes the Brazilian tapir (sachavaca, also called mountain cow), the white-lipped peccary (huangana), and the jaguar (otorongo).

Rupa Rupa is the hottest region in Peru.

== Overview ==
Andean Continental Divide

Westside	Eastside
Chala, dry coast	Lowland tropical rainforest or Selva baja
Maritime Yungas	Highland tropical rainforest or Selva alta
Maritime Yungas	Subtropical cloud forest or Fluvial Yungas
Quechua – Montane valleys	Quechua – Montane valleys
Tree line	Tree line – about 3,500 m
Suni, scrubs and agriculture	Suni, scrubs and agriculture

Mountain Top:

- Mountain passes – 4,100 m
- Puna grassland
- Andean-alpine desert
- Snow line – about 5,000 m
- Janca – Rocks, Snow and Ice
- Peak

== See also ==
- Altitudinal zonation
- Climate zones by altitude
