= Suni (geography) =

Geographic region in Peru

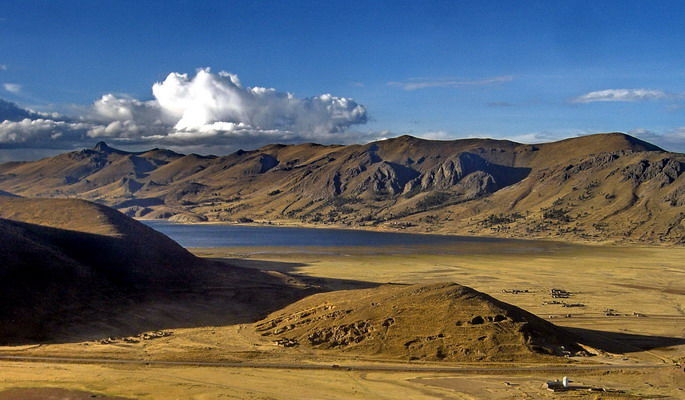
Chacas lagoon, Puno, Peru

Suni is one of the eight Natural Regions of Peru. It is located in the Andes at an altitude between 3,500 and 4,000 metres above sea level. This region is also called Jalca in the northern part of Peru. Suni has a dry and cold weather and there are many glacial valleys.

== Flora and fauna ==
The flora includes gramineous plants and shrubs such as the taya-taya (Caesalpinia spinosa), the quishuar (Buddleja coriacea), and the cantuta (Cantua buxifolia) which was considered sacred by the Incas.

Even though it is hard for plants to grow because of the weather, people are able to cultivate such crops as quinoa, maca, qañiwa, broad beans and ulluku (Ullucus tuberosus).

The main fauna is the guinea pig and, among numerous other highland birds, the Chiguanco thrush.

== Overview ==
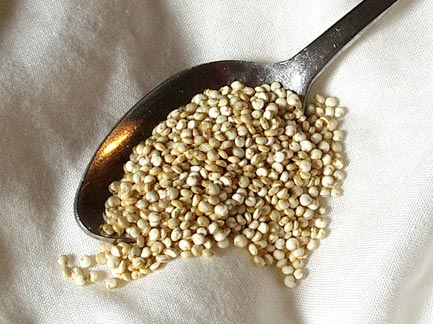
Quinoa, a flora species.

Andean Continental Divide

| Westside | Eastside |
|---|---|
| Chala, dry coast | Lowland tropical rainforest or Selva baja |
| Maritime Yungas | Highland tropical rainforest or Selva alta |
| Maritime Yungas | Subtropical cloud forest or Fluvial Yungas |
| Quechua - montane valleys | Quechua - montane valleys |
| Tree line | Tree line - about 3,500 m |
| Suni, scrubs and agriculture | Suni, scrubs and agriculture |

Mountain top:

- Mountain passes - 4,100 m
- Puna grassland
- Andean-alpine desert
- Snow line - about 5,000 m
- Janca - rocks, snow and ice
- Peak

== See also ==
- Climate zones by altitude
- Altitudinal zonation
