= Chala =

Peruvian natural region

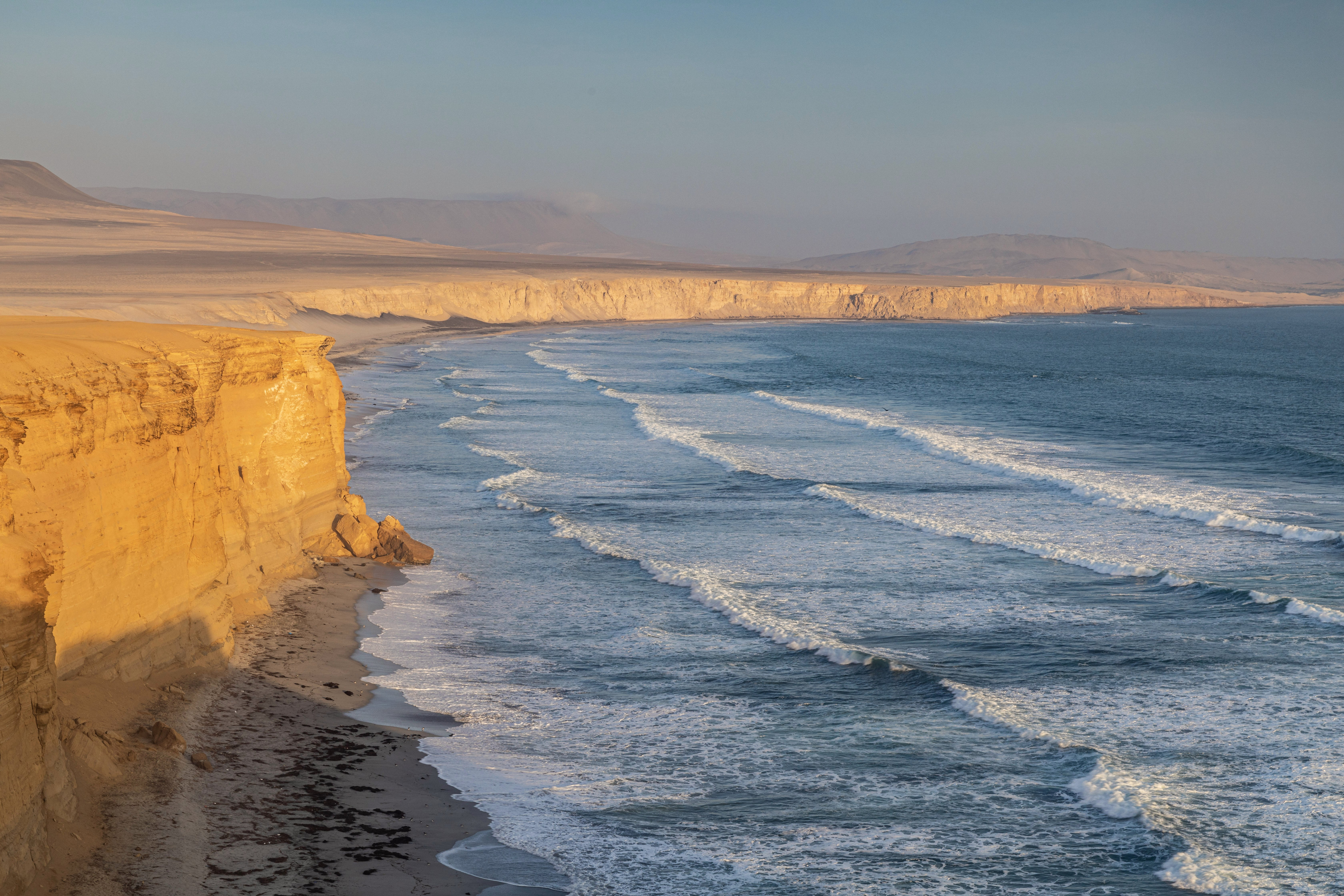
- The Chala at Paracas National Reserve
- Area: 185,000 km^{2} (71,000 mi^{2})

Geography
- Country: Peru

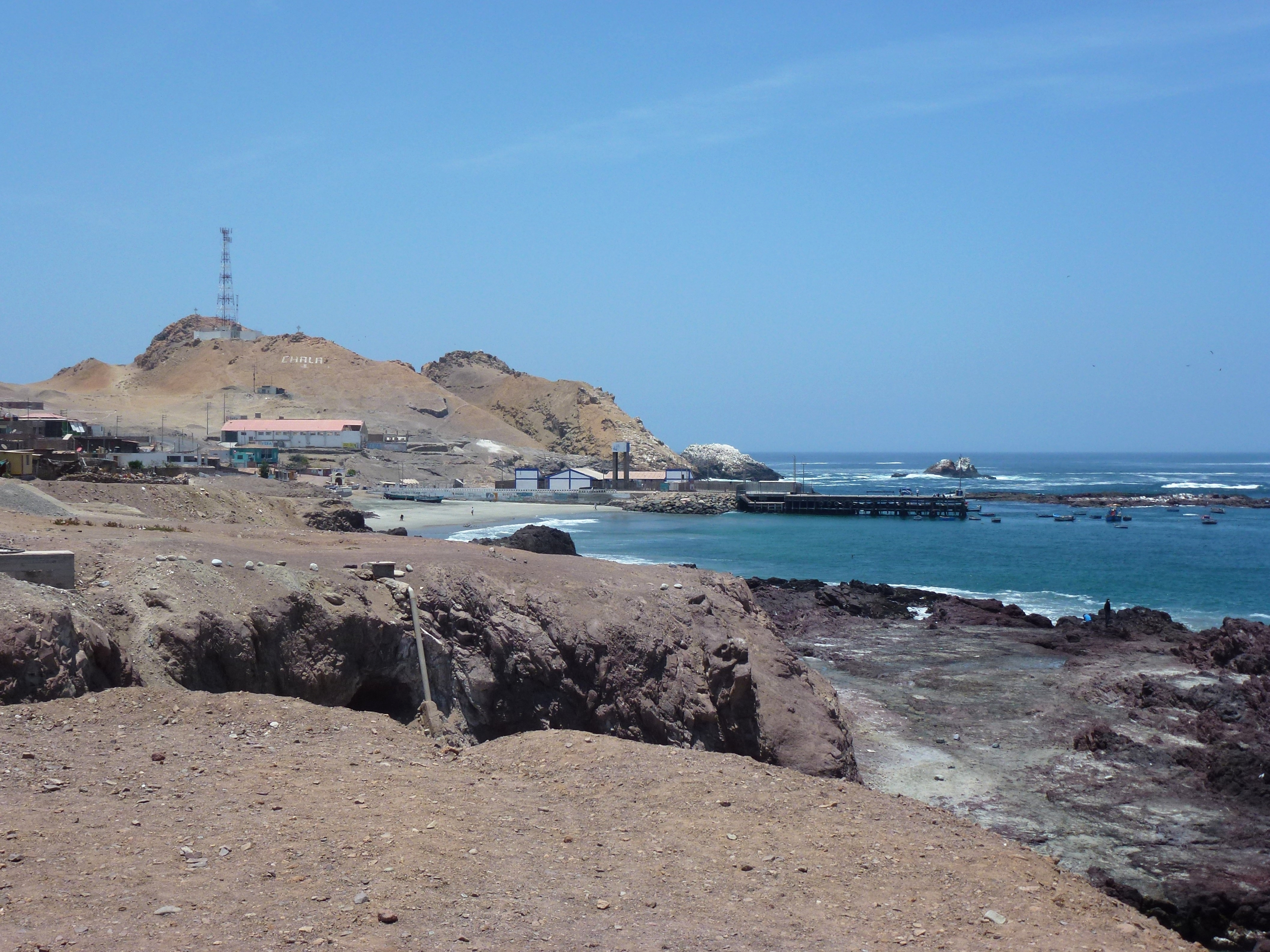
The coast of Chala

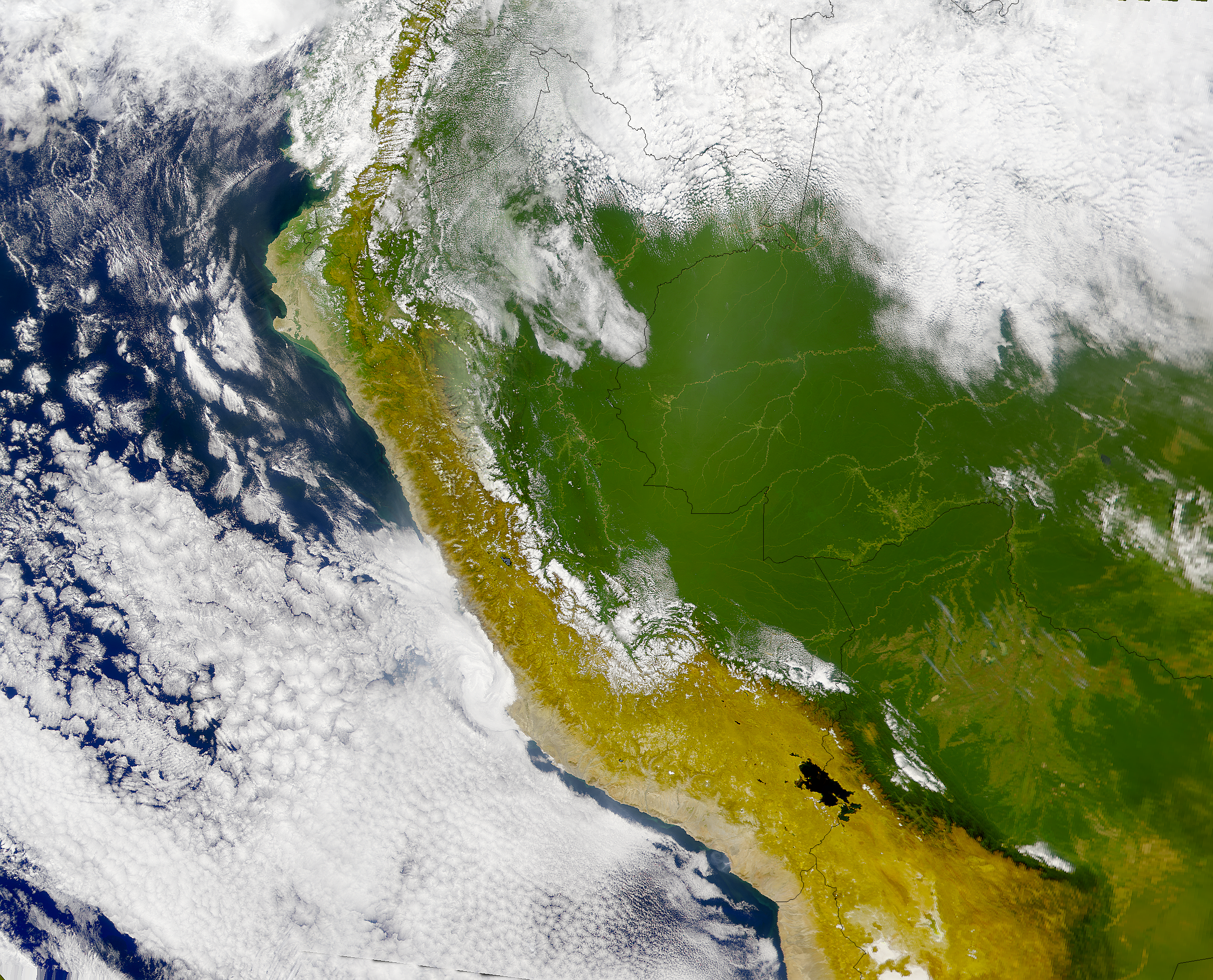
Satellite image of Peru showing the coastal desert area

The Chala or coastal desert of Peru is one of the eight natural regions in Peru. It is formed by all the western lands that arise from sea level up to the height of 500 meters. The coastal desert of Peru is largely devoid of vegetation but a unique fog and mist-fed ecosystem called Lomas is scattered among hills near the Pacific coast at elevations up to 1,000 metres (3,300 ft). It is part of the Pacific desert or South American Coastal Deserts Bioregion, according to One Earth.

In this region, the flora includes vegetation that grows near the rivers, like the carob tree, the palo verde, salty grama grass, manglar or mangrove tree, the carrizo or giant reed and the Caña brava (ditch reed); and plants that grow in the hills, such as the Amancay or Peruvian daffodil (Hymenocallis amancaes), the wild tomato, the mito or Peruvian papaya (Vasconcellea candicans), and the divi-divi (Cæsalpinia coriaria).

The coastal fauna of the Chala includes sea lions, the anchovy and several seabirds.

Common trees in the north are the faique, the sapote, the zapayal, the barrigon and other thorny tropical savanna trees of the equatorial dry forests on the northern coast of Piura and Tumbes. Páramo and the northern coast of the Piura region are not under the influence of the cold Humboldt Current. Páramo has a tree line at the border, even on the westside of the continental divide.

== Overview ==
Andean Continental Divide

Westside	Eastside
Chala, dry coast	Lowland tropical rainforest or Selva baja
Maritime Yungas	Highland tropical rainforest or Selva alta
Maritime Yungas	Subtropical cloud forest or Fluvial Yungas
Quechua - Montane valleys	Quechua - Montane valleys
Tree line	Tree line - about 3,500 m
Suni, scrubs and agriculture	Suni, scrubs and agriculture

Mountain top:

- Mountain passes - 4,100 m
- Puna grassland
- Andean-alpine desert
- Snow line - about 5,000 m
- Janca - rocks, snow and ice
- Peak

== Loma-vegetation ==
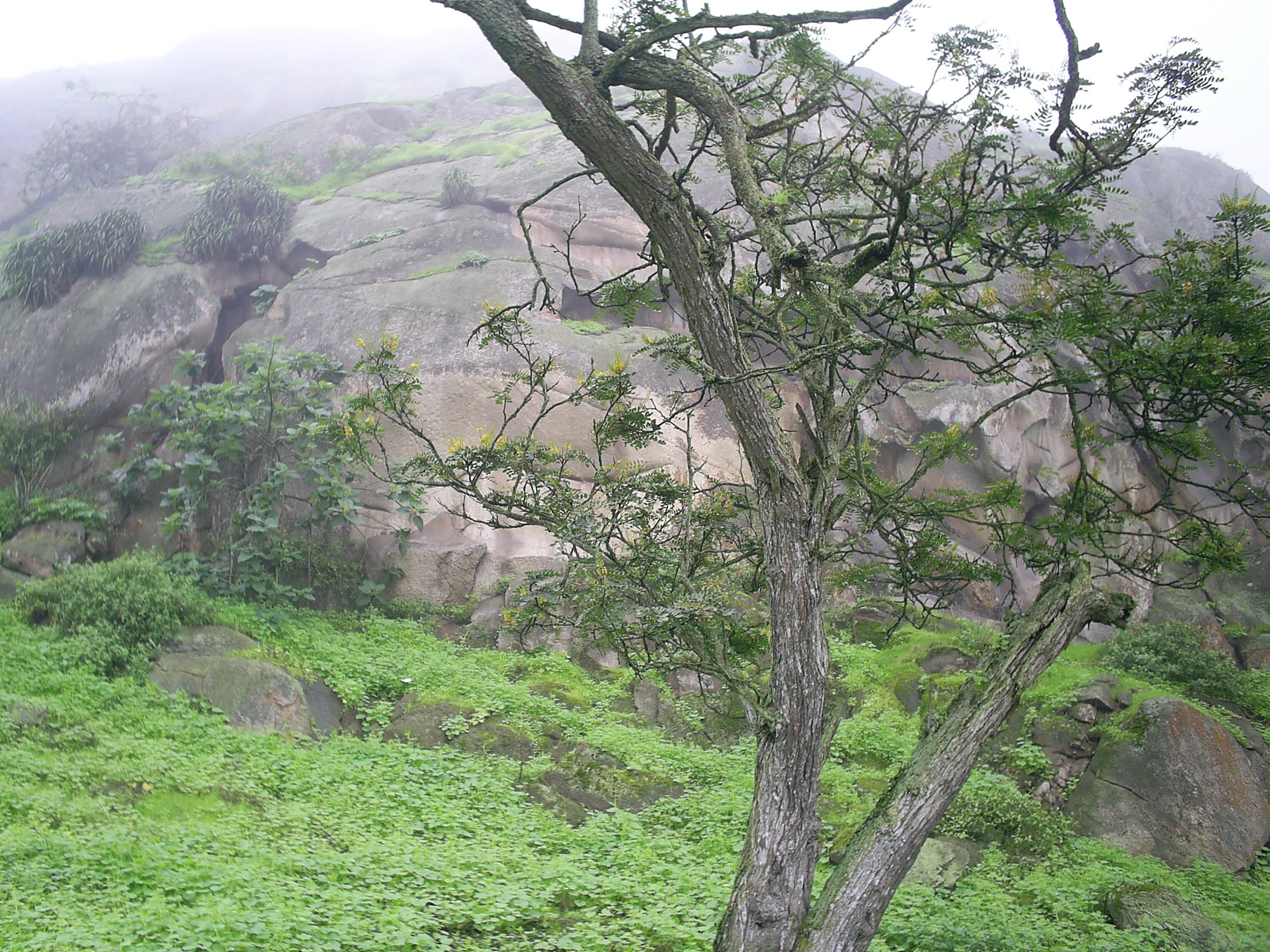
Lomas de Lachay, Lima, Peru

Loma-vegetation, is found between 150 metres (490 ft) and 600 metres (2,000 ft) and it is situated at the first westside slope near the coast in Peru. This subregion has a subtropical desert climate with little rainfall along the central and southern coast (drier as one goes south). The average year round day temperature is 21 °C (70 °F) (max 33 °C, min 8 °C).

Orientation:

- Lomas, fog and mist-fed ecosystems on hills near the ocean and scattered along the nearly-rainless coastal desert.
- Lomas de Lachay, Huaral Province in Lima, a protected example of a mist-fed ecosystem.

== See also ==
- Climate zones by altitude
- Altitudinal zonation
