= Quechua (geography) =

Geographical region of Peru

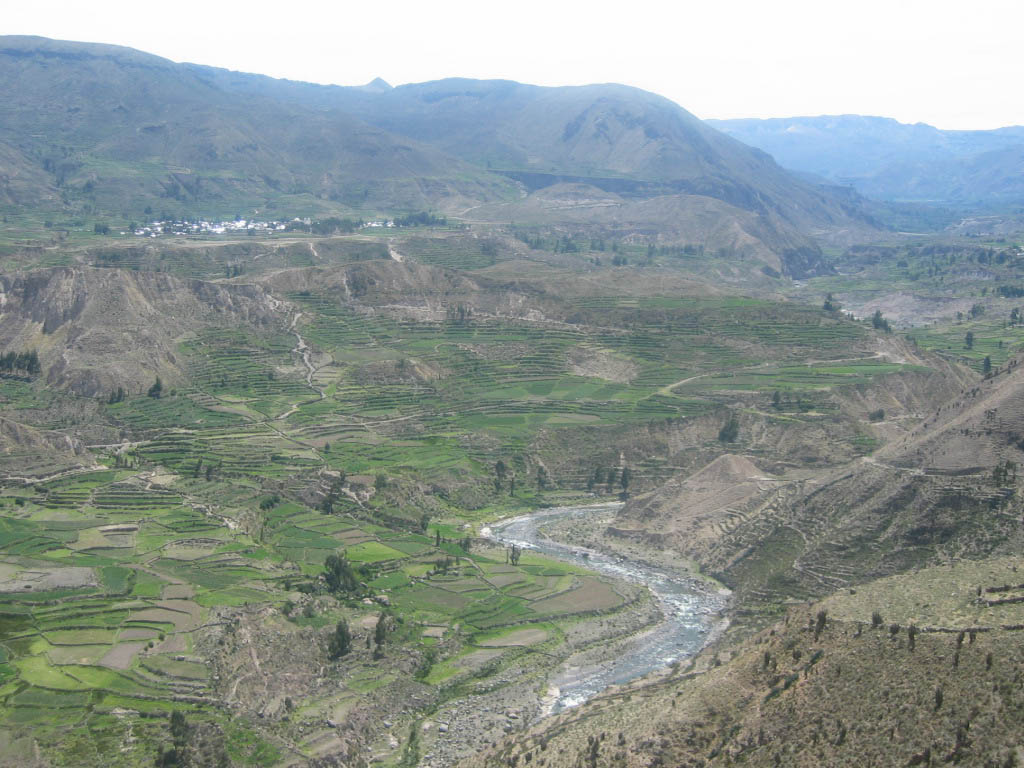
Valle del Colca, Arequipa, Peru

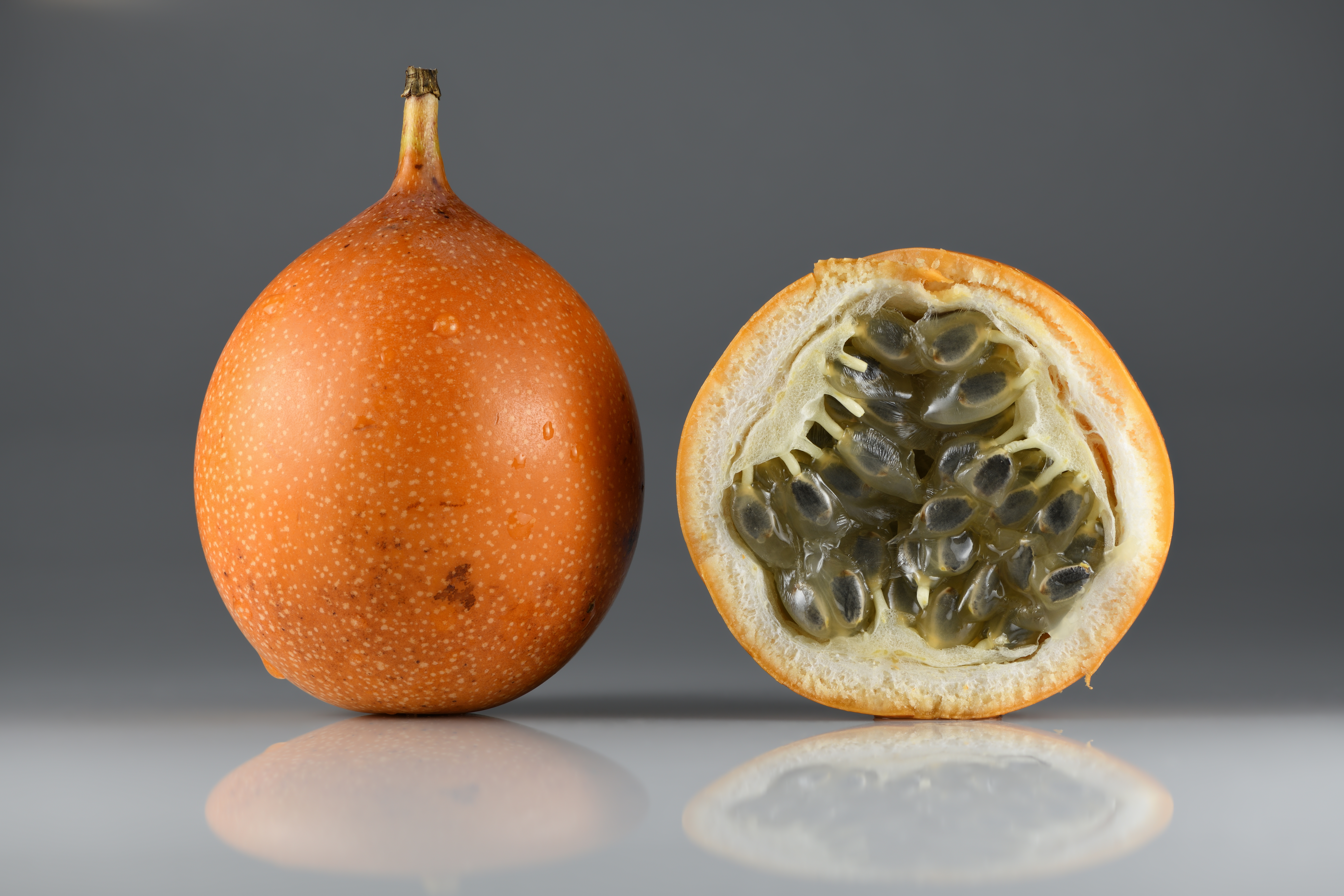
Passion fruit or Granadilla

Quechua is one of the eight Natural Regions of Peru and is between 2,300 and 3,500 m above sea level. It is composed of big valleys divided by rivers fed by estival rains.

Its flora includes Andean alder, gongapa, and arracacha. People who live in this region, cultivate corn, squash, passionfruit, papaya, wheat, and peach.

Notable fauna include birds like the chihuanco or white-necked thrush.

== Overview ==
Andean Continental Divide

Westside	Eastside
Chala, dry coast	Lowland tropical rainforest or Selva baja
Maritime Yungas	Highland tropical rainforest or Selva alta
Maritime Yungas	Subtropical cloud forest or Fluvial Yungas
Quechua - Montane valleys	Quechua - Montane valleys
Tree line	Tree line - about 3,500 m
Suni, scrubs and agriculture	Suni, scrubs and agriculture

Mountain Top:

- Mountain passes - 4,100 m
- Puna grassland
- Andean-alpine desert
- Snow line - about 5,000 m
- Janca - Rocks, Snow and Ice
- Peak

== See also ==
- Climate zones by altitude
- Altitudinal zonation
