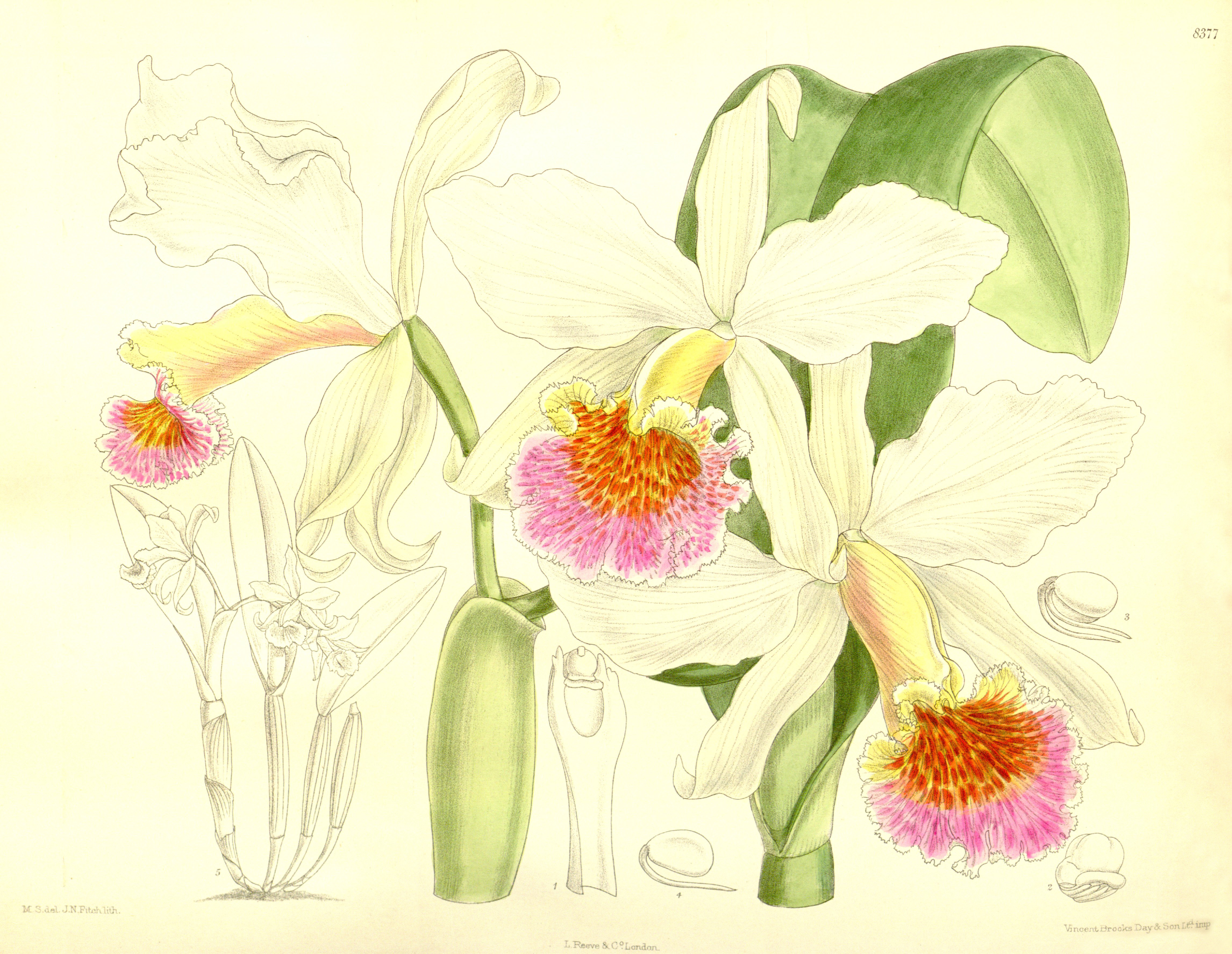
- Cattleya rex flowers and leaf.

Conservation status
- Endangered (IUCN 2.3)

Scientific classification
- Kingdom: Plantae
- Clade: Tracheophytes
- Clade: Angiosperms
- Clade: Monocots
- Order: Asparagales
- Family: Orchidaceae
- Subfamily: Epidendroideae
- Genus: Cattleya
- Subgenus: Cattleya subg. Cattleya
- Section: Cattleya sect. Cattleya
- Species: C. rex

Binomial name
- Cattleya rex O'Brien

= Cattleya rex =

Species of plant

Cattleya rex is a species of epiphytic orchid of showy white flowers, native to montane forests in Peru and Bolivia.

== Description ==
Epiphytic herb with cylindric or spindle-shaped pseudobulbs, up to 35 cm. high, with one leaf at the top. Leaf oblong or elliptic-oblong, obtuse, light green, up to 35 cm. long and up to 6 cm. wide, coriaceous. Inflorescence up to 20.3 cm. high, with 3 to 6 (or 10) flowers. Flowers large and showy, up to 17 cm wide, with sepals and petals being cream-colored or ivory white, except the lip or labellum, which is colored with yellow, rose and red. Sepals narrowly elliptic; petals ovate, elliptic or rhomboid; lip folded to form a tube, with very wavy front margin. Pollinia 4, with curved appendages.

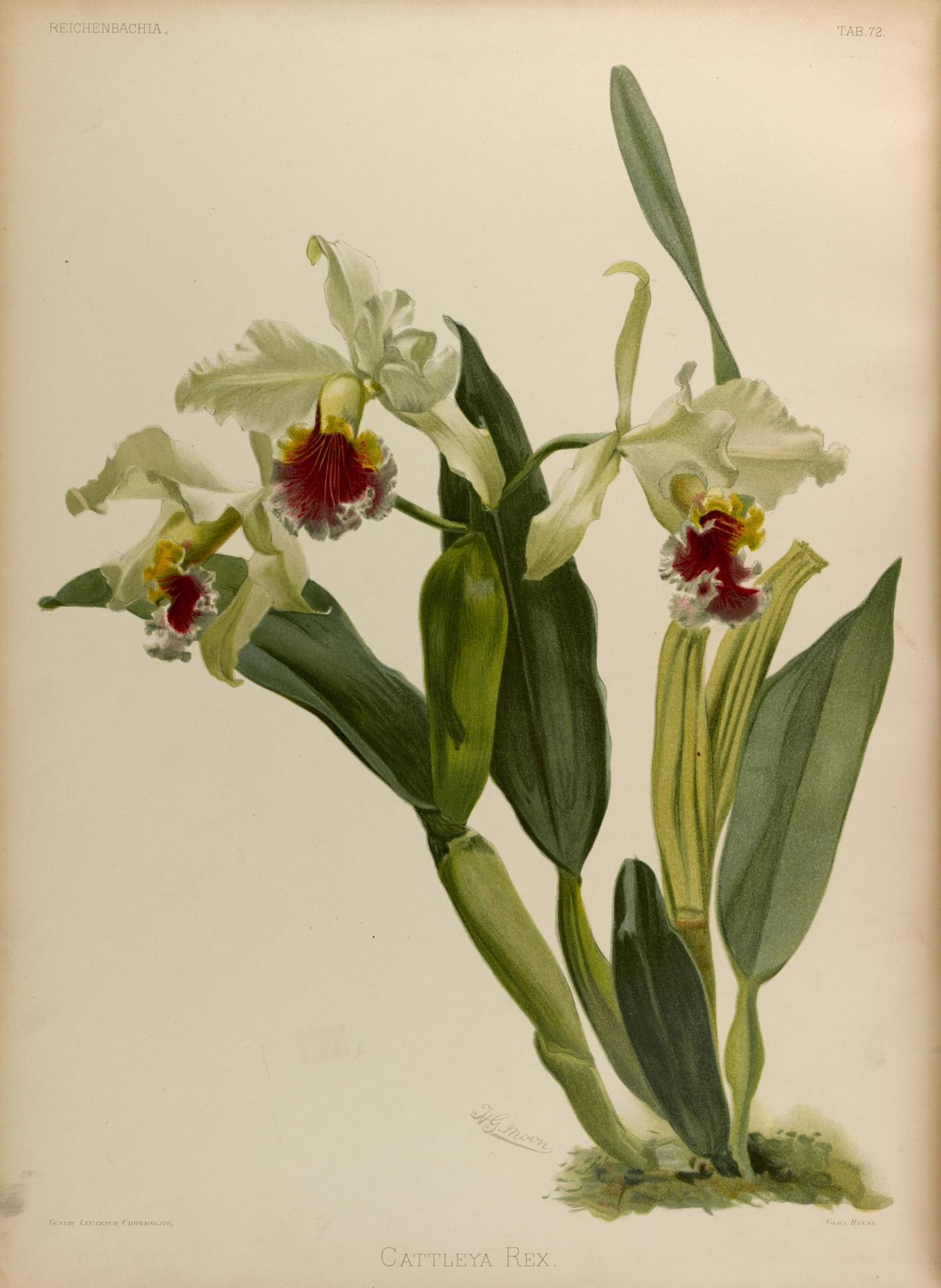
Cattleya rex. Habit.

== Taxonomy ==
James O'Brien described the species for the first time in 1890 from a live flowering plant collected in the area of Moyobamba, San Martín by Mr. Bungeroth and cultivated at L'Horticulture International, Brussels, by Mr. L. Linden. That was the first known flowering plant outside the native habitat of C. rex.

== Distribution and habitat ==
Cattleya rex is known from a few localities in the regions of San Martin and Puno in Peru and the department of La Paz in Bolivia. It occurs in montane forests and low montane seasonally dry forests at 800–2500 m, growing on tree branches.

== Ecology ==
In its native habitat, flowering occurs between December and March.

== Conservation ==
Cattleya rex has been assigned an endangered conservation status in 1997 by the IUCN. Previously believed to be a Peruvian endemic, in 2013 a new locality was reported in Bolivia, thus increasing the area of extension for the species.

== Cultivation ==
Cattleya rex requires a temperate climate (16 °C at night and 28 °C during the day) and good ventilation (a dark and enclosed environment will attract fungi or bacterial diseases).

This species does not tolerate dryness for long periods, so watering must be done regularly and should be reduced in frequency during winter. However, the growing medium (cork slabs, baskets or pots) must have good drainage, so the roots can dry properly after watering or root rot may appear.

Light requirements are high but not direct sunlight. Shade is needed during summer and brightest days of other seasons (especially if leaves turn yellow).

Humidity must be between 50-70%, it can be achieved with the help of misters or humidifiers.
