= Climate of Peru =

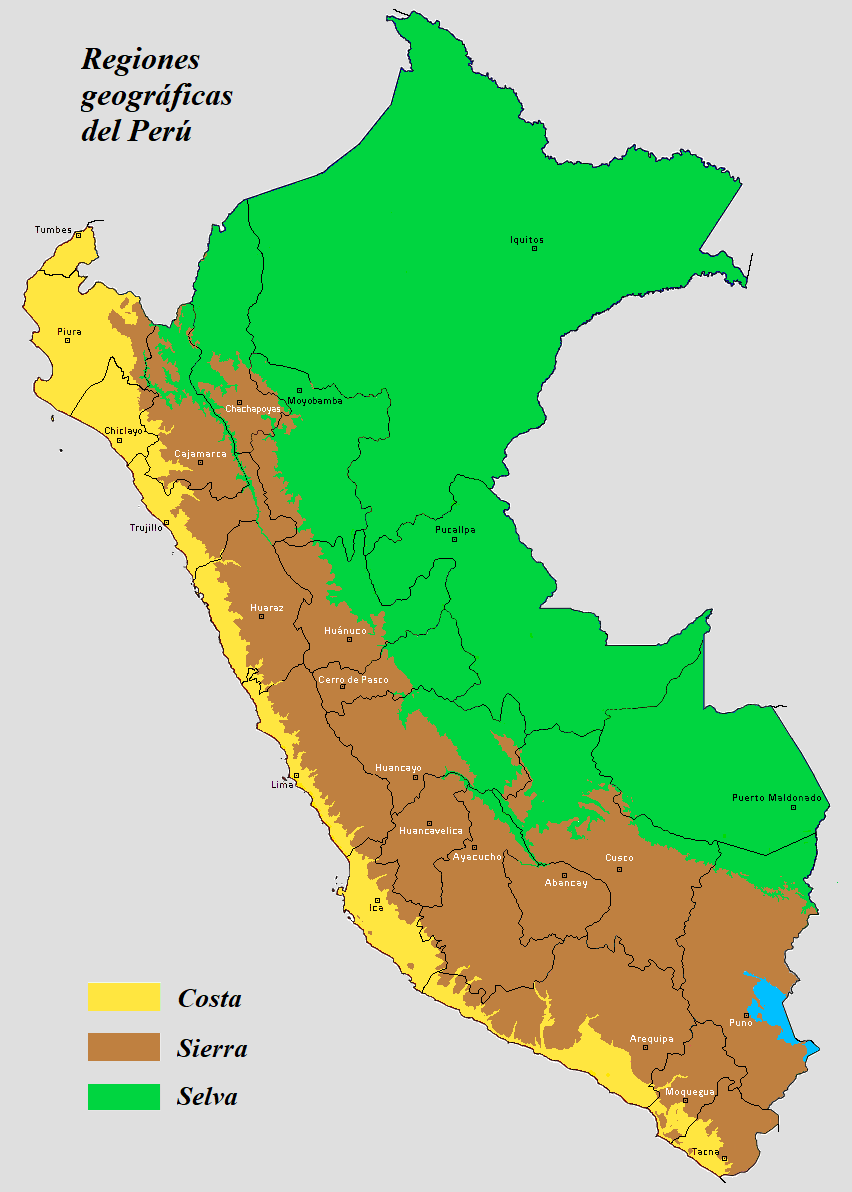
Map of the Peruvian regions by climate type: coastal desert (yellow) – Andes mountains (brown) – Amazon rainforest (green)

Peru map of Köppen climate classification.

Climate of Peru describes the diverse climates of this large South American country with an area of 1,285,216 km^{2} (496,225 sq mi). Peru is located entirely in the tropics but features desert and mountain climates as well as tropical rainforests. Elevations above sea level in the country range from −37 to 6,778 m (−121 to 22,238 ft) and precipitation ranges from less than 20 mm (0.79 in) annually to more than 8,000 mm (310 in). There are three main climatic regions: the Pacific Ocean coast is one of the driest deserts in the world but with some unique features; the high Andes mountains have a variety of microclimates depending on elevation and exposure and with temperatures and precipitation from temperate to polar and wet to dry; and the Amazon basin has tropical climates, mostly with abundant precipitation, along with sub-tropical climates in elevations above 1,550 m (5,090 ft).

== Pacific coastal desert ==
The coastal desert of Peru extends unbroken from near the northern border with Ecuador to the southern border with Chile, a north to south distance of 1,600 km (990 mi). Three names are sometimes applied to the desert in different parts of the coastline. The Sechura Desert is in northern Peru. Southward is the Peruvian coastal desert which becomes at an indefinite location the Atacama Desert which continues into Chile.

The Sechura is warmer and less impacted by the cloud cover that characterizes the more southern parts of the coastal desert, but there is a uniformity in precipitation along the entire coastline with less than 30 mm (1.2 in) annually. The desert strip along the Pacific is narrow, at its widest about 120 km (75 mi) before the land climbs into the Andes and precipitation increases with elevation.

The following table summarizes climatic statistics for cities in the north, central, and southern parts of the coastal desert

Coast Climates
Department	Representative city	Latitude	Average annual temp.	Hottest month(s)	Coolest month(s)	Annual precipitation	Wettest month(s)	Climate (Köppen)
Tumbes	Tumbes	3.57° S	25.3 °C (77.5 °F)	28.5 °C (83.3 °F) (February, March)	22.8 °C (73.0 °F) (August)	250 mm (9.8 in)	February – 80 mm (3.1 in)	Aw
Piura	Piura	5.19° S	24.8 °C (76.6 °F)	28.0 °C (82.4 °F) (February)	21.0 °C (69.8 °F) (July, August)	120 mm (4.7 in)	February – 35 mm (1.4 in)	BWh
Lambayeque	Chiclayo	6.77° S	22.6 °C (72.7 °F)	26.7 °C (80.1 °F) (February)	19.0 °C (66.2 °F) (August)	30 mm (1.2 in)	February – 8 mm (0.31 in)	BWh
La Libertad	Trujillo	8.11° S	19.9 °C (67.8 °F)	23.5 °C (74.3 °F) (February)	17.0 °C (62.6 °F) (August)	15 mm (0.59 in)	August – 3 mm (0.12 in)	BWh
Ancash	Chimbote	9.07° S	20.4 °C (68.7 °F)	24.0 °C (75.2 °F) (February)	17.2 °C (63.0 °F) (August)	10 mm (0.39 in)	August – 2 mm (0.079 in)	BWh
Callao	Callao	12.06° S	19.1 °C (66.4 °F)	23.2 °C (73.8 °F) (February)	15.7 °C (60.3 °F) (August)	15 mm (0.59 in)	July–September – 3 mm (0.12 in)	BWh
Lima	Lima	12.05° S	18.7 °C (65.7 °F)	23.0 °C (73.4 °F) (February)	15.3 °C (59.5 °F) (August)	16 mm (0.63 in)	July–September – 3 mm (0.12 in)	BWh
Ica	Ica	14.07° S	22.1 °C (71.8 °F)	27.5 °C (81.5 °F) (February)	17.0 °C (62.6 °F) (July)	5 mm (0.20 in)	February – 2 mm (0.079 in)	BWh
Arequipa	Mollendo	17.02° S	18.2 °C (64.8 °F)	22.5 °C (72.5 °F) (February)	15.0 °C (59.0 °F) (August)	8 mm (0.31 in)	August – 2 mm (0.079 in)	BWk
Moquegua	Ilo	17.64° S	18.3 °C (64.9 °F)	22.4 °C (72.3 °F) (February)	15.2 °C (59.4 °F) (August)	5 mm (0.20 in)	August – 2 mm (0.079 in)	BWk
Tacna	Tacna	18.01° S	17.8 °C (64.0 °F)	21.9 °C (71.4 °F) (February)	14.0 °C (57.2 °F) (July)	18 mm (0.71 in)	August – 4 mm (0.16 in)	BWk

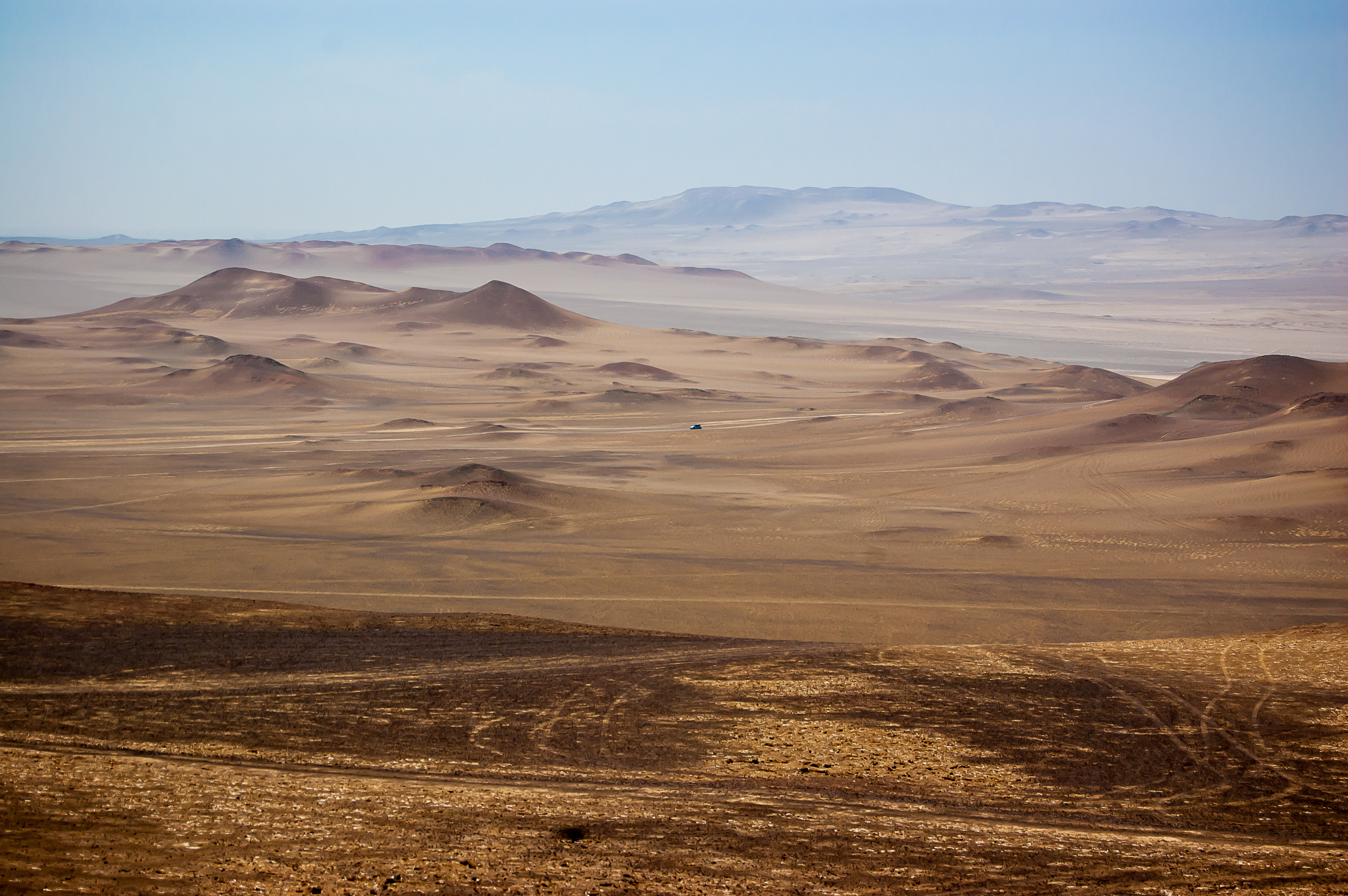
Most of the coastal desert is devoid of vegetation.

A characteristic of the Peruvian coastal desert is low average temperatures despite its tropical latitudes. In the tropics the average annual temperature is usually at least 25 °C (77 °F) with little temperature variation among months. By contrast most of the Peruvian coastal desert has average annual temperatures of less than 20 °C (68 °F) and with temperatures falling to or near 10 °C (50 °F) during the Southern Hemisphere's winter. The relatively low temperatures of the Peruvian coastal desert are caused by the cold Humboldt Current. Ocean water temperatures in Lima in September, the coldest month, are as low as 14.4 °C (57.9 °F) similar to water temperatures near Los Angeles during its winter months.

The cold waters of the Humboldt Current also create a moist fog called garúa in Peru. The cold water, especially in the Southern Hemisphere's winter from May to November, cause an inversion, the air near the ocean surface being cooler than the air above, contrary to most climatic situations. During the Southern Hemisphere's winter, the trade winds blow thick stratus clouds inland over coastal areas up to an elevation of 1,000 m (3,300 ft) and the dense fog coalesces into drizzle and mist. In the Southern Hemisphere's summer from December to April, the weather is mostly sunny.

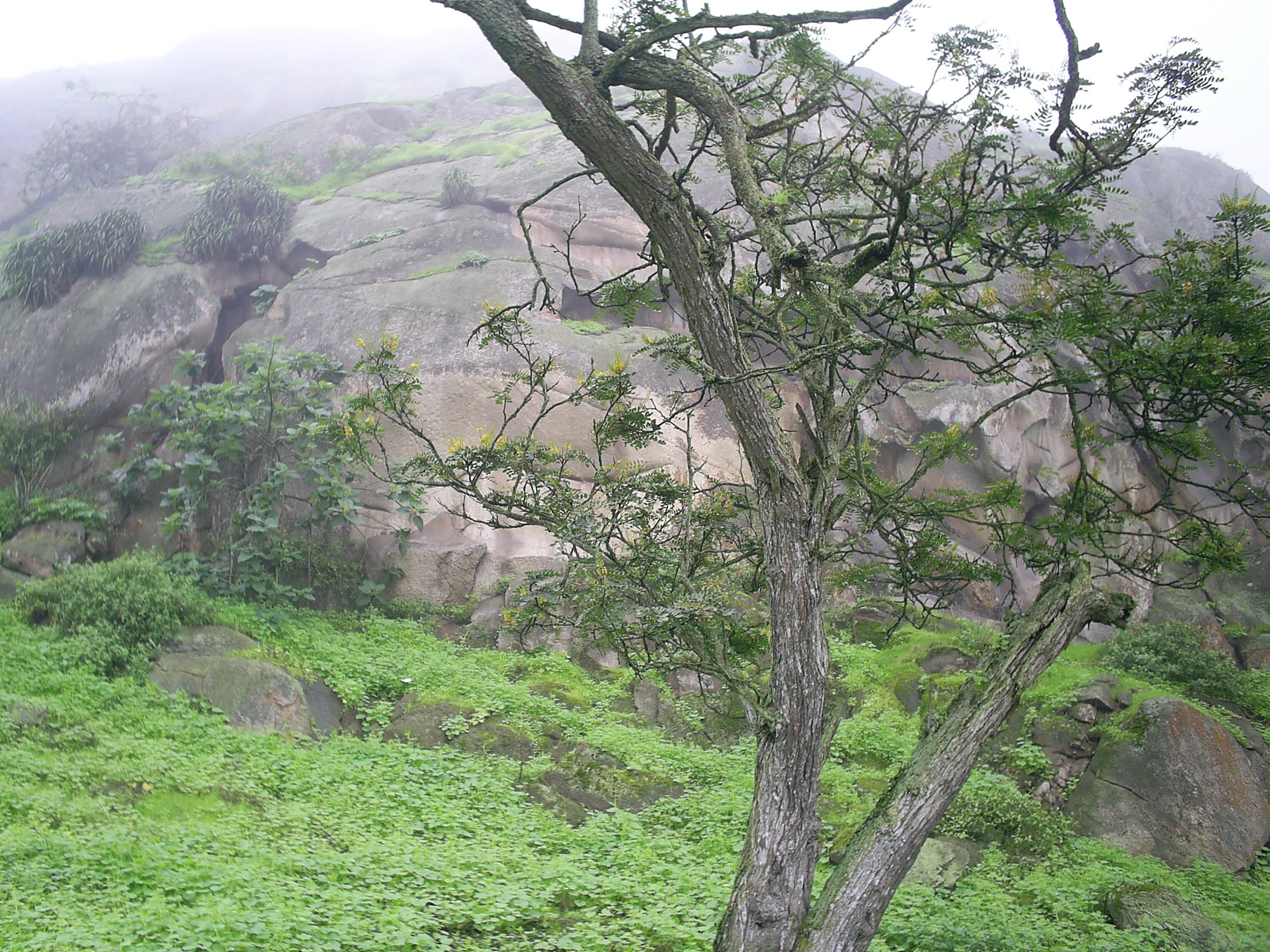
In fog oases called "lomas" the moisture from the garúa permits vegetation to flourish without rainfall.

The moisturizing impact of the fog is increased by the high average humidity of the coastal deserts. For example, Lima has an average humidity of 84 percent, more than double the average humidity of most deserts. As a result of the fog, Lima gets only 1,230 hours of sunshine annually, and less than 50 hours each in the months of July, August, and September. By contrast, Seattle, not noted for its sunny weather, receives 2,170 hours of sunshine annually and "foggy London town" receives 1,618 hours.

As elevation increases moving inland from Lima and other coastal locations, so also does precipitation. Chosica, 50 km (31 miles) inland from the Pacific at an elevation of 835 m (2,740 ft) gets 109 mm (4.3 in) annually of precipitation compared to Lima's precipitation of 16 mm (0.63 in). Matucana, 80 km (50 miles) inland at an elevation of 2,464 m (8,084 ft) gets 479 mm (18.9 in) of precipitation.

Apart from the irrigated agriculture in 57 river valleys coming down from the Andes and passing through the desert en route to the ocean, the coastal desert is almost without vegetation. In a few favored locations, where mountains come close to the sea and the fog condenses on the mountain slopes, the garúa permits vegetation to thrive in "fog oases," called lomas in Peru. Lomas range in size from very small to more than 40,000 ha (99,000 acres) and their flora includes many endemic species. Scholars have described individual lomas as "an island of vegetation in a virtual ocean of desert." Peru has more than 40 lomas totalling in area less than 2,000 km^{2} (770 sq mi) out of a total coastal desert area of 144,000 km^{2} (56,000 sq mi).

== Andean highlands ==
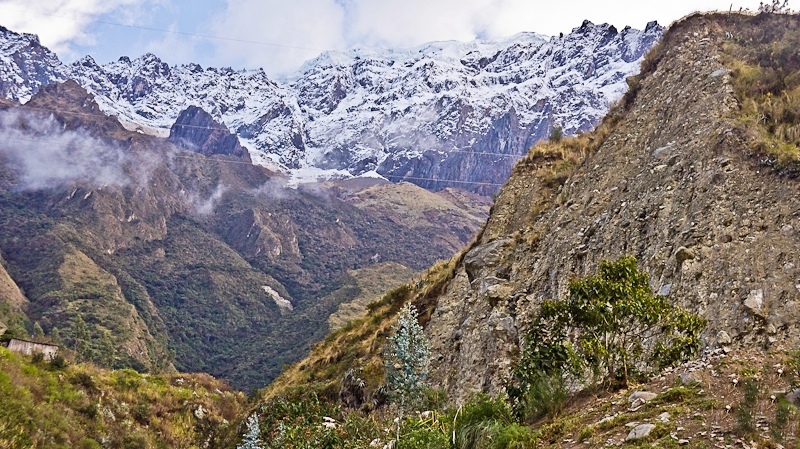
The Andes, from a sub-tropical forest to snow-capped peaks in one scene.

The chain of mountains called the Andes, comprising 28 percent of the national territory, runs the length of Peru, a narrow 80 km (50 miles) wide at the Ecuadorian border in the north and 350 km (220 miles) wide in the south along the border with Bolivia. The Andes, with elevations almost entirely above 2,000 m (6,600 ft) and mostly above 3,000 m (9,800 ft), rise above the desert to the west and the tropical rainforest to the east. The mountain climates are cool, often cold, with varied precipitation depending upon exposure. In general the western slopes of the Andes, facing the Pacific Ocean, are drier than the eastern slopes. Beginning at latitude 8.64° S and continuing southward are many snow-capped and glaciated peaks more that 5,000 m (16,000 ft) in elevation. Thirty-seven mountain peaks in Peru rise to more than 6,000 m (20,000 ft) in elevation.

A general rule for mountainous areas is that temperature decreases by about 6.5 °C (11.7 °F) for each 1,000 m (3,300 ft) increase in elevation provided that the change in altitude takes place at the same latitude and other factors such as precipitation and cloud cover are similar. The temperature decline with increasing elevation is less than the average on the Pacific coast side of the Andes because of the unusually low temperature of the fog-bound coast. The steep slopes and the sharp changes in elevation result in a large number of microclimates in which a change of location of a few kilometres can result in major climatic changes. The common precipitation regime of the Andes is a rainy summer season from October to April and a dry winter from May to September. Snow is common at elevations of more than 3,800 m (12,500 ft). The city of Puno at that elevation has snow 14 days per year on average and it has snowed in every month of the year except November. Puno experiences freezing temperatures an average of 226 mornings annually, with freezes occurring in every month and the permanent snow line is at about 5,000 m (16,000 ft).

The following table summarizes climatic statistics for cities in the Andes mountain region.

Andean climates
Department	Representative city	Latitude	Average annual temp.	Warmest month(s)	Coolest month(s)	Annual precipitation	Wettest month(s)	Climate (Köppen))
Cajamarca	Cajamarca	7.16° S	14.9 °C (58.8 °F)	15.8 °C (60.4 °F) (October, November)	13.4 °C (56.1 °F) (July)	760 mm (30 in)	February – 145 mm (5.7 in)	Cwb
Ayacucho	Ayacucho	13.16° S	17.5 °C (63.5 °F)	18.8 °C (65.8 °F) (October, November)	15.5 °C (59.9 °F) (July)	560 mm (22 in)	February – 110 mm (4.3 in)	Cwb
Huancavelica	Huancavelica	12.79° S	10.4 °C (50.7 °F)	11.5 °C (52.7 °F) (November)	8.7 °C (47.7 °F) (July)	790 mm (31 in)	February – 150 mm (5.9 in)	Cwb
Junín	Huancayo	12.07° S	11.8 °C (53.2 °F)	13.2 °C (55.8 °F) (October, November)	10.0 °C (50.0 °F) (July)	720 mm (28 in)	January – 140 mm (5.5 in)	Cwb
Huánuco	Huánuco	9.93° S	19.4 °C (66.9 °F)	20.7 °C (69.3 °F) (October)	18.0 °C (64.4 °F) (July)	460 mm (18 in)	February – 90 mm (3.5 in)	Cwb
Pasco	Cerro de Pasco	10.68° S	7.2 °C (45.0 °F)	8.6 °C (47.5 °F) (November)	5.5 °C (41.9 °F) (July)	980 mm (39 in)	February – 175 mm (6.9 in)	ET
Apurímac	Abancay	13.63° S	17.2 °C (63.0 °F)	18.5 °C (65.3 °F) (October)	15.7 °C (60.3 °F) (July)	690 mm (27 in)	January – 145 mm (5.7 in)	Cwb
Cusco	Cusco	13.53° S	11.8 °C (53.2 °F)	13.0 °C (55.4 °F) (November)	9.8 °C (49.6 °F) (July)	720 mm (28 in)	January – 160 mm (6.3 in)	Cwb
Puno	Puno	15.84° S	8.4 °C (47.1 °F)	10.2 °C (50.4 °F) (November)	6.3 °C (43.3 °F) (July)	710 mm (28 in)	January – 135 mm (5.3 in)	Cwb
Arequipa	Arequipa	16.40° S	15.8 °C (60.4 °F)	17.4 °C (63.3 °F) (November)	13.8 °C (56.8 °F) (July)	100 mm (3.9 in)	February – 30 mm (1.2 in)	BSk
Moquegua	Moquegua	17.19° S	18.2 °C (64.8 °F)	20.0 °C (68.0 °F) (February)	16.0 °C (60.8 °F) (July)	110 mm (4.3 in)	February – 35 mm (1.4 in)	BSk
Tacna	Tarata	17.47° S	11.3 °C (52.3 °F)	13.0 °C (55.4 °F) (November)	9.2 °C (48.6 °F) (July)	430 mm (17 in)	January – 110 mm (4.3 in)	Cwb

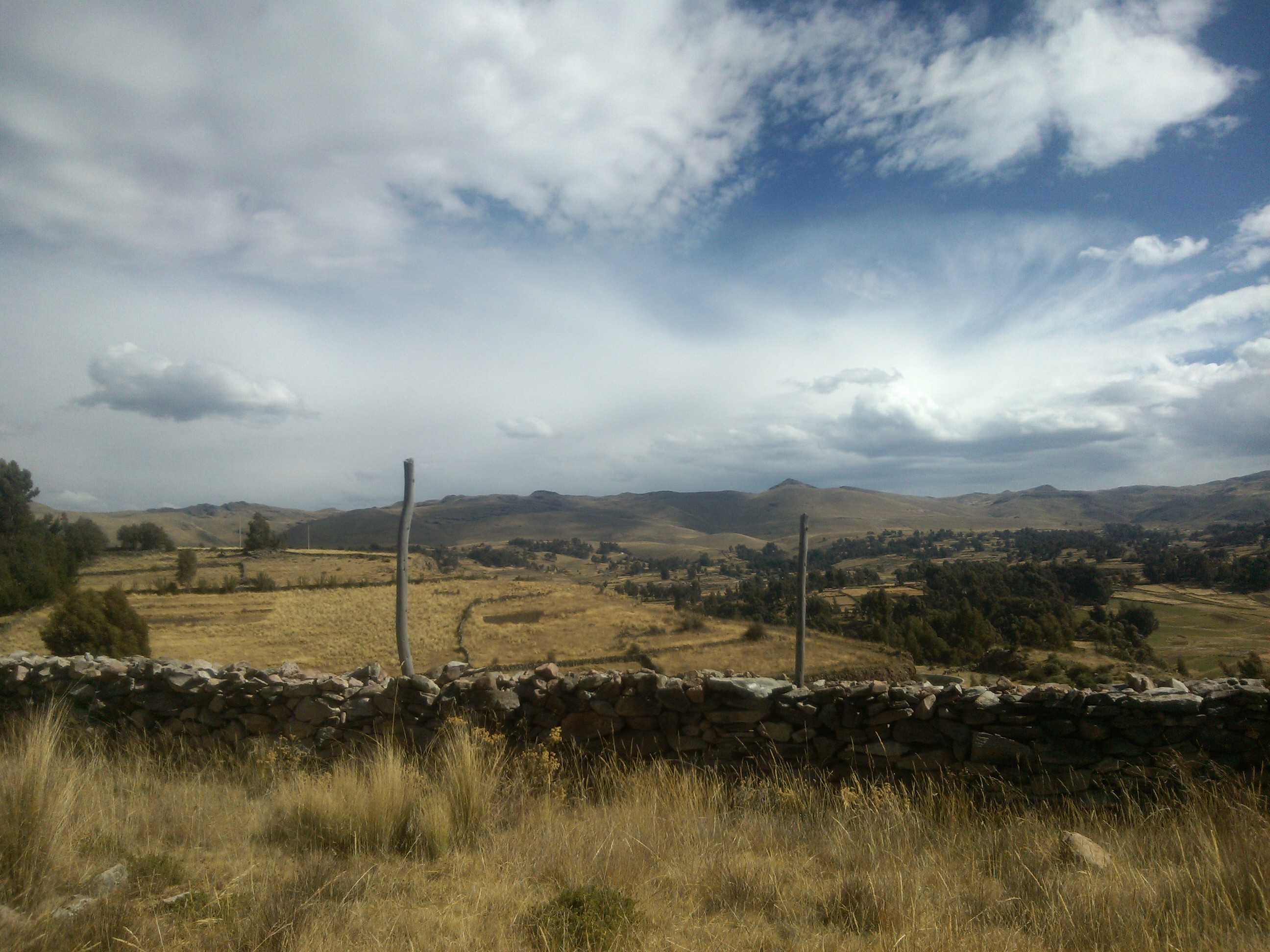
A typical scene in the Andes probably at an elevation of more than 3,000 m (9,800 ft).

The indigenous peoples of Peru have been farming in the Andes for thousands of years despite the severe climatic limitations. Compensating for the lack of a freeze-free growing season at elevations above 3,000 m (9,800 ft), indigenous farmers up until the 21st century have sought out microclimates and used techniques such as andenes (terraces) and Waru Waru (raised beds) to capture and store heat and permit hardy crops such as potatoes to grow up to 4,050 m (13,290 ft) in elevation. Llamas and alpacas are grazed on the sparse vegetation of the puna zone up to elevations of 4,770 m (15,650 ft).

== Amazon rainforest ==
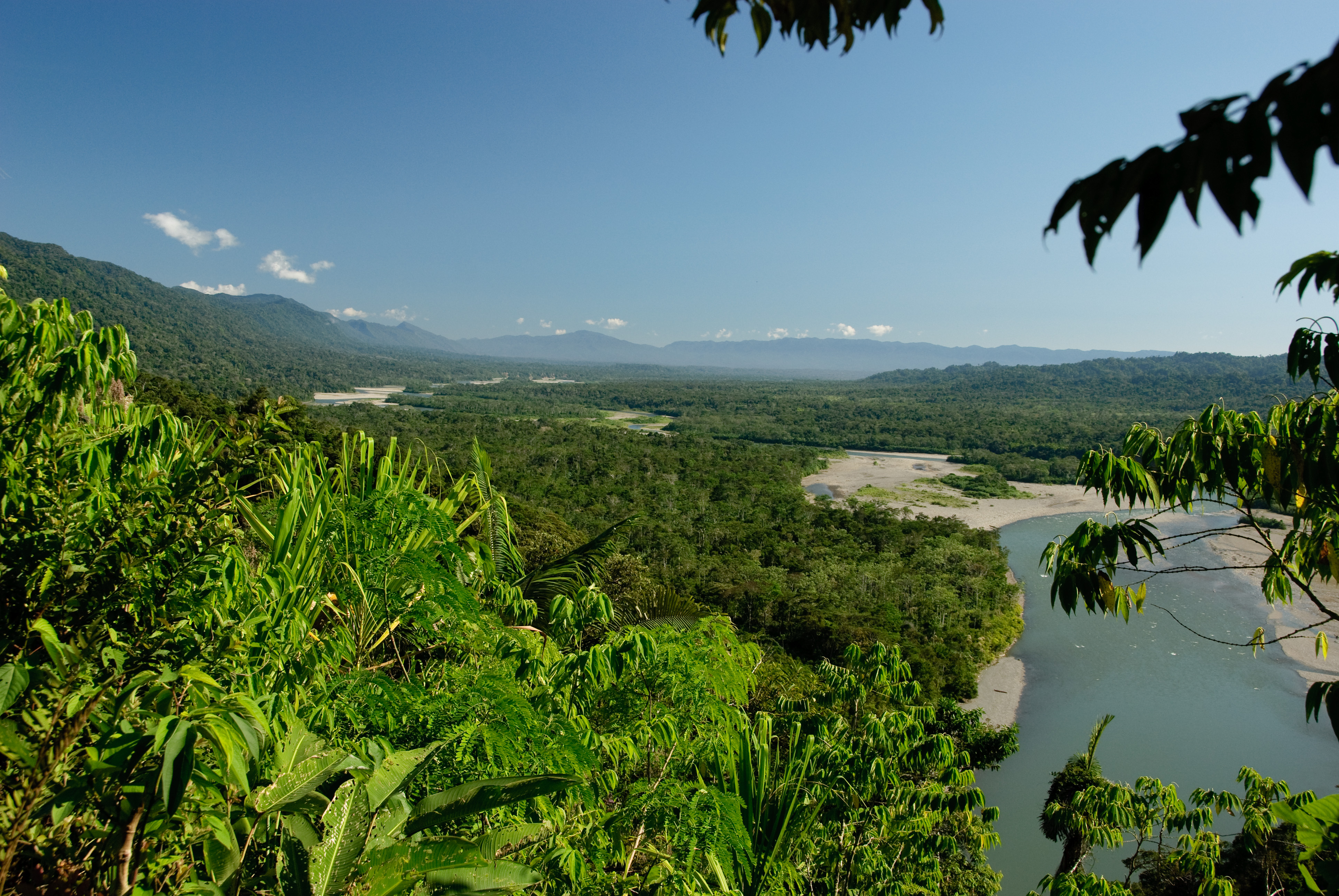
The Amazon rainforest in Manu National Park.

The Amazon rainforest region comprises about 60 percent of the total area of Peru and is characterized, as is the coast, by its climatic uniformity: hot average temperatures with little variation among the seasons and abundant precipitation. While there are locations that fit into all three of the Köppen tropical types of climate, Af, Am, and Aw, the differences among the three climates in Peru are small. The true tropical rainforest (Af) climate requires at least 60 mm (2.4 in) precipitation in all months of the year. Pucallpa (Am) has only one month that falls below that threshold; Puerto Esperanza (Aw) has three months below the Af threshold. The driest months are in the Southern Hemisphere's winter of June through August.

The dividing line between the Amazon and Andean climates is uncertain, but depends mostly on elevation. Temperatures become cooler with elevation and around 1,550 m (5,090 ft) elevation the climate becomes sub-tropical rather than tropical, a climate often characterized as "eternal spring." In Oxapampa, Cfb under the Köppen classification, temperatures rarely fall below 11 °C (52 °F) or rise above 26 °C (79 °F) and rain is abundant year-round. A few locations at elevations similar to Oxapampa have a pronounced dry season and are classified as Cwb (sub-tropical highland with a dry winter), rather than Cfb.

The following table summarizes climatic statistics for cities and towns in the Amazon rainforest region.

Amazon rainforest climates
Department	Representative city	Latitude	Average annual temp.	Hottest month(s)	Coolest month(s)	Annual precipitation	Wettest month(s)	Climate (Köppen)
Amazonas	Chachapoyas	6.23° S	18.3 °C (64.9 °F)	19.5 °C (67.1 °F) (October, November)	16.9 °C (62.4 °F) (July)	790 mm (31 in)	March – 130 mm (5.1 in)	Cwb
San Martín	Tarapoto	6.48° S	26.3 °C (79.3 °F)	27.8 °C (82.0 °F) (September, October)	24.9 °C (76.8 °F) (July)	1,150 mm (45 in)	March – 180 mm (7.1 in)	Af
Loreto	Iquitos	3.75° S	26.6 °C (79.9 °F)	27.6 °C (81.7 °F) (September)	25.6 °C (78.1 °F) (July)	3,050 mm (120 in)	April – 320 mm (13 in)	Af
Ucayali	Pucallpa	8.38° S	26.2 °C (79.2 °F)	27.8 °C (82.0 °F) (September)	24.8 °C (76.6 °F) (June, July)	1,600 mm (63 in)	February – 210 mm (8.3 in)	Af
Madre de Dios	Puerto Maldonado	12.59° S	25.8 °C (78.4 °F)	27.5 °C (81.5 °F) (October)	22.8 °C (73.0 °F) (July)	2,000 mm (79 in)	January – 290 mm (11 in)	Af

While Quince Mil has the highest precipitation of places in Peru with a weather station, climatologists say that the slopes of low mountains northwest of Quince Mil in Manu National Park may receive more than 8,000 mm (310 in) of rain annually.

== El Niño ==
El Niño (the "boy child") and La Niña (the "girl child") are the manifestations of the El Niño–Southern Oscillation which influences weather around the world, but especially near the coasts of northern Peru and southern Ecuador. The warm phase, El Niño, occurs every two to seven years. Ocean temperatures on the coast of Peru increase by as much as 3 °C (5.4 °F) during the Southern Hemisphere's summer, beginning about Christmas, the name El Niño referring to the birth of Jesus. El Niño brings warmer and sunnier weather to the coasts of Peru than normal. In especially impactful years, as occurred in 1982–1983, 1997–1998, and 2015–2017, El Niño causes heavy rainfall in coastal northern Peru in what is a desert that rarely receives any rain at all. Floods and landslides (huaycos) are the consequence; the warm water reduces fishing catches; and the southern Andes of Peru suffer reduced precipitation.

== Climate change ==
Climatic statistics cited in this article are for the period 1982-2012 and may become inaccurate in the future because of climate change and global warming. Average annual temperatures rose by 1 °C (1.8 °F) from 1960 until 2016 and are predicted to increase by an additional 2 to 3 °C (3.6 to 5.4 °F) by 2065. Sea level is projected to rise by 50 cm (20 in) by 2100. Extreme weather events, including drought and flood, are anticipated to become more frequent.

The most immediately visible problem of climatic change in Peru is the melting of glaciers in the Andes. Peru is home to 71 percent of the world's tropical glaciers and since 1970 glacial volume has decreased by 40 percent. Many areas of Peru depend upon glacial melt for water for consumption, irrigation, and industry. In the Cordillera Blanca, for example, glacial melt provides 80 percent of water in the rivers during the dry season and 4-8 percent during the rainy season. The consequence of increased glacial melt is floods during the wet season and less water in rivers during the dry season. The desert coast of Peru has 52 percent of Peru's population on 12 percent of its land area and is especially vulnerable to fluctuations in its water supply, nearly all of which comes from rivers originating in the Andes. Accelerated glacial melt and the eventual disappearance of glaciers will severely impact the quantity of water available in the coastal and mountain regions.

The Economic Commission for Latin America and the Caribbean (ECLAC) estimates that economic losses related to climate change for Peru could reach over 15% of national gross domestic product (GDP) by 2100. Being a large country with a long coastline, snow-capped mountains and sizeable forests, Peru's varying ecosystems are extremely vulnerable to climate change. Several mountain glaciers have already begun to retreat, leading to water scarcity in some areas. In the period between 1990 and 2015, Peru experienced a 99% increase in per capita carbon emissions from fossil fuel and cement production, marking one of the largest increases amongst South American countries.

Peru brought in a National Strategy on Climate Change in 2003. It is a detailed accounting of 11 strategic focuses that prioritize scientific research, mitigation of climate change effects on the poor, and creating Clean Development Mechanism (CDM) mitigation and adaptation policies.

In 2010, the Peruvian Ministry of Environment published a Plan of Action for Adaptation and Mitigation of Climate Change. The Plan categorises existing and future programmes into seven action groups, including: reporting mechanisms on GHG emissions, mitigation, adaptation, research and development of technology of systems, financing and management, and public education. It also contains detailed budget information and analysis relating to climate change.

In 2014, Peru hosted the Twentieth Conference of the Parties of the United Nations Framework Convention on Climate Change (UNFCCC COP20) negotiations. At the same time, Peru enacted a new climate law which provides for the creation of a national greenhouse gas inventory system called INFOCARBONO. According to the Low Emission Development Strategies Global Partnership (LEDS GP), INFOCARBONO is a major transformation of the country's greenhouse gas management system. Previously, the system was under the sole control of the Peruvian Ministry of the Environment. The new framework makes each relevant ministry responsible for their own share of greenhouse gas management.
