= Climate change in the Americas =

For details on climate change in North America, please see:

- Climate change in Canada
- Climate change in the Caribbean
- Climate change in Greenland
- Climate change in Grenada
- Climate change in Guatemala
- Climate change in Honduras
- Climate change in Mexico
- Climate change in Nicaragua
- Climate change in the United States

For details on climate change in South America, please see:

- Climate change in Argentina
- Climate change in Brazil
- Climate of Chile
- Climate change in Colombia
- Climate change in Ecuador
- Climate change in Guyana
- Climate change in Paraguay
- Climate change in Peru
- Climate change in Suriname
- Climate change in Uruguay
- Climate change in Venezuela
