= 2022–2023 Uruguay drought =

Natural disaster in Uruguay

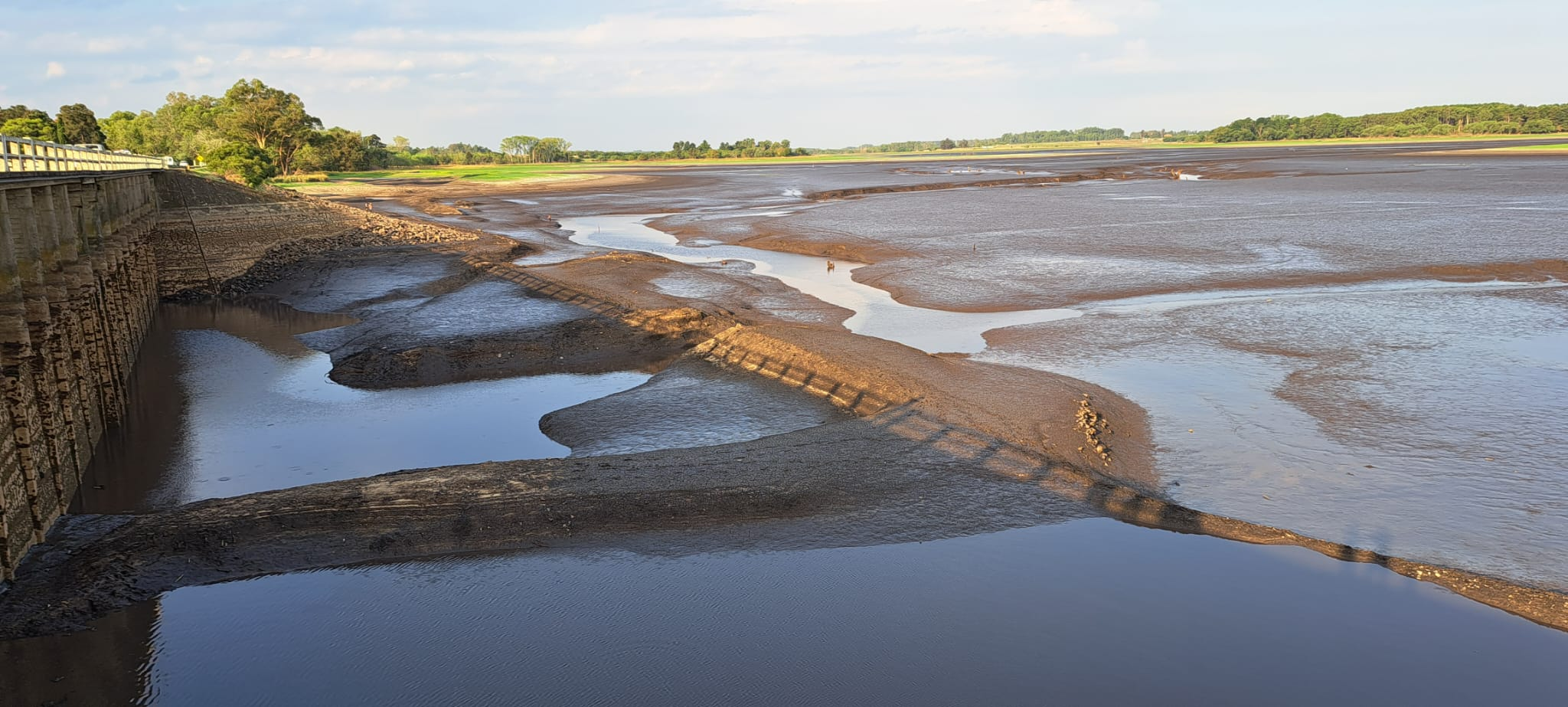
- The Canelón Grande Reservoir, one of the main water supplies for Montevideo ran completely dry in March 2023.
- Date: 2022-2023 (State of agricultural emergency: October 2022 – April 2023) (State of national emergency: 20 June 2023 – 30 August 2023)
- Location: Uruguay
- Type: Water drought
- Cause: • Lack of precipitation caused by La Niña • Rising temperatures via climate change

The drought or water crisis in Uruguay from 2022 to 2023 was an event of abnormally low rainfall attributed to the La Niña phenomenon, which had major effects in Uruguayan economy and water supply.

The peak of the crisis occurred during the winter of 2023, when the reservoirs that supplied drinking water to the Montevideo metropolitan area ran almost completely dry. The Santa Lucía River, which supplies drinking water to almosts 2/3 of the Uruguayan population, reduced its volume significantly allowing brackish water to flow upstream and reach the water treatment plant of Aguas Corrientes, this caused major disruptions when such brackish water had to be distributed to the cities. The Uruguayan government then began notifying daily about the sodium and chloride concentrations measured in the water supply and the volume of water left in storage at the Paso Severino Reservoir.

The water shortage resulted in significant impacts on the local economy, and large portions of the population not having direct access to drinkable water.

While the drought began in 2018, the situation significantly deteriorated in early 2023, affecting more than 60% of Uruguay's territory with extreme or severe drought conditions between October 2022 and February 2023. Precipitation during this period was below average. This prolonged drought led to agricultural losses exceeding $1 billion and complications in the availability of drinking water. By the end of January 2023, before the water crisis in the metropolitan area, the drought had already impacted 75,000 people across five departments in the country's interior.

To address this crisis, the national government declared a state of agricultural emergency in October 2022, extending until the end of April 2023. The drought resulted in reduced access to drinking water and financial losses for agricultural producers. Following a lack of reduction of water usage and a lack of projected rainfall, the national water management authority started using brackish water in municipal water supply for 60% of the population in May 2023. The water had twice the level of salinity recommend by WHO.

== Background ==
Uruguay has faced multiple droughts in recent years, with the most severe occurring in 2008/09 and 2018. In 2018 alone, these droughts resulted in estimated economic losses of $500 million in Uruguay and $3.4 billion in Argentina. Furthermore, the lack of rainfall in early 2023 significantly reduced water availability and access in Uruguay, affecting over 75,000 people.

To tackle these challenges, Uruguayan farmers have been investing in technology to combat droughts and minimize their impact on crop yields. However, despite their efforts, agricultural production is still being affected by climate change, with dry weather conditions projected to persist until January 2023.

Since the early 2000s, Uruguay has been implementing policies to manage climate risks, shifting from a disaster-focused approach to a risk management approach. These policies include the establishment of early warning systems for extreme weather events and the enhancement of irrigation systems for agricultural production.

== Fires ==
Fires caused by drought have been a major issue in Uruguay since 2018. The lack of rainfall has significantly reduced water availability and access, affecting 20.51% of the country's territory.

Uruguay is currently experiencing high temperatures and scarce rainfall during the summer season, leading to recurring fires, particularly in forests. The Parliament is discussing a forestry bill that contains important measures to prevent these fires.

Due to the dry season, many Argentine farmers have changed their planting strategies by postponing the sowing of seeds in anticipation of more rain.

== Montevideo water shortage crisis ==
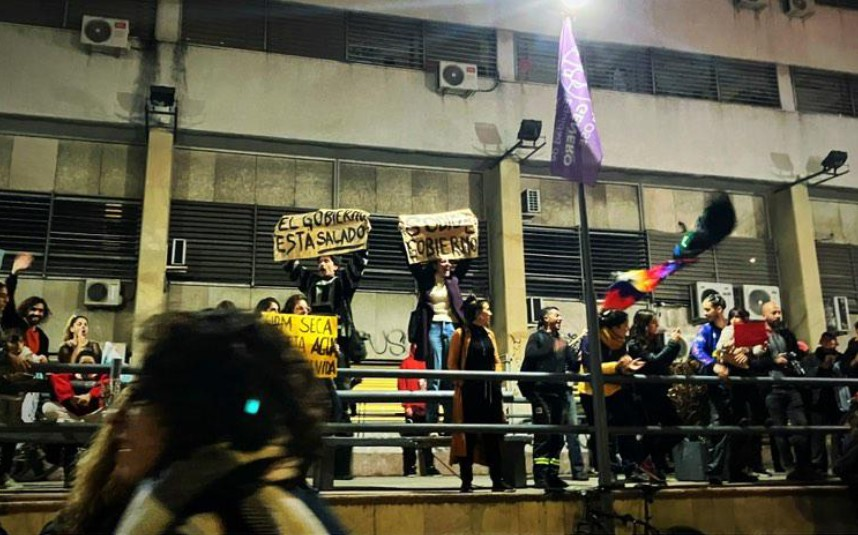
Protests in May 2023 in Montevideo due to the situation of increased salinity in drinking water caused by low freshwater reserves.

Measures were implemented in 2017 to address the country's water crisis, including the establishment of a National Water Plan. This plan aims to ensure sustainable development and access to safe drinking water for all citizens. In 2019, the World Bank granted loans exceeding $141 million to support the plan and improve the financial sustainability of water and sanitation services in Uruguay.

In October 2022, the Ministry of Agriculture, Livestock, and Fisheries (MGAP) declared a 90-day state of agricultural emergency nationwide due to drought conditions.

The lack of rainfall in early 2023 significantly reduced water availability and access throughout the country. This drought had severe consequences for affected communities, particularly those reliant on agriculture. The government and aid organizations provided assistance to those affected by this emergency.

Complicating matters further, over 60% of Uruguayan territory experienced extreme or severe drought from October 2022 to January 2023. This led to calls for citizens to use water responsibly as reserves diminish.

== See also ==
- Climate change in Uruguay
- 2023–2024 South American drought
- 2022 Southern Cone heat wave
- Effects of climate change on agriculture
