= Climate change in Uruguay =

Climate change in Uruguay describes the effects of climate change in Uruguay. As the result of global temperature increases, Uruguay is expected to have temperature increases of 3 °C by about 2100 and there is expected increases in precipitation. Increases of climate rain in Uruguay and Argentina during 2018 was estimated by the World Meteorological organization to have caused $2.5 billion in damage.

The main sources of carbon emissions in Uruguay are food production and transport. When compared to the rest of the world, Uruguay only contributes 0.05% of the total global emissions. In 2017, Uruguay identified 106 methods of reducing emissions as part of their Nationally Determined Contributions to the Paris Climate Agreement. Activities include reductions of emissions across food and grain production, increases of native and reforested land, restoration of bogland and grasslands as carbon sinks. The Nationally Determined Contribution began a process of revision in 2020 with the objective to provide greater ambition in 2022.

To pursue climate policy, the country created on the 20th of May 2009, the Sistema Nacional de Respuesta al Cambio Climático y variabilidad (SNRCC) through directive 238/09. The SNRCC produces reportes from monitoring and verification of the work to achieve the Nationally Determined Contribution and other policies.

In 2015, a law transformed that organization into a Secretariat for Environment, Water and Climate change. The Secretariat is charged with coordinating public policy across the three areas. The secretary participates in the committee of other actors in the National Environmental System (in Spanish, Sistema Nacional Ambiental (SNA)). Internationally, Uruguay is part of the Kyoto Protocol, Paris Accorde and the Doha Amendment. The private sector in Uruguay has committed to at least 15 actions to mitigate the effects of climate change, according to the NAZCA portal. Uruguay is also a member of the International Renewable Energy Agency.

== Emissions inventory ==
In 2019 Uruguay emitted 6,170 Gg of CO_{2}. The largest source of emissions in Uruguay is transportation with 3,670 Gg of CO_{2} en 2019, with the second being industry (915 Gg), and the sectors of agriculture, fishing and minerals 484 Gg. The energy sector emits 610 Gg.

== Environmental impacts ==
=== Changes to temperature and Climate ===
Köppen climate classification map for Uruguay for 1980–2016

2071–2100 map under the most intense climate change scenario. Mid-range scenarios are currently considered more likely

== Mitigation and adaptation methods ==
The national system for managing public policy for climate change is the Sistema Nacional de Respuesta al Cambio Climático y variabilidad (SNRCC), the Sistema Nacional Ambiental, the Gabinete Nacional Ambiental and the Secretaría Nacional de Ambiente, Agua y Cambio Climático. In 2010 the parties created the National Climate Change Response Plan (Plan Nacional de Respuesta al Cambio Climático).In 2017, they extended and adapted the plan into a national policy for implementing their Nationally Determined Contribution .

== Climate finance ==
For the period of 2015–2021, Uruguay received approximately US$1,153,103,861.08 of climate finance focused on funding mitigation in agriculture, urban mobility and other environmental institutions and programs.

== Society and culture ==
In 2020, a survey of 1500 people in Uruguay, found that 90% of Uruguayans knew climate change was a problem and important for Uruguay to address .

== See also ==
- 2022-2023 Uruguay drought
- 2022 Southern Cone heat wave
