= Climate change in the Caribbean =

Emissions, impacts and responses of the Caribbean region related to climate change

Climate change today encompasses not only global warming, which refers to the alarming and continuous rise in the planet's average surface temperature, but also the extensive and multifaceted impacts this phenomenon has on Earth's climate. These effects are manifested in various ways, including altered weather patterns, increased frequency and intensity of extreme weather events, melting ice caps, rising sea levels, and shifts in ecosystem dynamics. Climate change accounts for historical long-term fluctuations in Earth's climate, highlighting the natural variability of climate over millennia but underscoring the unprecedented rate of current change attributed to human activities.

Graph showing historic temperature change globally and in the Caribbean region.

Climate change presents significant risks to the Caribbean islands. Key environmental changes anticipated in the region include rising sea levels, more intense hurricanes, longer dry seasons, and shorter wet seasons. As a result, climate change is likely to impact the economy, which is heavily dependent on tourism, the environment, and the population of the Caribbean.

== Geography ==
The Caribbean is an archipelago of islands between North and South America. These islands include Antigua, Aruba, Barbados, Bonaire, the Cayman Islands, Cuba, Curaçao, Dominica, Guadeloupe, Grenada, Hispaniola, Jamaica, Martinique, Montserrat, Puerto Rico, Saba, Saint Croix, Sint Eustatius, Saint John, Saint Kitts, Saint Lucia, Saint Thomas, Saint Vincent, Sint Maarten, the Bahamas, Tortola, and Trinidad and Tobago. The average annual temperature of the Caribbean is 30.2 °C (86.4 °F).

== Impacts on the natural environment ==
=== Temperature and weather changes ===
Köppen climate classification map for the Caribbean for 1980–2016

2071–2100 map under the most intense climate change scenario. Mid-range scenarios are currently considered more likely

Climate change's increase of water temperatures intensified peak wind speeds in all eleven 2024 Atlantic hurricanes.

==== Extreme weather events ====
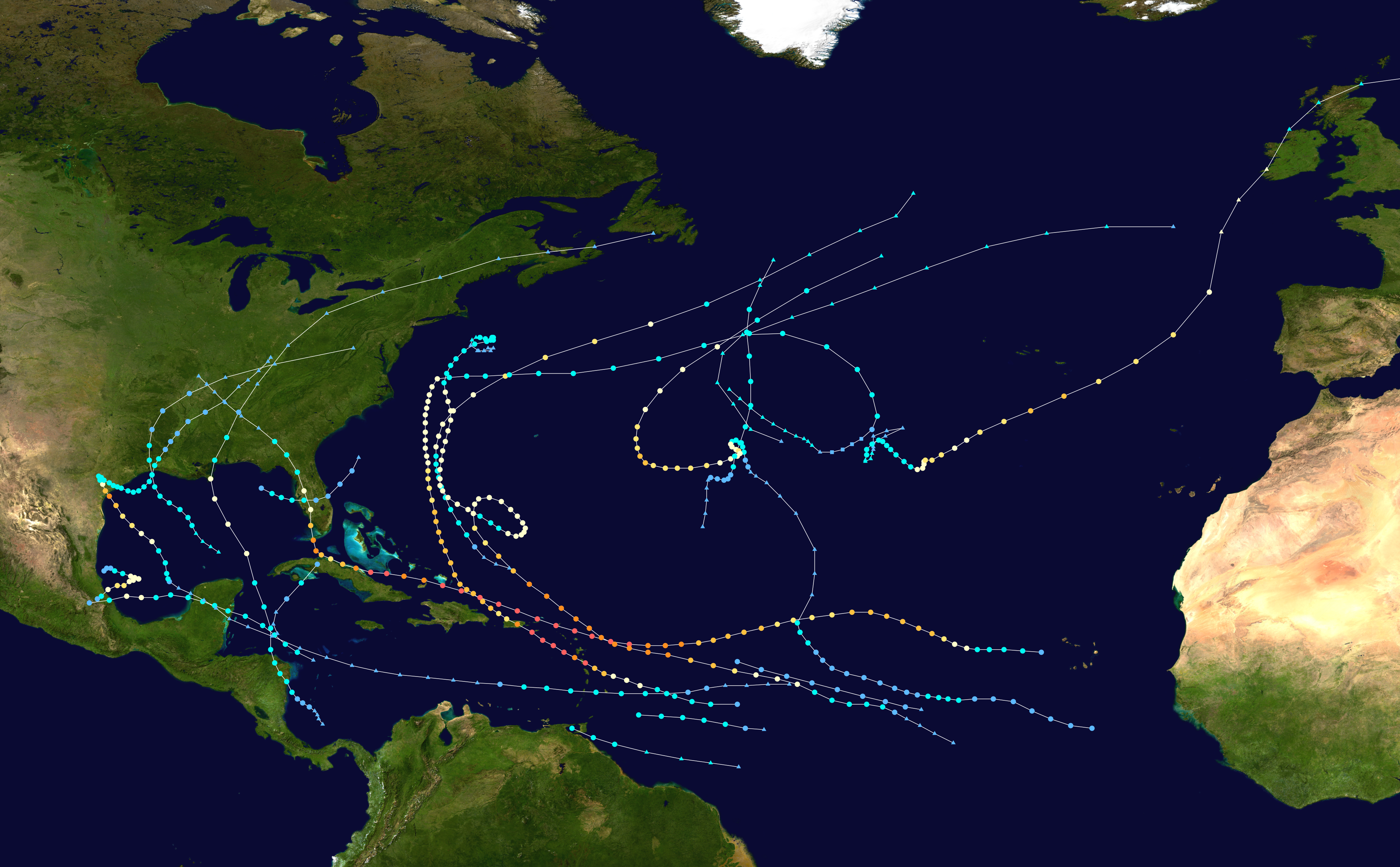
Summary map of the 2017 Atlantic hurricane season

An increase in air and sea surface temperatures is expected to lead to the formation of stronger tropical cyclones. Warm air sea surface temperatures are key factors in the development of hurricanes. As temperatures rise, the likelihood of a storm intensifying into a hurricane also increases. This warmth provides the energy that fuels the hurricane's development, creating stronger, more frequent hurricanes.

In September 2017, the United States National Hurricane Center reported that the North Atlantic basin was highly active with four tropical storms forming, all of which developed into hurricanes. They noted a record high number of tropical storms that transitioning into hurricanes that year. Among these storms, Hurricane Irma and Hurricane Maria struck the Caribbean islands. Both hurricanes reached Category 5 status. The average temperature in Caribbean waters is 27°C (81°F). NASA reported that when hurricane Irma formed, the sea surface temperature in the Caribbean was 30°C (86°F). The required temperature for the development of a major storm is suggested to be higher than 27 °C (80 °F).

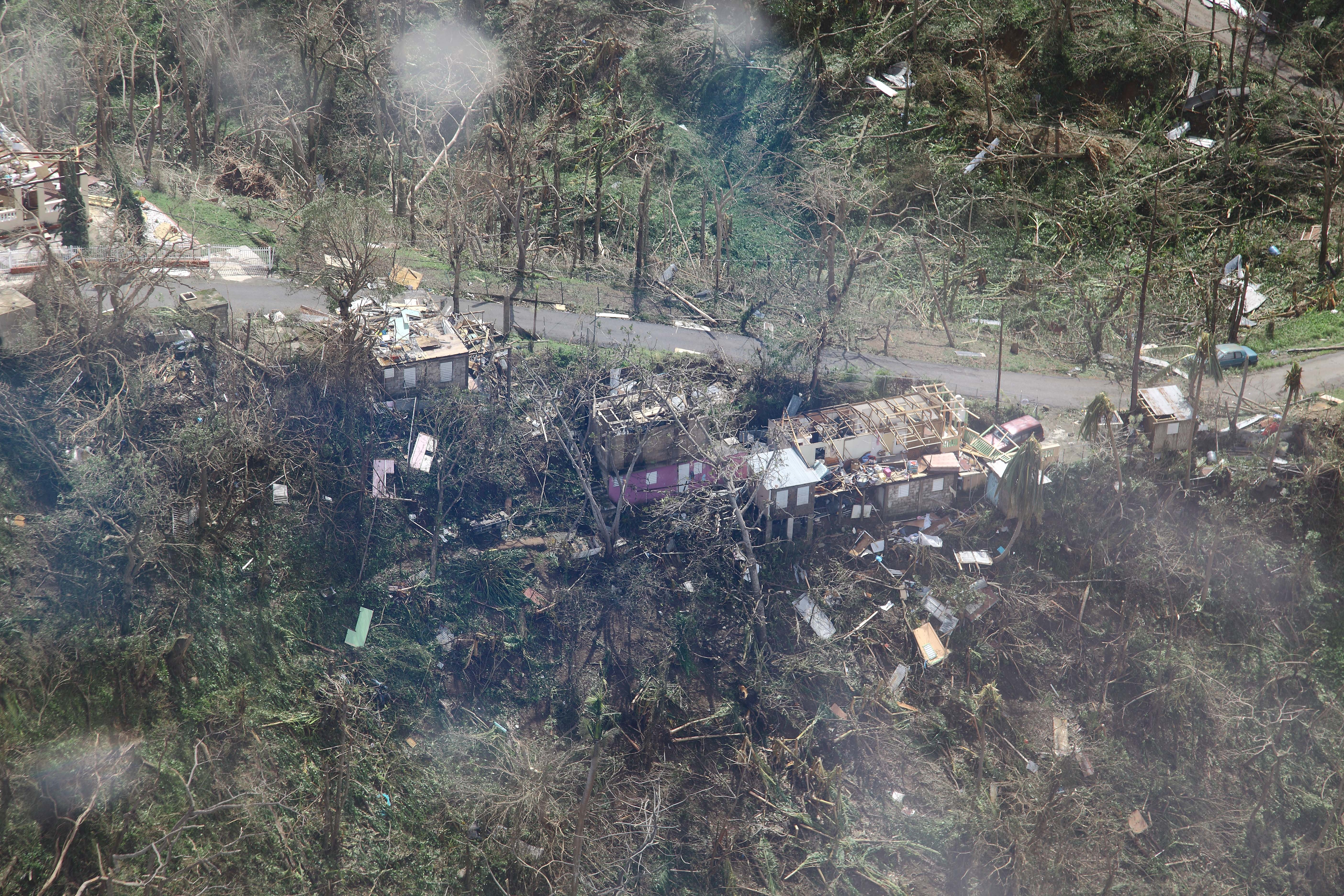
Destroyed homes after Hurricane Maria in Puerto Rico

Hurricanes classified as category 5 have wind speeds exceeding 253 kilometres per hour (157 mph). Hurricane Maria recorded maximum sustained winds of 281.6 kilometres per hour (175 mph), while Hurricane Irma reached maximum sustained winds of 297.7 kilometres per hour (185 mph). In addition to their extreme winds, Hurricanes Irma and Maria produced significantly more rainfall than previous storms. Warmer air temperatures, allow the atmosphere to hold more moisture, which leads to increased precipitation. Multiple sources indicate that the recent strengthening and increased precipitation of hurricanes can be attributed to climate change.

Hurricane Irma and Maria had a total of 510 millimetres (20 in) of rainfall. In Cuba, Hurricane Irma sustained precipitation was 270 millimetres (10.8 in) per hour. In Puerto Rico, Hurricane Maria had a sustained precipitation of 164 millimetres (6.44 in) per hour.

Increased temperature has caused repeated and prolonged droughts, an increase in the number of very hot days, intense rainfall events causing repeated localized flooding, and rising sea levels that consume the beaches on which tourism in the region depends. A temperature rise of 2°C above preindustrial levels can increase the likelihood of extreme hurricane rainfall by 4–5 times in the Bahamas, 3 times in Cuba and Dominican Republic. Even to the richest nations in the region, it takes 6 years to recover from such event.

=== Ecosystems ===
Coral reefs are crucial to the Caribbean Ocean and play an essential role in the ecosystem. They provide critical habitat for marine life, serve as a natural barrier against storms, and significantly contribute to the economy through tourism and fishing. Additionally, coral is utilized as a natural resource by local communities, being used in the production of cement and aggregate.

The rise in water surface temperature has had a significant impact on coral reefs. In 2005 a model-based assessment was conducted to evaluate the effects of human-induced climate change on the Caribbean. The findings of this study suggest that increasing sea surface temperatures have led to widespread coral bleaching. Coral bleaching occurs when corals lose their symbiotic algae and photosynthetic pigments, leading to a white appearance. This loss of pigmentation can result from various stressors, including changes in water temperature, light, salinity, or nutrient levels. This is an effect of the change in climate because of the rise in water temperature in the seawater.

The study indicated that the increase in sea surface temperature was attributed to human activity. It concluded that it is highly unlikely that natural climate variability alone could explain this event. Their model indicated that, without human influence, such an event would occur only once every 1,000 years.

=== Sea level rise ===
Rising sea levels due to climate change are expected to contribute to coastal erosion. According to NASA, sea levels are projected to increase by 0.3–1 metre (1–4 ft) by 2050. By 2100, sea levels in the Caribbean are anticipated to rise by 1.4 metres.

This rise in sea level could significantly impact coastal communities in the Caribbean, particularly those located less than 3 metres (10 ft) above the sea. It is estimated that between 29 and 32 million people in Latin America and the Caribbean could be affected because they live below this threshold. The Bahamas and Trinidad and Tobago are expected to be the most impacted, as at least 80% of the total land area lies below the sea level.

The islands provide crucial nesting sites and habitats for sea turtles, which are all at risk of endangerment due to coastal erosion and environmental changes throughout their life cycles. Damage to the beaches can negatively affect turtles that nest in the Caribbean. Additionally, sea level rise can influence where sea turtles choose to nest and alter nesting behavior.

Coastal losses in the 22 largest cities of Latin America and the Caribbean are estimated to range between US$940 million and US$1.2 billion. Key sources of income, particularly tourism, will be impacted, as many major tourist attractions, such as beaches and hotels, are located along the coast. A study conducted in 2004 reported that 12 million tourists had visited the Caribbean that year.

== Impacts on people ==
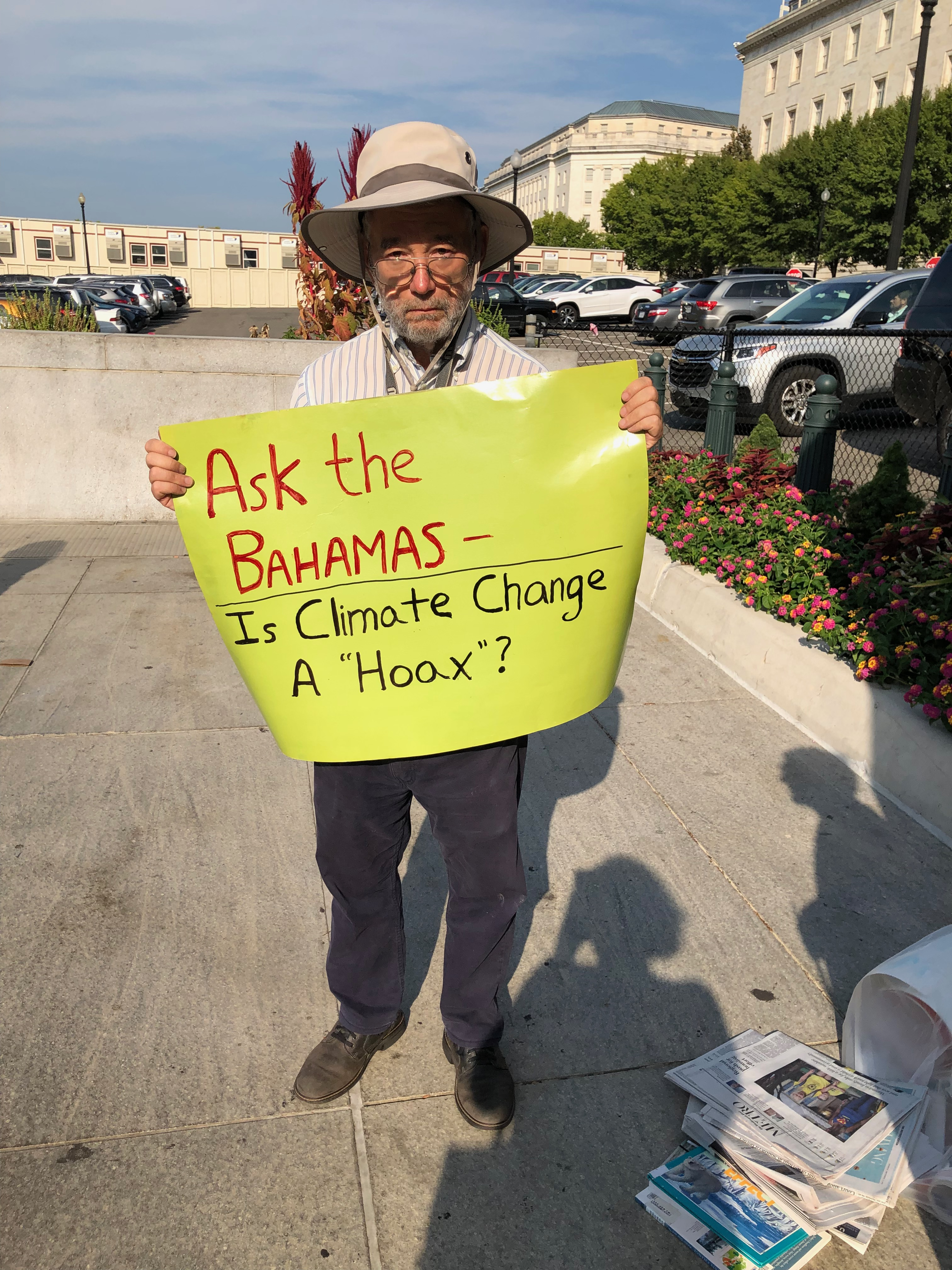
A climate change protester in Washington, D.C. holding a placard drawing attention to The Bahamas.

Multiple sources indicate that the Caribbean is facing significant challenges in addressing climate change. The long history of colonialism, particularly focused on the extraction of goods like sugar, has hindered the economic development of these islands. As a result, many Caribbean nations find it difficult to compete in the current global economy. This longstanding colonial legacy has created a cycle of dependency, leaving many Caribbean economies reliant on global powers.

The damages expected from climate change will weaken the economy of various islands as it will target some of the major sources of income, like tourism. It has been estimated that 25% to 35% of the Caribbean's economy relies on tourism. Tourism could be significantly reduced if less tourists travel to the Caribbean due to increasing damage from hurricanes in the next century. It is expected that costs from hurricanes are expected to range between US$350 million to $550 million or about 11% to 17% of the current GDP annually. The Bahamas, Haiti, and Jamaica are expected to be the islands most affected by a decline in tourism. Additionally, agricultural and rural areas in the Caribbean will face significant challenges due to climate change. By 2025 the damage costs in these regions could reach approximately US$3 million per year, and by 2100, they may increase to between US$12 million – $15 million.

== Effects of climate change on human health ==
Climate change is considered one of the most significant public health challenges facing small island developing states in the Caribbean. Rising temperatures, more frequent extreme weather events, droughts, flooding, and sea-level rise can affect human health in several ways. highlighted the need for more research in the Caribbean on climate-sensitive diseases, vulnerable groups, health system resilience, and disease surveillance. The World Meteorological Organization also reported that communities and food systems across Latin America and the Caribbean continue to experience the effects of extreme heat, drought, flooding, and tropical cyclones.

=== Extreme heat ===
Increasing temperatures can have serious consequences for human health. Exposure to extreme heat may result in dehydration, heat exhaustion, and heatstroke, while also worsening pre-existing conditions such as cardiovascular and kidney diseases. Individuals who spend long periods outdoors, older adults, and people with chronic illnesses are especially vulnerable. As temperatures continue to rise, heat exposure is becoming an increasingly important occupational and public health concern.

=== Vector-borne diseases ===
Changes in temperature and rainfall patterns can influence the behaviour and survival of disease vectors such as mosquitoes. As a result, climate change may affect the transmission patterns of diseases like dengue fever. However, climate is only one factor involved. Conditions such as sanitation, housing quality, water storage practices, vector control measures, and human movement also play important roles in determining disease transmission.

=== Food and waterborne diseases ===
Flooding can contaminate drinking water sources, damage sanitation systems, and disrupt food supplies. Similarly, drought conditions can reduce access to safe and reliable water. These situations may increase human exposure to waterborne and food-borne pathogens, creating additional public health risks. According to Hassan, the level of risk often depends on factors such as water treatment systems, sanitation infrastructure, food handling practices, and disaster preparedness.

=== Food security and nutrition ===
Climate-related events such as droughts, floods, and prolonged periods of extreme heat can negatively affect agricultural production. Reduced crop yields and disruptions in food supply chains may increase food prices and limit access to nutritious foods, particularly for lower-income households and farming communities. emphasized the importance of climate-resilient food systems and coordinated adaptation strategies to protect food security and public health throughout the Caribbean.

== Effects of climate change on Animal health ==
Climate change also poses significant challenges to animal health and livestock production. Rising temperatures, changing rainfall patterns, extreme weather events, and shifts in disease occurrence can all affect animal welfare and productivity. These impacts have important implications for food security and farmers' livelihoods. Recent studies have highlighted the need to incorporate climate adaptation measures into animal health and agricultural planning.

=== Heat stress ===
High temperatures combined with humidity can make it difficult for animals to regulate their body temperature. Heat stress often leads to reduced feed intake, slower growth, lower reproductive performance, and decreased milk production. Long-term exposure may also weaken the immune system and negatively affect animal welfare. These challenges are particularly important in tropical regions where livestock are frequently exposed to hot and humid conditions.

=== Water and feed availability ===
Changes in rainfall patterns, including prolonged droughts and periods of heavy rainfall, can affect the availability of pasture, feed, and water resources. As a result, animals may experience dehydration, poor nutrition, reduced productivity, and reproductive difficulties. suggested that climate adaptation strategies should include reliable water sources, improved forage production, and adequate feed reserves to support livestock during adverse conditions.

=== Infectious diseases ===
Climate variability can influence both disease vectors and the environmental conditions needed for disease survival and transmission. reported associations between climate factors and changes in the distribution, prevalence, and risk of infectious diseases in animals. However, these relationships vary according to the disease, host species, and geographical region. Because some animal diseases can also infect humans, these changes are an important One Health concern. Climate-informed veterinary surveillance and stronger collaboration between animal and public health sectors can help improve early detection and response efforts.

=== Extreme weather events ===
Hurricanes, flooding, and landslides can cause direct and indirect losses to livestock systems. Animals may be injured or killed, while housing facilities, fencing, feed supplies, and veterinary services may also be disrupted. Such events can make it difficult for farmers to maintain adequate standards of animal care and welfare. Consequently, livestock disaster preparedness should form part of broader agricultural and community resilience planning.

=== Reproductive health ===
Extended periods of heat exposure can negatively affect animal reproduction and overall physiological function. Reduced feed intake and lower milk production are commonly reported, particularly in dairy cattle. Heat stress may also weaken immune responses, resulting in poorer health and welfare outcomes. The severity of these impacts depends on factors such as species, breed, age, production level, nutritional status, and environmental conditions.

=== Food production and food safety ===
Climate-related stresses can reduce livestock productivity and affect the reliability of meat, milk, and egg production systems. Environmental changes may also influence the occurrence and spread of infectious diseases, particularly those with zoonotic potential. For this reason, integrating climate information into veterinary surveillance and food safety planning is increasingly important for protecting both animal and human health.

=== One Health approach ===
The One Health approach recognizes that human, animal, and environmental health are closely interconnected. Effective responses to climate-related health challenges require cooperation among public health agencies, veterinary services, agricultural authorities, and environmental organizations. Such collaboration can strengthen surveillance systems, support early warning mechanisms, improve emergency preparedness, and guide climate adaptation efforts. stressed the importance of interdisciplinary research and monitoring of climate-sensitive health outcomes, while highlighted the value of integrating animal health surveillance into broader One Health strategies for managing climate-related disease risks.

== Adaptation and mitigation ==
In Central America, and the Caribbean, climate change poses significant threats to agriculture, as the region experiences frequent droughts, cyclones and the impacts of the El Niño- Southern-Oscillation. There are various adaptation strategies available, and these can differ greatly from one country to another. Many of the adjustments made are primarily focused on agriculture or water supply. Some effective adaptive strategies include restoring degraded lands, rearranging land uses across different areas, diversifying livelihoods, adjusting sowing dates, improving water harvest techniques, and even migration. However, the lack of available resources remains a barrier to more substantial adaptations, meaning that the changes implemented are often incremental.

One solution that researchers propose for reducing CO_{2} emissions is to increase the market price of carbon. By raising the price of carbon, signals can be sent to consumers to decrease their consumption of carbon-intensive goods and services. It also encourages producers to seek alternatives to carbon-intensive inputs and creates market incentives for innovation and the adoption of low-carbon products and processes.

Addressing CO_{2} emissions is crucial for slowing down climate change in the long term, the true costs of climate change remain uncertain. This uncertainty stems from potential future technological advancements, the irreversible nature of policies aimed at tackling climate change, and the existence of non-market goods and services that are vulnerable to its effects. Researchers emphasize that the primary challenge in addressing climate change is the lack of enforceable policies.

== By country and territory ==
=== Grenada ===
Climate change in Grenada has received significant public and political attention in Grenada. As of 2013, the mitigation of its effects has been high on the agenda of the Government of Grenada, which seeks to set an example through innovation and green technology.

=== Haiti ===
Haiti's position as a southern island nation makes it particularly susceptible to the effects of climate change. Factors that make Haiti more vulnerable than other Caribbean nations, such as the Dominican Republic, are its higher population density, extensive deforestation, extreme soil erosion, and high income-inequality. Several effects of increased intensity of tropical storms, depleted coral reefs, and desertification. Since 1960 the mean annual rainfall has decreased by 5mm per month per decade, and mean temperatures have increased by 0.45 °C. The combination of increased temperatures and decreased rainfall will likely lead to the intensification of drought conditions, especially in the centre of the country. According to the IPCC climate change predictions for 2050, more than 50% of Haiti will be in danger of desertification. The frequency of hot days and nights has increased, while the frequency of cold days and nights have steadily decreased. Sea-level rise is projected to rise between 0.13 and 0.56 m by 2090. The US Climate Change Science program estimates that with each 1 °C increase in temperature, hurricane rainfall will increase by 6–17% and hurricane wind speeds will increase by 1–8%.

=== Puerto Rico ===
Climate change has had large impacts on the ecosystems and landscapes of the US territory Puerto Rico. According to a 2019 report by Germanwatch, Puerto Rico is the most affected by climate change. The territory's energy consumption is mainly derived from imported fossil fuels.

The Puerto Rico Climate Change Council (PRCCC) noted severe changes in seven categories: air temperature, precipitation, extreme weather events, tropical storms and hurricanes, ocean acidification, sea surface temperatures, and sea level rise.

Climate change also affects Puerto Rico's population, the economy, human health, and the number of people forced to migrate.

Surveys have shown climate change is a matter of concern for most Puerto Ricans. The territory has enacted laws and policies concerning climate change mitigation and adaptation, including the use of renewable energy. Local initiatives are working toward mitigation and adaptation goals, and international aid programs support reconstruction after extreme weather events and encourage disaster planning.

=== US Virgin Islands ===
Climate change in the United States Virgin Islands encompasses the effects of climate change, attributed to man-made increases in atmospheric carbon dioxide, in the U.S. territory of the United States Virgin Islands. The United States Environmental Protection Agency (EPA) has noted a variety of expected consequences of this phenomenon.

== See also ==
- Effects of climate change on island nations
- Impact of hurricanes on Caribbean history
- Hurricane Irma
- Caribbean Sea
