= Humboldt Current =

Current of the Pacific Ocean

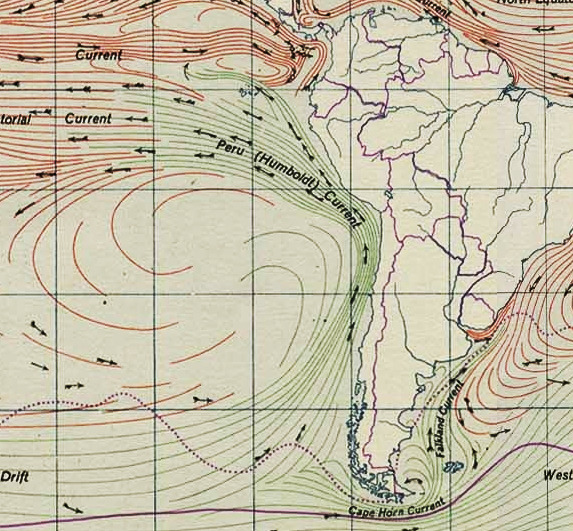
Humboldt Current

The Humboldt Current, also called the Peru Current, is a cold, low-salinity ocean current that flows north along the western coast of South America. It is an eastern boundary current flowing in the direction of the equator, and extends 500–1,000 km (310–620 mi) offshore. The Humboldt Current is named after the German naturalist Alexander von Humboldt even though it was discovered by José de Acosta 250 years before Humboldt. In 1846, von Humboldt reported measurements of the cold-water current in his book Cosmos.

The current extends from southern Chile (~45th parallel south) to northern Peru (~4th parallel south) where cold, upwelled, waters intersect warm tropical waters to form the Equatorial Front. Sea surface temperatures off the coast of Peru, around 5th parallel south, reach temperatures as low as 16 °C (61 °F). This is highly uncharacteristic of tropical waters, as most other regions have temperatures measuring above 25 °C (77 °F). Upwelling brings nutrients to the surface, which support phytoplankton and ultimately increase biological productivity.

The Humboldt Current is a highly productive ecosystem. It is the most productive eastern boundary current system. It accounts for roughly 18-20% of the total worldwide marine fish catch. The species are mostly pelagic: sardines, anchovies and jack mackerel. The system's high productivity supports other important fishery resources as well as marine mammals (eared seals and cetaceans) and seabirds. Periodically, the upwelling that drives the system's productivity is disrupted by the El Niño-Southern Oscillation (ENSO) event, often with large social and economic impacts.

The Humboldt has a considerable cooling influence on the climate of Chile, Peru and Ecuador. It is also largely responsible for the aridity of the Atacama Desert in northern Chile and coastal areas of Peru and also of the aridity of southern Ecuador. Marine air is cooled by the current and thus is not conducive to generating precipitation (although clouds and fog are produced).

== Physical oceanography ==
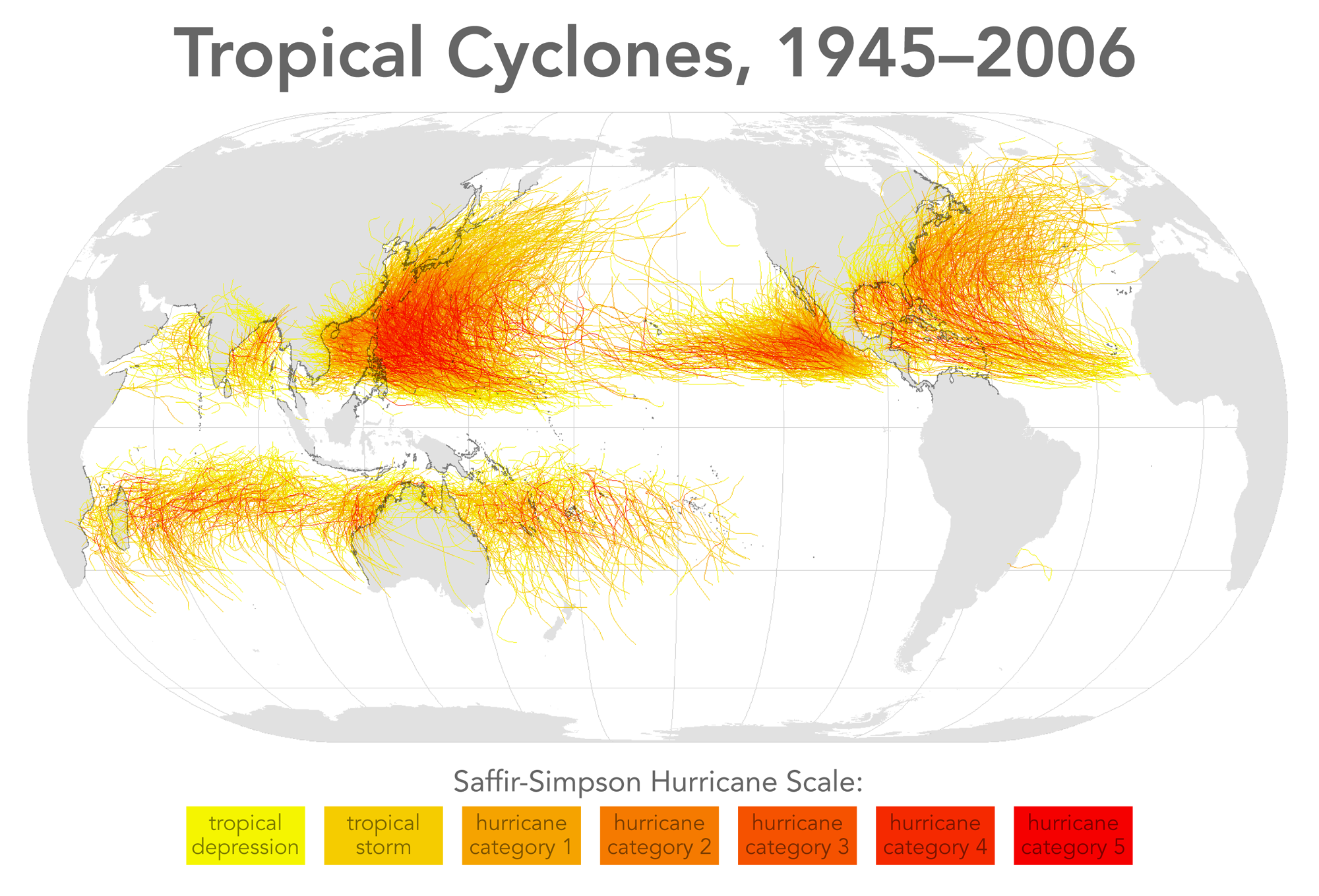
The presence of the Humboldt Current and its associated wind shear makes for conditions that inhibit the formation of tropical cyclones. (Worldwide tropical cyclone tracks, 1945–2006.)

The trade winds are the primary drivers of the Humboldt Current circulation. Variability in this system is driven by latitudinal shifts between the Intertropical Convergent Zone and the trade winds in the north. Shifts within the South Pacific High at mid-latitudes, as well as cyclonic storms and movement of the Southern Westerlies southward also contribute to system changes. Atmospheric variability off central Chile is enhanced by the aggravation of coastal low pressure systems trapped between the marine boundary layer and the coastal mountains. This is prominent poleward from 27th parallel south to 42nd parallel south.

The Humboldt current, occupying the upper ocean, flows equatorward carrying fresh, cold Sub-Antarctic surface water northward, along the outskirts of the subtropical gyre. The main flow of the current veers offshore in southern Peru, as a weaker limb continues to flow equatorward. Around 18th parallel south the fresh, cold waters begin to mix with the warm, high salinity Subtropical Surface waters. This collision causes partial subductions. Within this region, the equatorial undercurrent (EUC) flows eastward along the equator, feeding the Peru-Chile undercurrent (PCU) that moves poleward.

Off the coast of central Chile, there is a coastal transition zone (CTZ), which is characterized by high eddy kinetic energy. This energy forms mesoscale eddies which extend 600–800 km (370–500 mi) offshore. The CTZ has three distinct regions within its boundaries:

1. high chlorophyll-a concentrations in wide regions off the coast of Peru (10–15°S),
2. high chlorophyll-a concentrations in wide regions off the coast of Chile (30°S), and
3. high chlorophyll-a concentrations in narrow regions off the coast of northern Chile (Montecino and Lange 2008). High chlorophyll-a concentrations are generally found within 50 km of the coast.

The limb of the Humboldt Current System that veers off the coast of Peru creates a decrease in ventilation within the system. This lack of ventilation is the primary driver of an intense oxygen minimum zone (OMZ) which is formed in the sub-surface to intermediate depths. In the north, the EUC ventilates the OMZ, and in the south the PCU advects low oxygen waters southward towards northern Chile. This OMZ is the fourth largest permanent hypoxic zone in the world's oceans. It occupies an area about 2.18 ± 0.66 million km^{3}. The core of this zone is centered off Peru, creating a shallow upper boundary that reaches from about 100 m (330 ft) down to 600 m (2,000 ft). Another factor contributing to the OMZ is sinking and decay of primary productive resources.

Consequently, the OMZ forces many organisms to stay near the surface where nutrients and oxygen are obtainable. The presence of a shallow OMZ restricts the migration of zooplankton within the water column. Between 0 and 600 m (0–1,969 ft), many species of zooplankton occupy this space within the OMZ. This allows for a substantial exchange of carbon between the euphotic layer and the OMZ. 75% of the total zooplankton biomass move in and out of the OMZ. The OMZ also serves as a refuge for organisms that can live in hypoxic conditions.

Coastal upwelling is the main factor contributing to the high biological productivity of the Humboldt current. Upwelling within the current is not uniform across the entire system. Three notable upwelling subsystems are produced by this current:

1. seasonal upwelling in Chile only during the spring and summer, because of the displacement of the subtropical center of high pressure during the period January–March,
2. upwelling "shadow" that is less productive, but still large in northern Chile and Southern Peru, and
3. highly productive year-round upwelling in Peru. The upwelling shadow identified between 35°S and 15°S is caused by the oligotrophic subtropical gyre impinging on the coast. This creates a narrow, but highly productive, upwelling zone.

== Biological productivity ==
Due to the upwelling zones within the Humboldt current, biological diversity is extremely high. The Humboldt Current is considered a Class I, highly productive (>300 gC/m^{2}/yr) ecosystem. The current hosts a wide range of organisms including multiple species of plankton, mollusks, sea urchins, crustaceans, fish, and marine mammals. The food web starts with the phytoplankton. The conditions of the Humboldt current are prime for these organisms to thrive. This causes a cascade effect in which larger and larger organisms are drawn to the area.

== Fisheries ==
The Humboldt current produces some of the most successful commercial fisheries in the world. The major catches include: sardines, anchovies, mackerel, hake, and squid. Three major stocks of anchoveta are distributed between 4°S and 42°S within the Humboldt Current System. North-central Peru's fishery is primarily composed of one stock of anchoveta. Sardines, chub mackerel, and bonito are also common catches, but not as prominent, in Peru. Southern Peru and Northern Chile host a major sardine fishery. Other common stocks include: a second anchoveta stock, jack mackerel, tuna, and swordfish. Anchoveta, jack mackerel, and sardines are the primary commercial stocks in central Chile.

Anchoveta are found in more recently upwelled waters, close to the coast. Sardines, on the other hand, are typically found farther offshore. Seasonal upwelling plays a major role in the spawning behaviors of both sardines and anchoveta. By spawning at the end of winter, egg and larval survival is greatly enhanced. This is due to the moderate upwelling, which causes lower turbulence, as well as a weakened Ekman drift offshore. These two species experience population shifts related to climate changes and environmental events such as El Niño. This is due to changes in the availability of each species habitat. Anchoveta are an important component in the diets of marine mammals, seabirds, and larger fish. Shifts in these populations ultimately cause a shift in the energy processing within the Humboldt Current System.

Jack mackerel (jurel) is the second largest fishery in the Humboldt Current System. As with the anchoveta in Peru, this species is believed to be composed of a single stock. Jurel are a straddling species. This means the species is found both within and outside of the 200-mile economic exclusive zone. Jurel became an important fishery in the 1970s to alleviate the pressure put on the anchoveta stock. During the 1980s, however, the jurel decreased in population size due to poor recruitment and overfishing. Restrictions of jurel fishing were imposed in 1998 which led to regrowth of the population. Since 2002, the jurel population is now under full exploitation.

Between 1993 and 2008, the hake fishery in Peru declined significantly. This was due to overfishing, environmental stress, and decreased reproductive capacity. The Chilean hake population in central-south Chile catch exceeded 100,000 tons, and dropped to 40,000 tons in 2007.

== Influence of El Niño ==
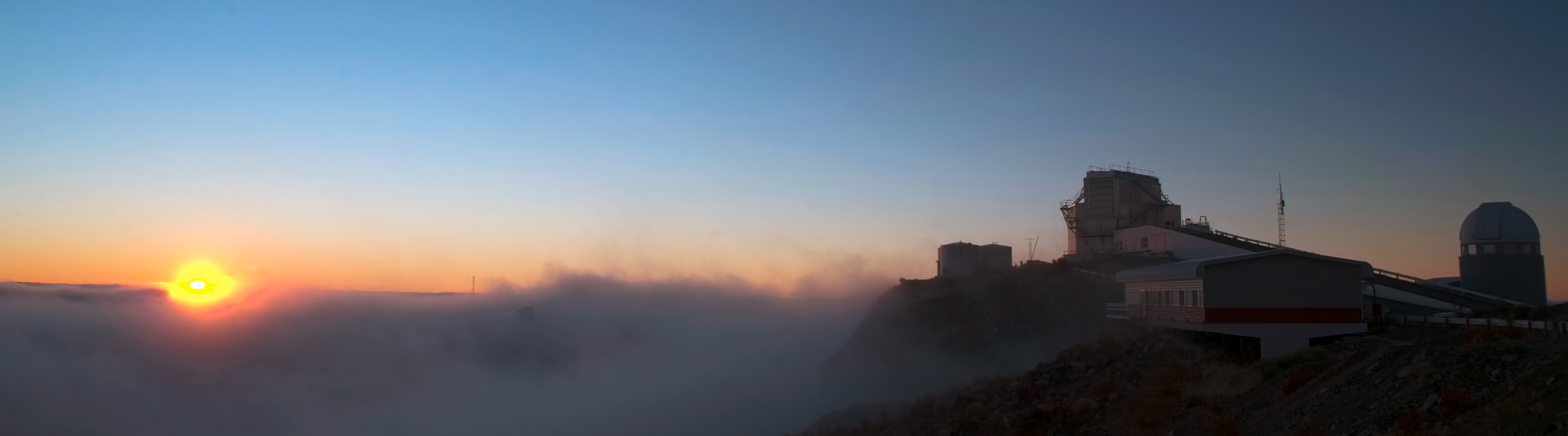
La Silla observatory is in the Southern outskirts of the Atacama Desert, one of the driest places on Earth, it may come as a surprise to see cloud formations result of the Humboldt Current.

The productivity of the Humboldt Current System is strongly affected by El Niño and La Niña events. During an El Niño event, the thermocline and upper region of the OMZ deepen to greater than 600 m. This causes a loss of nitrogen and decrease in export of carbon. El Niño also causes poleward currents to increase in velocity. During non-El Niño years, productivity is very high due to the high nutrient contents, nitrogen recycling through processes such as denitrification, increased carbon export, and remineralization.

During El Niño events, fish abundance and distribution are significantly affected, often leading to stock crashes and cascading social and economic impacts. These events have led to sequential changes, where sardines and anchovies have replaced each other periodically as the dominant species in the ecosystem. These species changes can have negative consequences for the fishing industry and the economies of the countries that fish the system. The anchoveta fishery in Peru was booming during the 1960s. In 1970, catches were reported to exceed 12 million tons per year. This accounted for 20% of the world's catches. An El Niño event occurred during 1972 and caused the anchoveta population to collapse. However, sardine populations saw a dramatic increase in the next 15–20 years. Consequently, sardine fisheries grew in this "regime shift".

== See also ==
- Gulf Stream
- Humboldt squid
- Ocean current
- Oceanic gyres
- Physical oceanography
- South Pacific Gyre
- Thermohaline circulation
- Walker circulation
