= Impact of hurricanes on Caribbean history =

Impact of hurricanes on the Caribbean throughout history

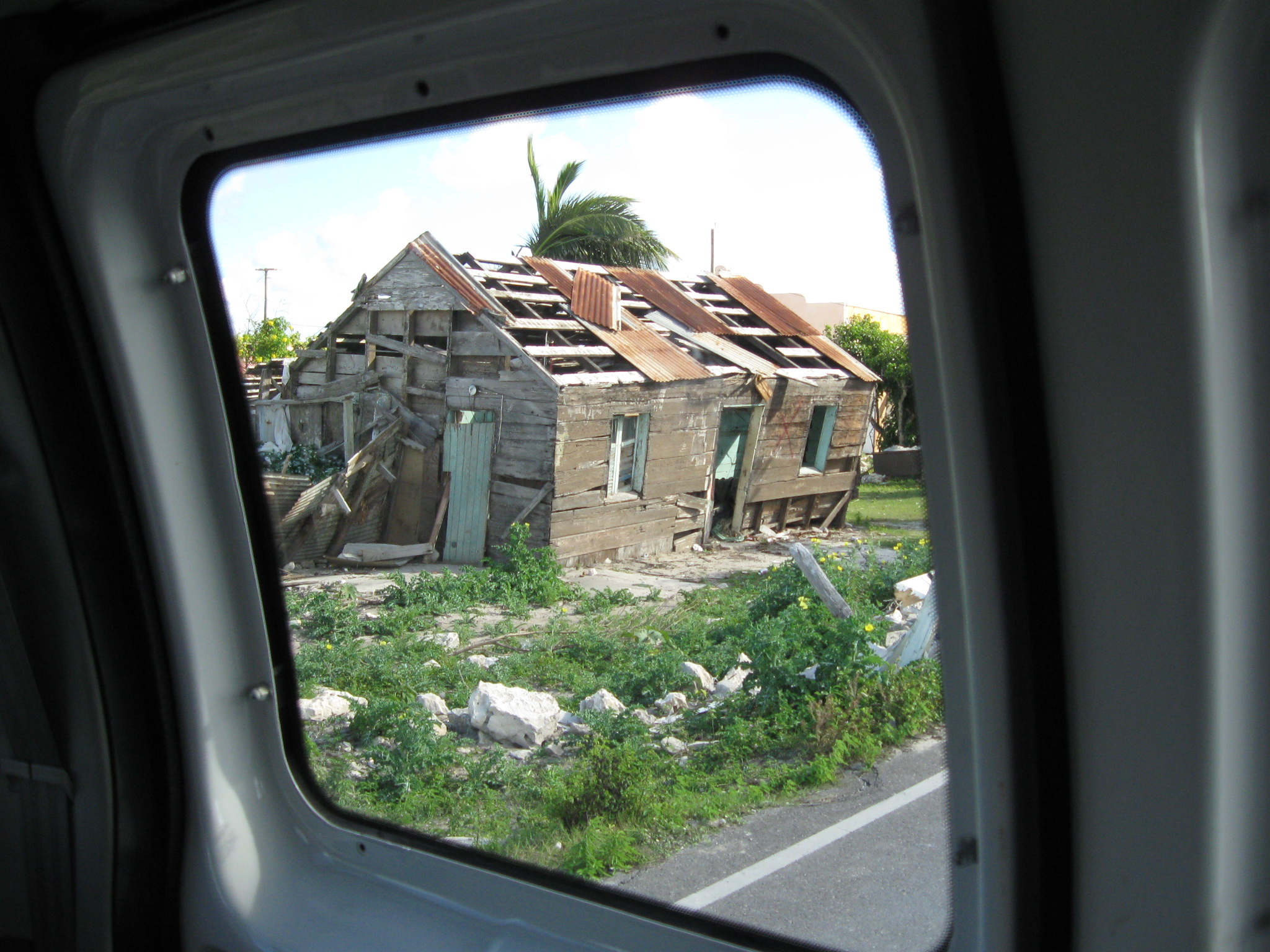
Caribbean Winter

Caribbean hurricanes are one of the most frequent natural disasters that impact the Caribbean. A hurricane is a tropical cyclone with sustained one-minute winds of at least 74 miles per hour. They are created when warm water hits the troposphere and high pressure pushes warm, dry air down in the center. This occurrence is particularly strong in the Caribbean due to the high amounts of humidity and warm air produce near perfect conditions to form these hurricanes, which are measured by the Saffir-Simpson scale and the Power Dispersion Index (PDI). When this extreme amount of energy encounters a society, the effects are of great magnitude.

Because of these favorable conditions, there have been many hurricanes that have passed through and affected the Caribbean waters. Most notably The Great Hurricane of 1780, San Ciriaco in 1899, Hurricane Gilbert in 1988, the hurricane season of 2008, Hurricane Sandy in 2012, Hurricane Joaquin in 2015, and most recently, Hurricane Irma in late 2017. The Atlantic Hurricane Season runs from June to November 30 and peaks from August to October. The people of the Caribbean view hurricanes as a natural part of life. When a hurricane touches down on a Caribbean island the damage is substantial; the ecology is thrown out of its normal cycle, topography shifts, agriculture is set back, the economy and industry take a blow, society either unites or falls apart, infrastructure is ruined, and preventative measures must be implemented. There is no part of Caribbean life or its history that is untouched by natural disasters. As far back as Columbus, hurricane activity was recorded as he sailed across the Atlantic. This extensive record of impacts influences Caribbean life and the people living in the Caribbean nations.

== Ecology ==
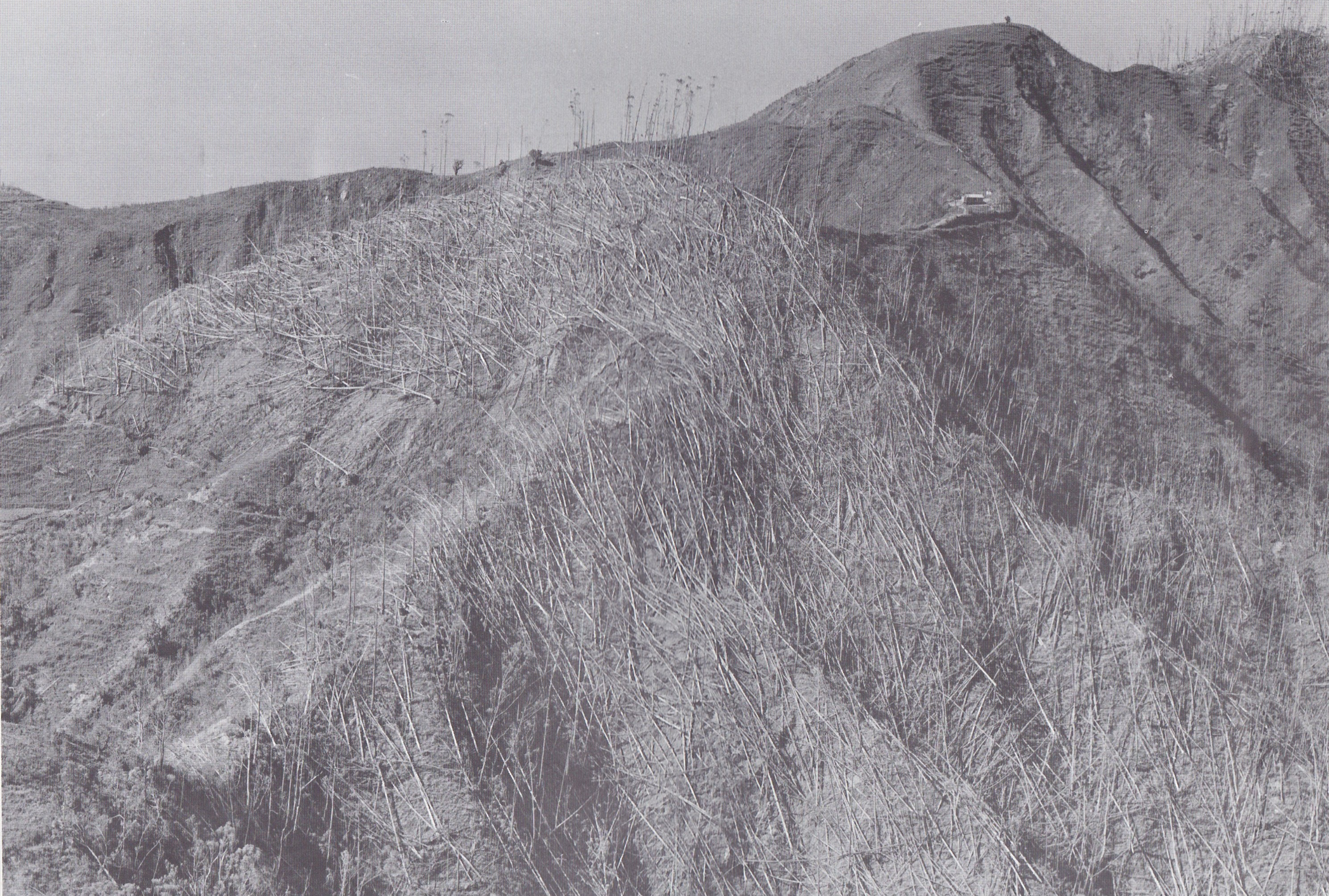
Caribbean pine forest in the Blue Mountains, Jamaica

The ecology of the Caribbean is tropical because of its proximity to the equator with warm temperatures that result in a humid climate. There are many ecosystems in the Caribbean with a multitude of tropical plants, trees and animals. When a hurricane passes over an island, it brings usually heavy rainfall and strong winds. These heavy rains saturate the soil and make it weaker, while the tree canopies became heavier than normal. The strong winds bring debris and break down the trees, which contributes to the amount of debris that would be carried by flooded rivers. The drier the hurricane, the less impact it would cause because soil is not as saturated.

The effects of the hurricane on vegetation structure and trees are notable effects of Caribbean hurricanes. The damage of the Jamaican Cockpit Country revealed that the least damage was in the bottom of valleys protected by forests and the most damage was on slopes with no other vegetation for protection. The defoliation of the canopy can be a positive effect because the winds blow the leaves to the forest floor and deliver nutrient pulses to much needed plants. The susceptibility of plants to storms depends on the age, density, and proximity to larger plants.

Animals are also affected by their physical death, changes in food supply and changes in the microenvironment, the degree of survival differing with each affected category. For example, the physical numbers of bird populations were largely reduced by Hurricane Gilbert, but recovered quickly, while the populations that lived in forests with foliage damage took longer to recover. The effects of hurricanes on animals and their environment is significant, but the extent is unknown because of the multiple plant species and soil quality that influence the research of the ecology after a Hurricane.

== Topography ==
The natives of the Caribbean suggested that hurricanes were a natural part of the cycle of life, so they adjusted for survival. The Taínos, natives of the Greater Antilles, built their lives around the seasonality, frequency and power of storms. In the 1700s, authorities began to prohibit building along the coast because they wanted to lessen illegal activity and foreign contact, but it would also help to lessen the casualties of a hurricane's storm surge. The citizens whose jobs involved the sea would have to obtain licenses before they could sail. Inland, flooding did the greatest damage. Cuba's dense forests had to be cut down in the 1790s to make room for the growing population, even though the trees were preventing soil erosion in that area. The increase in population and danger of soil erosion made the rains of future hurricanes disastrous.

== Agriculture and economy ==
The agriculture of the Caribbean is critical to the islands because the income from the import and export of crops largely contributes to their economy. If crops are destroyed from the effects of hurricanes, the islands will need to rebuild their system as fast as possible to generate income needed to rebuild infrastructure. The factor that determines the success of crops is the weather. The initial effect of the hurricane on crops is staggering. The 1860s was a particularly bad decade for Puerto Rico. 1865 and 1866 had been a tough year for crops, particularly sugar and coffee, so there were high expectancies for the 1867 season. Luck was not on their side; there was heavy downpours in the beginning of the year that saturated the soil and rivers. The fields could not take any more water and this resulted in the loss of 10 million escudos in damage for crops like coffee, rum, sugar, cotton and tobacco. This impeded the rebuilding process and eventually added to the political tensions of the time.

The 1899 San Ciriaco hurricane hit Puerto Rico, whose economy relied primarily on coffee. The crop had already been facing problems with a decrease in prices and competing countries, but the hurricane wiped out any chance of rebounding from the losses of the previous years. The winds stripped the berries from the trees and the coffee exports of 1899 were only 10 percent of the average export. The losses amounted to 12 million dollars in revenue from 1899 to 1901. This left a dismal outlook on the future for farmers. Sugar was also affected by the storm, although the results were not as drastic. Only a third of the sugar crop could be harvested in 1899, but the soil was reinvigorated. The storm only affected the older haciendas, which would have been retired soon regardless of the hurricane. This allowed for newer technologies to be introduced to the sugar system and U.S. involvement increased. Overall, San Ciriaco helped and hurt the agriculture of Puerto Rico.

The economy of the Caribbean is dependent on the productivity of its agricultural sector. The infrastructure of a community is usually destroyed with the subsistence crops and crops for export. One example is the three simultaneous hurricanes that hit Cuba in the 1840s. These hurricanes destroyed coffee crops, which made Cuban planters abandon coffee and turn to sugar production. The Cuban economy, specifically the transatlantic economy, relied on routes and patterns of travel in the Atlantic for trading. In Cuba in the early 1800s, coffee exports competed with the emerging sugar interests. Following the Haitian Revolution, Spain was interested in utilizing another colony to center its sugar production. Cuba became that colony and the foremost producer of sugar for the modern world. The empirical rule of the Spanish over the Cubans, especially Cuban slaves, was dominant and demonstrated the increasing debasement of slaves for monetary gains. Agriculture was an important part of the Cuban economy, and it was especially vulnerable to the hurricanes that hit the Cuban island. In the 1830s, Cuba was hit by several hurricanes, including Cienfuegos in 1832, and a hurricane that devastated Havana, Matanzas, and Trinidad.

Cuba in the 1840s encountered many changes agriculturally, economically, and socially. Beginning early in the decade, through the expansion of sugar production, the institution of slavery also expanded. Slavery expanded due to the increasing demands for the production of sugar. At this point in Cuban history, the international markets were also expanding. The demand for sugar increased exponentially. Economically, while the market demanded sugar from Cuba, coffee, tobacco, and sugar continued to be grown on the island. Land, in order to cultivate these commodities, as well as a large slave population, was necessary to sustain production levels. During this decade of agricultural growth, the hurricanes that occurred in this region did not necessarily hinder the overall boom of production in the Spanish Caribbean, especially Cuba. The hurricanes has immediate impact on the island's people and ability to thrive.

While hurricanes might not have impacted the overall domination of agricultural production in the Caribbean, individual storms in the 1840s affected infrastructure and the fields for subsistence farmers and larger growers. On October 4, 1844, Hurricane San Francisco de Asis struck the island of Cuba. The storm swept through ports and towns, especially near Havana. Ships, docks, and piers near these ports were destroyed in these storms. Areas inland were also affected, including many rich agricultural zones. These storms damaged the fields and changed the geological makeup of them. Although these storms might have not affected the economy in the long term, they were significant in the immediate impact that they had. Homes were destroyed and fields were rendered useless until they regained their usable state. Before the affected areas of the island could fully recover from the damage of Hurricane San Francisco de Asis, in October 1846 Hurricane San Francisco de Borja hit half of western Cuba. All crops suffered from this hurricane and the overall harvest during the year was reduced by ¾.

Another thought to consider is that increasing damage estimates in recent years, which will only expand because of the growing population. Certain economies are believed to have their foundation created during historical events. For instance, Acemoglu et el. believes the disease environment determined if colonial powers decided to invest in institutions to protect property rights and thus played an important role in the investment of quality institutions and economic development since their independence. Trade is crucial to island countries, particularly because their economy has grown reliant on its exports to other countries. The sugar industry was the Caribbean's main source of income during colonial times. Even though there is only a one-year reduction in sugar exports, it amounted to an average of 68.1% throughout the entire Caribbean. The reduction in exports comes out to one-fourth of its value. Any loss in revenue hurts the overall economy because most these populations live in poverty and rely on crops to put food on the table.

== Society ==
The impact of hurricanes on society is visible through the loss of life, increase in social tensions and damage to infrastructures. The three different arguments related to cause of hurricanes are human caused, scientifically caused and divinely caused. The last argument is a widely held belief by the indigenous population. Natives believed that disasters were the will of their gods and nothing could be done from preventing the oncoming hurricane. Beliefs of what caused disasters began to change to a more scientific thought during the Enlightenment period. There was an increase in funding for scientific research and regulations would be created to ensure safety. Caribbean ports were closed during the fall equinox and no ship could leave until the “dangerous season passed”.

In The Great Hurricane of 1780, 20,000 perished and in 1998 Hurricane Mitch tallied from 11,000-19,000 dead. Furthermore, hurricanes would destroy most of the available food sources, plantains or guanabanas that fell from trees would be the only available food course, but even these would begin to rot within a few days. Hunger would arrive and the people affected would have to seek out other sources of nutrients that they wouldn't normally eat, like grated roots of plants. Various types of sicknesses would follow. For example, Steven Schwartz writes that after the 1685 hurricane in Puerto Rico about 900 people died from a deadly plague because their immune systems were weakened from hunger. The bodies that were found in rivers ended up contaminating potable water sources and led to the spread of diseases.

The rise in social tensions were revealed in the aftermath of the hurricane. The fear of looting and a breakdown of authority by a slave revolt would plague the minds of slave owners, although slaves were affected the most because of their lack of access to proper resources. One exception to the slave owners’ fear was the hurricane in 1776 led to a slave rebellion, where 25,000 slaves from 70 different plantations were killing their overseers and burning buildings and cane fields. Normally, like in San Ciriaco, no “extensive looting or other civil disturbances” were recorded.

Thirdly, the damage of society's infrastructure by hurricanes is massive. The Hurricane of 1780 had a storm surge of up to 25 feet that destroyed 150 homes and collapsed the hospital, where wounded sailors were being treated. In 1792, a hurricane hit Cuba and brought less rain than the 1791 hurricane, but the 1792 hurricane had higher wind speeds and halted or destroyed the rebuilding from the road and bridges damaged in 1791. Despite the 1792 hurricane being a moderate disaster, the effects coupled with bad weather earlier in the year compounded the destruction. The communication lines within society had broken down and trees blocked roads that were used to send supplies to neighboring towns. The destruction of the infrastructure of Ponce, the second largest city, by San Ciriaco flooded the streets, ruined the closed businesses along the coast, damaged municipal buildings, and destroyed telephone, telegraph and electric services. These storms stripped away human built safety barriers and forced people to live in poverty.

== Preventative measures ==
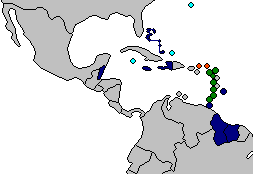
Members of CARICOM

Since hurricanes are commonplace in the Caribbean, countries have begun the process of disaster mitigation. For example, the British Housing Project in St. Vincent built new houses with foundations supported by concrete walls and wood beams cast in concrete. There have also been the development of wind seed maps that give insight on the correct angle to position roofs and a stricterinspection of building codes throughout the Caribbean. Most residential houses and structures are susceptible to hurricane damage in CARICOM, the Caribbean Community and Common Market. Historically, agricultural workers in St. Kitts didn't own their houses and most of these homes were built as small and cheaply as possible. Construction of houses also occurred on poor soil conditions and steep slopes that increased the vulnerability to landslides and soil erosion. Because of the poor construction and inadequate living areas, there have been numerous efforts to reduce hurricane damage.

The leading groups of disaster mitigation include: the Caribbean Disaster Mitigation Project 2011 (CDMP), the Caribbean Disaster Emergency Management Agency (CDEMA) by CARICOM, and the University of West Indies Cyclone Resistant Housing (Caribbean) Project. The development of technology has aided in disaster prevention too. Some examples are the introduction of kites and balloons to measure the insides of storms, weather reconnaissance (flying aircraft into a hurricane) and hurricane forecasting to track the path of storms. These systems have become even more important because of the rise of population during the last inactive period from the 1970s to 1990s. Hurricane Mitch is a harbinger of future disaster for the Caribbean, unless societal vulnerabilities are reduced.

== See also ==
- Climate change in the Caribbean
- Environmental history
