= 2022 Southern Cone heat wave =

Weather event in South America

Meteorological history
- Duration: 10 January 2022 - 26 January 2022
- Heat wave

Overall effects
- Fatalities: 3
- Areas affected: Argentina; Brazil; Paraguay; Uruguay

In mid-January 2022, the Southern Cone had a severe heat wave, which made the region for a while the hottest place on earth, with temperatures exceeding those of the Middle East. This extreme weather event was associated with the Atlantic anticyclone, a particularly intense La Niña phenomenon in the Pacific Ocean, and the regional effects of climate change.

Several cities had high temperatures over 40 °C (104 °F), setting records for hot days. In addition, thousands of hectares were destroyed by wildfires across the region.

== By country ==
=== Argentina ===
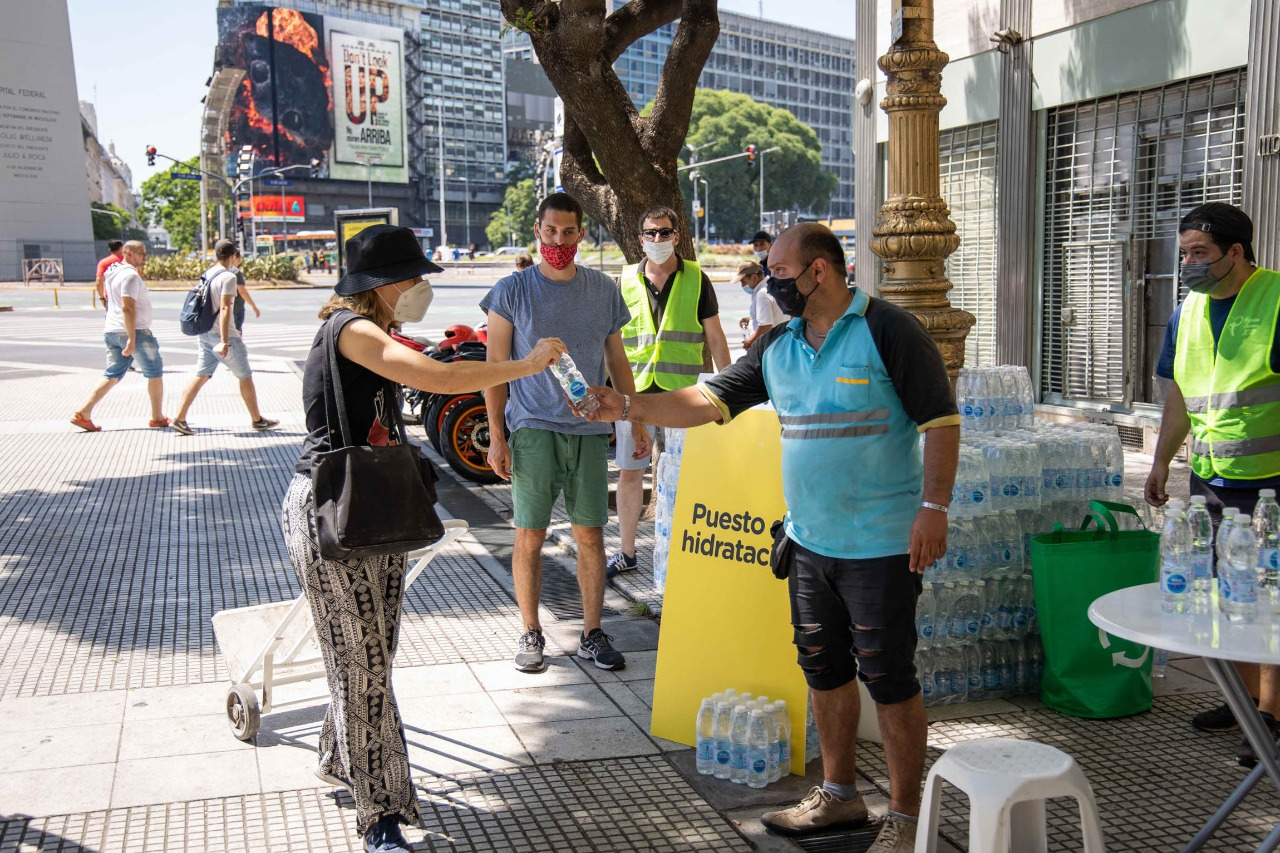
Hydration station in Buenos Aires.

On January 10, the temperatures were "particularly anomalous" in the south of the Pampas region and the north of Patagonia. According to the Servicio Meteorológico Nacional (SMN), that day maximum temperature records were broken in Tres Arroyos 40.7 °C (105.3 °F) and Coronel Pringles 39.6 °C (103.3 °F), along with other records that ranged between 40 °C (104 °F) and 43 °C (109 °F) in the region. However, a few days later those same marks were surpassed, with 41.8 °C (107.2 °F) in Tres Arroyos and 40.1 °C (104.2 °F) in Coronel Pringles.

On January 11, Buenos Aires reached 41.1 °C (106.0 °F), which was the second maximum temperature at the moment since there are systematic records. That day almost 45.0 °C (113.0 °F) were registered in San Juan, a few tenths of the monthly record for January. On January 12 the city saw 3 heat-related deaths. On January 14, Buenos Aires reached 41.5 °C (106.7 °F), which became the second highest temperature recorded, surpassing that recorded three days earlier.

During the wave, new electric energy consumption records were set at the national level, above 28,000 MW. On January 11, a massive blackout affected 700,000 users in the north of Buenos Aires and Greater Buenos Aires. To avoid blackouts, the Argentine government asked the industrial sector to reduce energy demand between January 13 and 14, with the aim of being able to provide energy to the home network. In addition, it decreed teleworking for two days for public employees and urged provincial governments to take similar measures. During the most intense week of the heat wave, Argentina imported energy from Brazil and Uruguay.

In the midst of the heat wave, and after important fires registered in the previous weeks, especially in Patagonia, the national government declared a fire emergency throughout the country for one year. Fires were recorded in the grasslands and wooded area near Canning and Tristán Suárez, in Ezeiza, which affected some 130 hectares. In Corrientes, a series of wildfires took place, which consumed around 800,000 hectares, which is equivalent to approximately ten percent of the province.

=== Brazil ===
In Brazil, the state most severely affected by the heat wave was Rio Grande do Sul, where the heat wave covered nearly the entire state for several days. The western regions of Paraná and Santa Catarina were also affected. According to Brazil's National Institute of Meteorology (Inmet), the heat peak was expected on January 23, before a cold front advances across the region. By that point, Rio Grande do Sul had experienced 11 consecutive days with temperatures reaching and exceeding 40°C (104°F). 262 out of 497 municipalities of Rio Grande do Sul declared a state of emergency because of the heat, and many had power outages and water supply issues.

The heat also became a serious problem because of livestock deaths caused by the extreme temperatures, as well as wildfires and crop losses. The drought and extreme heat are estimated to have caused approximately R$43 billion in agricultural losses.

=== Uruguay ===
Initially, the Uruguayan Institute of Meteorology (INUMET) issued an alert for the heat wave in the north, center and west of the country, but on January 13 it was extended to the entire country. That day, the maximum temperature of 42.5 °C (108.5 °F) was reached in the northern city of Salto, being the hottest January day since 1961. On January 14, Florida reached 44 °C (111 °F), the highest temperature ever recorded in the country, matching a 1943 record. 14 of the 19 departments of the country reached a temperature above 40 °C (104 °F) during the wave.

The heat wave affected the generation of wind power due to the lack of wind, which resulted in 50% of the electrical energy having to be generated with the thermal power stations of the National Administration of Power Plants and Electrical Transmissions (UTE). On January 14, a blackout affected around 25,000 electricity network users in the Canelones, Montevideo and Treinta y Tres departments. On that day the country's energy consumption record was broken, reaching 2,139 MW.

After four days of heat wave, the National Directorate of Firefighters reported more than 100 active fires in different parts of the country, such as Paysandú and Rio Negro. This weather event intensified the drought, which had triggered a declaration of "agricultural emergency" in December 2021. In addition, it caused the death of 400,000 chickens, for an estimated value of 1.5 million dollars, due to this, the Ministry of Livestock, Agriculture and Fisheries declared the "poultry emergency".

== See also ==
- 2022 heat waves
- Climate change in the Americas
- List of weather records
- 2021 Argentine Patagonia wildfires
- 2023 Chile wildfires
