= Climate of Ecuador =

Ecuador map of Köppen climate classification.

Ecuador’s climate is complex and shaped by interacting factors such as its equatorial location, atmospheric and oceanic circulation patterns, and significant topographic barriers within a relatively small geographic area. The country is divided into four natural regions: the Coastal Region (La Costa), the Amazon Region (Oriente/Eastern), the Andean Highlands (Sierra), and the Galápagos Islands (Insular Region).

Across all four regions, average temperatures remain relatively stable due to Ecuador’s equatorial location. In contrast, precipitation varies widely from heavy seasonal shifts on the coast and highlands to persistent rainfall in the Amazon. Climate modes associated with the nearby Pacific and Atlantic oceans, including the El Niño-Southern Oscillation (ENSO), cause additional effects on Ecuador’s climate. These interactions can produce extreme weather causing periods of intense rainfall, drought, flooding, and landslides.

The climate is changing as human activities increase greenhouse gas concentrations in the atmosphere. This change can be seen through temperature increases, shifting rainfall patterns, retreating glaciers, and changing ecosystems, all of which contribute to increasing water scarcity and environmental vulnerability in coastal and eastern regions.

== Effects of climate change ==
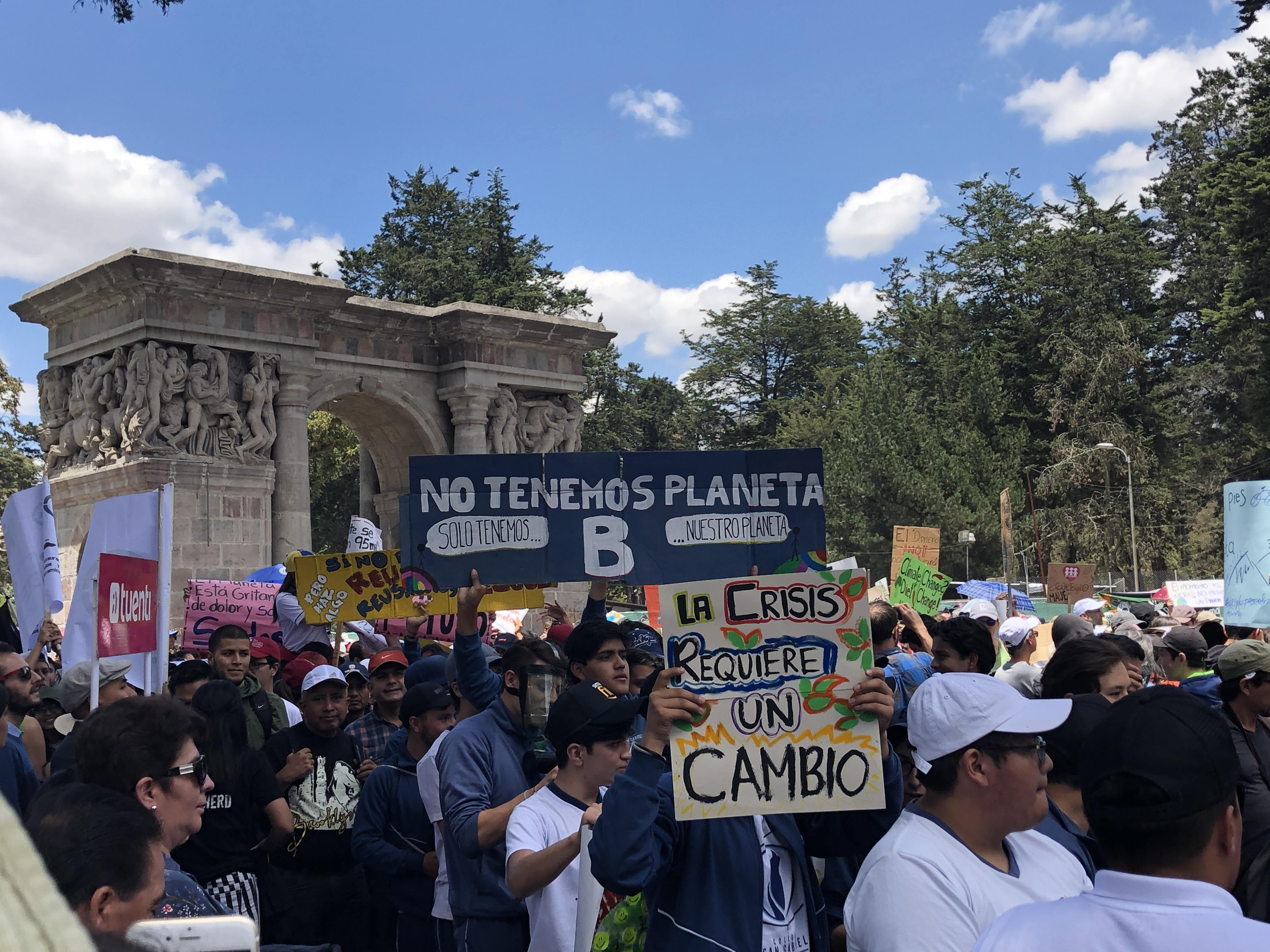
Protesters in Quito during the September 2019 climate strikes.

Ecuador has a diverse geography and is very vulnerable to climate change. Antisana, Cotopaxi, Chimborazo, Cayambe, the Ilinizas (north and south), El Altar, and Carihuairazo are the seven glaciers of Ecuador. These glaciers are all located on volcanic craters that are affected by the greenhouse effect. Because of global warming glacier Carihuairazo has already lost 96% of its glacier surface. With the continued worsening of climate change, Carihuairazo can disappear within five years. By the end of 2018, there was an average nationwide loss of 53% of glacier coverage. Glacier shrinkage is a natural phenomenon that has existed; however, in the last 20 years climate change has exacerbated shrinkage. These glaciers in Ecuador play a major role in the climate because they gather the atmospheric circulation from the Pacific and the humidity of the Amazon region.

== Regional overview ==
=== Coastal region (La Costa) ===
The coastal region of Ecuador, known as La Costa, has a climate influenced by the Pacific Ocean and seasonal shifts in ocean currents. Its rainy season lasts from January to April, with high relative humidity (79% in February) and heavy precipitation (12.11 mm/day in February). During the region's dry season, which runs from June to December, there is less precipitation, with November having the fewest rain days of the year.

For a tropical zone, La Costa has relatively few direct sunshine hours (unobstructed sunlight) because humidity and cloud coverage are heavily influenced by the cold Humboldt Current and the warm Panama Current. The Humboldt Current lowers evaporation and produces cooler, overcast conditions, while the Panama Current increases moisture and rainfall from December to May.

=== Amazon region (oriente/eastern region) ===
The Amazon Region, or Oriente, has a humid tropical rainforest climate, facing extremely high rainfall and minimal seasonal variation. Because this region sits fully within the equatorial rainforest belt, it maintains consistently warm conditions throughout the year. There is rainfall every month, meaning there is no official dry season. Frequent cloud coverage limits direct sunshine hours compared with the rest of Ecuador.

As part of the Amazon Basin, the Oriente is one of the world’s largest rainforest ecosystems; dense vegetation, continuous evapotranspiration, and strong moisture transport keep humidity levels approximately the same all year round. Another big influence of this region is the Andean foothills, which generate rainfall through an upslope flow as moist Amazonian air rises toward the mountains. Temperatures remain around 21 °C, keeping the environment uniformly warm and wet, and supporting evergreen forest biodiversity and the Amazon’s expansive river networks.

=== Andes Highlands (Sierra/Andes Mountains) ===
The Andean Highlands, or Sierra, span the central belt of the Andes Mountains and have a temperate, elevation-driven climate. As the coldest region in Ecuador, it experiences distinct wet and dry seasons, with rainfall peaking during January to March, and much drier periods from June to September. Persistent cloud coverage is prominent; even the sunniest month of April only has 3.6 hours of unobstructed sunlight due to constant cloud layers,

High elevation induces strong microclimatic variance that ranges from cool, high-altitude páramo environments to warmer inter-Andean valleys. Orographic lifting, when moist air is pushed upward against the mountains, contributes to consistent cloud formation and localized rainfall. This combination of elevation, terrain, and seasonal precipitation creates a much cooler and cloudier climate for the Andean Highlands.

=== Galapagos Islands (insular region) ===
The Galápagos Islands have a warm, humid climate strongly controlled by shifting Pacific Ocean currents. Although warm year-round by global standards, the islands are cooled seasonally by the Humboldt Current. Sunshine hours vary widely, with the sunniest periods in May and the middle months, and fewer hours in the later months. Rain day also cluster toward the beginning of the year, with February having most rain days while October has the fewest.

The Galápagos Islands’ climate patterns are shaped by the interaction between the Humboldt Current, the Panama Current, and the Equatorial Countercurrent, which differentiate a warmer, wetter season from a cooler, drier one. Since these ocean currents drive conditions, microclimates vary across the islands, from hot lowland coasts to cooler highland areas. These localized weather patterns contribute to the Galápagos Islands’ ecological diversity.

== Temperature and precipitation ==
=== Temperature ===
Due to Ecuador’s location near the equator, temperatures remain relatively constant throughout the year, with daytime temperatures typically between 26–28 °C (79–82 °F), and nighttime temperatures typically between 18–20 °C (64–68 °F). Temperatures are slightly higher during the rainy season, which runs from November through May. The Coastal Region, located west of the Andes, has higher temperatures (30.6 °C [87.1 °F] during the day and 21.9 °C [71.4 °F] at night), than regions east of the Andes, such as the Amazon Region (Oriente/East) (26.7 °C [80.1 °F] during the day and 17.7 °C [63.9 °F] at night) and the Andean Highlands (Sierra/Andes Mountains) (25.5 °C [77.9 °F] during the day and 17 °C [63 °F] at night) regions. Temperatures in the Galápagos Islands (Insular Region) are also similar, from 28.5 °C (83.3 °F) during the day to 21.9 °C (71.4 °F) at night. However, these temperatures still remain relatively constant throughout the year.

=== Precipitation ===
Ecuador has two main seasons, the rainy season from December to May and the dry season from June to November. Coastal Ecuador can have approximately 17 rain days (defined as > 0.1 mm) per month during the rainy season and approximately 2-3 rain days per month during the dry season. The Amazon Region gets more consistent rain throughout the year with approximately 16-24 days per month, while the Andean Highlands receive more rain (approximately 20 days per month) in the wet season and less (approximately 7 days per month) in the dry season. The Galápagos Islands receive approximately 6-10 days of rain per month during the wet season, typically peaking in February, and 1-5 days of rain per month during the dry season, with the driest month being October.

== Extreme weather ==
=== El Niño/ La Niña ===
El Niño is the climate pattern describing warm sea temperature in the Pacific Ocean west of the South Americas. This phenomenon happens every 2-7 years, giving countries such as Ecuador a significant amount of precipitation. Over 50% of extreme precipitation during El Niño falls on low-lying areas under 150 meters (490 feet) - land that represents about 40% of Ecuador’s most critical agriculture zones and oil production sites that is a majority of the country’s economy.

La Niña is the climate pattern describing the cooling of the ocean surface temperature. This phenomenon brings in stronger winds and causes drier conditions, leading to droughts in the South America - including Ecuador. Less rain impacts Ecuador’s agriculture just like El Niño affects it due to heavy rain. Drought in Ecuador hinders proper fruit production and plants may not be able to attain the “grading” needed for exportation.

=== Flooding, droughts, landslides ===
Ecuador's physiography is the leading cause of flooding, droughts, and landslides. The v-shaped, deep valleys that make up part of Ecuador have been the biggest driver of successive wet seasons. During drought periods, valley slopes dry and become unstable. When strong rain returns, these slopes can create muddy landslides. The lack of direct drainage leads to water-logged surfaces and the formation of multiple sinkholes. Ecuador’s land is vulnerable due to weak land regulations, unplanned urban growth, and the country experiencing heavy rains to droughts.

=== Glacial retreat and water scarcity ===
Over 99% of tropical glaciers are in the Andes but have been recently melting away due to climate change and increasing temperatures. 50%-90% of Ecuador’s freshwater comes from the mountainous glaciers in the Andes. Tropical glaciers are also sensitive to climate change because it is imperative they maintain a constant temperature throughout the year. With the continuous increase of temperatures, freshwater supplies in Ecuador are expected to continually decline.

== Climate change ==
Climate change vulnerability assessments in Ecuador conducted in 2015 show that major cities, such as Quito and Guayaquil have the lowest vulnerability to climate change impacts, however, regions in which approximately 20% of the national population lives are very highly vulnerable to climate change. These regions include the perimeter, such as the East and Coastal Regions. Populations in highly vulnerable areas tend to also be underprivileged having lower literacy rates, less access to garbage collection, less sewage treatment services, and less access to health and social security coverage.

== Climate Data ==
Climate data for Quito
| Month | Jan | Feb | Mar | Apr | May | Jun | Jul | Aug | Sep | Oct | Nov | Dec | Year |
|---|---|---|---|---|---|---|---|---|---|---|---|---|---|
| Record high °C (°F) | 33.0 (91.4) | 28.6 (83.5) | 32.0 (89.6) | 25.6 (78.1) | 30.4 (86.7) | 29.0 (84.2) | 31.0 (87.8) | 27.0 (80.6) | 29.0 (84.2) | 27.0 (80.6) | 29.3 (84.7) | 29.0 (84.2) | 33.0 (91.4) |
| Mean daily maximum °C (°F) | 21.2 (70.2) | 21.0 (69.8) | 20.8 (69.4) | 20.9 (69.6) | 21.0 (69.8) | 21.1 (70.0) | 21.5 (70.7) | 22.2 (72.0) | 22.3 (72.1) | 21.8 (71.2) | 21.3 (70.3) | 21.3 (70.3) | 21.4 (70.5) |
| Daily mean °C (°F) | 15.5 (59.9) | 15.6 (60.1) | 15.5 (59.9) | 15.6 (60.1) | 15.6 (60.1) | 15.5 (59.9) | 15.5 (59.9) | 15.9 (60.6) | 15.9 (60.6) | 15.7 (60.3) | 15.5 (59.9) | 15.5 (59.9) | 15.6 (60.1) |
| Mean daily minimum °C (°F) | 9.8 (49.6) | 10.1 (50.2) | 10.1 (50.2) | 10.2 (50.4) | 10.1 (50.2) | 9.8 (49.6) | 9.4 (48.9) | 9.6 (49.3) | 9.4 (48.9) | 9.5 (49.1) | 9.6 (49.3) | 9.7 (49.5) | 9.8 (49.6) |
| Record low °C (°F) | 3.0 (37.4) | 4.7 (40.5) | 5.1 (41.2) | 5.3 (41.5) | 2.5 (36.5) | 3.0 (37.4) | 3.0 (37.4) | 2.2 (36.0) | 3.4 (38.1) | 4.2 (39.6) | 2.5 (36.5) | 2.5 (36.5) | 2.2 (36.0) |
| Average precipitation mm (inches) | 82.5 (3.25) | 111.0 (4.37) | 146.6 (5.77) | 171.2 (6.74) | 105.5 (4.15) | 39.5 (1.56) | 21.5 (0.85) | 27.7 (1.09) | 68.9 (2.71) | 114.9 (4.52) | 108.5 (4.27) | 100.4 (3.95) | 1,098.2 (43.24) |
| Average precipitation days (≥ 1.0 mm) | 10 | 11 | 15 | 15 | 13 | 7 | 5 | 5 | 11 | 14 | 11 | 11 | 128 |
| Mean monthly sunshine hours | 197 | 140 | 122 | 136 | 164 | 189 | 249 | 256 | 196 | 177 | 197 | 215 | 2,238 |
Source 1: World Meteorological Organization, (precipitation data),
Source 2: NOAA Voodoo Skies (records), Danish Meteorological Institute (sun and relative humidity)

Climate data for Guayaquil
| Month | Jan | Feb | Mar | Apr | May | Jun | Jul | Aug | Sep | Oct | Nov | Dec | Year |
|---|---|---|---|---|---|---|---|---|---|---|---|---|---|
| Record high °C (°F) | 37.2 (99.0) | 35.4 (95.7) | 37.3 (99.1) | 35.8 (96.4) | 35.2 (95.4) | 35.0 (95.0) | 34.1 (93.4) | 34.7 (94.5) | 34.4 (93.9) | 35.1 (95.2) | 35.4 (95.7) | 36.7 (98.1) | 37.3 (99.1) |
| Mean daily maximum °C (°F) | 31.2 (88.2) | 31.2 (88.2) | 32.2 (90.0) | 32.0 (89.6) | 31.2 (88.2) | 29.8 (85.6) | 29.1 (84.4) | 29.7 (85.5) | 30.5 (86.9) | 30.2 (86.4) | 31.1 (88.0) | 31.8 (89.2) | 30.8 (87.4) |
| Daily mean °C (°F) | 27.1 (80.8) | 27.3 (81.1) | 28.0 (82.4) | 27.8 (82.0) | 26.9 (80.4) | 25.7 (78.3) | 25.0 (77.0) | 25.2 (77.4) | 25.5 (77.9) | 25.6 (78.1) | 26.2 (79.2) | 27.1 (80.8) | 26.5 (79.7) |
| Mean daily minimum °C (°F) | 23.0 (73.4) | 23.4 (74.1) | 23.7 (74.7) | 23.5 (74.3) | 22.6 (72.7) | 21.5 (70.7) | 20.8 (69.4) | 20.7 (69.3) | 20.5 (68.9) | 20.9 (69.6) | 21.3 (70.3) | 22.4 (72.3) | 22.0 (71.6) |
| Record low °C (°F) | 20.0 (68.0) | 15.8 (60.4) | 19.9 (67.8) | 19.4 (66.9) | 18.5 (65.3) | 17.6 (63.7) | 17.0 (62.6) | 17.2 (63.0) | 17.2 (63.0) | 17.8 (64.0) | 17.0 (62.6) | 18.0 (64.4) | 15.8 (60.4) |
| Average precipitation mm (inches) | 200.7 (7.90) | 332.0 (13.07) | 315.7 (12.43) | 207.7 (8.18) | 62.6 (2.46) | 34.0 (1.34) | 15.6 (0.61) | 1.2 (0.05) | 1.5 (0.06) | 5.6 (0.22) | 29.1 (1.15) | 68.0 (2.68) | 1,263.2 (49.73) |
| Average precipitation days (≥ 1.0 mm) | 12 | 14 | 15 | 10 | 4 | 1 | 0 | 0 | 0 | 1 | 0 | 2 | 59 |
Source 1: World Meteorological Organization
Source 2: NOAA

Climate data for Cuenca
| Month | Jan | Feb | Mar | Apr | May | Jun | Jul | Aug | Sep | Oct | Nov | Dec | Year |
|---|---|---|---|---|---|---|---|---|---|---|---|---|---|
| Record high °C (°F) | 33.0 (91.4) | 29.9 (85.8) | 28.8 (83.8) | 33.0 (91.4) | 32.0 (89.6) | 31.6 (88.9) | 29.5 (85.1) | 34.0 (93.2) | 31.2 (88.2) | 33.0 (91.4) | 33.0 (91.4) | 33.0 (91.4) | 34.0 (93.2) |
| Mean daily maximum °C (°F) | 22.4 (72.3) | 22.4 (72.3) | 21.9 (71.4) | 21.7 (71.1) | 21.4 (70.5) | 20.4 (68.7) | 19.9 (67.8) | 20.4 (68.7) | 21.3 (70.3) | 22.3 (72.1) | 23.1 (73.6) | 23.1 (73.6) | 21.7 (71.0) |
| Daily mean °C (°F) | 15.3 (59.5) | 15.8 (60.4) | 15.6 (60.1) | 15.3 (59.5) | 14.4 (57.9) | 13.6 (56.5) | 13.3 (55.9) | 13.3 (55.9) | 14.7 (58.5) | 15.3 (59.5) | 14.7 (58.5) | 15.6 (60.1) | 14.7 (58.5) |
| Mean daily minimum °C (°F) | 10.9 (51.6) | 11.1 (52.0) | 11.2 (52.2) | 10.9 (51.6) | 10.6 (51.1) | 9.8 (49.6) | 9.4 (48.9) | 9.1 (48.4) | 9.5 (49.1) | 10.1 (50.2) | 10.2 (50.4) | 10.6 (51.1) | 10.3 (50.5) |
| Record low °C (°F) | 0.0 (32.0) | 0.0 (32.0) | 1.0 (33.8) | 1.0 (33.8) | 0.0 (32.0) | −0.6 (30.9) | −3.0 (26.6) | −1.1 (30.0) | −1.0 (30.2) | −2.0 (28.4) | −0.6 (30.9) | 0.0 (32.0) | −3.0 (26.6) |
| Average rainfall mm (inches) | 67 (2.6) | 85 (3.3) | 107 (4.2) | 109 (4.3) | 77 (3.0) | 68 (2.7) | 53 (2.1) | 47 (1.9) | 56 (2.2) | 73 (2.9) | 69 (2.7) | 67 (2.6) | 878 (34.5) |
| Average rainy days (≥ 0.1 mm) | 20 | 21 | 22 | 19 | 15 | 11 | 10 | 10 | 12 | 16 | 13 | 10 | 179 |
| Mean monthly sunshine hours | 155 | 113 | 124 | 120 | 155 | 150 | 186 | 186 | 150 | 155 | 150 | 155 | 1,799 |
Source 1: Temperatures: Climate Ecuador, Voodoo Skies
Source 2: Other: Cuenca Climate Guide

Climate data for Manta
| Month | Jan | Feb | Mar | Apr | May | Jun | Jul | Aug | Sep | Oct | Nov | Dec | Year |
|---|---|---|---|---|---|---|---|---|---|---|---|---|---|
| Record high °C (°F) | 35.0 (95.0) | 34.4 (93.9) | 34.4 (93.9) | 35.6 (96.1) | 34.4 (93.9) | 35.0 (95.0) | 35.0 (95.0) | 35.6 (96.1) | 32.8 (91.0) | 33.3 (91.9) | 32.2 (90.0) | 32.2 (90.0) | 35.6 (96.1) |
| Mean daily maximum °C (°F) | 30.0 (86.0) | 30.0 (86.0) | 30.6 (87.1) | 30.6 (87.1) | 30.6 (87.1) | 29.4 (84.9) | 28.9 (84.0) | 29.4 (84.9) | 28.9 (84.0) | 28.9 (84.0) | 29.4 (84.9) | 29.4 (84.9) | 29.7 (85.4) |
| Daily mean °C (°F) | 26.1 (79.0) | 26.1 (79.0) | 26.4 (79.5) | 26.4 (79.5) | 26.15 (79.07) | 25.25 (77.45) | 24.75 (76.55) | 24.7 (76.5) | 24.45 (76.01) | 24.45 (76.01) | 25 (77) | 25.25 (77.45) | 25.42 (77.75) |
| Mean daily minimum °C (°F) | 22.2 (72.0) | 22.2 (72.0) | 22.2 (72.0) | 22.2 (72.0) | 21.7 (71.1) | 21.1 (70.0) | 20.6 (69.1) | 20.0 (68.0) | 20.0 (68.0) | 20.0 (68.0) | 20.6 (69.1) | 21.1 (70.0) | 21.2 (70.1) |
| Record low °C (°F) | 17.2 (63.0) | 17.2 (63.0) | 13.0 (55.4) | 17.2 (63.0) | 17.2 (63.0) | 13.3 (55.9) | 16.1 (61.0) | 15.0 (59.0) | 15.0 (59.0) | 14.4 (57.9) | 15.6 (60.1) | 15.6 (60.1) | 13.0 (55.4) |
| Average rainfall mm (inches) | 40.6 (1.60) | 96.5 (3.80) | 68.6 (2.70) | 25.4 (1.00) | 2.5 (0.10) | 5.1 (0.20) | 5.1 (0.20) | 0.8 (0.03) | 0.8 (0.03) | 0.8 (0.03) | 2.5 (0.10) | 5.1 (0.20) | 253.8 (9.99) |
| Mean monthly sunshine hours | 124 | 113 | 155 | 150 | 124 | 90 | 93 | 93 | 90 | 93 | 90 | 93 | 1,308 |
Source 1: Sistema de Clasificación Bioclimática Mundial
Source 2: World Climate Guide (sunshine only)

Climate data for Machala
| Month | Jan | Feb | Mar | Apr | May | Jun | Jul | Aug | Sep | Oct | Nov | Dec | Year |
|---|---|---|---|---|---|---|---|---|---|---|---|---|---|
| Mean daily maximum °C (°F) | 30.4 (86.7) | 30.9 (87.6) | 31.0 (87.8) | 31.1 (88.0) | 29.8 (85.6) | 27.8 (82.0) | 27.0 (80.6) | 26.6 (79.9) | 27.0 (80.6) | 26.9 (80.4) | 28.0 (82.4) | 29.7 (85.5) | 28.9 (83.9) |
| Mean daily minimum °C (°F) | 22.6 (72.7) | 22.8 (73.0) | 22.9 (73.2) | 23.1 (73.6) | 22.7 (72.9) | 21.5 (70.7) | 20.8 (69.4) | 20.1 (68.2) | 20.2 (68.4) | 20.7 (69.3) | 21.0 (69.8) | 21.8 (71.2) | 21.7 (71.0) |
| Average rainfall mm (inches) | 71 (2.8) | 111 (4.4) | 116 (4.6) | 69 (2.7) | 24 (0.9) | 14 (0.6) | 12 (0.5) | 11 (0.4) | 11 (0.4) | 16 (0.6) | 13 (0.5) | 21 (0.8) | 489 (19.2) |
Source: Climate Data

Climate data for San Cristóbal Island, Galápagos Islands (1981–2010 normals)
| Month | Jan | Feb | Mar | Apr | May | Jun | Jul | Aug | Sep | Oct | Nov | Dec | Year |
|---|---|---|---|---|---|---|---|---|---|---|---|---|---|
| Mean daily maximum °C (°F) | 29.2 (84.6) | 30.3 (86.5) | 30.5 (86.9) | 30.2 (86.4) | 29.2 (84.6) | 27.6 (81.7) | 26.4 (79.5) | 25.6 (78.1) | 25.7 (78.3) | 26.0 (78.8) | 27.0 (80.6) | 27.8 (82.0) | 28.0 (82.3) |
| Daily mean °C (°F) | 26.1 (79.0) | 26.7 (80.1) | 26.7 (80.1) | 26.5 (79.7) | 25.9 (78.6) | 24.7 (76.5) | 23.5 (74.3) | 22.7 (72.9) | 22.8 (73.0) | 23.0 (73.4) | 23.9 (75.0) | 24.8 (76.6) | 24.8 (76.6) |
| Mean daily minimum °C (°F) | 22.9 (73.2) | 23.1 (73.6) | 22.9 (73.2) | 22.8 (73.0) | 22.7 (72.9) | 21.7 (71.1) | 20.7 (69.3) | 19.8 (67.6) | 19.8 (67.6) | 20.0 (68.0) | 20.9 (69.6) | 21.7 (71.1) | 21.6 (70.9) |
| Average precipitation mm (inches) | 83.4 (3.28) | 107.4 (4.23) | 106.3 (4.19) | 94.9 (3.74) | 41.9 (1.65) | 32.5 (1.28) | 18.8 (0.74) | 9.8 (0.39) | 7.6 (0.30) | 11.0 (0.43) | 12.6 (0.50) | 51.5 (2.03) | 577.7 (22.76) |
| Average precipitation days | 11 | 10 | 11 | 6 | 5 | 8 | 13 | 14 | 12 | 11 | 8 | 10 | 119 |
Source: World Meteorological Organization

== See also ==
- Climate
