= Climate change in Grenada =

Climate change in Grenada has received significant public and political attention in Grenada. As of 2013, the mitigation of its effects has been high on the agenda of the Government of Grenada, which seeks to set an example through innovation and green technology.

== Greenhouse gas emissions ==
Grenada electricity production 1980-2019

Given its small size, Grenada is not a major contributor to greenhouse gas emissions, but does use fossil fuel to generate most of its electricity. The Government of Grenada has set a goal of generating 50% of its energy from solar and wind power by 2030, and is taking steps to abolish Grenlec, the state-run electric utility. Because tourism is a mainstay of the economy, there is also interest in exploring the use of seawater for air-conditioning.

== Mitigation and adaptation ==
=== Adaptation ===
As of 2013, Grenada had a US$6.9 million pilot project to adapt its irrigation system to climate change and conduct local and regional water planning, funded by the German International Climate Initiative (IKI). Groundwater depletion, lower water tables, disruption of water supply by hurricanes (such as Hurricane Ivan), saltwater intrusion, and rising sea levels pose challenges for providing a consistent water supply for agriculture and tourism.

== Society and culture ==
=== Activism ===
In 2013, the newspaper The Washington Diplomat profiled Grenada's ambassador to the United States, Angus Friday, who has served as a "senior climate policy specialist at the World Bank." In his earlier posting as Grenadian Ambassador to the United Nations, "he frequently advocated for small Caribbean and Pacific island nations threatened by rising ocean levels."

== See also ==
- Climate change in the Caribbean
