= Climate change in the United States Virgin Islands =

Impacts and responses of the US Virgin Islands related to climate change

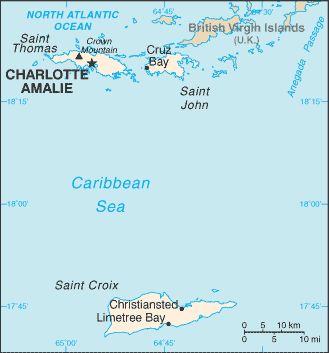
Map of the United States Virgin Islands

Climate change in the United States Virgin Islands encompasses the effects of climate change, attributed to man-made increases in atmospheric carbon dioxide, in the U.S. territory of the United States Virgin Islands. The United States Environmental Protection Agency (EPA) has noted a variety of expected consequences of this phenomenon.

== Ocean warming and sea level rise ==
The EPA notes that "waters around the U.S. Virgin Islands have warmed by nearly two degrees since 1901, and sea level has been rising by about an inch every ten years. As the oceans and atmosphere continue to warm, sea level is likely to rise one to three feet in the next century. Rising sea level submerges marshes, mangroves, and dry land; erodes beaches; and exacerbates coastal flooding. Although most of the territory is well above sea level, the waterfront blocks of Charlotte Amalie are generally within three or four feet of sea level".

== Coral reefs and ocean acidification ==
According to the EPA, "in the next several decades, warming waters are likely to harm most coral reefs, and widespread loss of coral is likely due to warming and increasing acidity of coastal waters. Rising water temperatures can harm the algae that live inside corals and provide food for them. This loss of algae weakens corals and can eventually kill them. This process is commonly known as “coral bleaching” because the loss of algae also causes corals to turn white".

The EPA further notes that "increasing acidity can also damage corals. Ocean acidity has increased by about 25 percent in the past three centuries, and it is likely to increase another 40 to 50 percent by 2100. As the ocean becomes more acidic, corals are less able to remove minerals from the water to build their skeletons. Shellfish and other organisms also depend on these minerals, and acidity interferes with their ability to build protective skeletons and shells".

The EPA also notes that "Warming and acidification could harm the U.S. Virgin Islands' marine ecosystems and economic activities that depend on them. Coral reefs provide critical habitat for a diverse range of species, while shellfish and small shell-producing plankton are an important source of food for larger animals. Healthy reefs and fish populations support fisheries and tourism".

== Storms, homes, and infrastructure ==
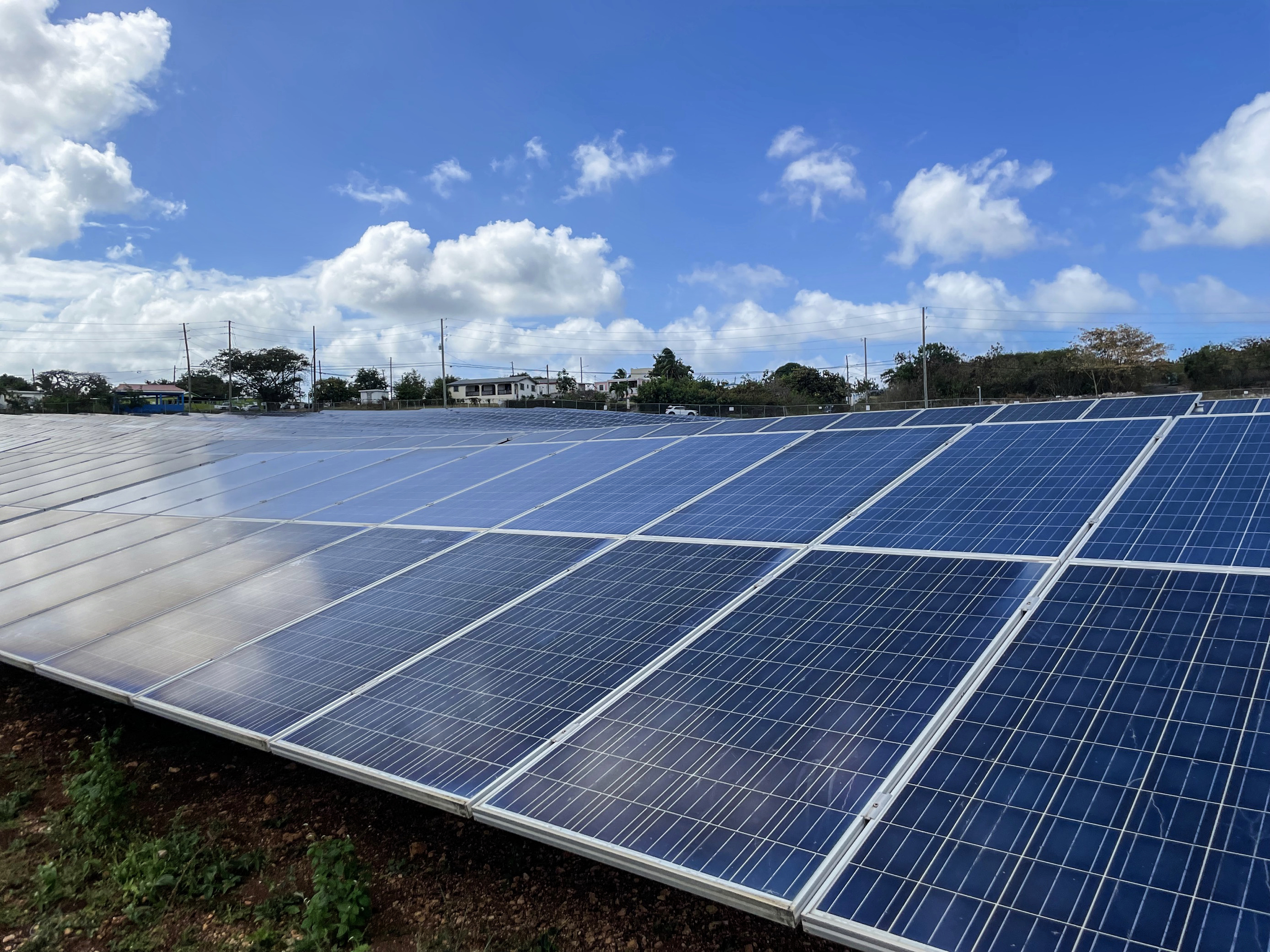
Spanish Town Solar Farm in St. Croix, March 2023

The EPA reports that "tropical storms and hurricanes have become more intense during the past 20 years. Although warming oceans provide these storms with more potential energy, scientists are not sure whether the recent intensification reflects a long-term trend. Nevertheless, hurricane wind speeds and rainfall rates are likely to increase as the climate continues to warm. Towns, roads, and ports in the U.S. Virgin Islands are vulnerable to the impacts of both winds and water during storms. Greater wind speeds and the resulting damages can make insurance for wind damage more expensive or difficult to obtain. Coastal homes and infrastructure are likely to flood more often as sea level rises because storm surges will become higher as well. As a result, rising sea level is likely to increase flood insurance premiums for people living along the coast".

The EPA further notes that "the changing climate is also likely to increase inland flooding. Rainfall during heavy storms has increased by 33 percent in neighboring Puerto Rico since 1958, and similar trends have been seen throughout the Caribbean. The trend toward increasingly heavy rainstorms is likely to continue. More intense rainstorms can increase flooding as dry guts resemble rivers more frequently, and more water accumulates in lowlying areas that drain slowly. In 2010, for example, flash flooding washed out sections of roadway in Frederiksted".

The EPA has also said that despite heavy rainstorms becoming more common, "shifting weather patterns have caused total rainfall to decrease in the Caribbean region. Total rainfall is likely to continue to decrease, especially during spring and summer. Warmer temperatures also reduce the amount of water available because they increase the rate at which water evaporates (or transpires) into the air from soils, plants, and surface waters. With less rain and drier soils, the U.S. Virgin Islands may face an increased risk of drought, which in turn can affect water supplies, agriculture, and the economy. For example, during the 2015 drought, farmers lost crops and livestock, and some residents could no longer depend on rainwater collection or ground water, and had to instead rely on water from desalination plants, delivered by truck".

== Forests ==
According to the EPA, "warmer temperatures and changes in rainfall could expand, shrink, or shift the ranges of forest plants and animals, depending on the conditions that each species requires. For example, as summer rainfall decreases, plant species that prefer drier conditions could move into areas once dominated by wet forest species. Many tropical plants and animals live in places where the temperature range is fairly steady year-round, so they cannot necessarily tolerate significant changes in temperature".

== Agriculture ==
According to the EPA, "higher temperatures are likely to interfere with agricultural productivity in the U.S. Virgin Islands. Hot temperatures threaten animals’ health and cause them to eat less and grow more slowly. Reduced water availability during the dry season could stress crops, while warmer temperatures could also reduce yields of certain crops. Studies in other tropical countries indicate that climate change may reduce plantain and banana yields. If storms become more severe, sugar cane crops in neighboring countries may be harmed more often, which could affect the availability of imported molasses for the rum industry".

== Human health ==
The EPA cautions that certain people are especially vulnerable to increased heat, including children, the elderly, the sick, and the poor. The agency asserts that "rising temperatures will increase the frequency of hot days and warm nights. High air temperatures can cause heat stroke and dehydration and affect people’s cardiovascular and nervous systems. Warm nights are especially dangerous because they prevent the human body from cooling after a hot day. Although reliable long-term temperature records for the U.S. Virgin Islands are unavailable, the frequency of warm nights in nearby Puerto Rico has increased by about 50 percent since 1950".

The EPA further notes that "the U.S. Virgin Islands' climate is suitable for mosquito species that carry diseases such as malaria, yellow fever, and dengue fever. While the transmission of disease depends on a variety of conditions, higher air temperatures are likely to accelerate the mosquito life cycle and the rate at which viruses replicate in mosquitoes".

With respect to water-related illnesses, the EPA cautions that higher temperatures increase the risk of infectious agents such as vibriosis, a bacterial infection that can come from direct contact with contaminated water or eating infected shellfish, and ciguatera fish poisoning from eating fish that contain a toxic substance produced by a type of algae found in this area.
