= Climate of Paraguay =

Paraguay map of Köppen climate classification.

The climate of Paraguay consists of a subtropical climate in the Paranaense region, and tropical and semi-arid climates in the Chaco. The Paranaense region has a humid climate, with abundant rainfall throughout the year and only moderate seasonal changes in temperature.

The seasons in Paraguay are opposite to those in the northern hemisphere, meaning northern summer is Paraguayan winter, and vice versa.

During summer, the dominant influence on the climate is the warm sirocco winds blowing out of the northeast.

During the winter, the dominant wind is the cold pampero from the South Atlantic, which blows across Argentina and is deflected northeastward by the Andes in the southern part of that country. Because of the lack of topographic barriers within Paraguay, these opposite prevailing winds bring about abrupt and irregular changes in the usually moderate weather. Winds are generally brisk. Velocities of 160 kilometres per hour (99 mph) have been reported in southern locations, and the town of Encarnación was once leveled by a tornado.

== Paranaense region ==
=== Winter ===
During July, the coldest month of the subtropical winter in the Southern Hemisphere, temperature averages about 17 °C (63 °F) in Asunción and slightly cooler on the Paraná Plateau. Temperature varies only insignificantly with latitude. The number of days with temperatures falling below freezing ranges from as few as 3 to as many as 16 yearly, and with even wider variations deep in the interior. Some very mild winters with winds blowing constantly from the north feature little frost.

During a cold winter, however, tongues of Antarctic air bring subfreezing temperatures to all areas. No part of the Paranaense region is entirely free from risk of frost and consequent damage to crops, and various locations report snow flurries occasionally.

=== Summer ===
Moist tropical air keeps the weather warm in the Paranaense region from October through March. In Asunción the temperature averages about 27.96 °C (82.33 °F) during January, the warmest month.

During the summer, daytime temperatures fairly commonly reach 38 °C (100 °F). Frequent waves of cool air from the south, however, cause weather that alternates between clear, humid conditions and storms.

=== Precipitation ===
Fairly evenly distributed rain falls in the Paranaense region. Although local meteorological conditions play a contributing role, rain usually falls in dominant tropical air masses. The least rain falls in August, when averages in various parts of the region range from 100 millimetres (3.9 in) to 200 millimetres (7.9 in). The two periods of maximum precipitation are March through May and October to November.

For the region as a whole, the difference between the driest and the wettest months ranges from 100 millimetres (3.9 in) to 180 millimetres (7.1 in). The annual average rainfall is 1,270 millimetres (50 in), although the average on the Paraná Plateau is 250 millimetres (9.8 in) to 380 millimetres (15 in) greater. All subregions may experience considerable variations from year to year. Asunción has recorded from as little as 793 millimetres (31.2 in) total annual rainfall to as much as 1,518 millimetres (59.8 in) total annual rainfall. Puerto Bertoni on the Paraná Plateau has recorded as little as 790 millimetres (31 in) to as much as 3,300 millimetres (130 in) total annual rainfall.

== Chaco ==
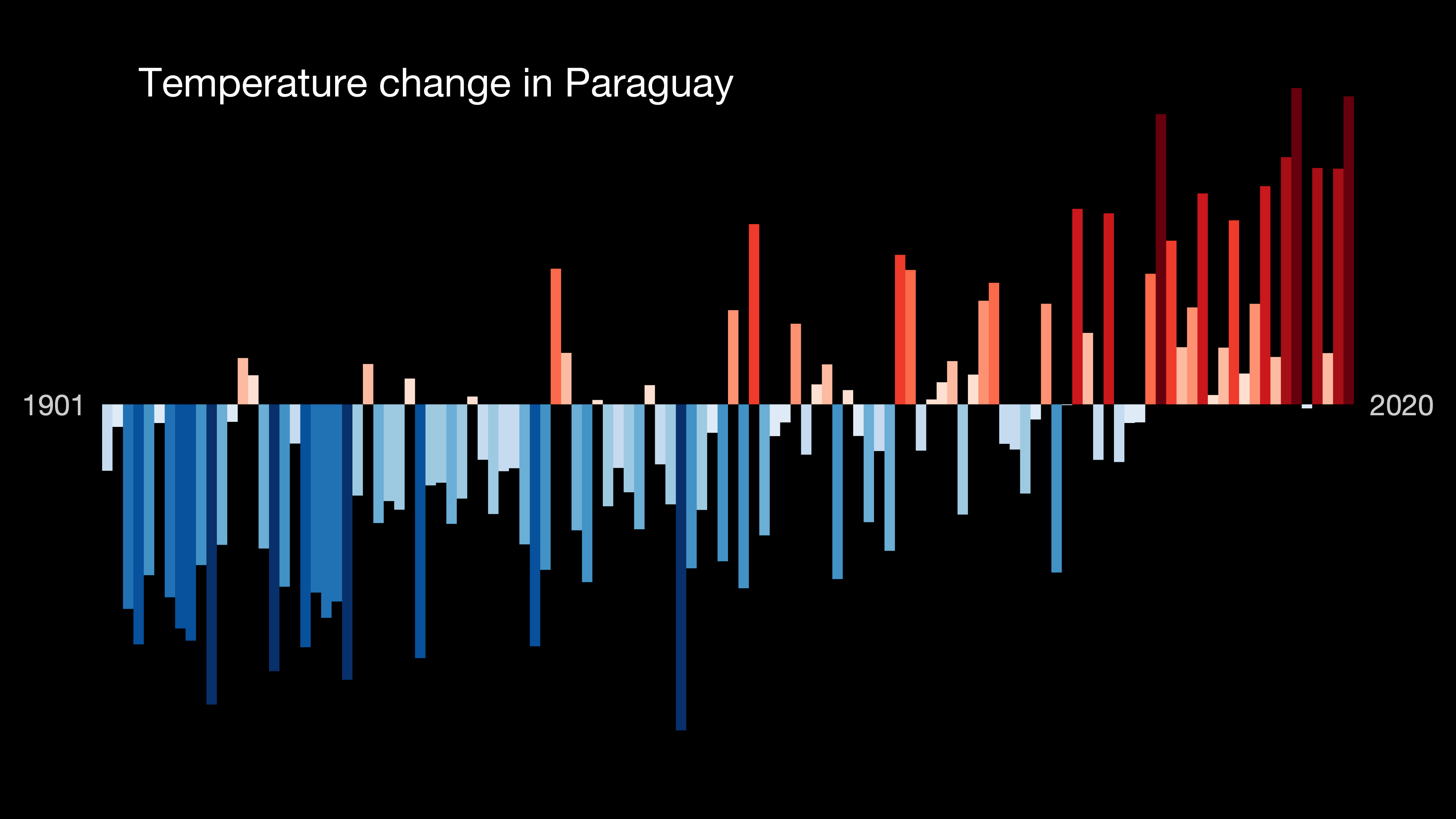
Temperature change in Paraguay since 1901 in the context of global warming.

In contrast to the Paranaense region, the Chaco has a tropical wet-and-dry climate bordering on semi-arid. The Chaco experiences seasons that alternately flood and parch the land, yet seasonal variations in temperature are modest. Chaco temperatures are usually high; the temperature drops only slightly in winter. Even at night the air is stifling despite the usually present breezes. Rainfall is light, varying from 500 to 1,000 millimeters (19.7 to 39.4 in) per year, except in the higher land to the northwest where it can be somewhat greater. Rainfall is concentrated in the summer months, and extensive areas that are deserts in winter become summer swamps.

== Sustainability ==
In 2017, youth activist Diana Vicezar established a community-based organisation designed to tackle elements of the climate crisis and animal welfare. Paraguay has a large issue with abandoned dogs, as well as plastic pollution, so Vicezar established Mymba Rayhu to build shelter for these free-ranging dogs using recycled materials.

== Examples ==
Climate data for Asunción (1971–2000)
Month	Jan	Feb	Mar	Apr	May	Jun	Jul	Aug	Sep	Oct	Nov	Dec	Year
Record high °C (°F)	42.0 (107.6)	39.6 (103.3)	40.0 (104.0)	37 (99)	35 (95)	33.0 (91.4)	33.4 (92.1)	39.2 (102.6)	42.2 (108.0)	42.8 (109.0)	40.2 (104.4)	41.7 (107.1)	42.8 (109.0)
Mean daily maximum °C (°F)	33.5 (92.3)	32.6 (90.7)	31.6 (88.9)	28.4 (83.1)	25.0 (77.0)	23.1 (73.6)	21.9 (71.4)	24.8 (76.6)	26.4 (79.5)	29.2 (84.6)	30.7 (87.3)	32.3 (90.1)	28.3 (82.9)
Daily mean °C (°F)	27.5 (81.5)	26.9 (80.4)	25.9 (78.6)	22.8 (73.0)	19.8 (67.6)	17.9 (64.2)	17.1 (62.8)	18.6 (65.5)	20.5 (68.9)	23.2 (73.8)	24.8 (76.6)	26.5 (79.7)	22.7 (72.9)
Mean daily minimum °C (°F)	22.8 (73.0)	22.3 (72.1)	21.3 (70.3)	18.6 (65.5)	15.7 (60.3)	13.8 (56.8)	13.6 (56.5)	14.3 (57.7)	15.9 (60.6)	18.6 (65.5)	20.1 (68.2)	21.8 (71.2)	17.9 (64.2)
Record low °C (°F)	12.5 (54.5)	12.5 (54.5)	9.4 (48.9)	6.8 (44.2)	2.6 (36.7)	−1.2 (29.8)	−0.6 (30.9)	0.0 (32.0)	3.6 (38.5)	7.0 (44.6)	8.8 (47.8)	10.0 (50.0)	−1.2 (29.8)
Average rainfall mm (inches)	147.2 (5.80)	129.2 (5.09)	117.9 (4.64)	166.0 (6.54)	113.3 (4.46)	82.4 (3.24)	39.4 (1.55)	72.6 (2.86)	87.7 (3.45)	130.8 (5.15)	164.4 (6.47)	150.3 (5.92)	1,401.2 (55.17)
Average precipitation days (≥ 1.0 mm)	8	7	7	8	7	7	4	5	6	8	8	8	83
Average relative humidity (%)	68	71	72	75	76	76	70	70	66	67	67	68	70
Mean monthly sunshine hours	276	246	254	228	205	165	195	223	204	242	270	295	2,803
Source 1: World Meteorological Organization
Source 2: NOAA updated to 9/2012., Danish Meteorological Institute (sun only)

Climate data for Ciudad del Este
Month	Jan	Feb	Mar	Apr	May	Jun	Jul	Aug	Sep	Oct	Nov	Dec	Year
Record high °C (°F)	38.0 (100.4)	38.8 (101.8)	38.0 (100.4)	35.0 (95.0)	32.5 (90.5)	31.2 (88.2)	33.0 (91.4)	33.4 (92.1)	35.6 (96.1)	37.0 (98.6)	39.6 (103.3)	40.6 (105.1)	40.6 (105.1)
Mean daily maximum °C (°F)	31.7 (89.1)	31.6 (88.9)	30.8 (87.4)	27.5 (81.5)	24.6 (76.3)	22.2 (72.0)	23.0 (73.4)	24.2 (75.6)	25.8 (78.4)	28.4 (83.1)	30.1 (86.2)	31.2 (88.2)	27.6 (81.7)
Daily mean °C (°F)	26.1 (79.0)	25.8 (78.4)	24.7 (76.5)	21.5 (70.7)	18.4 (65.1)	16.3 (61.3)	16.4 (61.5)	17.6 (63.7)	19.3 (66.7)	22.1 (71.8)	24.1 (75.4)	25.6 (78.1)	21.5 (70.7)
Mean daily minimum °C (°F)	21.1 (70.0)	21.3 (70.3)	20.1 (68.2)	17.2 (63.0)	13.6 (56.5)	11.4 (52.5)	11.3 (52.3)	12.3 (54.1)	13.8 (56.8)	16.6 (61.9)	18.3 (64.9)	20.1 (68.2)	16.4 (61.5)
Record low °C (°F)	10.5 (50.9)	11.6 (52.9)	7.5 (45.5)	4.6 (40.3)	−0.2 (31.6)	0.0 (32.0)	−3.0 (26.6)	−1.0 (30.2)	0.8 (33.4)	4.0 (39.2)	6.4 (43.5)	8.2 (46.8)	−3.0 (26.6)
Average precipitation mm (inches)	184.1 (7.25)	154.2 (6.07)	136.1 (5.36)	140.7 (5.54)	132.3 (5.21)	131.9 (5.19)	90.6 (3.57)	115.0 (4.53)	130.2 (5.13)	176.0 (6.93)	163.5 (6.44)	139.9 (5.51)	1,694.5 (66.71)
Average precipitation days (≥ 0.1 mm)	10	9	8	7	8	8	7	8	9	10	9	9	101
Average relative humidity (%)	75	77	77	80	83	84	79	77	75	74	72	72	77
Source: NOAA

Climate data for Encarnación (1961–1990)
Month	Jan	Feb	Mar	Apr	May	Jun	Jul	Aug	Sep	Oct	Nov	Dec	Year
Record high °C (°F)	40.5 (104.9)	39.4 (102.9)	39.3 (102.7)	35.4 (95.7)	34.0 (93.2)	31.6 (88.9)	32.4 (90.3)	34.8 (94.6)	36.6 (97.9)	38.0 (100.4)	40.4 (104.7)	42.0 (107.6)	42.0 (107.6)
Mean daily maximum °C (°F)	31.2 (88.2)	30.6 (87.1)	29.2 (84.6)	25.9 (78.6)	23.2 (73.8)	20.9 (69.6)	21.4 (70.5)	22.5 (72.5)	23.9 (75.0)	26.5 (79.7)	28.4 (83.1)	30.5 (86.9)	26.2 (79.2)
Daily mean °C (°F)	25.5 (77.9)	24.9 (76.8)	23.4 (74.1)	20.0 (68.0)	17.3 (63.1)	15.2 (59.4)	15.5 (59.9)	16.6 (61.9)	18.1 (64.6)	20.6 (69.1)	22.7 (72.9)	24.8 (76.6)	20.4 (68.7)
Mean daily minimum °C (°F)	19.4 (66.9)	19.5 (67.1)	17.9 (64.2)	14.3 (57.7)	11.7 (53.1)	9.9 (49.8)	10.2 (50.4)	10.8 (51.4)	12.3 (54.1)	14.3 (57.7)	16.3 (61.3)	18.3 (64.9)	14.6 (58.3)
Record low °C (°F)	9.3 (48.7)	7.0 (44.6)	5.4 (41.7)	2.4 (36.3)	−1.7 (28.9)	−3.8 (25.2)	−3.8 (25.2)	−2.8 (27.0)	−0.6 (30.9)	1.6 (34.9)	4.8 (40.6)	7.0 (44.6)	−3.8 (25.2)
Average precipitation mm (inches)	152.2 (5.99)	160.6 (6.32)	142.4 (5.61)	162.2 (6.39)	144.2 (5.68)	135.8 (5.35)	102.7 (4.04)	116.9 (4.60)	149.5 (5.89)	181.7 (7.15)	161.5 (6.36)	150.0 (5.91)	1,759.7 (69.28)
Average precipitation days (≥ 0.1 mm)	9	8	7	8	7	8	8	8	9	9	9	9	98
Average relative humidity (%)	69	74	75	77	79	78	76	74	72	70	69	67	73
Mean monthly sunshine hours	254.2	220.4	220.1	171.0	179.8	159.0	189.1	182.9	153.0	201.5	252.0	269.7	2,452.7
Mean daily sunshine hours	8.2	7.8	7.1	5.7	5.8	5.3	6.1	5.9	5.1	6.5	8.4	8.7	6.7
Source 1: NOAA
Source 2: Deutscher Wetterdienst (sun, 1988–1996)

Climate data for Concepción (1961–1990, extremes 1937–present)
Month	Jan	Feb	Mar	Apr	May	Jun	Jul	Aug	Sep	Oct	Nov	Dec	Year
Record high °C (°F)	43.0 (109.4)	41.0 (105.8)	40.0 (104.0)	38.2 (100.8)	35.0 (95.0)	34.8 (94.6)	36.2 (97.2)	38.4 (101.1)	40.8 (105.4)	41.8 (107.2)	42.6 (108.7)	41.4 (106.5)	43.0 (109.4)
Mean daily maximum °C (°F)	33.4 (92.1)	33.2 (91.8)	32.2 (90.0)	29.3 (84.7)	26.6 (79.9)	24.3 (75.7)	25.1 (77.2)	26.5 (79.7)	27.8 (82.0)	30.7 (87.3)	32.0 (89.6)	32.6 (90.7)	29.5 (85.1)
Daily mean °C (°F)	27.6 (81.7)	27.3 (81.1)	26.2 (79.2)	23.5 (74.3)	20.3 (68.5)	18.5 (65.3)	18.7 (65.7)	20.0 (68.0)	21.8 (71.2)	24.5 (76.1)	26.0 (78.8)	27.2 (81.0)	23.5 (74.3)
Mean daily minimum °C (°F)	22.7 (72.9)	22.5 (72.5)	21.3 (70.3)	18.5 (65.3)	15.9 (60.6)	13.8 (56.8)	13.3 (55.9)	14.3 (57.7)	16.1 (61.0)	18.6 (65.5)	20.2 (68.4)	21.7 (71.1)	18.2 (64.8)
Record low °C (°F)	12.5 (54.5)	12.0 (53.6)	8.0 (46.4)	5.3 (41.5)	2.5 (36.5)	0.0 (32.0)	−1.5 (29.3)	−3.0 (26.6)	1.8 (35.2)	5.7 (42.3)	10.0 (50.0)	11.4 (52.5)	−3.0 (26.6)
Average precipitation mm (inches)	152.8 (6.02)	122.8 (4.83)	140.1 (5.52)	122.9 (4.84)	124.8 (4.91)	62.3 (2.45)	42.6 (1.68)	55.8 (2.20)	67.7 (2.67)	124.7 (4.91)	161.8 (6.37)	163.5 (6.44)	1,341.8 (52.83)
Average precipitation days (≥ 0.1 mm)	10	9	8	7	7	7	5	6	7	8	8	10	92
Average relative humidity (%)	69	73	74	76	77	77	72	70	68	67	67	70	72
Mean monthly sunshine hours	224	213	217	184	182	152	183	156	173	208	222	222	2,336
Source 1: NOAA (July, November, and December record highs, and March, April, May, August, and October record lows), Meteo Climat (record highs and lows)
Source 2: Deutscher Wetterdienst (sun)

Climate data for Pilar
Month	Jan	Feb	Mar	Apr	May	Jun	Jul	Aug	Sep	Oct	Nov	Dec	Year
Record high °C (°F)	42.4 (108.3)	40.5 (104.9)	39.6 (103.3)	36.5 (97.7)	33.7 (92.7)	31.8 (89.2)	33.2 (91.8)	34.9 (94.8)	38.0 (100.4)	39.6 (103.3)	40.4 (104.7)	41.6 (106.9)	42.4 (108.3)
Mean daily maximum °C (°F)	33.1 (91.6)	32.3 (90.1)	30.6 (87.1)	27.0 (80.6)	24.2 (75.6)	21.5 (70.7)	21.7 (71.1)	23.0 (73.4)	24.9 (76.8)	28.1 (82.6)	29.9 (85.8)	32.2 (90.0)	27.4 (81.3)
Daily mean °C (°F)	27.6 (81.7)	26.9 (80.4)	25.3 (77.5)	22.0 (71.6)	19.2 (66.6)	16.4 (61.5)	16.5 (61.7)	17.5 (63.5)	19.4 (66.9)	22.5 (72.5)	24.7 (76.5)	26.8 (80.2)	22.1 (71.8)
Mean daily minimum °C (°F)	22.4 (72.3)	22.1 (71.8)	20.7 (69.3)	17.4 (63.3)	14.9 (58.8)	12.1 (53.8)	12.0 (53.6)	12.6 (54.7)	14.3 (57.7)	17.2 (63.0)	19.3 (66.7)	21.3 (70.3)	17.2 (63.0)
Record low °C (°F)	14.5 (58.1)	12.1 (53.8)	8.5 (47.3)	7.7 (45.9)	4.0 (39.2)	1.0 (33.8)	0.7 (33.3)	1.0 (33.8)	3.6 (38.5)	7.4 (45.3)	9.8 (49.6)	9.8 (49.6)	0.7 (33.3)
Average precipitation mm (inches)	168.9 (6.65)	141.5 (5.57)	161.0 (6.34)	178.5 (7.03)	95.3 (3.75)	61.8 (2.43)	57.9 (2.28)	47.1 (1.85)	82.9 (3.26)	135.2 (5.32)	157.2 (6.19)	125.7 (4.95)	1,413 (55.63)
Average precipitation days (≥ 0.1 mm)	9	8	9	8	6	6	5	6	7	9	9	8	90
Average relative humidity (%)	69	72	75	78	79	79	76	74	71	69	69	67	73
Source: NOAA

== See also ==
- Geography of Paraguay
- Climate of Argentina
- Climate of Brazil
- Climate of Asunción
