= 2022 heat waves =

Hotter than normal periods in 2022

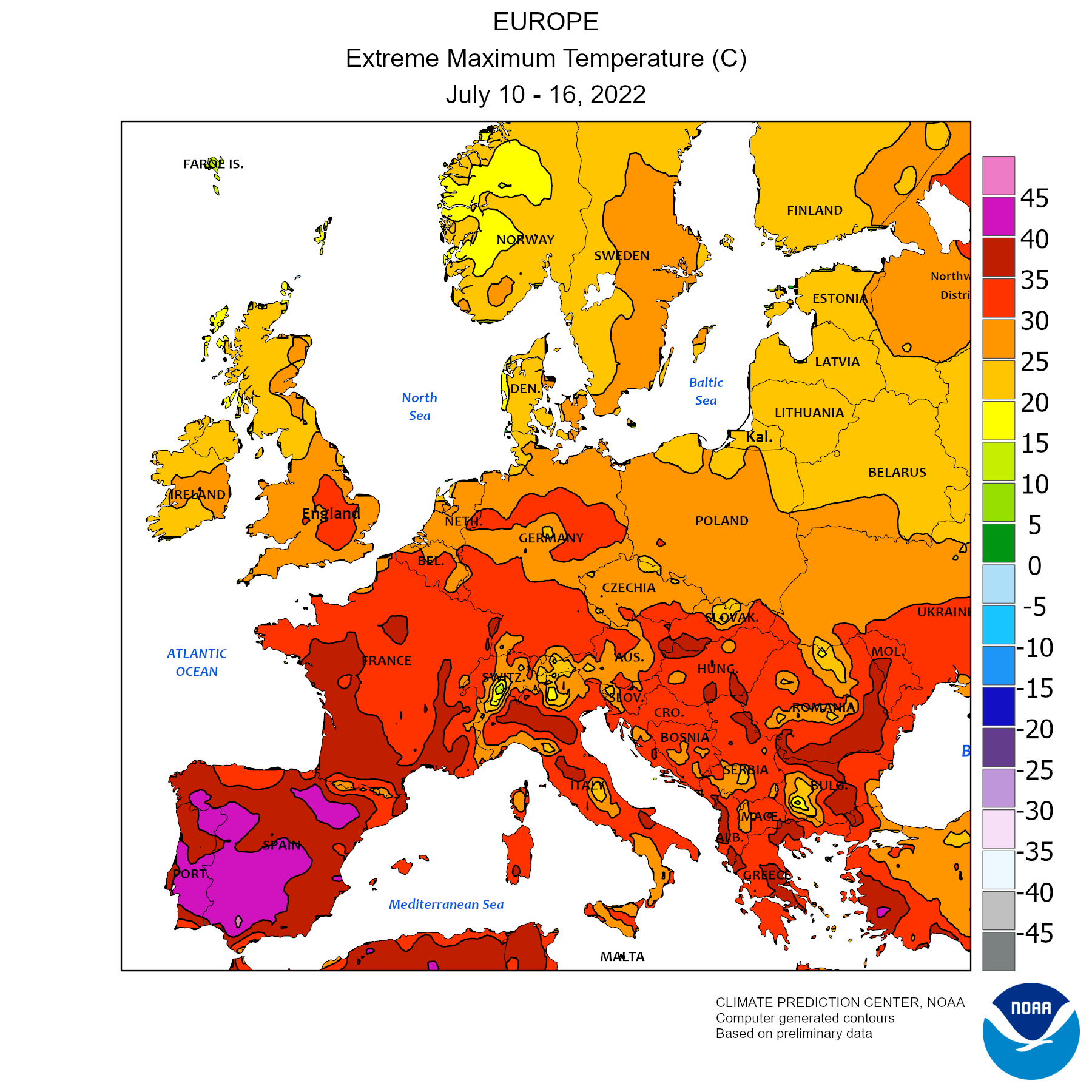
July 2022 European heat wave (week 2)

In 2022, several areas of the world experienced heat waves. Heat waves were especially notable in East Asia, the Indian subcontinent, Australia, western Europe, the United States, and southern South America. 2022 heat waves accounted for record-breaking temperatures and, in some regions, heat-related deaths. Heat waves were worsened by the effects of climate change, and they exacerbated droughts and wildfires.

== Background and effects ==
Due to climate change, heat waves and other extreme weather events are longer and more intense. In many places, heat waves were accompanied by droughts and wildfires.

Heat waves and droughts affected water supplies, rivers (along with shipping and nuclear reactor cooling), ecosystems, various global supply chains, health, and agriculture worldwide.

== By region ==
=== Africa ===
==== Tunisia ====
On 13 July in Tunis, the capital city of Tunisia, the temperature reached 48 °C (118 °F), worsening wildfires in the country.

=== Australia ===
In 14 January in Onslow, Western Australia, the temperature hit 50.7 °C (123.3 °F). If verified, the temperature would be tied as the highest in the Southern Hemisphere. From 18 to 23 January, Perth experienced six consecutive days with temperatures exceeding 40 °C (104 °F). Perth had eleven days of temperatures over 40 °C (104 °F) during the 2021–2022 summer, topping the previous record of seven days recorded in 2016–2017. In early March, a strong heat wave affected Northern Australia, and in particular North Queensland, with Townsville equalling or beating its previous March minimum temperature record five times in one week.

=== Asia ===
==== China ====
During 2022, China suffered several heat waves, starting 5 July. According to the China Meteorological Administration, Turpan was expected to reach 50 °C (122 °F) between 25 and 31 July. China experienced large blackouts and experimented with cloud seeding among other measures, despite experts stating it would be "marginally effective" and possibly exacerbate problems.

==== India and Pakistan ====
Starting in late March, India and Pakistan began experiencing one of the hottest periods on record. At least 90 people were killed by the heat wave; 25 in India and 65 in Pakistan.

==== Japan ====
On 29 June 2022, Japan saw its worst heat wave in 150 years.

=== Europe ===
Heat waves affecting Europe began in June.

Ireland

While June was average in terms of temperatures, the month of July was dry and hot.

A hot spell which began around 10 July saw temperatures reach the high 20s in parts of the south. By 15 July, temperatures were forecast to reach between 33 °C (91.4 °F) and 36 °C (97 °F) in parts of the midlands and the Dublin region on 18 and 19 July.

On 18 July a temperature of 33.1 °C (91.6 °F) was recorded in Phoenix Park, creating the hottest day on record for Dublin.

Heatwaves also occurred in August from 9th to the 14th. Temperatures rose above 30 °C (86 °F) on 11th, 12 and 13 August with a peak temperature of 32.1 °C (89.9 °F) on the 13th in Durrow, Co Laois.

==== Spain ====
The Spanish heat wave began on 12 June. Spain restricted air conditioning to defined temperature ranges.

==== United Kingdom ====
In a heat wave beginning on 8 July, the United Kingdom saw its first ever red extreme heat warning, with a national emergency declared on 15 July. An unconfirmed report from the Met Office on 19 July indicated a new record temperature for the United Kingdom, 40.3 °C (104.5 °F). This is the first time the temperature exceeded 40 °C (104 °F) in the United Kingdom.

=== North America ===
==== United States ====
From 8 to 11 February, multiple cities in central and southern California experienced a record-breaking heat wave. San Francisco recorded 26 °C (78 °F) on 10 February, an all-time record for the city for meteorological winter. Palm Springs recorded 34 °C (93 °F) on 11 February.

A historic heat wave affected the Midwest and Southeast in the second week of June. On 13 June, more than 125 million people under excessive heat warnings. Following a brief respite 18 June, the heat wave returned into the following days.

An intense, fatal heat wave swept through the United States in July. More than 100 million people were under heat alert, and over 85% of the country had temperatures at or above 32 °C (90 °F). This extreme heat severely intensified drought conditions. The heat wave was responsible for at least 19 deaths, including 12 in Maricopa County, Arizona.

Another heat wave moved across the United States in early August, with 80 million Americans under heat alerts.

The US Bureau of Reclamation said in June that those in the Colorado River Basin would have to create plans to reduce water usage. By the August 15 deadline, the mandate was not being followed and the federal government did not have plans to follow up. Also in August, the US federal government announced that Arizona, Nevada, and Mexico would have to reduce water usage, per a previously negotiated agreement. These cuts were much less than those prescribed by the Bureau of Reclamation.

A record-breaking heat wave broke numerous records across the Eastern United States from November 5–7. Several places set monthly high temperature records on November 7, including Bridgeport, Connecticut and Washington DC.

=== South America ===
==== Southern Cone ====
From 10 to 16 January, the Southern Cone had a severe heat wave. Argentina, Uruguay, Paraguay, and certain parts of Brazil experienced extreme temperatures, with Argentina suffering the worst impacts. According to the World Meteorological Organization, it affected water, energy supply, and agriculture. Buenos Aires reached 41.5 °C (106.7 °F) and more than 700,000 people lost power. Parts of Argentina reached 45 °C (113 °F).

== See also ==
- Weather of 2022
- 2021 heat waves
