= Climate of Colombia =

Colombia map of Köppen climate classification.

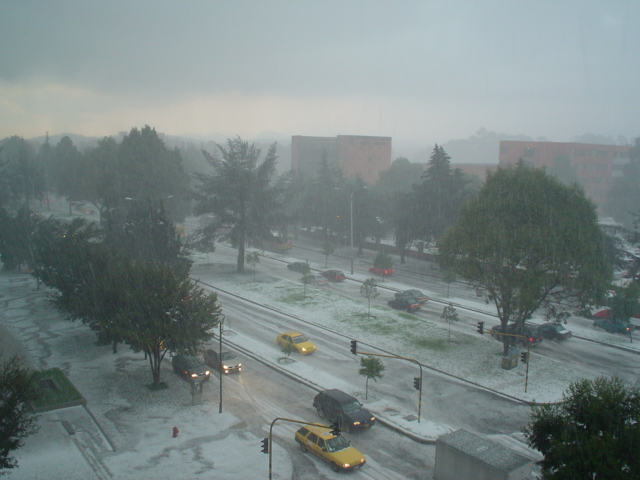
An uncommon hailstorm in Bogotá on March 3, 2006, product of a combination of altitude (low temperature at an altitude of 2640 meters above sea level) and precipitation.

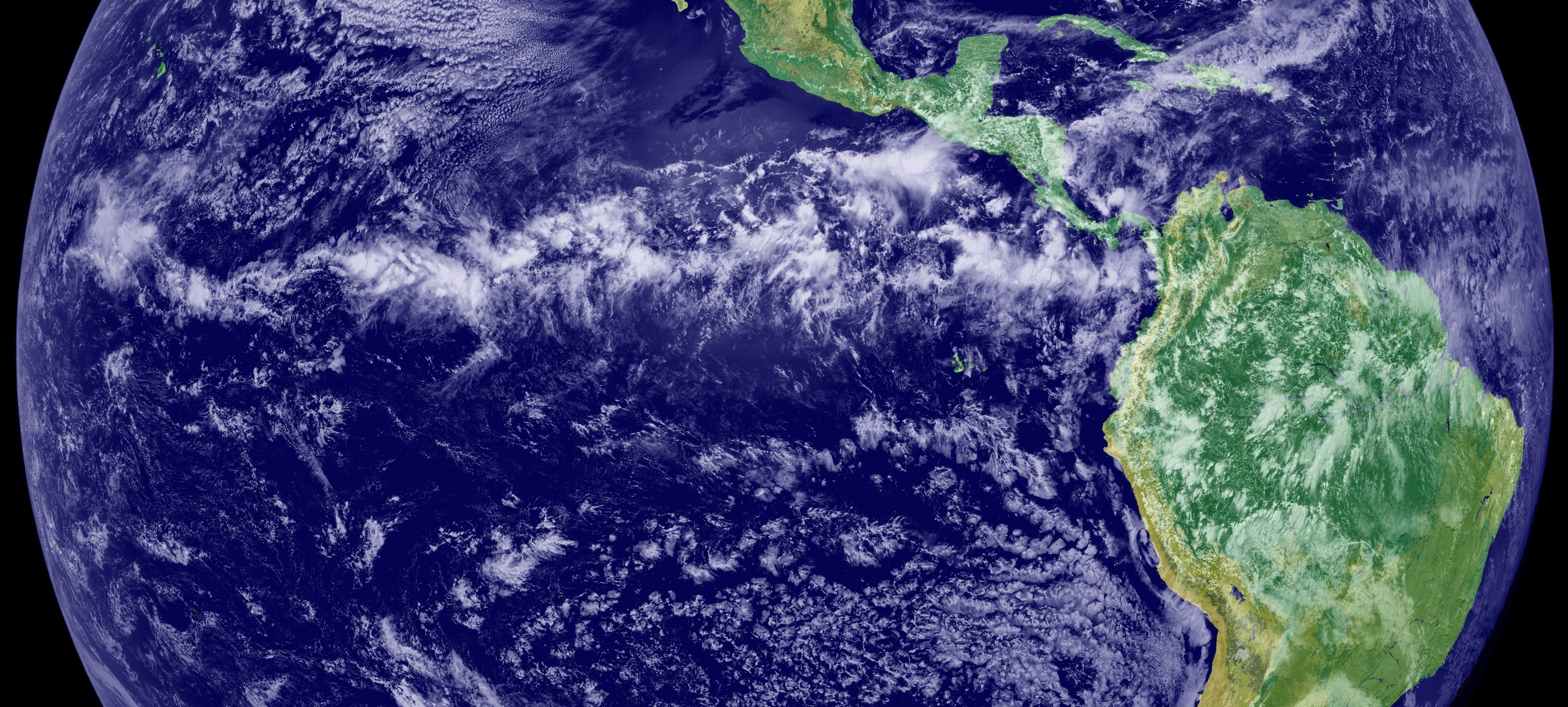
The thunderstorms of the Intertropical Convergence Zone form a line across the eastern Pacific Ocean and over Colombia.

The climate of Colombia is characterized for being tropical and isothermal as a result of its geographical location near the Equator presenting variations within five natural regions and depending on the altitude, temperature, humidity, winds and rainfall. Each region maintains an average temperature throughout the year only presenting variables determined by precipitation during a rainy season caused by the Intertropical Convergence Zone.

== Climate zones ==
The climates in Colombia are characterized for having tropical rainforests, savannas, steppes, deserts and mountain climate, mountain climate further divided into tierra caliente (hot land) tierra templada (temperate land) tierra fría (cold land), tierra helada (frozen land) and Páramo. Sometimes the weather of Colombia is altered by the seasons in northern hemisphere, for example, from March to June, the weather is mild Spring, from June to August the weather is hot Summer, From September to December the weather is cool Autumn, and from December to March the weather is cold Winter. This happens very rarely, and it is usually a slight difference.

=== Tropical rainforest ===
The tropical rainforest climate is characterized by hot and high humidity climate along with heavy rainfall mostly present in the jungles of the Catatumbo, the Amazon river basin the central region of the Magdalena River, the Pacific coast, the paru and others.

=== Tropical desert ===
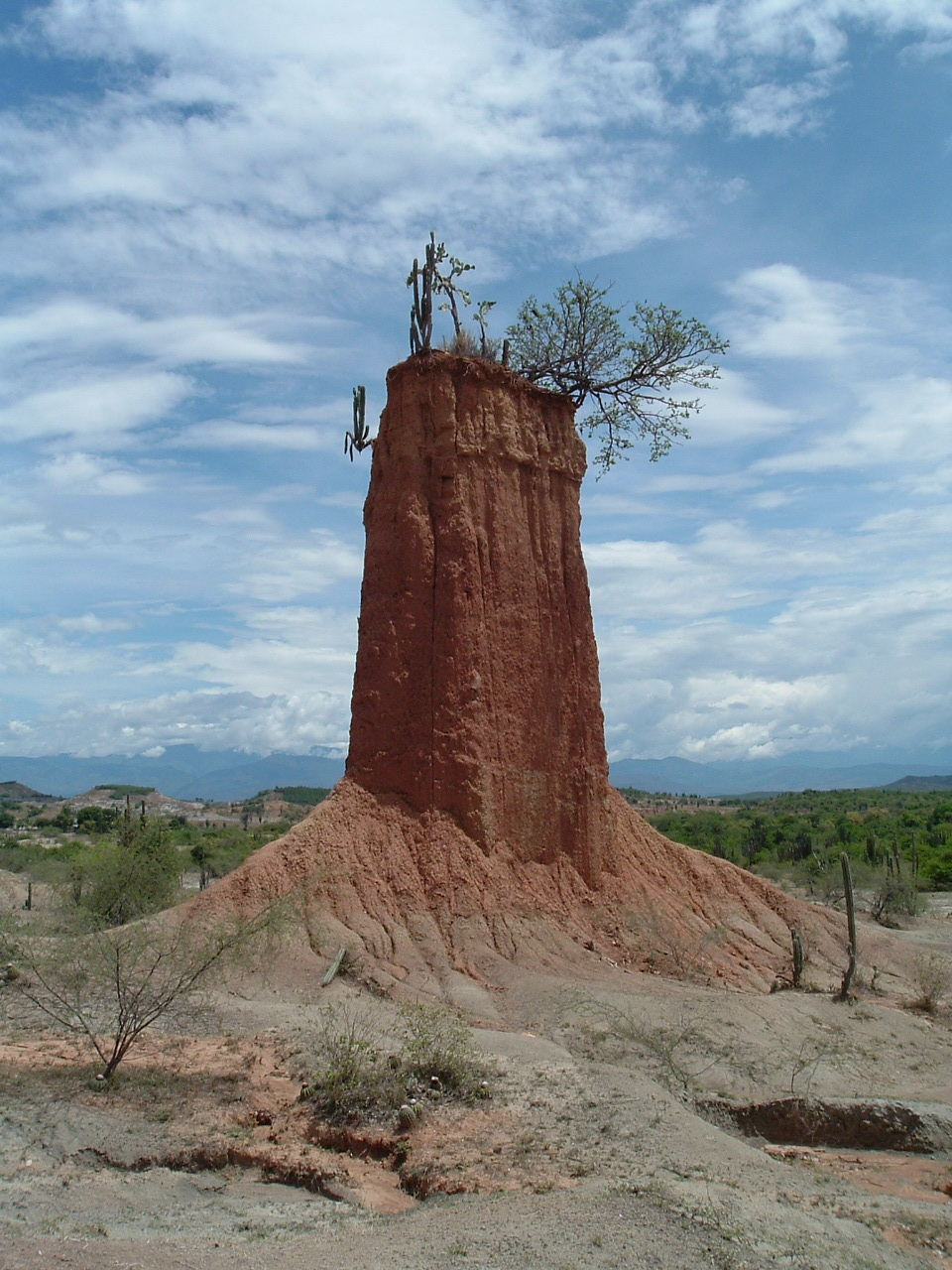
The Tatacoa Desert.

=== Tropical mountain climate ===
Mountain climate is one of the unique features of the Andes, the Sierra Nevada de Santa Marta and other high altitude reliefs where climate is determined by elevation. (Spanish: Pisos termicos), a classification used in some countries but with variations in the classification of each floor.

Warm climate altitudinal zone

The warm altitudinal zone oscillates between sea level and 1,000 meters (3,281 ft) above sea level with a temperature over 24 °C (75.2 °F). Climate in this step is characterized for its similarities with the equatorial and tropical plains, heavy rains and high temperatures. Temperatures can reach over 37.8 °C (100.0 °F) as it is the case of the Magdalena river valley, which has many areas with jungles. This altitudinal zone is present in the cities like Santa Marta, Neiva, Cali, and Cúcuta.

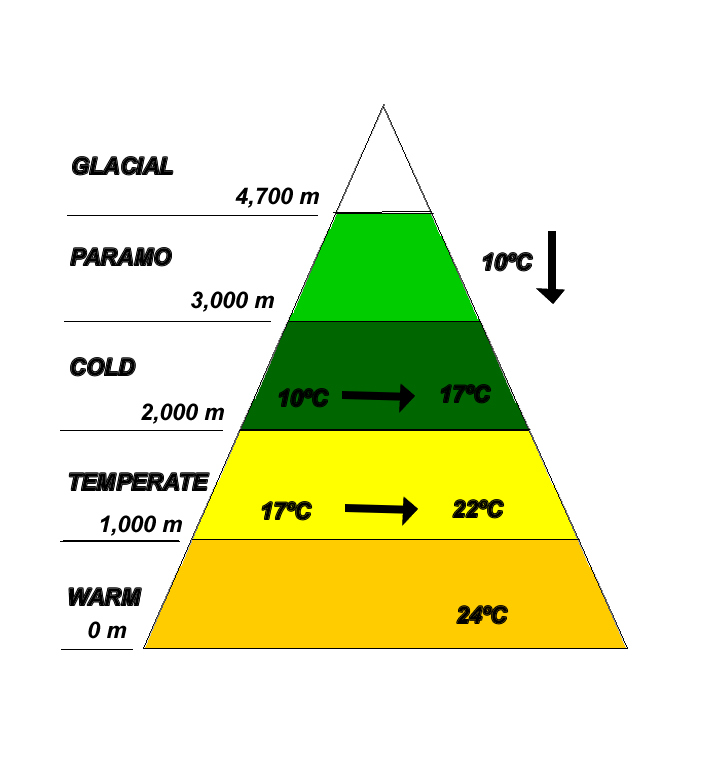
Representation of the altitudinal zones present in the Andean mountains.

Temperate climate altitudinal zone

Between 1,000 and 2,000 meters (3,281 and 6,562 ft) above sea level the temperature drops oscillating between 17 and 22 °C (62.6 and 71.6 °F) defining it as a temperate climate. Rainfall becomes variable at 1,700 meters (5,577 ft) above sea level and rains between 2,000 and 2,500 mm (78.7 and 98.4 in). This climate is a characteristic in the cities like Pereira, Armenia, Ibagué, Popayán, and Medellín.

Cold climate altitudinal zone

The cold climate is present between 2,000 and 3,000 meters (6,562 and 9,843 ft) above sea level and is characterized for having Andean or cloud forests. This altitudinal zone is characterized for presenting an average temperature ranging between 10 and 17 °C (50.0 and 62.6 °F) while rainfall reaches a yearly average of 2,000 mm (78.7 in). The Colombian capital city Bogotá is located in this altitudinal zone. Other cities, like San Juan de Pasto and Tunja, are in this location.

Páramo climate altitudinal zone

The Páramo climate is present between 3,000 and 4,000 meters (9,843 and 13,123 ft) above sea level and the temperature is lower than 10 °C (50 °F) with icy winds, rare rainfall but frequent snowfall. Colombia has one of the largest páramo areas in the world; the Sumapaz Páramo located in central Colombia, over the Andean Cordillera Oriental branch. In Colombia, páramos are further classified as subpáramo, páramo and superpáramo. Most of the rivers in Colombia are born here since páramos tend to hold water from precipitations and deglaciations coming from the peaks.

Glacial climate altitudinal zone

The glaciers in Colombia are located at 4,000 meters (13,123 ft) above sea level and up and with average temperatures ranging between 10 °C (50 °F) and less. Glaciers in Colombia began retreating in the 20th century due to global warming and are in danger of disappearing, if this occurs water supply would be scarce in the near future. Most of the glaciers are located in the Andes mountains and are inhabited by very few living species due to its severe weather.

Climate of Colombia

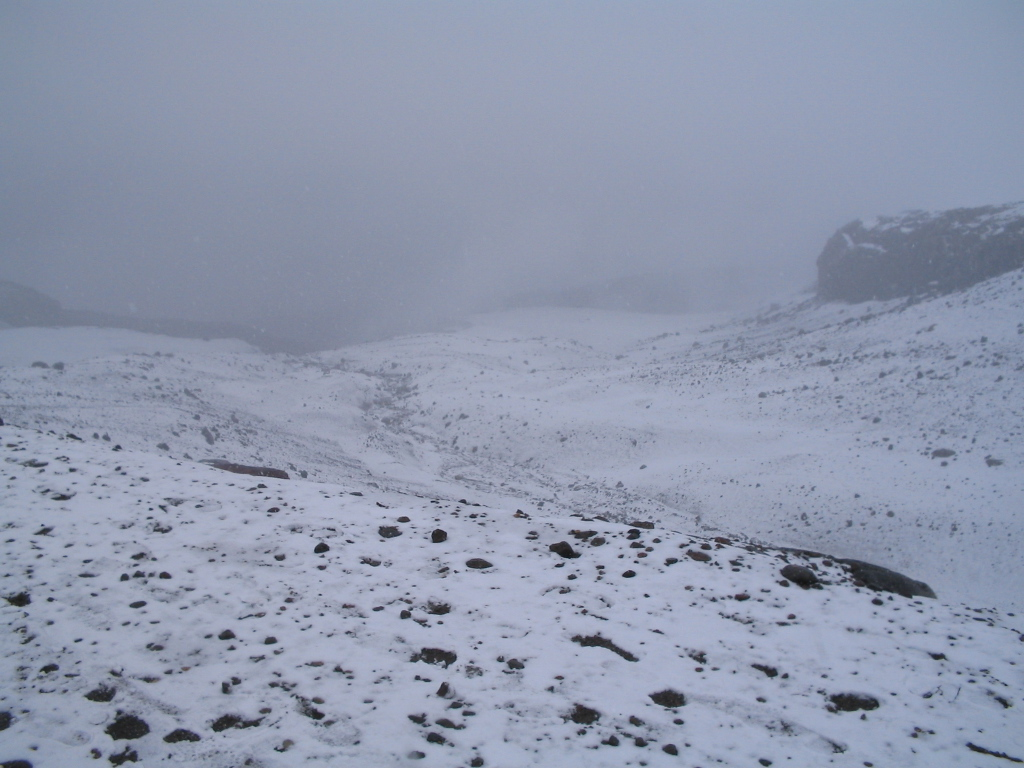
Ice cap climate in the Nevado del Ruiz

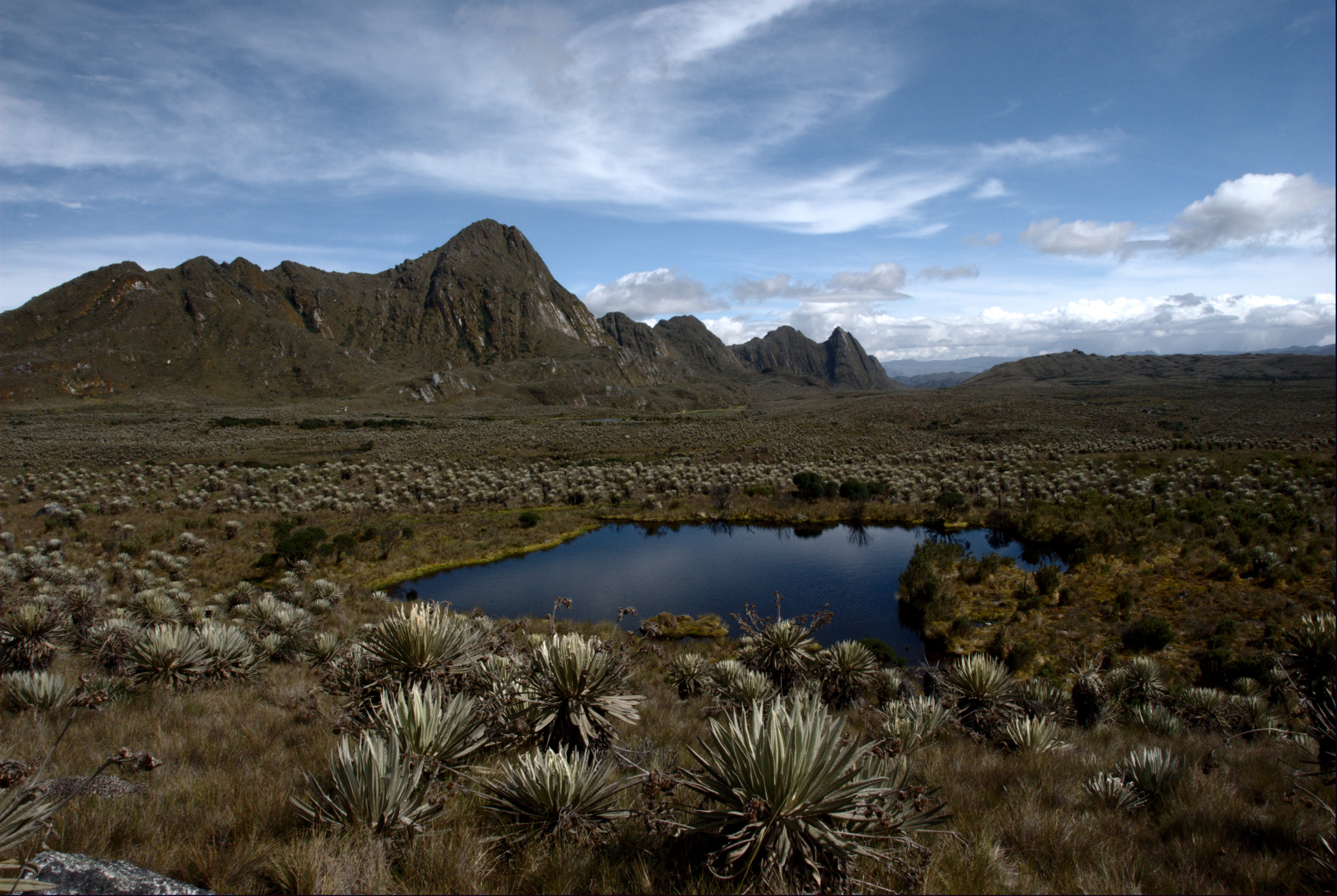
Alpine tundra climate in the Sumapaz Paramo

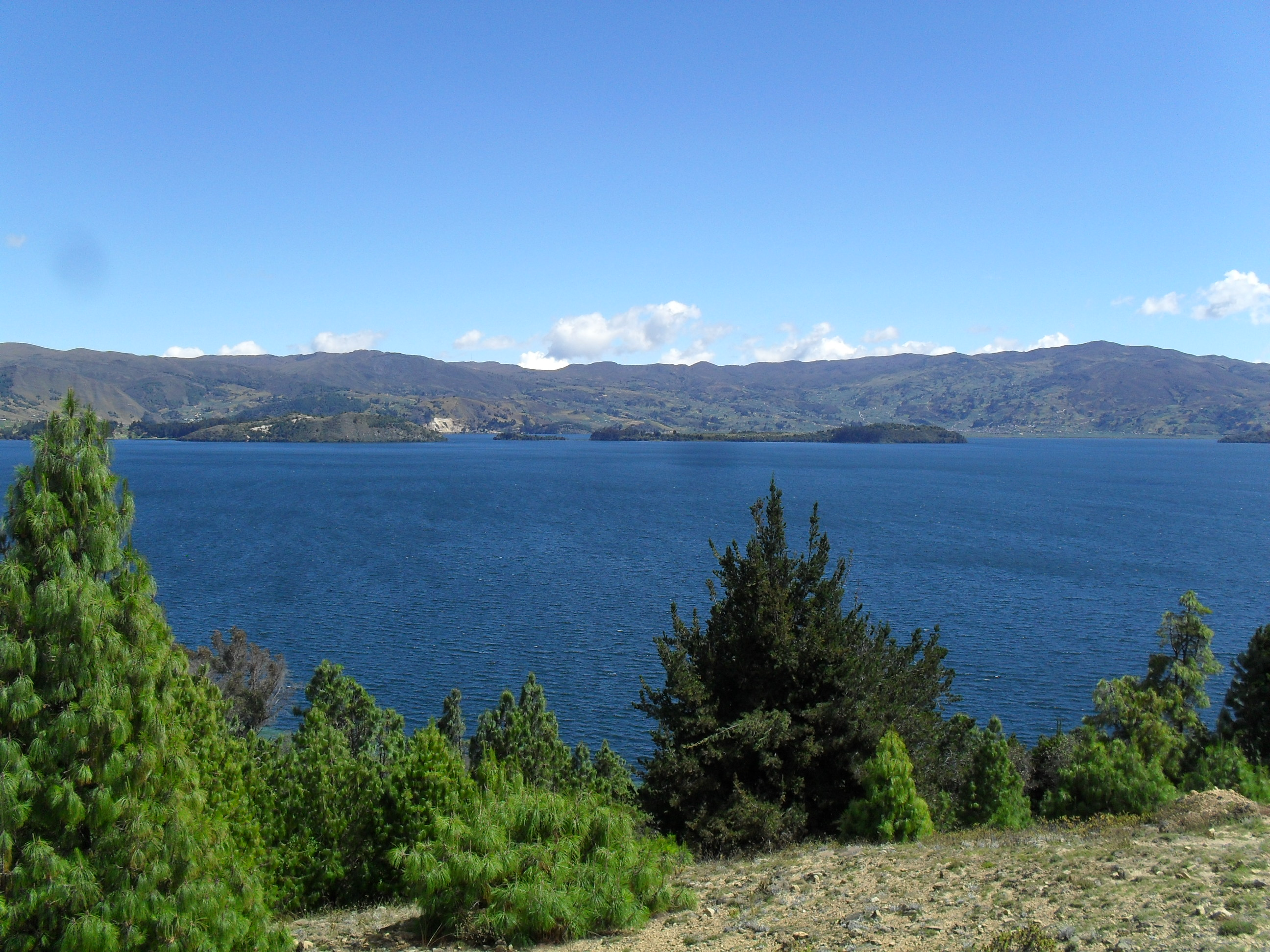
Oceanic climate in Tota Lake

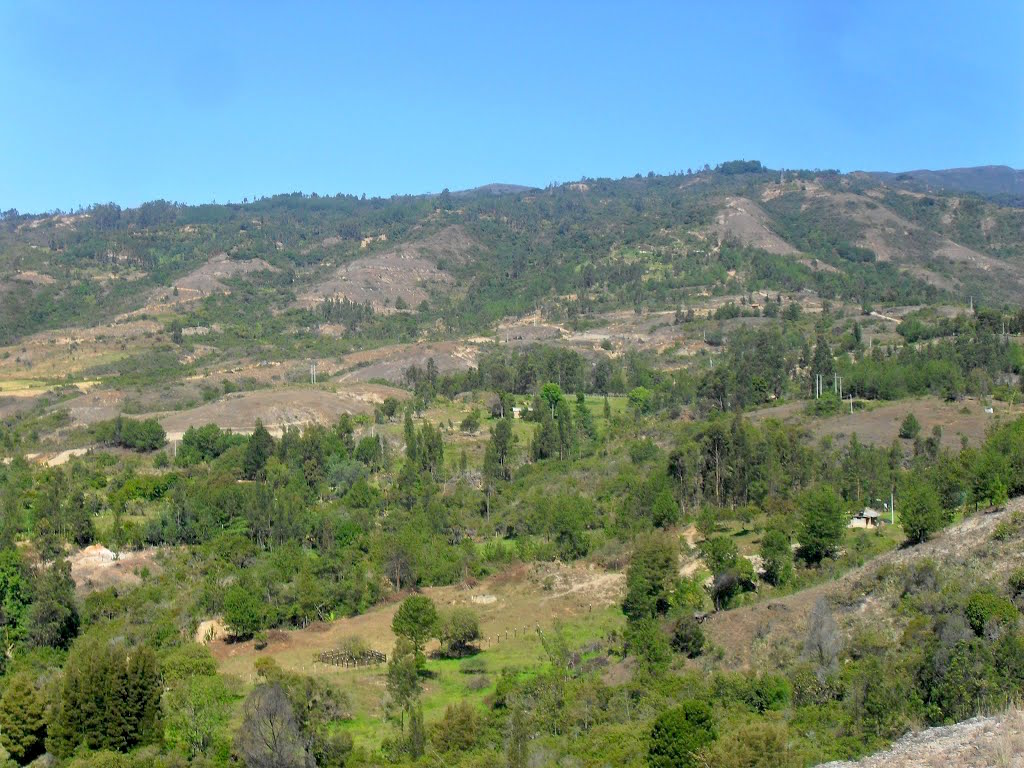
Mediterranean climate in Boyacá Department

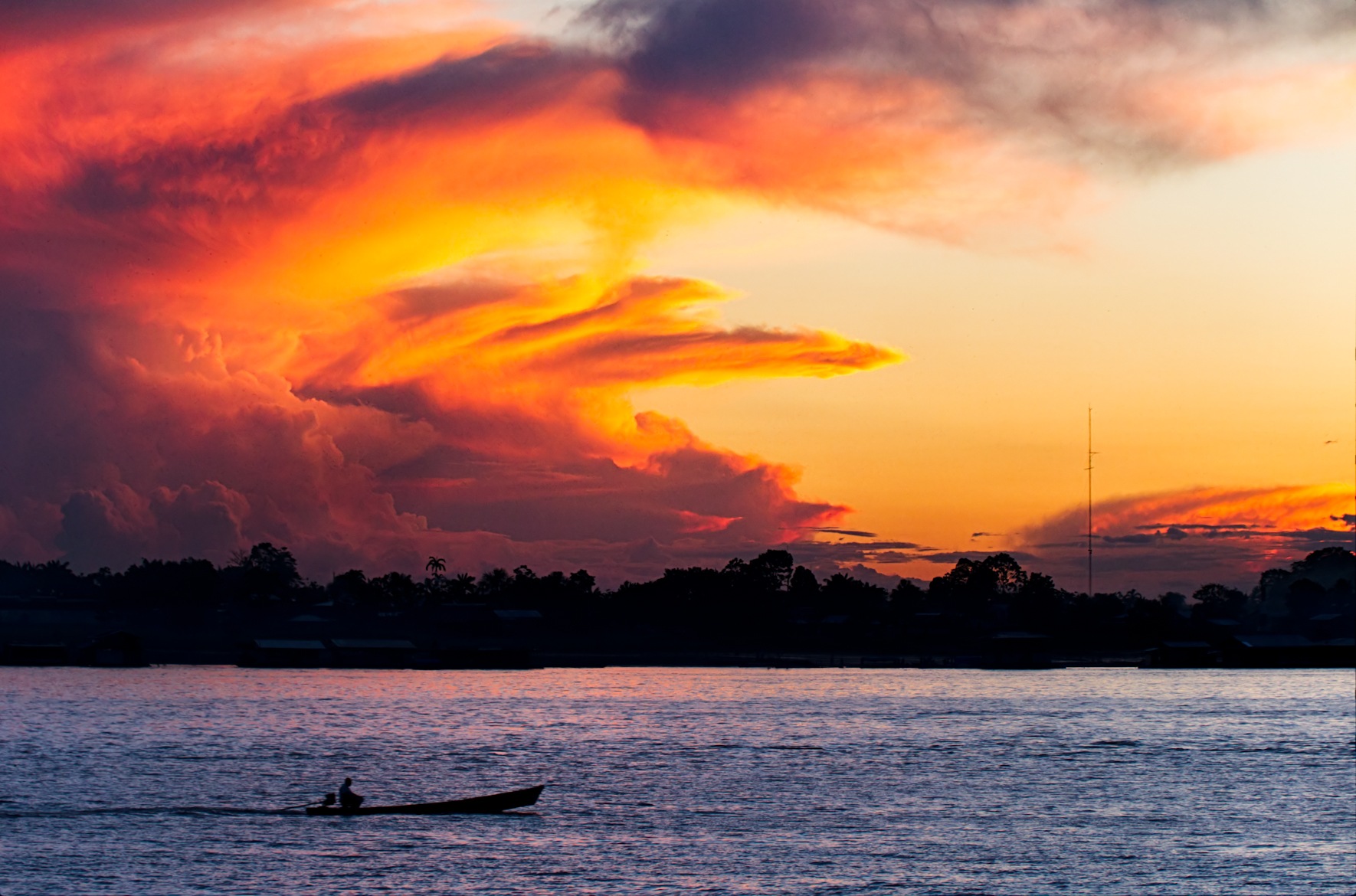
Tropical rainforest climate in the Amazon Rainforest

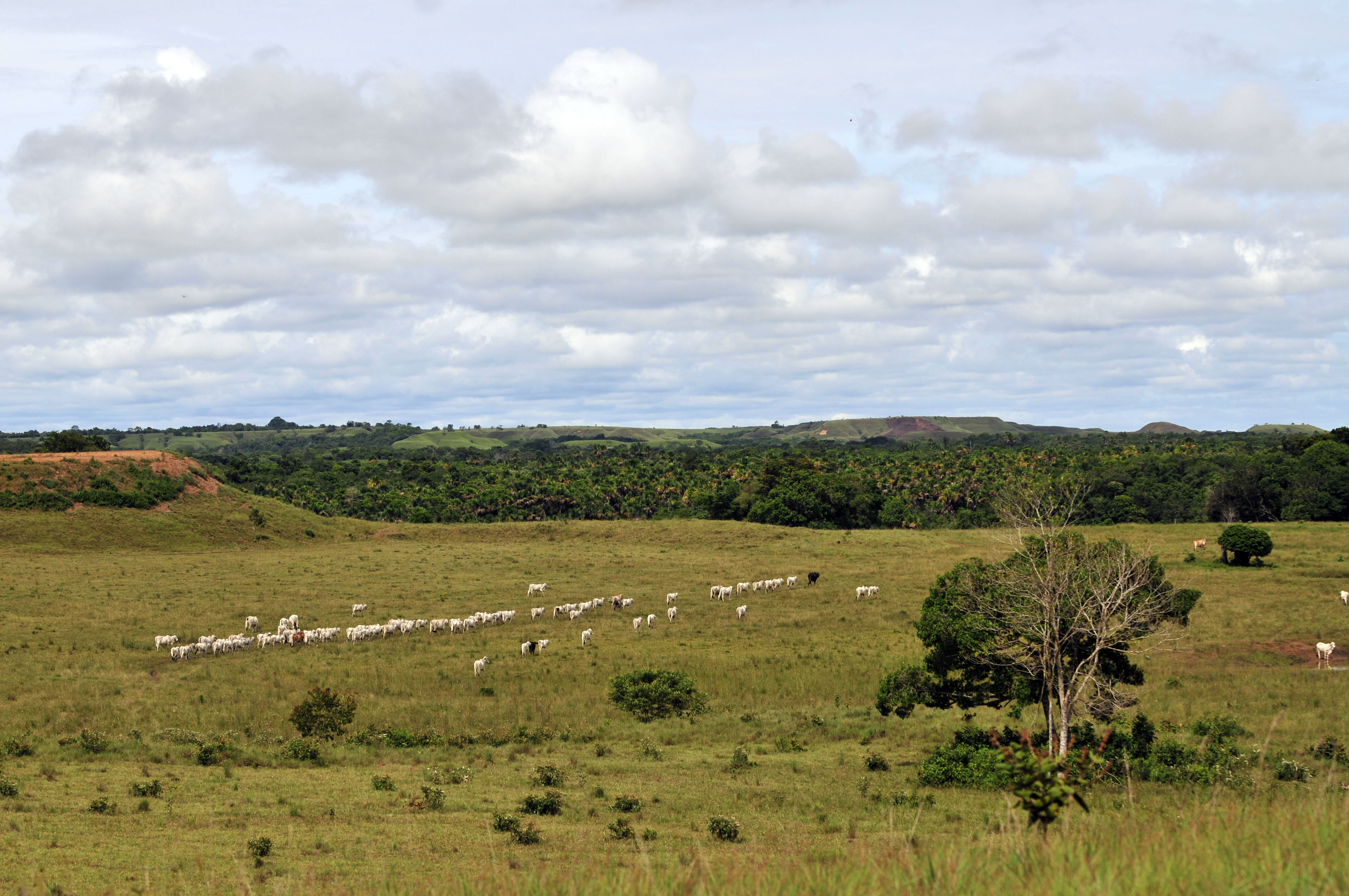
Tropical savanna climate in Los Llanos

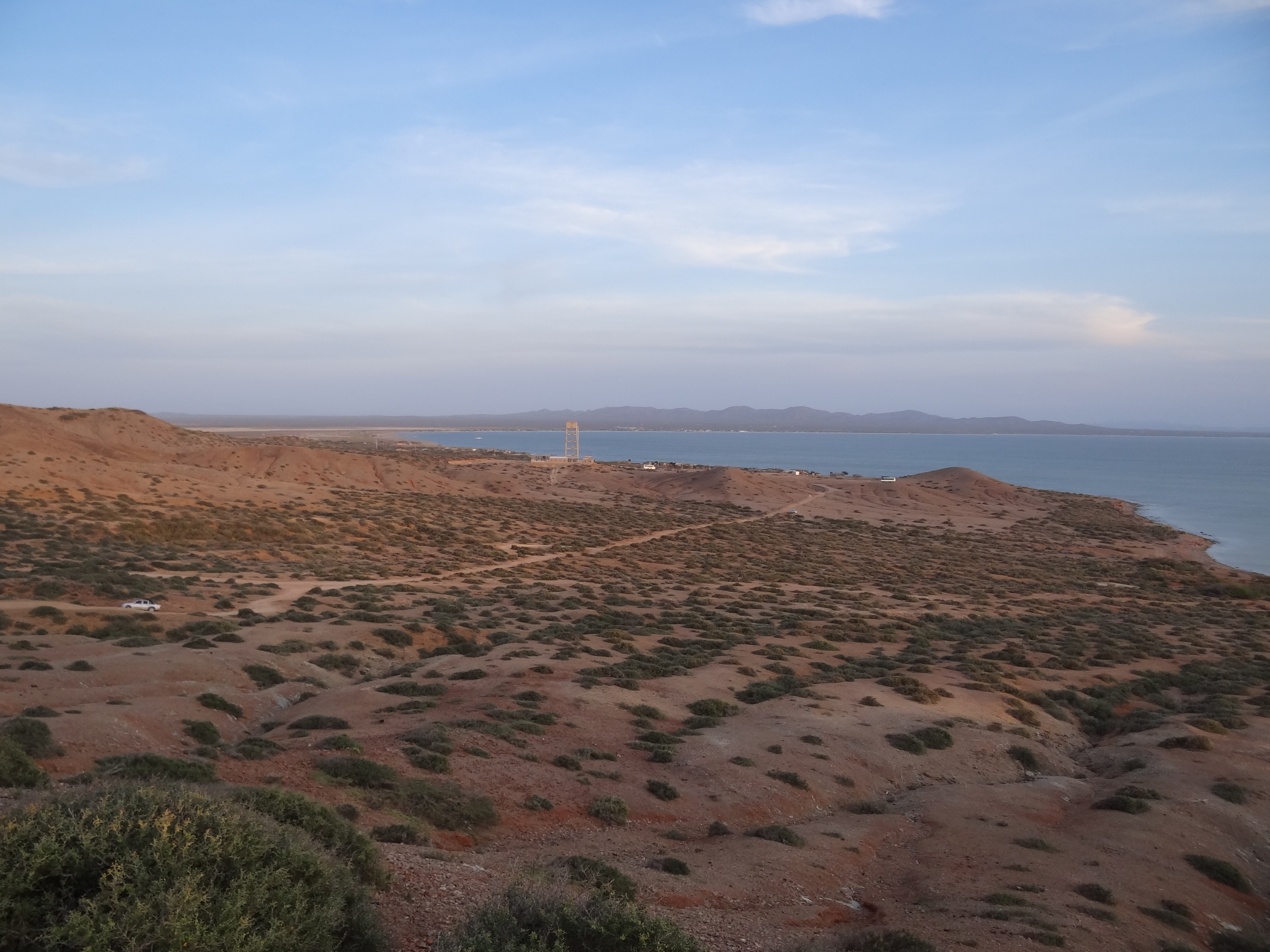
Hot desert climate in the Guajira Peninsula

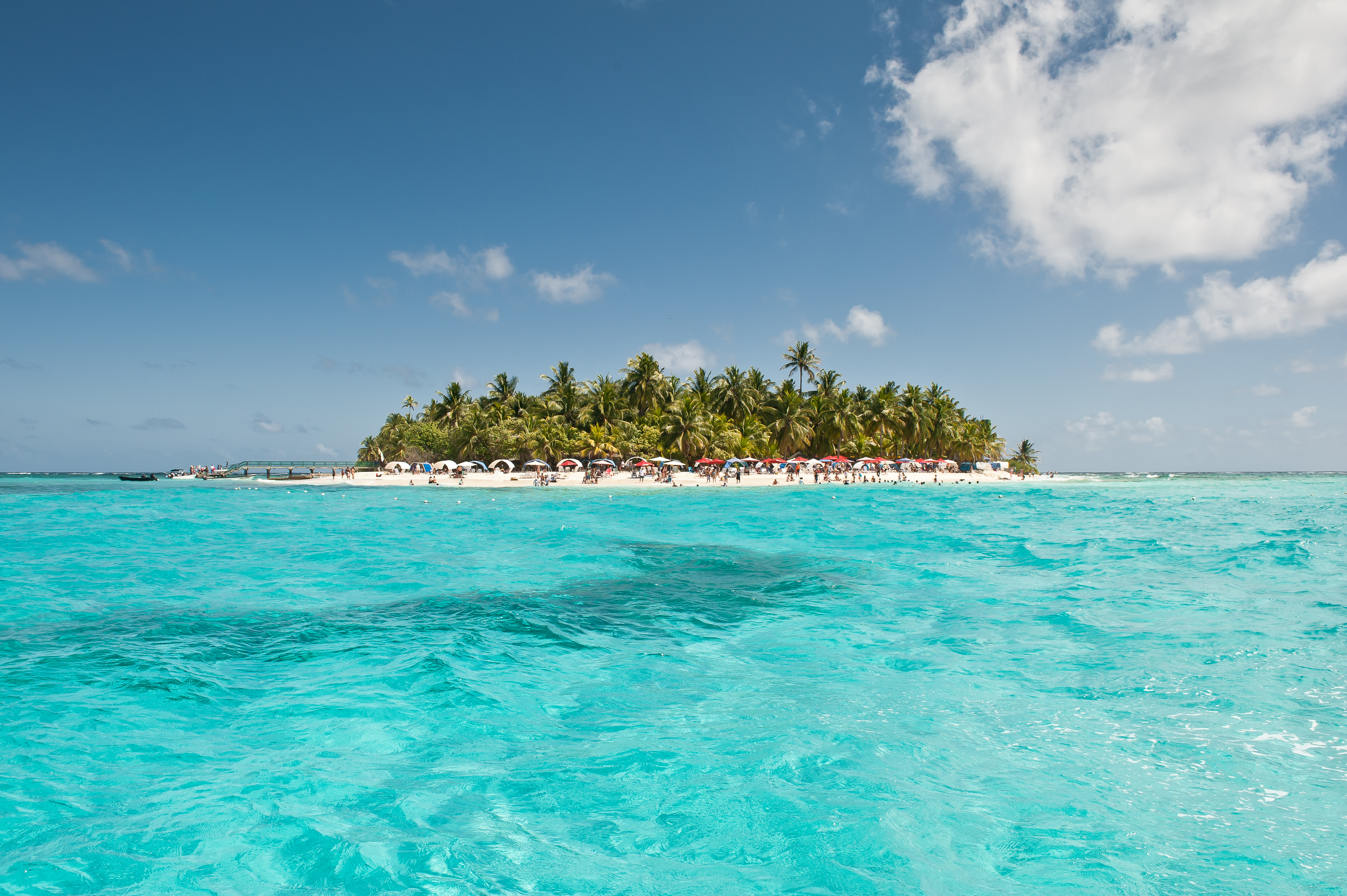
Tropical wet and dry climate in San Andrés y Providencia

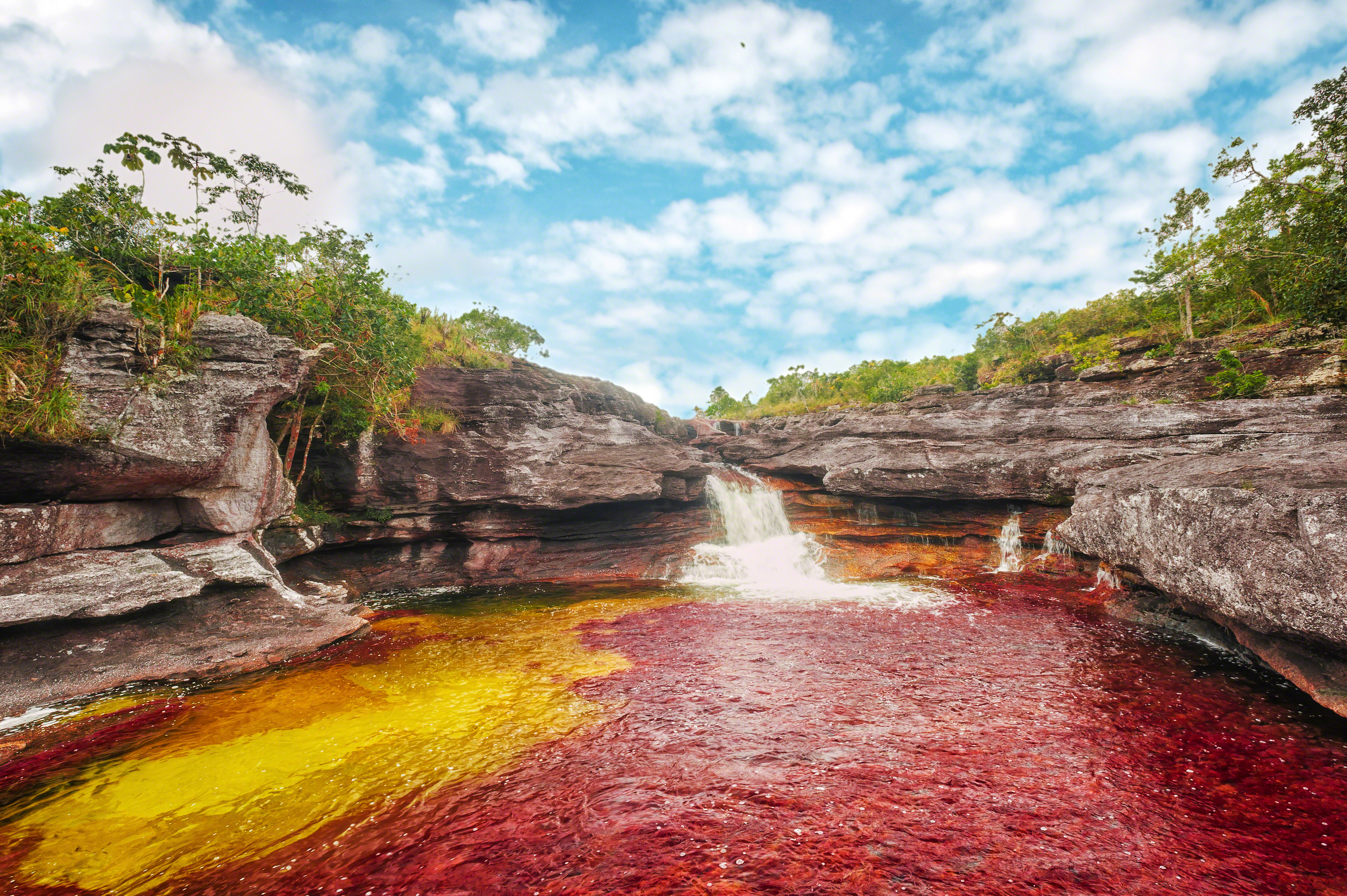
Warm and wet climate in Caño Cristales

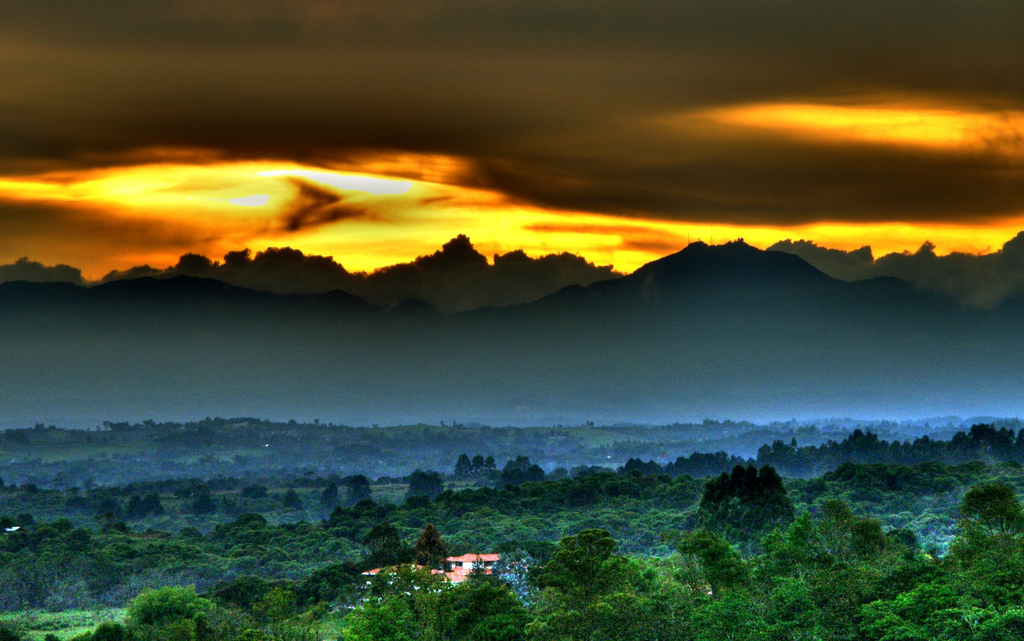
Mountain climate in the Cordillera Occidental

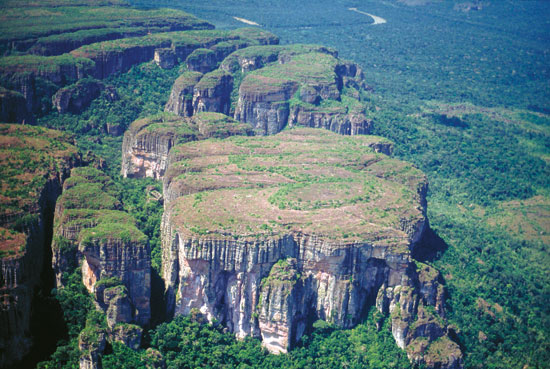
Tropical wet climate in the tepuys of the Serranía de Chiribiquete
