= Andean natural region =

Mountainous region in central Colombia

Andean region

Ecology
- Realm: Neotropic
- Biome: Dry Forest, Rainforest, Mountain Forest, Páramo

Geography
- Country: Colombia
- Coordinates: 5°01′25″N 74°37′54″W
- Rivers: Magdalena, Cauca
- Climate type: Tropical, Subtropical, Temperate

The Andean region, located in central Colombia, is the most populated natural region of Colombia. With many mountains, the Andes contain most of the country's urban centers. They were also the location of the most significant pre-Columbian indigenous settlements as well as the region with the most European influence due to immigration from the colony to the present day. Beyond the Colombian Massif in the south-western departments of Cauca and Nariño, the Colombian Andes divide into three branches known as "cordilleras" (from the Spanish for mountain range): the West Andes run adjacent to the Pacific coast and is home to the city of Cali. The Central Andes run up the center of the country between the Cauca and Magdalena river valleys (to the west and east respectively) and includes the cities of Medellín, Manizales and Pereira. The East Andes extend northeast towards the Guajira Peninsula, and includes the cities of Bogotá, Bucaramanga and Cúcuta.

The climate and vegetation of the region vary considerably according to altitude, but as a general rule the land can be divided into the tierra caliente (hot land) of river valleys and basins below 1,000 m; the more temperate conditions of the tierra templada (temperate land, approximately 1,000 m to 2,000 m) and tierra fría (cold land, 2,000 m to 3,200 m), which include the most productive land and most of the population; and the alpine conditions of the zona forestada (forested zone, 3,200 m to 3,900 m), páramos (3,900 m to 4,600 m) and tierra helada (frozen land, 4,600 m and above).

== Biogeographical subregions ==
- Pasto Massif
- Colombian Massif
- West Andes
- Central Andes
- East Andes
- Cauca River Valley
- Magdalena River Valley

== Protected areas ==
West Andes from south to north: Munchique, Farallones de Cali, Tatamá, Las Orquideas, Paramillo

== See also ==
- Valleys and Plateaus of Colombia
- West Andes
- Central Andes
- East Andes
- Paisa Region
- List of mountains in Colombia
