= Altiplano =

Large plateau in west-central South America

- Plateau
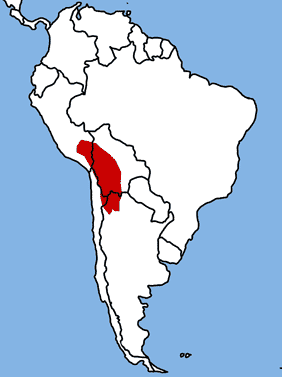
- Location in South America
- Coordinates: 19°S 68°W
- Realm: Neotropics
- Countries: Bolivia, Peru, Chile, Argentina
- Largest city: El Alto, Bolivia
- Elevation: 3,800 m (12,500 ft)

Population (2012)
  - Total: 2,850,000

The Altiplano (Spanish for "high plain"), Collao (Quechua and Aymara: Qullaw, meaning "place of the Qulla") or Andean Plateau is a plateau in west-central South America. Located at the latitude of the widest part of the north–south-trending Andes, it is the most extensive high plateau on Earth outside Tibet. The bulk of the Altiplano lies in Bolivia, but its northern parts lie in Peru, its southwestern fringes lie in Chile, and it extends into Argentina.

Many towns and several cities are on the plateau, including El Alto and Oruro in Bolivia and Juliaca and Puno in Peru. The northeastern part of the Altiplano is more humid than the southwestern part, which has several salares (salt flats), due to its aridity. At the Bolivia–Peru border lies Lake Titicaca, the largest lake in South America. Farther south, in Bolivia, Lake Poopó existed until recently, but by December 2015, it had completely dried up, and was declared defunct. Whether that lake, which had been the second-largest in Bolivia, can be restored is unclear.

The Altiplano was the site of several pre-Columbian cultures, including the Chiripa, Tiwanaku, and the Inca Empire. Spain conquered the region in the 16th century.

Today, major economic activities in the Altiplano include mining, llama and vicuña herding, and services (in its cities). The area also attracts some international tourism.

== Geography ==
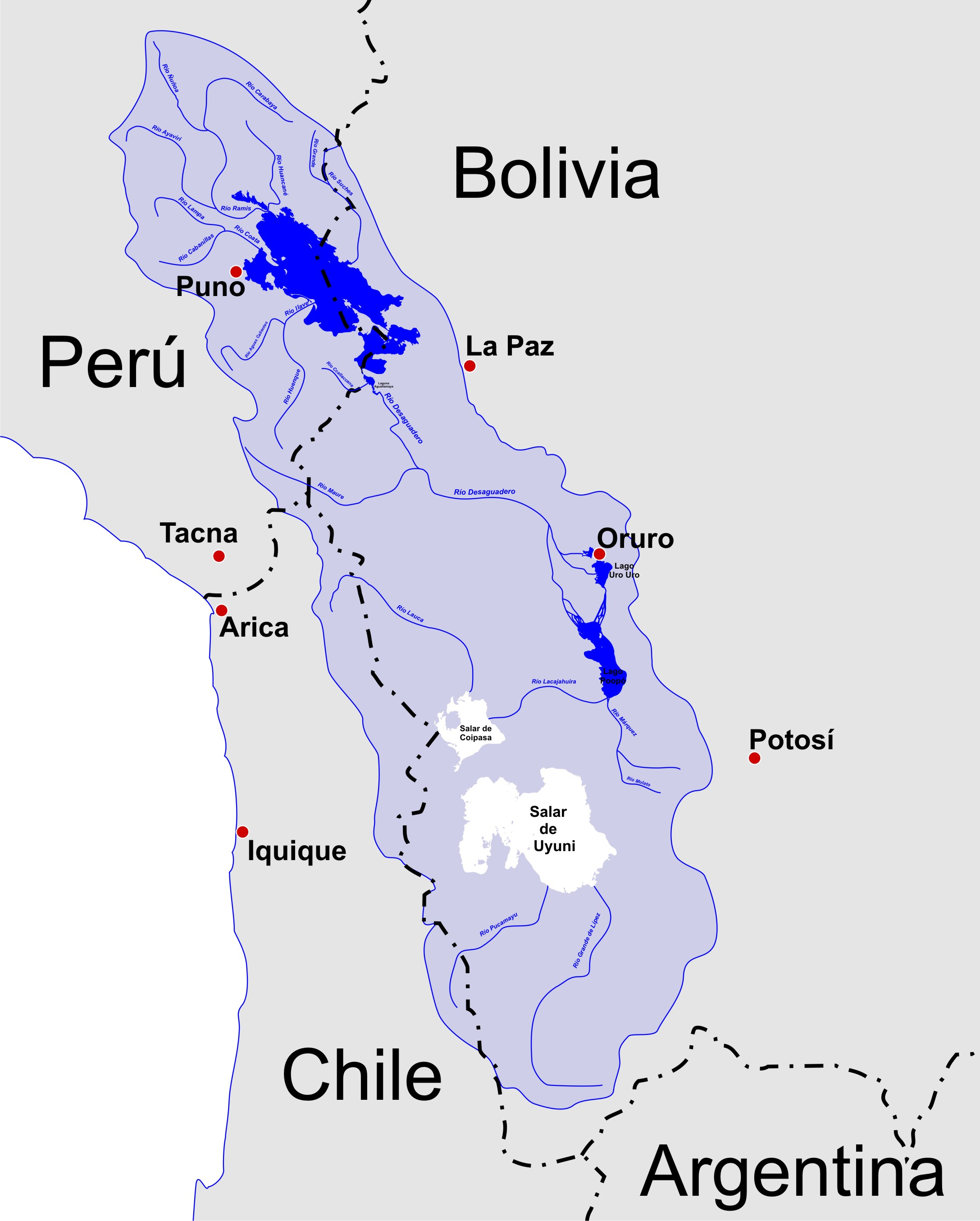
A map of the endorheic river basins that characterize the altiplano. In the north is Lake Titicaca and the Desaguadero River system; in the south is the Salar de Uyuni salt flat. The non-endorheic altiplano extends southward into Argentina and Chile.

The Altiplano is an area of inland drainage (endorheism) lying in the central Andes, occupying parts of northern Chile, western Bolivia, southern Peru, and northwest Argentina. Its elevation averages about 3,750 meters (12,300 feet), slightly less than that of the Tibetan Plateau. Unlike conditions in Tibet, the Altiplano is dominated by massive active volcanoes of the Central Volcanic Zone to the west, such as Ampato (6288 m), Tutupaca (5,816 m), Parinacota (6348 m), Guallatiri (6071 m), Paruma (5,728 m), Uturunku (6,008 m), and Licancabur (5,916 m), and the Cordillera Real in the northeast with Illampu (6,368 m), Huayna Potosí (6,088 m), Janq'u Uma (6,427 m) and Illimani (6,438 m). The Atacama Desert, one of the driest areas on the planet, lies to the southwest of the Altiplano; to the east lies the humid Amazon rainforest.

The Altiplano is noted for hypoxic air caused by very high elevation. The communities located in the Altiplano include Qulla, Uros, Quechua, and Aymara.

== Geology ==
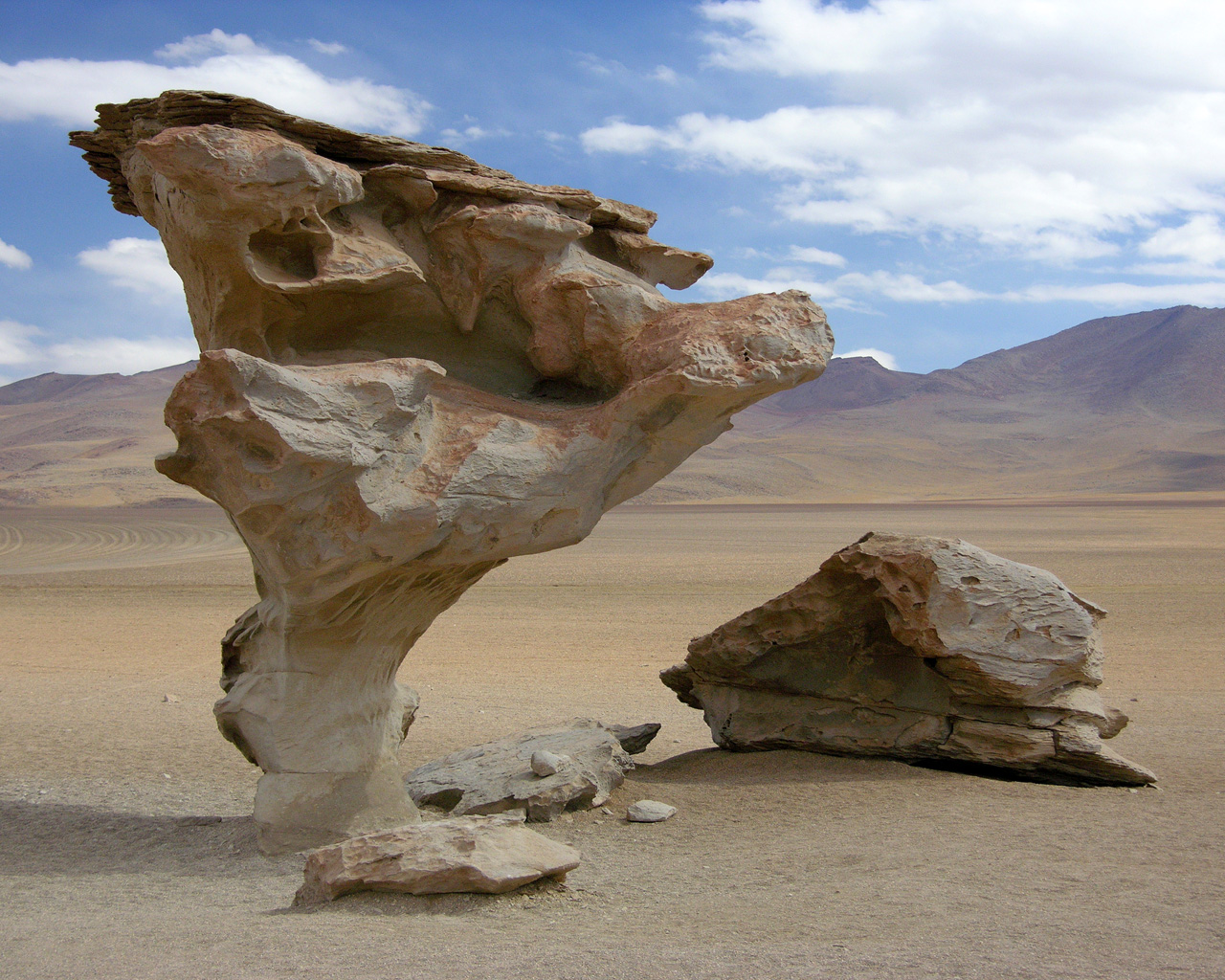
A rock sculpted by wind erosion (or Aeolian processes) in the Bolivian Altiplano

Several mechanisms have been put forth for the formation of the Altiplano plateau; hypotheses try to explain why the topography in the Andes incorporates this large area of low relief at high altitude (high plateau) within the orogen:

1. Existence of weaknesses in the Earth's crust prior to tectonic shortening: Such weaknesses would cause the partition of tectonic deformation and uplift into the eastern and western cordillera, leaving the necessary space for the formation of the altiplano basin.
2. Magmatic processes rooted in the asthenosphere might have contributed to uplift of the plateau.
3. Climate has controlled the spatial distribution of erosion and sediment deposition, controlling the lubrication along the subducting Nazca Plate, hence influencing the transmission of tectonic forces into South America.
4. Climate also determined the formation of internal drainage (endorheism) and sediment trapping within the Andes, potentially blocking tectonic deformation in the central area between the two cordilleras, and expelling deformation towards the flanks of the orogen.
5. Convective removal of the dense lower lithosphere beneath the Altiplano caused that region to isostatically "float" higher.

At various times during the Pleistocene epoch, both the southern and northern Altiplano areas were covered by vast pluvial lakes. Remnants are Lake Titicaca, straddling the Peru–Bolivia border, and Poopó, a salt lake that extends south of Oruro, Bolivia. Salar de Uyuni, locally known as Salar de Tunupa, and Salar de Coipasa are two large, dry, salt flats formed after the Altiplano paleolakes dried out.

== Climate ==
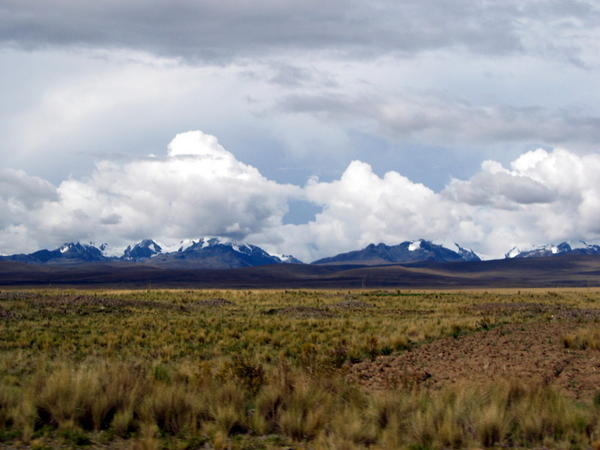
The Bolivian Altiplano at about 4,250 m (14,000 feet): The snow-covered peaks of the Cordillera Real rise in the background.

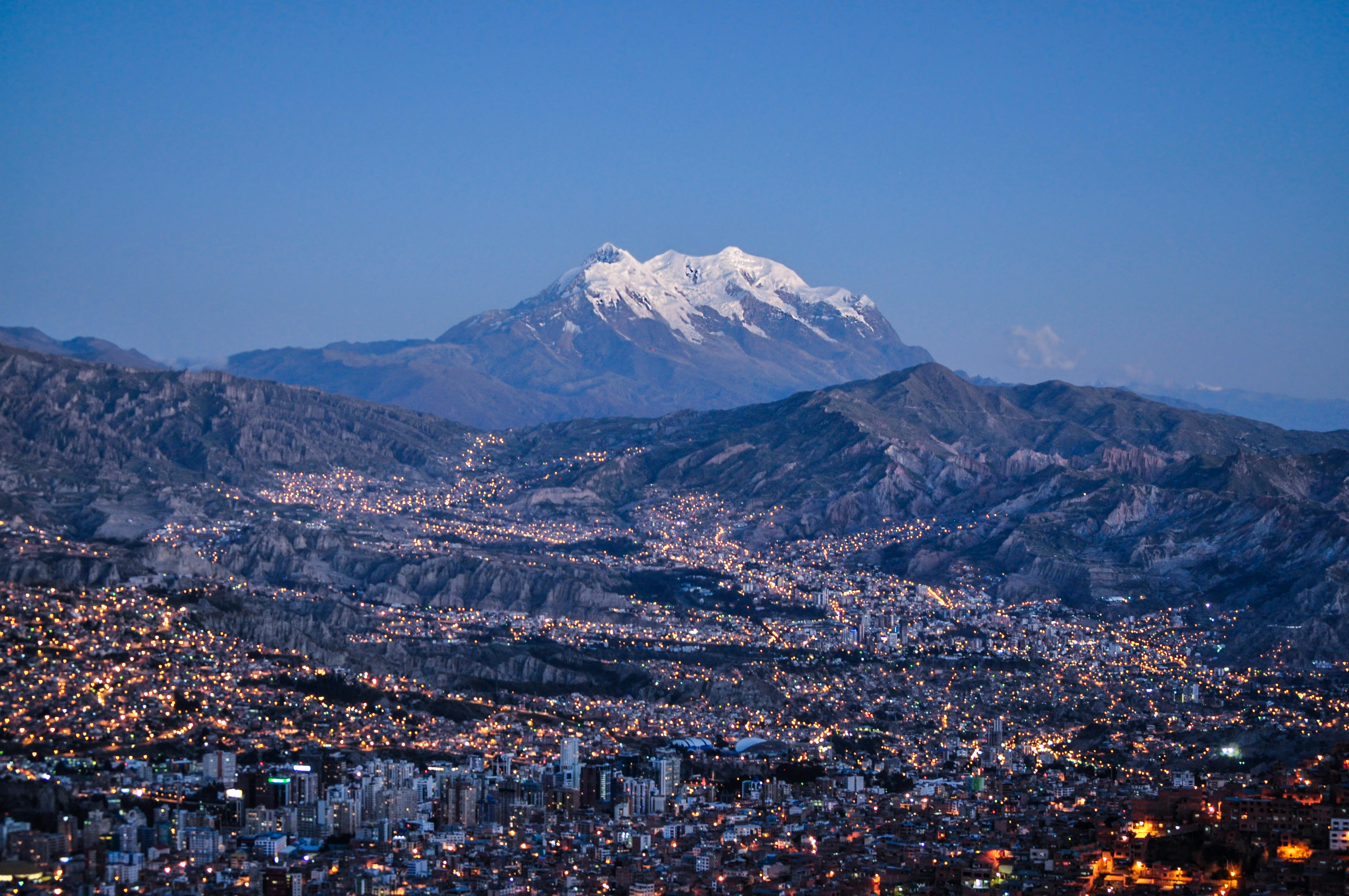
La Paz, Bolivia, is the second-largest city located in the Altiplano (after El Alto).

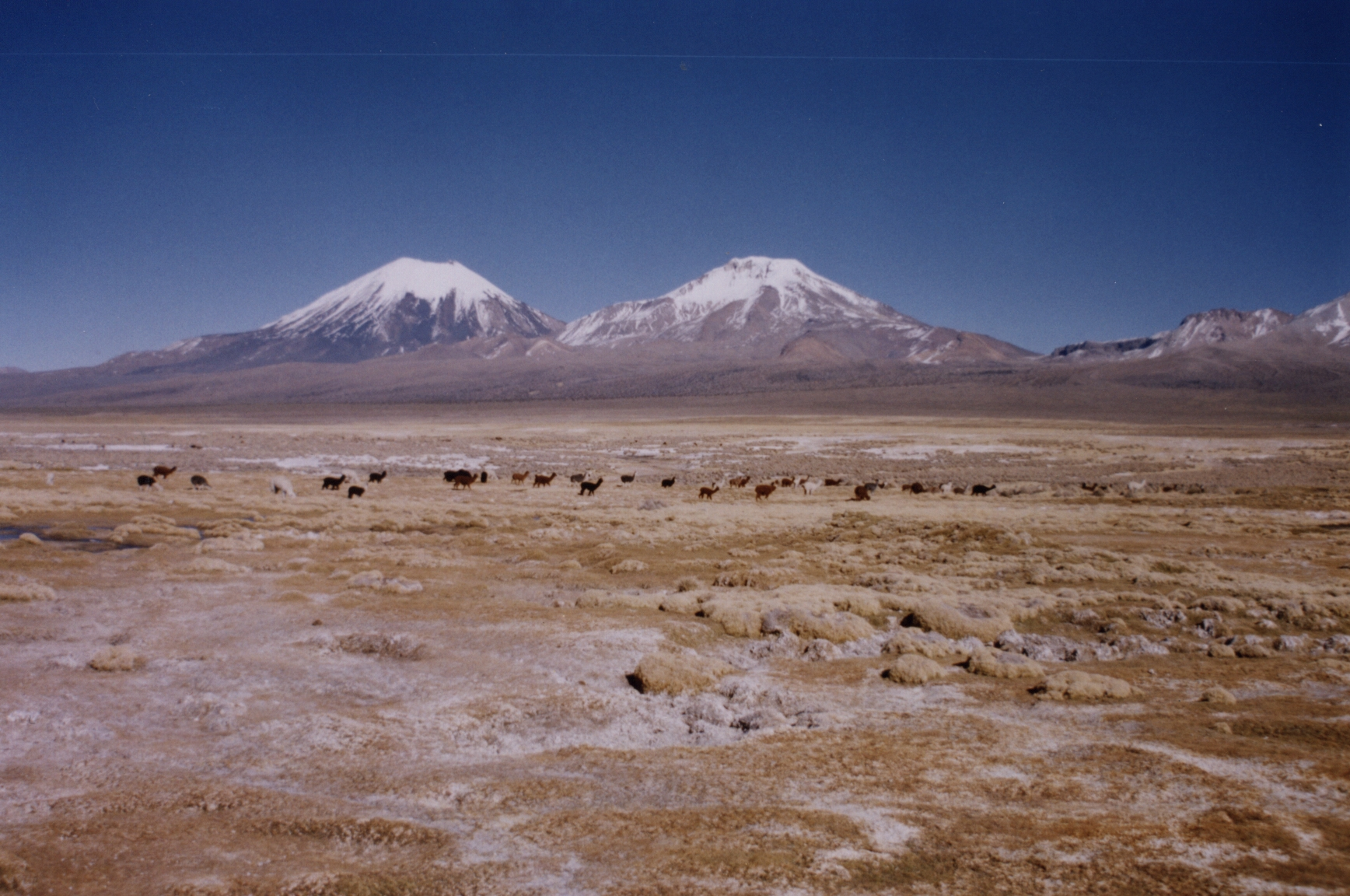
Volcanoes in Sajama National Park (Parinacota and Pomerape)

Due to its average elevation exceeding 3,800 meters above sea level, the climate of the Altiplano is cold and dry, characterized by marked daily temperature fluctuations; the region is sometimes used to identify the altitude zone and the type of climate that prevails within it is colder than that of the tierra fría, but not as cold as that of the tierra helada. Scientists classify the latter as commencing at an elevation around 4,500 meters (or about 15,000 feet). Alternate names used in place of altiplano in this context include puna and páramos.

In general, the climate is cool and humid to semiarid and even arid, with mean annual temperatures that vary from 3 °C (37 °F) near the western mountain range to 12 °C (54 °F) near Lake Titicaca; total annual rainfall ranges between less than 200 mm (8 in) to the southwest to more than 800 mm (31 in) near and over Lake Titicaca. The diurnal cycle of temperature is very wide, with maximum temperatures on the order of 12 to 24 °C (54 to 75 °F) and the minimum on the order of −20 to 10 °C (−4 to 50 °F).

The coldest temperatures occur in the southwestern portion of the Altiplano during winter, between June and July. The seasonal cycle of rainfall is marked, with the rainy season concentrated between December and March. The rest of the year tends to be very dry, cool, windy, and sunny. Snowfall may happen between April and September, especially to the north, but it is not very common, occurring between one and five times a year.

The presence of Lake Titicaca and the Amazon Basin determines variations in the zone's humidity and temperature, with conditions being more humid in the north and west than in the south and east. Lake Titicaca acts as a thermoregulator on the Collao Plateau, moderating temperatures in adjacent areas. Due to its large thermal mass, the lake absorbs heat during the day and releases it at night, thereby reducing the daily and seasonal temperature range compared to other areas of the plateau. This influence creates milder microclimates along its shores, fostering agriculture and human settlement in riparian communities.

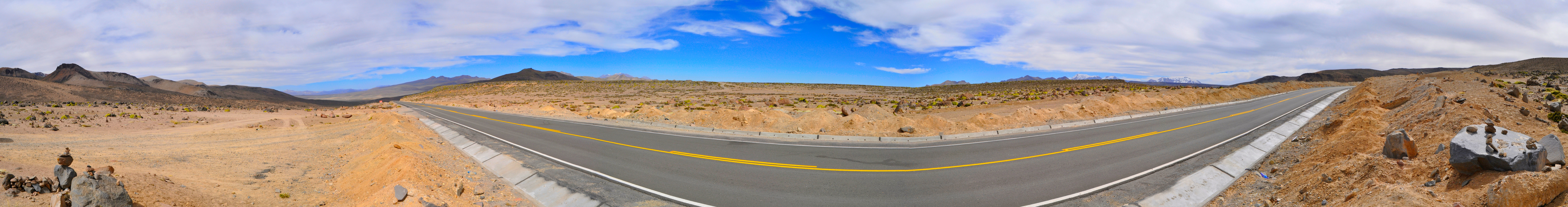
Panorama of Peruvian Altiplano.

== See also ==
- Lake Tauca
- Gran Chaco
- Guatemalan Highlands
- Mexican Plateau
- Puna de Atacama
- Yungas
