= List of life zones by region =

Overview of life zones

The climate and ecology of different locations on the globe naturally separate into life zones, depending on elevation, latitude, and location. The generally strong dependency on elevation is known as altitudinal zonation: the average temperature of a location decreases as the elevation increases.

The general effect of elevation depends on atmospheric physics. However, the specific climate and ecology of any particular location depends on specific features of that location. This article provides a list of life zones by region, in order to illustrate the features of life zones for regions around the globe.

== Central Europe: Switzerland and Germany ==
- Planar zone, under 300 m (Eastern Alps), under 150 m (Central Uplands), agriculture.
- Foothill zone, 300 – 800 m (Eastern Alps), 150 – 300 m (Central Uplands), oak limit (Quercus spp.). European beech (Fagus sylvatica), Sessile oak (Quercus petraea), Pedunculate oak or English oak (Quercus robur), European or common hornbeam (Carpinus betulus) and small-leaved Lime (Tilia cordata). Grape crop limit (Vitis spp.), around 600 m, Switzerland, North, south-facing slopes, estimated 7.5 °C. Crops: maize for feed; sweet maize (Zea mays).
- Submontane zone, 700 - 1,000 m (Eastern Alps), 300 – 450 m (Central Uplands), European beech (Fagus sylvatica), Silver Fir or European Silver Fir (Abies alba) and Norway Spruce (Picea abies). Coniferous forests by reforestation limit around 800 m, North.
- Montane zone, 800 – 1,200 m (Eastern Alps), 450 – 650 m (Central Uplands), rye (Secale cereale) crop limit and wheat (Triticum spp.) crop limit.
- Mid-Montane zone, 1,000 – 1,400 m (Eastern Alps), 650 – 800 m (Central Uplands). Limit of the whole year populated areas, limit of a growing season of 100 days.
- Altimontane zone, 1,300 – 1,850 m (Eastern Alps), 800 – 1,500 m (Central Uplands). Deciduous forests limit, Sycamore Maple (Acer pseudoplatanus) and European beech (Fagus sylvatica).
- Subalpine zone, 1,500 – 2,500 m (Eastern Alps), above 1,500 m (Central Uplands), Scots Pine (Pinus sylvestris), Norway Spruce (Picea abies), Swiss Pine (Pinus cembra, Arve or Zirbel) limit and European Larch (Larix decidua) limit, 2,000 m, some specimens up to 2,850 m, south-facing slopes. Tree line and Krummholz zone or ecotone (stunted subalpine bushes), Sub-alpine meadow and Alpine climate.
- Alpine zone, 2,000 - 3,000 m (Eastern Alps), Montane grasslands and shrublands. Mountain Pine or Mugo Pine (Pinus mugo) limit. Alpine meadows just used in the warm season.
- Snow zone, above 3,000 m (Eastern Alps), alpine desert, permafrost, scree and above snow line.

== Mediterranean: Corsica ==
- Thermomediterranean vegetation belt, 150 m (south) and 100 m (north); shrub of Pistacia lentiscus and dense mediterranean coastal scrub (maquis) with Quercus ilex, Phillyrea, Myrtus communis and wild olive (Olea europaea var. sylvestris).
- Mesomediterranean vegetation belt, up to 700 m (northern slopes) and 900 m (southern slopes); Erica arborea, Arbutus unedo and Quercus ilex. Forests include Quercus suber, Pinus pinaster, Quercus pubescens and Castanea sativa too.
- Supramediterranean vegetation belt, 500– 700 m up to 900- 1,000 m (northern slopes), or 800- 1,000 m to 1,200- 1,350 m (southern slopes); Erica arborea, Quercus ilex, Quercus petraea, Pinus nigra ssp. laricio, Alnus cordata, Ilex aquifolium, Taxus baccata and Ostrya carpinifolia.
- Montane vegetation belt, 900- 1,000 m to 1,600 m (northern slopes) and 1,300 to 1,800 m (southern slopes); forests of Pinus nigra ssp. laricio, Fagus sylvatica and Abies alba. Quercus ilex, Quercus pubescens, Pinus pinaster, Castanea sativa and Erica arborea not present anymore.
- Cryo-oromediterranean vegetation belt, 1,700- 1,800 m to 2,200 m (only southern slopes); above the upper Tree line (Pinus nigra ssp. laricio goes up to 1,800 m), dwarft bushes of Genista lobelii var. lobelioides, Astragalus sirinicus ssp. genargenteus, Anthyllis hemanniae, Thymus herbabarona, Berberis aetnensis and Juniperus communis ssp. alpina.
- Subalpine vegetation belt, 1,400- 1,600 m to 2,100 m (only northern slopes); Alnus viridis ssp. suaveolens, Acer pseudoplatanus, Sorbus aucuparia ssp. praemorsa.
- Alpine vegetation belt, above 2,100 m; sparse vegetation.
- Indicator plants: Rock Speedwell (Veronica fruticans), Potentilla crassinervia, Armeria pusilla, Cerastium thomasii, Phyteuma serratum, Stachys corsica and Helichrysum frigidum.

== Tropical Andes 10°S ==
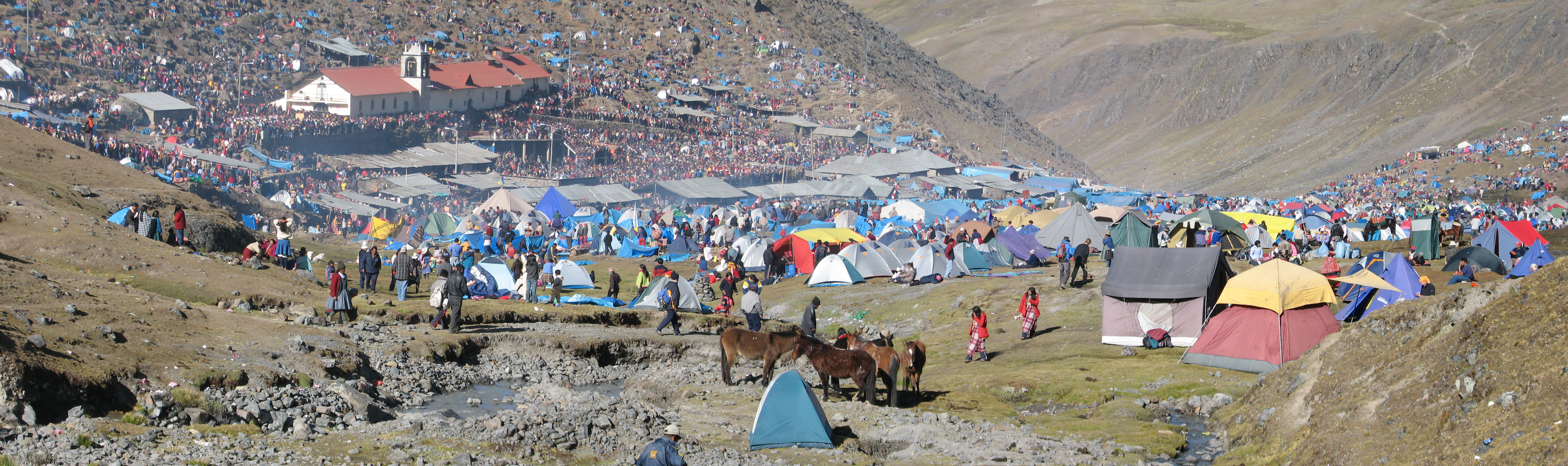
Sanctuary of Qoyllur Rit'i - Mountain Tundra

Classic Version - Regions of the Amazonic Side

- Sea level, 22 to 24 °C (72 to 75 °F), but the cold Humboldt Current generates fog.
- Tierra caliente (Hot land) up to 750–1,000 m (2,460–3,280 ft).
- Tierra templada (Temperate land) up to 1,850–2,000 m (6,070–6,560 ft). The warmest month has an average temperature of below 22 °C (72 °F).
- Tierra fría (Cool land) below 3,600 m (11,800 ft). The warmest month has an average temperature of below 18 °C (64 °F).
- Tierra helada (Cold land) above 3,600 m (11,800 ft). The tree line occurs when the warmest month has an average temperature of below 10 °C (50 °F).
- Tierra Nevada, above the Snow line at 4,500–5,500 m (14,800–18,000 ft).

== Kilimanjaro ==
Kilimanjaro, Tanzania (3°7′0″S 37°35′0″E) & Mount Kenya, Kenya, (0°9′0″S 37°18′0″E)

- Malindi; Kenya; 23 m; average annual temperature 26.5 °C; average annual precipitation 1'095 mm; 3°14′0″S 40°6′0″E
- Kilimanjaro Base at around 1,300, crops at around 1,300 - 1,800 m (West Slope is too dry): Coffee (Coffea arabica), Banana (Musa spp.), Mango (Mangifera indica), Avocado (Persea americana). Traditional agriculture uses a multilayer system to save water: Bananas are under the shadows of mango trees, avocado trees and Albizia schimperiana var. amaniensis, Coffee bushes and vegetables are under the shadows of bananas;
- Nairobi International Airport; Kenya; 1,624 m; average annual temperature 19.0 °C; average annual precipitation 889 mm; 01°19′09″S 36°55′39″E
- Subtropical moist broadleaf forests, between 1,400 and 3,000 m (4,600 and 9,800 ft), max. 3,300 m. Bamboo Zone needs quite a lot of water, it is missing at the Kilimanjaro because of the agriculture;
- Timberline forest, "goat's beard" lichen (Usnea spp.), between 3,000 and 3,500 m (9,800 and 11,500 ft);
- Tree line, 2,700–3,000 m (8,900–9,800 ft), max. 3,500 m (Coniferae are absent);
- Heathland and chaparral, between 3,200 and 3,800 m (10,500 and 12,500 ft). Giant Lobelias, up to ca. 4,000 m; Subalpine forests with Ericaceae up to 4,100 m (as high as 10 m);
- Afro-alpine zone, above about 3,800 m (12,500 ft), giant groundsels up to 4,500 m;
- Nival zone, usually above 4,500 m (14,800 ft).
- Vulcano Kibo - Uhuru Peak, 5,895 m rock and ice. As the conifers are absent, the tree line is lower.

=== Vegetation zones ===
Simplified grid system. Oldest mountain on the left, Ngaliema - Mount Stanley, 3,951 m; Rwenzori Mountains or Mountains of the Moon (Africa).

In the altitudes between 3,400 and 4,500 m (11,200 and 14,800 ft) some of the most extreme examples of adaptations can be found. At altitudes below 3,400 m (11,200 ft) the daily temperature fluctuations are less extreme, the average daily temperature steadily increases, and the growth forms and ecology of the Dendroseneico reflect the increased influence of biotic factors (such as competition for light) over abiotic factors (such as nightly frost).

== Jade Dragon Snow Mountains ==
The Jade Dragon Snow Mountains contain the glacier nearest of the Equator in the Northern Hemisphere. The landmarks 4,506 m and 4,680 m at the end of the glacier can be reached through the cable car from Ganhaizi (Tibetan for dry lake, a grassland with conifers at 3,400 m). The mountain desert begins around 4,000 m. The Three Parallel Rivers of Yunnan (UNESCO World Heritage Site) encompasses the watershed areas of the Yangtze (Jinsha), Mekong (Lan Cang) and Salween (Nujiang) rivers and is the joint of the Palearctic realm and the Indomalayan realm.

- Shanzidou Peak; 5,596 m (18,360 ft); 27°05′54″N 100°10′30″E
- Lijiang; Yunnan is at 2,600 m, the Black Dragon Pool is 15 km south of the mountains; 26°52′34″N 100°13′48″E
- Quambo/ Changdu; 3,306 m; avg annual temperature 7.5 °C; avg annual precipitation 463 mm; 31°09′00″N 97°10′00″E
- Sichuan Xichang; 1,591 m; avg annual temperature 16.9 °C; avg annual precipitation 974 mm; 27°54′00″N 102°16′00″E
- Taiwan Airport; 48 m; avg annual temperature 21.6 °C; avg annual precipitation 1,714 mm; 25°04′35″N 121°13′26″E
- Haikou airport, Hainan; 15 m; avg annual temperature 23.9 °C; avg annual precipitation 1,613 mm; 20°01′04″N 110°20′01″E
- Hanoi; 15 m; avg annual temperature 23.8 °C; avg annual precipitation 1,682 mm; 21°02′00″N 105°51′00″E

== Ferrocarril Chihuahua al Pacífico ==
- Mazatlán; 4 m; average annual temperature 24.3 °C, average annual precipitation 860 mm, 23°12′0″N 106°25′0″W
- City of Los Mochis, Sinaloa and its port Topolobampo; sea level
- Rising as high as 2,400 m (7,900 ft) above sea level near the continental divide (Divisadero)
- Chihuahua (Ferrocarril Chihuahua al Pacífico), Chihuahua; 1,435 m; average annual temperature 18.4 °C, average annual precipitation 368 mm, 28°38′0″N 106°05′0″W

== Darjeeling Himalayan Railway ==
- Dhaka, Bangladesh; 9 m; average annual temperature 25.6 °C, average annual precipitation 2,039 mm, 23°46′0″N 90°23′0″E
- Kolkata, West Bengal; 6 m; average annual temperature 26.9 °C, average annual precipitation 1,739 mm, 22°32′0″N 88°20′0″E
- Rangpur, Bangladesh; 34 m; average annual temperature 24.2 °C, average annual precipitation 2,309.5 mm, 25.56°N 89.25°E
- Siliguri, West Bengal; 122 m; average annual temperature is 23.7 °C, average annual precipitation 3,340 mm, 26°42′36″N 88°25′48″E
- Cherrapunji, Meghalaya; 1,313m; average annual temperature 17.3 °C, average annual precipitation 11,777 mm, 25°15′0″N 91°44′0″E
- Darjeeling (Darjeeling Himalayan Railway), West Bengal; 2,127 m; average annual temperature 11.8 °C, average annual precipitation 3,037 mm, 27°3′0″N 88°16′0″E

== Other regions ==
- Life zones of the North Cascades in the Pacific Northwest of America
- Life zones of the Sierra Nevada in California
