= Puna grassland =

Type of grassland in the central part of the high Andes

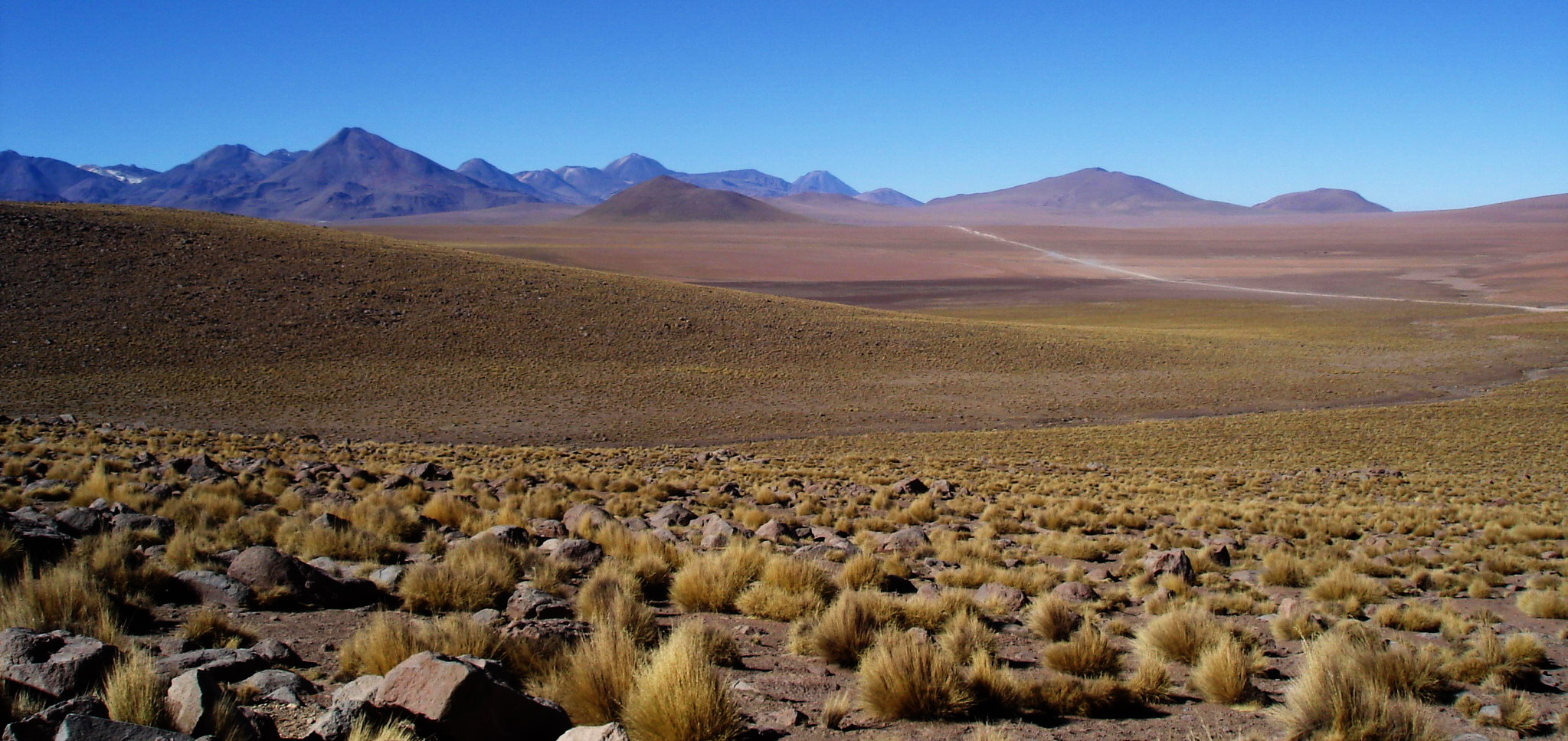
- Puna grassland in the Chilean altiplano

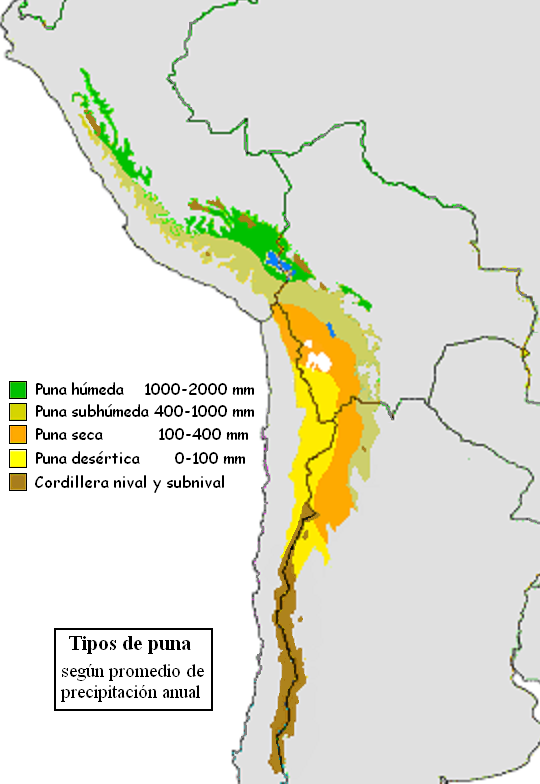

Geography
- Area: 586,100 km^{2} (226,300 sq mi)
- Countries: Peru; Bolivia; Chile; Argentina

The puna grassland ecoregion, part of the Andean montane grasslands and shrublands biome, is found in the central Andes Mountains of South America. It is considered one of the eight Natural Regions in Peru, but extends south, across Chile, Bolivia, and western northwest Argentina. The term puna encompasses diverse ecosystems of the high Central Andes above 3200–3400 m.

== Location ==
The puna is found above the treeline at 3200–3500 m elevation, and below the permanent snow line above 4500–5000 m elevation. It extends from central Peru in the north, across the Altiplano plateau of Peru, Chile and Bolivia, and south along the spine of the Andes into northwest Argentina.

Other sources claim that it goes on Suni (high plateaus and cliffs, some agriculture) and from 4000 m to the snow line (permafrost and alpine desert) of puna grassland (mountain tops and slopes, much colder).

== Ecoregions ==
The puna is a diverse ecosystem that comprises varied ecoregions labeled wet/moist puna, dry puna and desert puna.

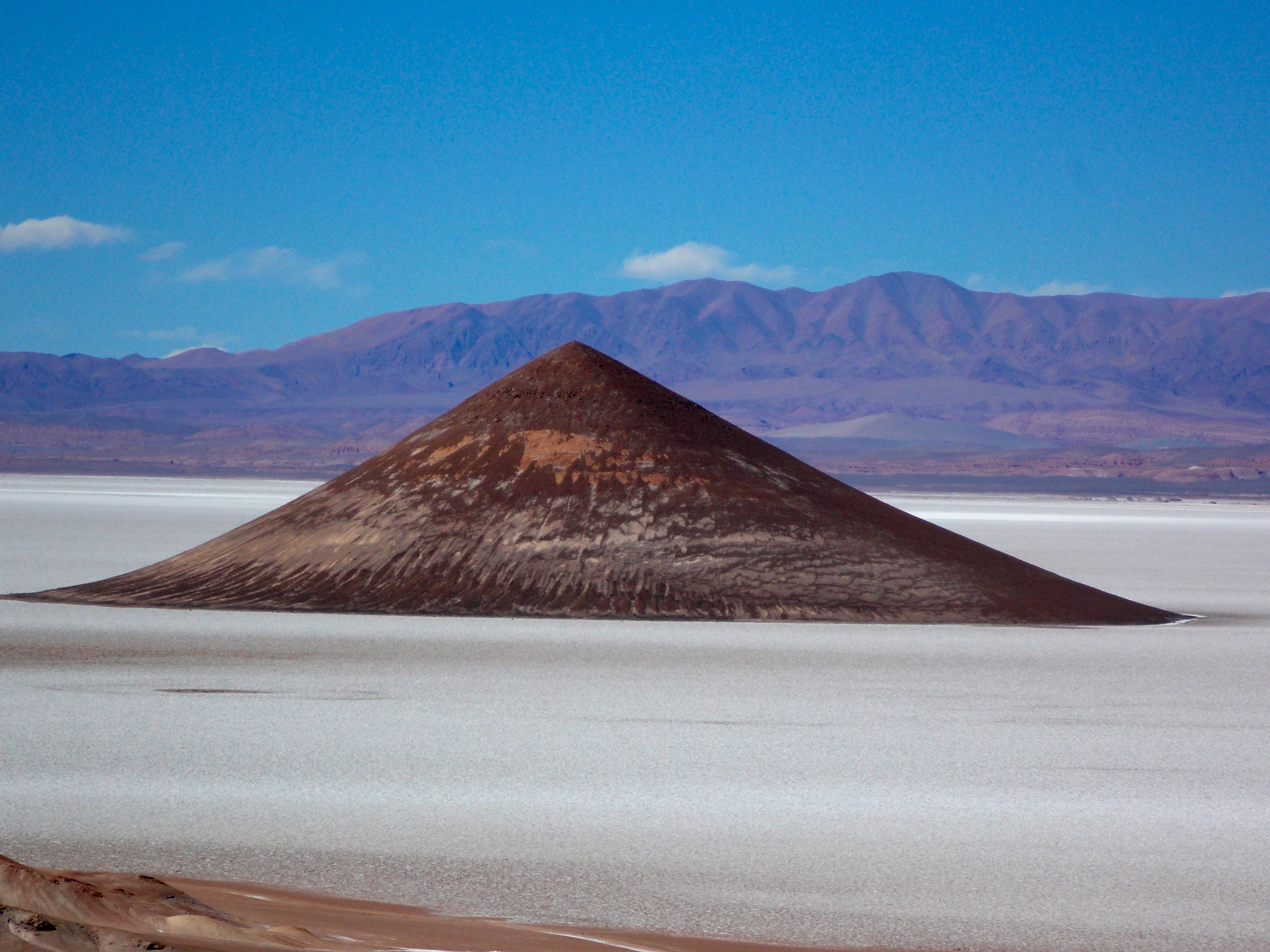
Cono de Arita in Salar de Arizaro, Salta province (Argentina)

=== Wet/moist puna (Central Andean wet puna) ===
This ecoregion is a high elevation, wet, montane grassland in the southern high Andes, occurring from northern Peru to northern Bolivia. The wet puna shares its border on the west with the Sechura desert and the east with the wet Peruvian Yungas. The characteristically mountainous landscape contains high lakes, mountain valleys, snow-covered mountains, and plateaux. The high elevation of the wet puna (4200 to 5000 m) causes the area to have large temperature differences between night and day. The average annual temperature is low, ranging from 5 to 7 °C; with night frost periods from March to October. Temperatures shift from characteristic summer highs in the day and drop to winter lows at night. This extreme temperature shift has caused selective adaptation to occur and many endemic plants such as the Culcitium, Perezia, and Polylepis center their diversity in the wet puna. The ecoregion contains snow-capped peaks, glacial lakes, and several rivers that originate in the Cordilleras. The biggest lake in the ecoregion is Lake Titicaca, which is the highest navigable lake in the world, at an elevation of 3800 m (above sea level). The Suches and Tiwanacu rivers in Bolivia are the lakes tributaries. The areas in the north surrounding Lake Titicaca have eight wet months, and the areas in the south have one to two wet months. The average precipitation in this region ranges from 400 to 2000 mm.

=== Dry puna (Central Andean dry puna) ===
This ecoregion is a very dry, high elevation montane grassland of the southern high Andes. It extends into northern Chile and northwest Argentina and east into western Bolivia occurring above 3500 m between the tree and permanent snow lines. The vegetation of the dry puna consists of tropical alpine herbs with dwarf shrubs. Within the dry puna are salt flats, high plateaus, snow-covered peaks and volcanoes. Dry puna is distinguished from the other types of puna by its diminished annual rainfall. The dry puna has an 8-month long dry season and receives less than 400 mm of rainfall each year. The region lies at an elevation of 3500–5000 m above sea level. The dry puna is oligothermic as well. The average temperatures in this ecoregion range from 8 to 11 degrees Celsius and are lowest in the south. As a result of the elevation, varied temperatures and lack of rainfall, the Central Andean dry puna is a unique ecoregion with highly adapted flora and fauna. The southern region of the dry puna encompasses an even drier puna known as the desert puna. In the desert puna the average rainfall ranges from only 51–406 mm. The desert puna is dominated by the huge salt lakes and is known for the scattered halophytes around and in the depressions. These salt lakes are home to the endemic Andean flamingo.

The World Wildlife fund defines three distinct puna sub-ecoregions:

- NT1003 Central Andean wet puna (Bolivia, Peru) – With about 1000 mm of precipitation each year, it tends to be covered by grasses mixed with herbs, lichens, mosses, and ferns. Wet areas have sedges and rushes. The Polylepis forests of 10,000 years ago were likely cleared by fire for agriculture and grazing. Many areas are farmed. It extends from north-central Peru, adjacent to the páramos, and reaches southeast to along the eastern altiplano of Bolivia.
- NT1002 Central Andean puna (Bolivia, Peru, Chile, Argentina) – Covering most of southern Peru, the region is dominated by shrublands and thickets of tola shrubs.
- NT1001 Central Andean dry puna (Northwest Argentina, Bolivia, Chile) – Mostly in the southern part of the Central Andes along the western cordillera of Bolivia. There is little agriculture.

== Soil composition ==
Puna soils are composed of an organic rich layer and a stony layer. The average soil profile is 33 cm deep. The puna ecosystem has a low diversity of bacteria in its soils. The rhizosphere of the grasses are dominated by the Bacillas species, these organisms are composed of dormant cells that enable them to survive in the extreme climatic conditions in the puna ecosystem. The dormant bacterial community of puna grasses is similar to those found in desert soils.

== Flora ==
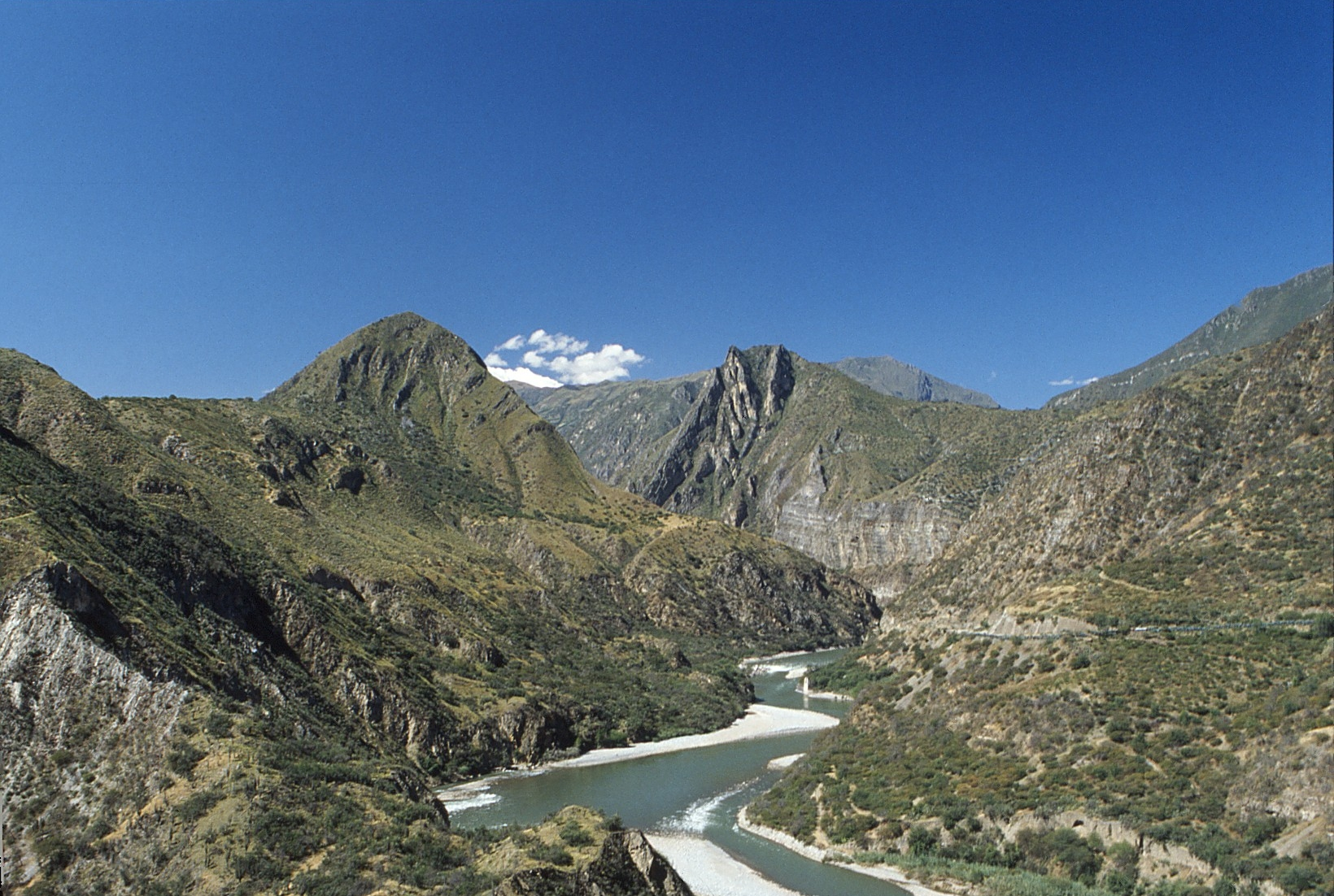
Plateaus in the puna region, Ayacucho, Peru

The puna flora is characterized by its unique assemblages of cushion and mat forming species. Many of these species, most notably the large Azorella compacta (Yareta) has been heavily harvested for fuel and medicinal use. The vegetation with the puna grassland displays complex patterns of spatial variation, despite the low cover and overall density. The puna belt which ranges from wet puna in the north of the Andes to dry puna to the southwestern Andes is composed mostly by poaceae (Grasses) and shrubs of the asteraceae (daisy) family. Other representative grasses include species Jarava ichu ("Paja Brava"), Calamagrostis vicunarum ("Crespillo"), and Festuca dolichophylla ("Chillihua").

There are several main rock unit formations in the Puna with distinct soil conditions that can be used to identify the main flora of each area. Up to 3000 m above the desert, the arid vegetation of the mountainous steppe is characterized by columnar cacti, arid shrubs and herbs. Vegetation located between 3800 and 4000 m are sustained by brown andic soils on ash-fall deposits and includes many endemic plant species as Hersodoma arequipensis, Piplostephium tacorense and Opuntia corotilla. In the wettest area shrubby vegetation of families asteraceae, fabaceae and solanaceae dominate. The puna is generally drier than the páramo montane grasslands of the northern Andes.

== Fauna ==
=== Mammals ===
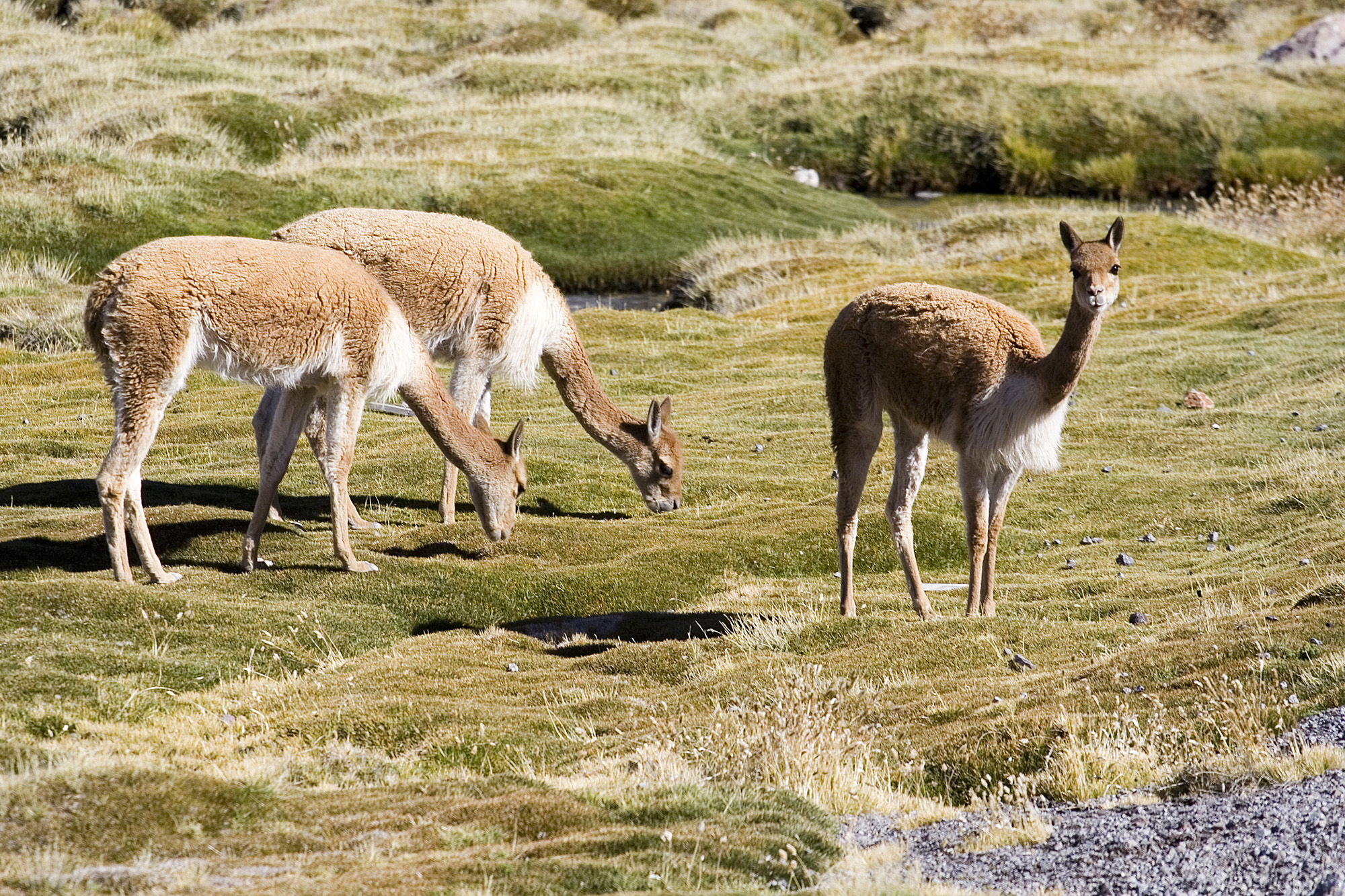
Grazing vicuñas in northern Chile

Native mammals include (domesticated) llama and alpaca, and their wild relatives, the vicuña and guanaco. The rare Taruca deer is shy and reserved. Also present are well-known rodent species, such as chinchilla, paca, and the montane guinea pig. Among carnivorous animals, there are puma (mountain lion), Pampas cat, the rare Andean mountain cat, Andean fox, and some Spectacled bear. Relatively few birds, such as the Darwin's rhea, Andean condor, and certain miners and yellow-finches, are found in the vast expanses of puna grasslands; however, many more birds are associated with the highland lakes and marshes that are found in the puna. The most common examples are the Andean goose, Andean flamingo, Andean avocet, giant coot, puna teal and diademed sandpiper-plover. The highland puna is a biome that encompasses relatively large reserves.

=== Birds ===
Bird populations in the puna ecosystem are surprisingly diverse for such a harsh and extreme environment. For example, the Lauca National Park includes 148 species of birds, which represents about one third of the entire Chilean bird population. Many of these species are rare and attract visitors to the area. One example of this rare avifauna is the giant flightless Darwin's rhea (Rhea pennata), which is similar to the ostrich found in the Old World, reaching up to one meter in height and 20 kg in weight. The puna also includes a great variety of aquatic species particularly at Chungará Lake located in northern Chile. The puna ecosystem has a great diversity of freshwater fish. Some of these include the giant coot, the silvery grebe, the Chilean teal, and the diademed sandpiper-plover (one of the rarest shorebirds in the world).

== Human impact and conservation ==
Puna grasslands are being rapidly depleted by human activity, and as a result need much attention in the conservation realm. Numerous factors can lead to the cause of this destruction, but the preservation of it depends almost entirely on to what degree humans are populating the area. Humans dramatically shape the ecosystem through the conversion of much of the land to farming grounds and grazing areas. Due to the high demand for cooking and heating fuel among the residents of the area, much of the land is degraded. For example, trees of the polylepis genus used to be easily found throughout the ecosystem and now are scarce.

People of this region cultivate barley, potatoes and maca. Alpacas, vicuñas, and guanacos are raised for wool, and llamas for wool and transport. Human habitation in the puna is widespread and tends to increase to the east, toward the moister areas. Native tubers and grains are cultivated over large areas of the central puna. The inhabitants of this region cultivate native tubers (potatoes and maca) along with non-native grains such as barley and native pseudocereals such as quinoa. Alpacas, vicuñas, llamas, and guanacos are raised for wool and, as a result, most of the entirety of the puna is under the effect of animal grazing. Cattle, horses, and donkeys are localized in the wet/humid puna while llama, sheep and alpaca can be raised in both the wet and drier areas of the puna.

The most widespread influence on the grasslands is extensive grazing combined with the effects of fire. Grazing dries out the land, making it more susceptible to fire. Once a land has been exposed to fire, it makes it more likely to burn again, creating a feedback loop that leads to damage of the ecosystem. Fire often accompanies grazing as a management tool and is one of the main threats to the grasslands. The drier areas are being threatened with progression to desertification. Despite the fact that the puna grasslands experience heavy grazing, as an ecosystem it is highly resilient. In these areas of high grazing, successional species of grass and forbs grow back thick, thereby preserving the soil which means its potential to rebound is higher.

The grasslands are also influenced more locally by agriculture, mining, and waste disposal depending on the concentration of the population. There are two predominant forms of management of the puna grazing lands. The first is communal. In this form of management, the community controls the land and every member of that community grazes livestock. This generally leads to overgrazing and degradation of the land. The second style of management is cooperative. This type of management originated from a movement that took land from large landholders and turned it over to council composed of workers. Agronomists and animal scientists see over the land and make sure the grazing is sustainable.

Though there are a significant number of problems in puna grasslands, mostly being attributed to overgrazing, there are measures being taken to improve the current situation. These impact measures are minimal however, since the ratio of protected areas to the rest of the ecosystem is minute. A growing population, construction of new roads, and mining activities are all acting as hindrances to the conservation of the ecosystem. Luckily, awareness is being raised about the problem, and steps are being taken to help improve its preservation. Currently range management programs are being introduced in many of the neighboring universities to research new ideas that implement little technology and can help restore the ecosystem. With the right management, the puna grasslands can rebound and support the growing populations of the surrounding areas. Ultimately however, it is up to the local individuals of the area to coordinate other ways they can receive income in ways that does not harm the land.

== Overview ==
Andean Continental Divide

Westside	Eastside
Chala, dry coast	Lowland tropical rainforest or Selva baja
Maritime Yungas	Highland tropical rainforest or Selva alta
Maritime Yungas	Subtropical cloud forest or Fluvial Yungas
Quechua - Montane valleys	Quechua - Montane valleys
Tree line	Tree line - about 3,500 m
Suni, scrubs and agriculture	Suni, scrubs and agriculture

== See also ==
- Climate zones by altitude
- Altitudinal zonation
- Puna de Atacama
