= Tierra templada =

Tierra templada (Spanish for temperate land) is a pseudo-climatological term used in Latin America to refer to places which are either located in the tropics at a moderately high elevation or are marginally outside the astronomical tropics, producing a somewhat cooler overall climate than that found in the tropical lowlands, the zone of which is known as the tierra caliente.

In countries situated close to the equator, the tierra templada typically has an elevation span of between 750 and 1,850 metres (2,460 and 6,070 ft). These thresholds become lower as the latitude increases. The Peruvian geographer Javier Pulgar Vidal used following altitudes:

- 1,000 m as the border between the tropical rainforest and the subtropical cloud forest
- 2,300 m as the end of the subtropical cloud forest (Yunga fluvial)
- 3,500 m as the treeline
- 4,800 m as the puna end

Tierra templada has mean average temperature between 18 and 22 °C (64 and 72 °F). Coffee is grown extensively as a cash crop, with grains such as wheat and corn being cultivated for subsistence purposes - in contrast to the warmer tierra caliente, where tropical fruits predominate. Xalapa in Mexico is an example of a city that lies in the tierra templada, having a subtropical highland climate under the Köppen climate classification.

== See also ==
- Köppen climate classification
- Altitudinal zonation
- Tierra caliente, ecoregion border, 2,500 ft or 1,000 m (Javier Pulgar Vidal)
- Tierra fría, ecoregion border, 6,000 ft or 2,300 m (Javier Pulgar Vidal)
- Tierra helada, ecoregion border, treeline: 12,000 ft or 3,500 m (Javier Pulgar Vidal)
- Hill station
