= Tierra caliente =

Latina American places with tropical climates

Tierra caliente is an informal term used in Latin America to refer to places with a distinctly tropical climate. These are usually regions from 0 to 3,000 feet above sea level. The Peruvian geographer Javier Pulgar Vidal used the altitude of 1,000 m as the border between the tropical rain forest and the subtropical cloud forest (Yunga fluvial).

Most tierra caliente regions are along coastal plains, but some interior basin regions also fit the label. Agriculture in those areas is dominated by tropical crops, such as bananas and sugar cane.

== See also ==
- Köppen climate classification
- Altitudinal zonation
- Tierra Caliente (Mexico), a low-elevation area in southwestern Mexico
- Tierra templada, ecoregion border: 2,500 ft or 1,000 m (Javier Pulgar Vidal)
- Tierra fría, ecoregion border, 6,000 ft or 2,300 m (Javier Pulgar Vidal)
- Tierra helada, ecoregion border, treeline: 12,000 ft or 3,500 m (Javier Pulgar Vidal)

== Literature ==
This category is being considered for deletion. This nomination is part of a discussion of several related categories.

This does not mean that any of the pages that are listed in the category page will be deleted. They may, however, be recategorized.
Please share your thoughts on the matter at this category's entry on the Categories for discussion page. Please do not empty the category or remove this notice while the discussion is in progress.
add entry: {{subst:cfd2|Tierra caliente|header=Template:SouthAm-geo-stub|text=Your reason(s) for the proposed deletion. ~~~~}}

Administrators: If this category is empty, and all incoming links have been cleaned up, click here to delete.
