= Tierra helada =

Tierra Helada (Spanish for "frozen land"), also known as Tierra Nevada (Spanish for "snowy land"), is a term used in Latin America to refer to the highest places found within the Andes mountains.

The Tierra Helada comprises the montane grasslands and shrublands, sunis, punas and páramos between the tree line and the snow line. The term tierra helada is accurate from a climatological standpoint, as its land is indeed "frozen", situated above the snow line. In the northern Andes, the latter is located at an altitude of approximately 15,000 ft (or about 4,500 m).

The Peruvian geographer Javier Pulgar Vidal (Altitudinal zonation) used following altitudes:

- 1,000 m (3,300 ft) as the border between the tropical rainforest and the subtropical cloud forest
- 2,300 m (7,500 ft) m as the end of the subtropical cloud forest (Yunga fluvial)
- 3,500 m (11,500 ft) m as the tree line
- 4,800 m (15,700 ft) m as the puna end

== See also ==
- Altitudinal zonation
- Köppen climate classification
- Life zones of Peru
- Tierra caliente, ecoregion border: 2,500 ft or 1,000 m (Javier Pulgar Vidal)
- Tierra templada, ecoregion border: 6,000 ft or 2,300 m (Javier Pulgar Vidal)
- Tierra fría, ecoregion border, tree line: 12,000 ft or 3,500 m (Javier Pulgar Vidal)
