= Tierra fría =

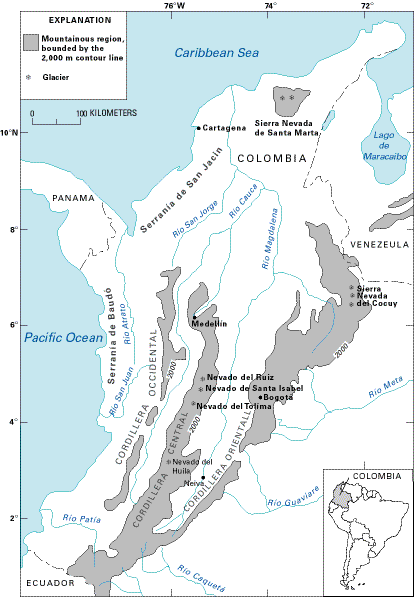
Tierra fría in Colombia.

In Latin America, tierra fría (Spanish for cold land) are mountain locations where high elevation results in a markedly cooler climate than that encountered in the lowlands at a comparable latitude. The combination of low latitude and high altitude — typically between approximately 2,000 m (about 6,500 ft) and 3,500 m (about 11,500 ft) in locations within 10° of the equator — produces a climate that falls into the same category as many oceanic climates found along the west coasts of the continents within the temperate zones — mild temperatures all year round, with monthly averages ranging from about 10°C (50°F) in the coldest months to about 18°C (64.4°F) in the warmest months (at places further poleward the range of altitudes where this climate exists becomes progressively lower). Common crops grown in the tierra fría are potatoes, wheat, barley, oats, corn, and rye.

Beyond the tierra fría is a region known as the suni, puna, or páramos; near the Equator this encompasses places with altitudes of between roughly 3,500 m (11,500 ft) and 4,500 m (15,000 ft), representing the treeline and the snow line respectively. Vegetation here resembles that found in the tundra of the polar regions. Still higher is the tierra nevada, where permanent snow and ice prevail. The Peruvian geographer Javier Pulgar Vidal (Altitudinal zonation) used following altitudes: 2,300 m (end of the Cloud forest or Yunga fluvial), 3,500 m (Treeline) and 4,800 m (Puna end).

Some of Latin America's largest cities are found in the tierra fria, most notably Bogotá, Colombia, altitude 2,640 m, Mexico City, Mexico, altitude 2,240 m and Quito, Ecuador, altitude 2,850 m; all three cities are also the capitals of their respective countries.

Agriculture in the region resembles that which is conducted in valley areas in the temperate zones, featuring such crops as barley and potatoes.

== See also ==
- Köppen climate classification
- Altitudinal zonation
- Tierra caliente
- Tierra templada
- Tierra helada
- Hill station
