= Yungas =

Natural region in South America

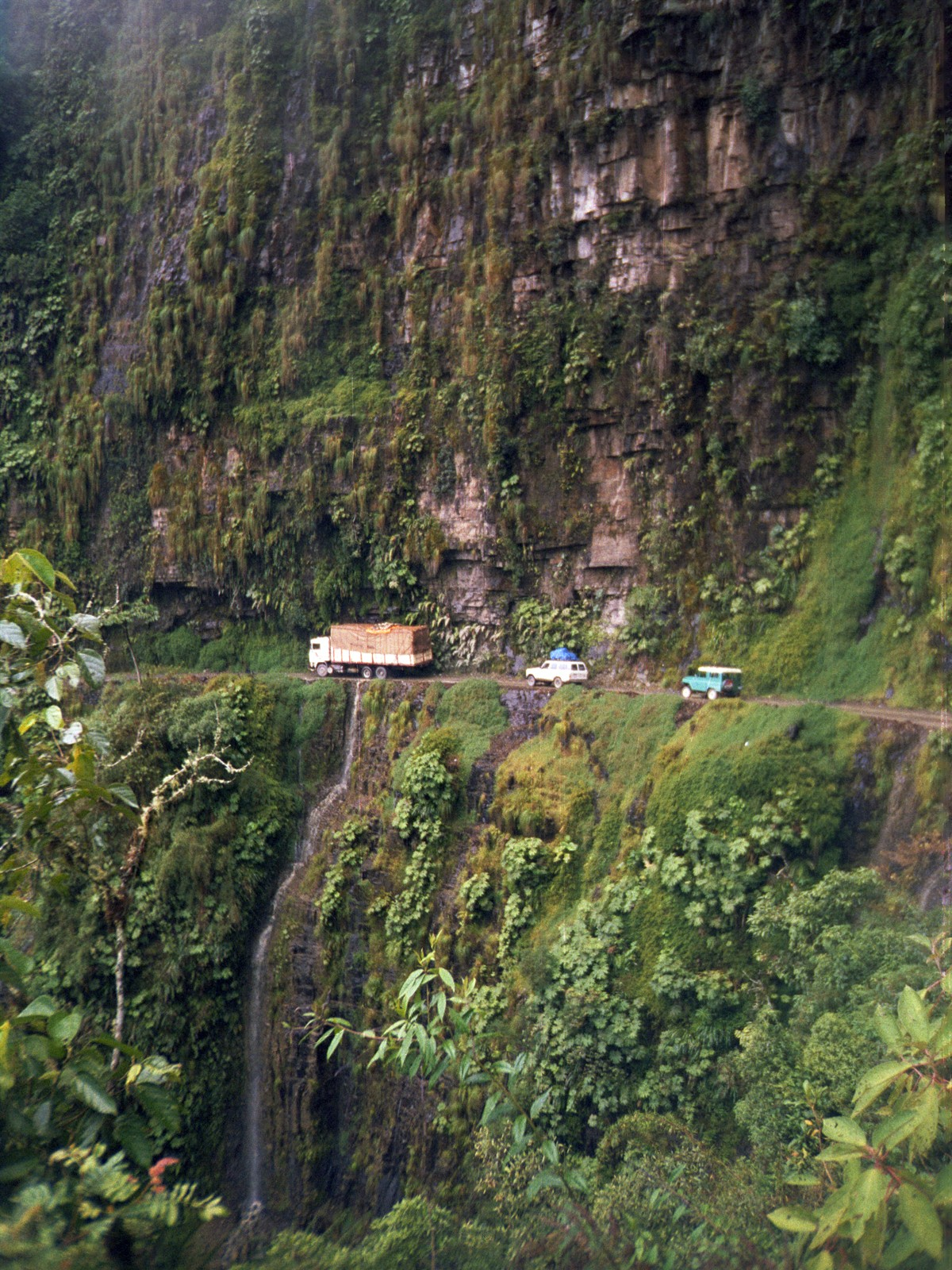
- Yungas Road in Bolivia

- Map of the region in Bolivia

Ecology
- Realm: Neotropics
- Biome: Tropical moist forest

Geography
- Countries: Peru; Bolivia; Argentina

The Yungas (Aymara yunka; 'warm or temperate Andes or earth', Quechua yunka; 'warm area on the slopes of the Andes') is a bioregion of a narrow band of forest along the eastern slope of the Andes Mountains from Peru and Bolivia, and extends into the Argentine Northwest at the slope of the Andes pre-cordillera. It is a transitional zone between the Andean highlands and the eastern forests. Like the surrounding areas, the Yungas belong to the Neotropical realm; the climate is quite rainy, humid, and warm.

== History ==
During the Inca Empire, the term yunga referred to both the western and eastern slopes of the Andes and their inhabitants. In the Spanish colonial era, it became primarily associated with the western foothills near the desert coast and the local Indians. Today, yunga can refer to the lower slopes on both sides of the Andes, though yungas mostly denotes the eastern foothills between the Andes and the Amazon basin, with both having mostly lost their ethnic associations.

== Setting ==
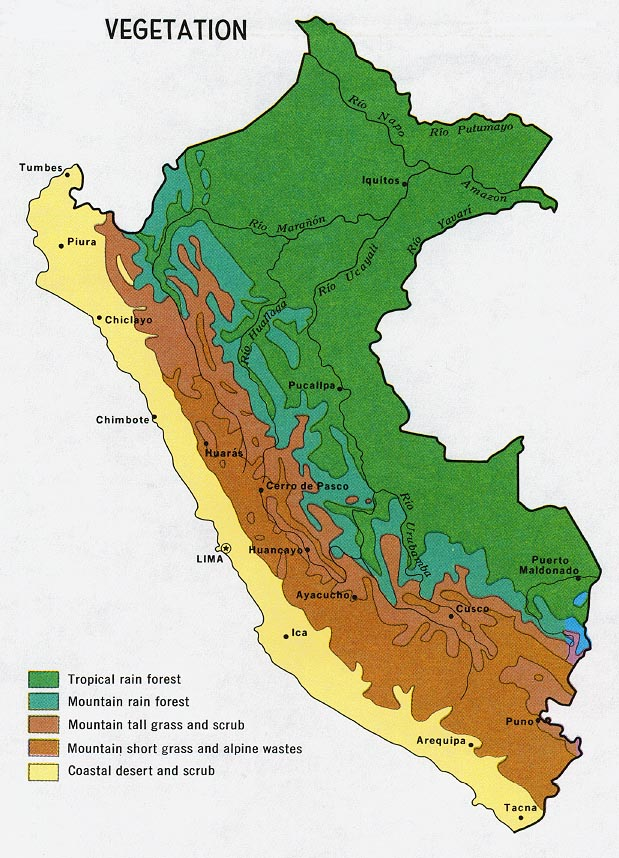
Vegetation map of Peru. The Yungas is marked as "Mountain rain forest" in blue.

The Yungas forests are extremely diverse, ranging from moist lowland forest to evergreen montane forest and cloud forests. The terrain, formed by valleys, fluvial mountain trails and streams, is extremely rugged and varied, contributing to the ecological diversity and richness. A complex mosaic of habitats occur with changing latitude as well as elevation. There are high levels of biodiversity and species endemism throughout the Yungas regions. Many of the forests are evergreen, and the South Andean Yungas contains what may be the last evergreen forests resulting from Quaternary glaciations.

=== World Wildlife ecoregions ===
The World Wide Fund for Nature has delineated three yungas ecoregions along the eastern side of the Andes:

- The northernmost is the Peruvian Yungas, located entirely within Peru and stretching nearly the whole length of the country.
- The Bolivian Yungas lies to the south, entirely within Bolivia. The Cordillera Apolobamba marks the boundary between the Peruvian Yungas and Bolivian Yungas.
- The Southern Andean Yungas begins in southern Bolivia and continues to the north of Argentina. It is a humid forest region between the drier Gran Chaco region to the east and the dry, high altitude Puna region to the west.

Yungas are transitional zones between the Andean highlands and the eastern forests. The yungas forests are extremely diverse, ranging from moist lowland forest to evergreen montane forest and cloud forests. The terrain is extremely rugged and varied, contributing to the ecological diversity and richness. A complex mosaic of habitats occur with changing latitude as well as elevation. There are high levels of biodiversity and species endemism throughout the yungas regions. Many of the forests are evergreen, and the South Andean Yungas contains what may be the last evergreen forests resulting from Quaternary glaciations.

=== Climate ===
The average temperature is 72 °F (22 °C). The climate is varied and ranges from a humid tropical to the cold of the Andes over 10,000 ft (3,000 m).

== Peruvian Yungas ==
In Peru there is a difference between Yunga and Yungas. Yunga is considered a natural region on both sides of the Peruvian Andes, the western side towards the coast is called Sea Yunga, and the eastern side into the jungle is called Fluvial Yunga, both reach a height of 2,300 m.

Instead, Yungas is the ecoregion of rain forest and montane forest from 1.000 to 3.500 m, so it is limited to the eastern side of the Andes. This concept has a closer analogy with the Bolivian Yungas. This region is considered as the most endemic biodiversity of Peru.

Forest loss in the Peruvian Yungas has sharply accelerated since the 2000s, rising seven-fold between 2005 and late 2012, according to satellite analysis by Terra-i.

=== Sea Yunga ===
Sea Yunga, or Maritime Yunga, is found between 500 and 2,300 m and it is situated between the eastern part of the coastal strip and the western part of the Highlands. This subregion has a subtropical desert climate with little rainfall along the central and southern coast (drier as you go south). The average year round day temperature is 21 °C (70 °F) (max 33 °C min 8 °C). A mist-fed ecosystem called Lomas is found at scattered locations among hills near the Pacific Ocean at elevations up to 1,000 metres (3,300 ft).

The flora in the central Sea Yungas region is mainly composed by the lucuma and cherimoya trees, the casuarin, and others.

Once you go north its climate becomes subtropical in the vicinity of La Libertad, Lambayeque and Piura. Day time temperatures average between 21 °C (70 °F) and 25 °C (77 °F) depending on latitude (max 40 °C min 15 °C).

As this area approaches the tropics, fauna differs from the rest of the coast, so that animals like the boas, larger reptiles and the famous white-winged guan (a bird species unique to this Peruvian ecoregion) occur here. Common trees in this area are the faique, the sapote, the zapayal, the barrigon and other thorny tropical savanna trees of the equatorial dry forests on the northern coast of Piura and Tumbes.

The cooler Pacific side is more vaguely characterized. The dry and cool Yunga Coastal begins at 500 m above sea level. The Maritime Yunga begins dry, and it seems to follow ecotone on ecotone until reaching the Quechua region at the Pacific side.

=== Fluvial Yunga ===
Fluvial Yunga is between the altitudes of 1,000 metres (3,300 ft) and 2,300 metres (7,500 ft) and is found on the eastern part of Peru. This sub-region has a subtropical climate with ample seasonal rains. The average temperature fluctuates between 20 °C and 25 °C depending on the altitude (max 35 °C, min 11 °C).

Concept:

The concept of the east side of the continental divide is straightforward: 1,000 m above sea level it is 4.9 °C cooler, and the subtropical cloud forest (Fluvial Yunga) follows the tropical rainforest (Anti). At 2,300 m, the climate transitions from subtropical climate to temperate climate (Quechua). The Tree line ends at 3,500 m and has an annual mean temperature of 10 °C. The region between the tree line and 4,000 m is called Suni or Jalca. Suni is a dry and cold region with many glacial valleys. Despite the harsh weather, crops such as quinoa, maca, qañiwa, broad beans and ulluku are cultivated here.

==== Flora and fauna ====
The flora of the Yunga region is mainly composed of the Peruvian pepper tree, the Furcraea, white cabuya (Furcraea andina), the pitahaya and the Peruvian torch cactus (Echinopsis peruviana). The coca leaf is widely established in this region as well as the uña de gato ("cat's claw", Uncaria tomentosa) plant. The most attractive sites of this region are its many orchid forests and valleys. The fauna in the Yunga region is characterized by the long-tailed mockingbird, or chaucato.

=== Overview ===
Andean Continental Divide

Westside	Eastside
Chala, dry coast	Lowland tropical rainforest or Selva baja
Maritime Yunga	Highland tropical rainforest or Selva alta
Maritime Yunga	Subtropical cloud forest or Fluvial Yunga
Quechua – Montane valleys	Quechua – Montane valleys
Tree line	Tree line – about 3,500 m
Suni, scrubs and agriculture	Suni, scrubs and agriculture

Mountain Top:

- Mountain passes – 4,100 m
- Puna grassland
  - Closed vegetation
  - Sporadic vegetation
- Andean-alpine desert
- Snow line – about 5,000 m
- Janca – Rocks, Snow and Ice
- Peak

== Bolivian Yungas ==
=== Human use ===
In the early 20th century, the region was a major source for rubber and quinine. Now, coffee, citrus, and coca are important crops. People cultivate native plants like the canistel or eggfruit tree the lúcuma tree, the cherimoya or chirimoya, the guava or guayabo and the avocado or palta.

The Afro Bolivian community is concentrated here.

Its name derives from the one applied for the same mountain level by those who study the economic system of the prehispanic Andes.

The Yungas also contains one of the most deadly roads in the world, called the "camino de la muerte," or Highway of Death.

Due to the mountainous terrain an entrepreneurial coca harvester created a network of zip lines that permit rapid travel from peak to peak by farmers, referred to locally as flying men or bird men, along with their harvests using "zip line trollies."

== See also ==
- Tropical Andes
- Geography of Bolivia
- Yungas Road, North road: 3,600 to 4,650 m (La Cumbre pass, Bolivia), then to 330 m in 61–69 km
- Peruvian Amazon
- Natural regions of Peru
- Climate zones by altitude
- Altitudinal zonation

== Other sources ==
- Endemic Bird Areas for the Bolivian and Peruvian upper yungas and the Bolivian and Peruvian lower yungas. BirdLife International, 2003. BirdLife's online World Bird Database. Version 2.0. Cambridge, UK.
- "Peruvian Yungas". Terrestrial Ecoregions. World Wildlife Fund.
- "Bolivian Yungas". Terrestrial Ecoregions. World Wildlife Fund.
- "South Andean Yungas". Terrestrial Ecoregions. World Wildlife Fund.
