= Altitudinal zonation =

Natural layering of ecosystems by elevation

Altitudinal zonation (or elevational zonation) in mountainous regions describes the natural layering of ecosystems that occurs at distinct elevations due to varying environmental conditions. Temperature, humidity, soil composition, and solar radiation are important factors in determining altitudinal zones, which consequently support different vegetation and animal species. Altitudinal zonation was first hypothesized by geographer Alexander von Humboldt who noticed that temperature drops with increasing elevation. Zonation also occurs in intertidal and marine environments, as well as on shorelines and in wetlands. Scientist C. Hart Merriam observed that changes in vegetation and animals in altitudinal zones map onto changes expected with increased latitude in his concept of life zones. Today, altitudinal zonation represents a core concept in mountain research.

== Factors ==
Heating of solids, sunlight and shade in different altitudinal zones (Northern hemisphere)

A variety of environmental factors determines the boundaries of altitudinal zones found on mountains, ranging from direct effects of temperature and precipitation to indirect characteristics of the mountain itself, as well as biological interactions of the species. The cause of zonation is complex, due to many possible interactions and overlapping species ranges. Careful measurements and statistical tests are required to prove the existence of discrete communities along an elevation gradient, as opposed to uncorrelated species ranges.

=== Temperature ===
Decreasing air temperature usually coincides with increasing elevation, which directly influences the length of the growing season at different elevations of the mountain. For mountains located in deserts, extreme high temperatures also limit the ability of large deciduous or coniferous trees to grow near the base of mountains. In addition, plants can be especially sensitive to soil temperatures and can have specific elevation ranges that support healthy growth.

=== Humidity ===
The humidity of certain zones, including precipitation levels, atmospheric humidity, and potential for evapotranspiration, varies with elevation and is a significant factor in determining altitudinal zonation. The most important variable is precipitation at various elevations. As warm, moist air rises up the windward side of a mountain, the air temperature cools and loses its capacity to hold moisture. Thus, the greatest amount of rainfall is expected at mid-altitudes and can support deciduous forest development. Above a certain elevation the rising air becomes too dry and cold, and thus discourages tree growth. Even though rainfall may not be a significant factor for some mountains, atmospheric humidity or aridity can be more important climatic stresses that affect altitudinal zones. Both overall levels of precipitation and humidity influence soil moisture as well. One of the most important factors that control the lower boundary of the Encinal or forest level is the ratio of evaporation to soil moisture.

=== Soil composition ===
The nutrient content of soils at different elevations further complicates the demarcation of altitudinal zones. Soils with higher nutrient content, due to higher decomposition rates or greater weathering of rocks, better support larger trees and vegetation. The elevation of better soils varies with the particular mountain being studied. For example, for mountains found in the tropical rainforest regions, lower elevations exhibit fewer terrestrial species because of the thick layer of dead fallen leaves covering the forest floor. At this latitude more acidic, humose soils exist at higher elevations in the montane or subalpine levels. In a different example, weathering is hampered by low temperatures at higher elevations in the Rocky Mountain of the western United States, resulting in thin coarse soils.

=== Biological forces ===
In addition to physical forces, biological forces may also produce zonation. For example, a strong competitor can force weaker competitors to higher or lower positions on the elevation gradient. The importance of competition is difficult to assess without experiments, which are expensive and often take many years to complete. However, there is an accumulating body of evidence that competitively dominant plants may seize the preferred locations (warmer sites or deeper soils). Two other biological factors can influence zonation: grazing and mutualism. The relative importance of these factors is also difficult to assess, but the abundance of grazing animals, and the abundance of mycorrhizal associations, suggests that these elements may influence plant distributions in significant ways.

=== Solar radiation ===
Light is another significant factor in the growth of trees and other photosynthetic vegetation. The Earth's atmosphere is filled with water vapor, particulate matter, and gases that filter the radiation coming from the Sun before reaching the Earth's surface. Hence, the summits of mountains and higher elevations receive much more intense radiation than the basal plains. Along with the expected arid conditions at higher elevations, shrubs and grasses tend to thrive because of their small leaves and extensive root systems. However, high elevations also tend to have more frequent cloud cover, which compensates for some of the high intensity radiation.

=== Massenerhebung effect ===
The physical characteristics and relative location of the mountain itself must also be considered in predicting altitudinal zonation patterns. The Massenerhebung effect describes variation in the tree line based on mountain size and location: mountains surrounded by large ranges will tend to have higher tree lines than more isolated mountains due to heat retention and wind shadowing. This effect predicts that zonation of rain forests on lower mountains may mirror the zonation expected on high mountains, but the belts occur at lower elevations. A similar effect is exhibited in the Santa Catalina Mountains of Arizona, where the basal elevation and the total elevation influence the elevation of vertical zones of vegetation.

=== Other factors ===
In addition to the factors described above, there are a host of other properties that can confound predictions of altitudinal zonations. These include: frequency of disturbance (such as fire or monsoons), wind velocity, type of rock, topography, nearness to streams or rivers, history of tectonic activity, and latitude.

== Elevation levels ==
Altitudinal zonation in the Alps

Elevation models of zonation are complicated by factors discussed above and thus the relative elevations each zone begins and ends is not tied to a specific elevation. However it is possible to split the altitudinal gradient into five main zones used by ecologists under varying names. In some cases these level follow each other with the decrease in elevation, which is called vegetation inversion.

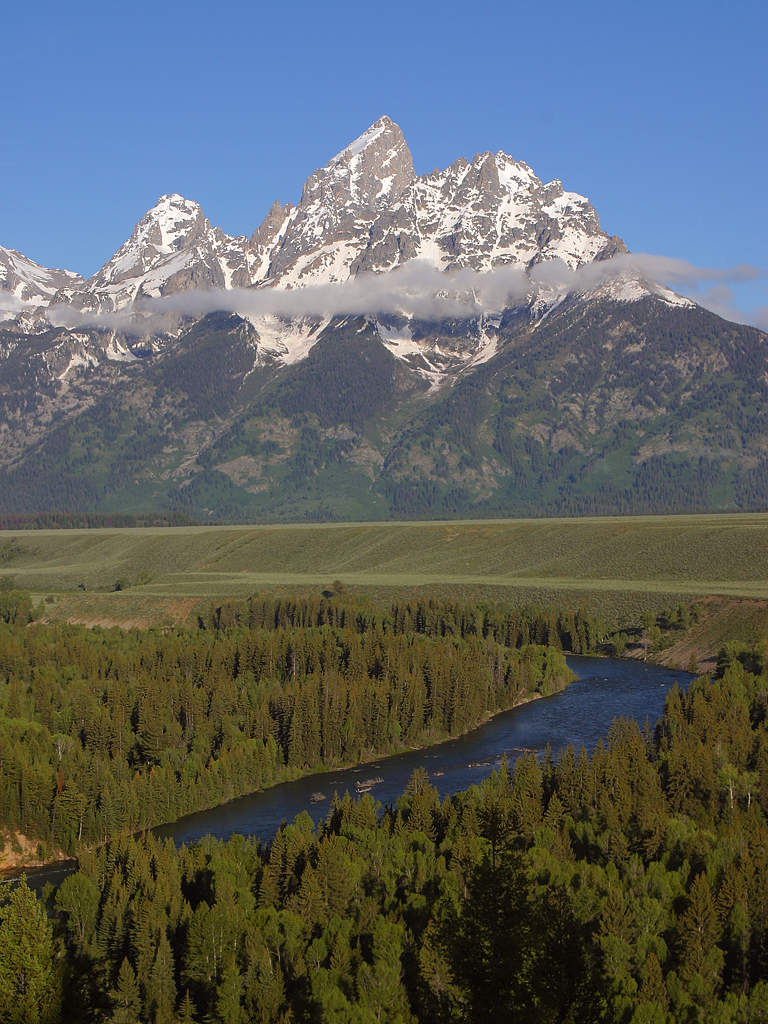
Altitudinal zonation of Grand Teton in the Rocky Mountains (note change in vegetation as elevation increases)

- Nival level (glaciers): Covered in snow throughout most of the year. Vegetation is extremely limited to only a few species that thrive on silica soils.
- Alpine level: The zone that stretches between the tree line and snowline. This zone is further broken down into Sub-Nival and Treeless Alpine (in the tropics-Tierra fria; low-alpine)
  - Sub-nival: The highest zone that vegetation typically exists. This area is shaped by the frequent frosts that restrict extensive plant colonization. Vegetation is patchy and is restricted to only the most favorable locations that are protected from the heavy winds that often characterize this area. Much of this region is patchy grassland, sedges and rush heaths typical of arctic zones. Snow is found in this region for part of the year.
  - Treeless alpine (low-alpine): Characterized by a closed carpet of vegetation that includes alpine meadows, shrubs and sporadic dwarfed trees. Because of the complete cover of vegetation, frost has less of an effect on this region, but due to the consistent freezing temperatures tree growth is severely limited.
- Montane level: Extends from the mid-elevation forests to the tree line. The exact level of the tree line varies with local climate, but typically the tree line is found where mean monthly soil temperatures never exceed 10.0 degrees C and the mean annual soil temperatures are around 6.7 degrees C. In the tropics, this region is typified by montane rain forest (above 3,000 ft) while at higher latitudes coniferous forests often dominate.

- Lowland layer: This lowest section of mountains varies distinctly across climates and is referred to by a wide range of names depending on the surrounding landscape. Colline zones are found in tropical regions and Encinal zones and desert grasslands are found in desert regions.
  - Colline: Characterized by deciduous forests when in oceanic or moderately continental areas, and characterized by grassland in more continental regions. Extends from sea level to about 3,000 feet (roughly 900 m). Vegetation is abundant and dense.
  - Encinal: Characterized by open evergreen oak forests and most common in desert regions. Evaporation and soil moisture control limitation of which encinal environments can thrive. Desert grasslands lie below encinal zones. Very commonly found in the Southwestern United States.
  - Desert grassland: Characterized by varying densities of low lying vegetation, grasslands zones cannot support trees due to extreme aridity. Some desert regions may support trees at base of mountains however, and thus distinct grasslands zones will not form in these areas.

For detailed breakdowns of the characteristics of altitudinal zones found on different mountains, see List of life zones by region.

=== Treeline ===
The most decisive biogeographic and climatic boundary along elevation gradients is the climatic high-elevation treeline. The treeline separates the montane from the alpine zone and marks the potential for tree growth, irrespective of whether trees are present or not. So when trees had been cut or burnt, and thus, are absent from the treeline, it is still in place as defined by the treeline isotherm. At the tree line, tree growth is often sparse, stunted, and deformed by wind and cold krummholz (German for "crooked wood"). The tree line often appears well-defined, but it can be a more gradual transition. Trees grow shorter and often at lower densities as they approach tree line, above which they cease to exist.

== Animal zonation ==
Animals also exhibit zonation patterns in concert with the vegetational zones described above. Invertebrates are more clearly defined into zones because they are typically less mobile than vertebrate species. Vertebrate animals often span across altitudinal zones according to the seasons and food availability. Typically animal species diversity and abundance decrease as a function of elevation above the montane zone because of the harsher environmental conditions experienced at higher elevations. Fewer studies have explored animal zonation with elevation because this correlation is less defined than the vegetation zones due to the increased mobility of animal species.

== Land-use planning and human utilization ==
The variability of both natural and human environments has made it difficult to construct universal models to explain human cultivation in altitudinal environments. With more established roads however, the bridge between different cultures has started to shrink. Mountainous environments have become more accessible and diffusion of ideas, technology, and goods occur with more regularity. Nonetheless, altitudinal zonation caters to agricultural specialization and growing populations cause environmental degradation.

=== Agriculture ===
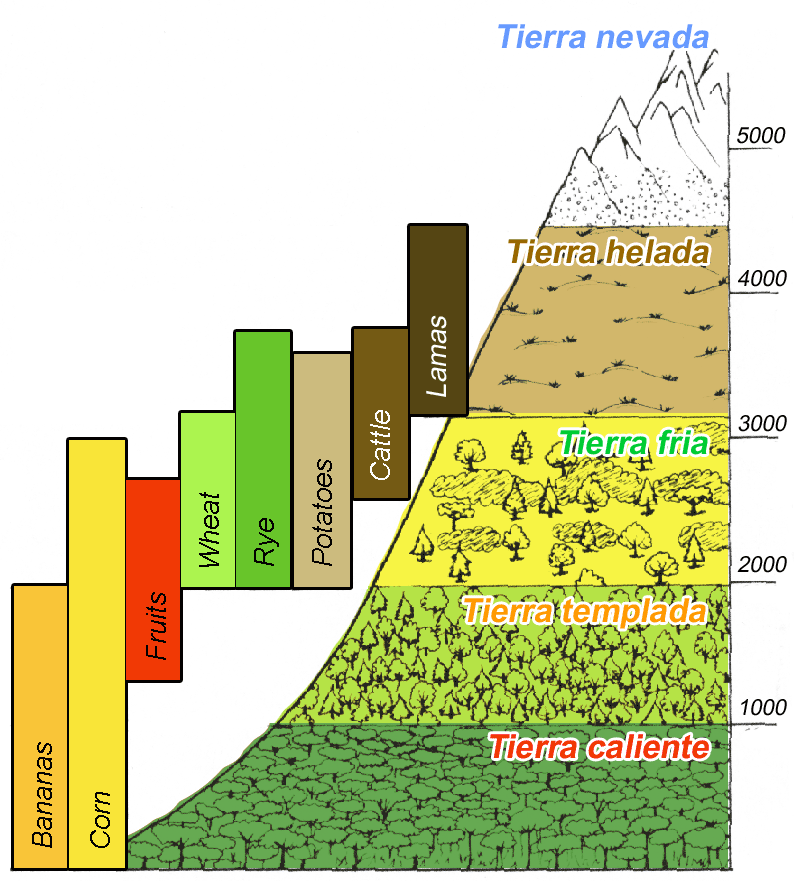
Altitudinal zones of Andes Mountains and corresponding communities of agriculture and livestock raised

Human populations have developed agricultural production strategies to exploit varying characteristics of altitudinal zones. Elevation, climate, and soil fertility set upper limits on types of crops that can reside in each zone. Populations residing in the Andes Mountain region of South America have taken advantage of varying altitudinal environments to raise a wide variety of different crops. Two different types of adaptive strategies have been adopted within mountainous communities.

- Generalized Strategy – exploits a series of microniches or ecozones at several elevational levels
- Specialized Strategy – focuses on a single zone and specializes in the agricultural activities suitable to that elevation, developing elaborate trade relationships with external populations

With improved accessibility to new farming techniques, populations are adopting more specialized strategies and moving away from generalized strategies. Many farming communities now choose to trade with communities at different elevations instead of cultivating every resource on their own because it is cheaper and easier to specialize within their altitudinal zone.

=== Environmental degradation ===
Population growth is leading to environmental degradation in altitudinal environments through deforestation and overgrazing. The increase in accessibility of mountainous regions allows more people to travel between areas and encourage groups to expand commercial land use. Furthermore, the new linkage between mountainous and lowland populations from improved road access has contributed to worsening environmental degradation.

== Debate on continuum versus zonation ==
Not all mountainous environments exhibit sudden changes in altitudinal zones. Though less common, some tropical environments show a slow continuous change in vegetation over the altitudinal gradient and thus do not form distinct vegetation zones.

== See also ==
- Biome
- Habitat
- Montane ecosystem

=== Examples ===
- Life zones of central Europe
- Life zones of the Great Basin of North America
- Life zones of the Mediterranean region
- Life zones of the North Cascades in the Pacific Northwest of America
- Life zones of the Sierra Nevada in California
- Life zones of Peru
