= Central Andean wet puna =

Ecoregion in South America

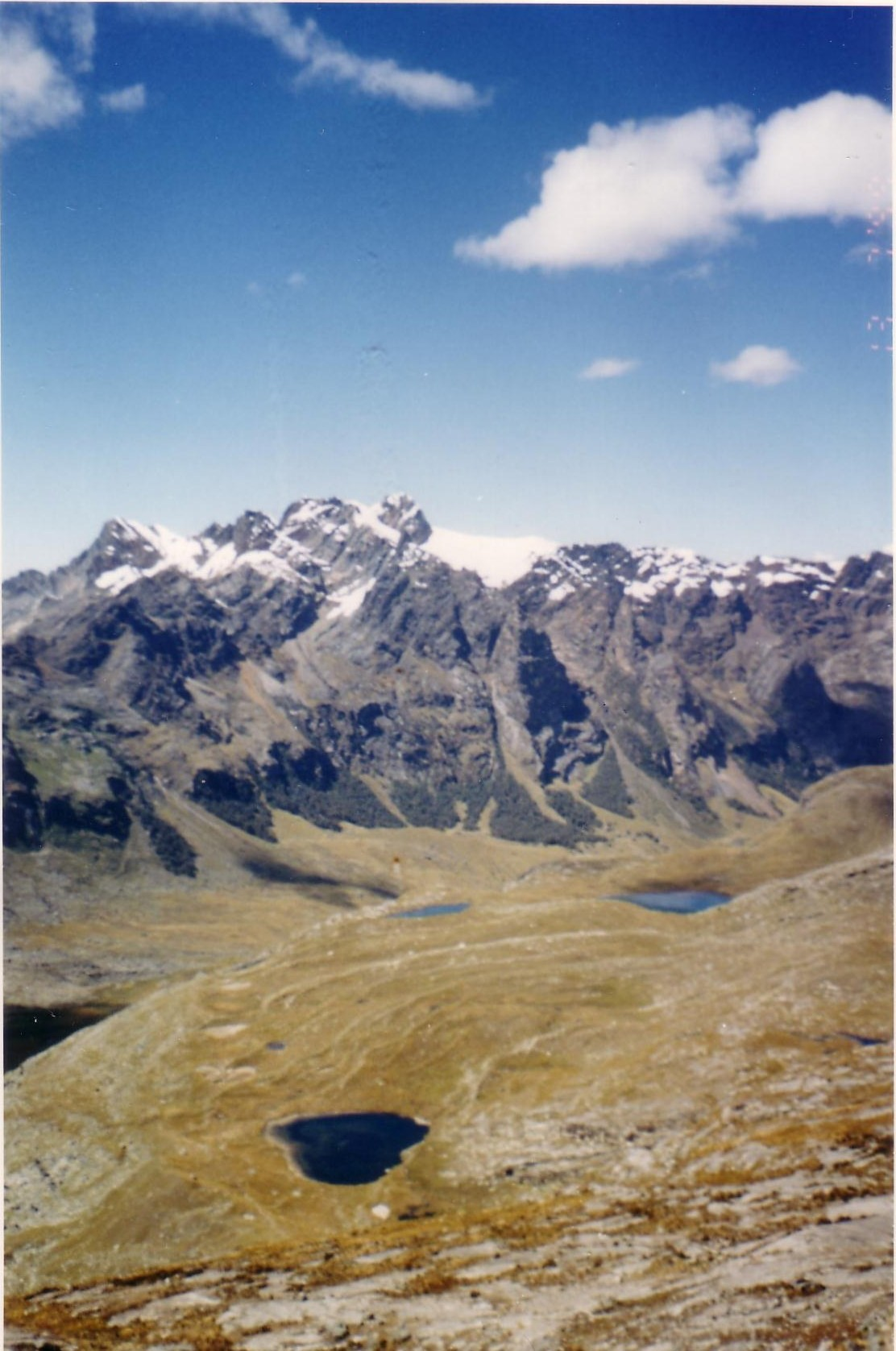
- Huascarán National Park

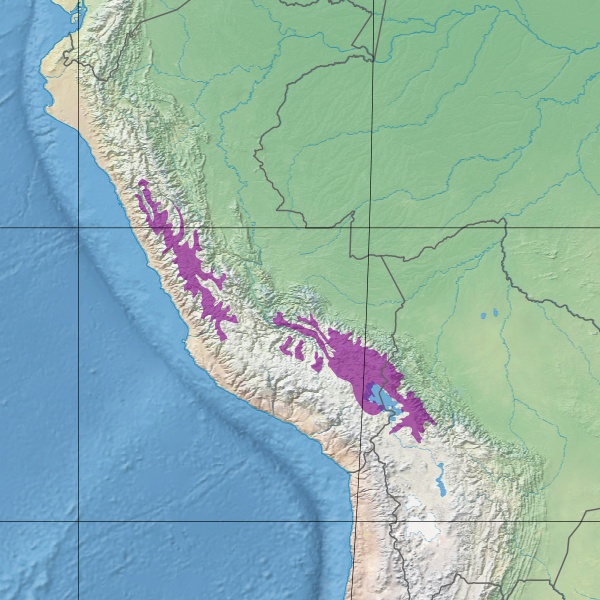
- Ecoregion territory (in purple)

Ecology
- Realm: Neotropic
- Biome: Montane grasslands and shrublands
- Borders: List: Sechura Desert; Cordillera Central páramo; Central Andean puna; Central Andean dry puna; Bolivian montane dry forests; Bolivian Yungas; Peruvian Yungas

Geography
- Area: 117,300 km^{2} (45,300 mi^{2})
- Countries: Peru; Bolivia

The Central Andean wet puna is a montane grasslands and shrublands ecoregion in the Andes of Peru and Bolivia.

== Setting ==
This ecoregion occurs above 3,500 metres (11,500 ft) and consists of high-elevation, wet, montane grasslands amid lakes, plateaus, valleys, and high mountains. It is bordered on the west by the Sechura Desert and on the east by the Peruvian Yungas. To the north it transitions to the Cordillera Central páramo, to the south, the Central Andean puna.

The ecoregion can be subdivided into three subregions: the high andean puna, wet puna, and wet montane grassland.

The high Andean puna lies between 4,200 and 5,000 metres (13,800 and 16,400 ft). Nightly freezes occur throughout the year and annual precipitation is less than 700 millimetres (28 in), falling mainly as snow and hail.

The wet puna is located in the altiplano at elevations between 3,700 and 4,200 metres (12,100 and 13,800 ft). It is wetter in the north, where the wet season lasts eight months, and drier in the south, where the wet season lasts two months. Precipitation ranges from 500 to 700 millimetres (20 to 28 in) per year. Night freezes occur from March to October.

The wet montane grasslands occur in the eastern section of the ecoregion, at elevations between 3,800 and 4,200 metres (12,500 and 13,800 ft). They form in deep mountain valleys with glacial origins. They are more humid than the puna.

== Climate ==
The climate varies between cold semi-arid and subtropical highland.

== Flora ==
The vegetation is composed of bunchgrass communities, wetlands, small shrubs and trees, and herbaceous plants.

Conspicuous grass genera include: Agrostis, Calamagrostis, Festuca, Paspalum and Stipa; in more humid areas Chusquea and Cortaderia.

Asteraceae include Azorella, Baccharis, Daucus, Draba, Echinopsis, Gentiana, Geranium, Lupinus, Nototriche, Plettekea, Valeriana and Werneria.

Brassicaceae include Cardamine, Draba, and Weberbauera.

Campanulaceae include Lysipomia.

Caryophyllaceae include Arenaria, Cerstium, and Pycnophyllum.

Rosaceae include Acaena, Alchemilla, and Potentilla.

Rubiaceae include Arcytophyllum, and Galium.

Scrophulariaceae include Agalinis, Bartsia, and Calceolaria.

The high Andean puna includes species of grasses such as Festuca dolichopylla, Stipa ichu, Calamagrostis spp. Other plants with prostrate and roseate life forms are Alchemilla (syn. Lachemilla) spp., Hypochaeris spp., Pycnophyllum spp., Azorella spp., and Aciachne pulvinata.

The wet puna is composed mostly of grasses and shrubs, with sedges and rushes in areas with poor drainage. Below 4,000 metres (13,000 ft), vegetation in wet areas includes Carex, Juncus, Oreobolus and Scirpus. Above 4,000 metres (13,000 ft), the vegetation in wet areas (called bofedales) includes floating submerged cushion plants. Large cushions are formed by Distichia muscoides, Oxychloe andina, and Plantago rigida. Other genera include Gentiana, Hypsela, Isoetes, Lilaeopsis, Ourisia, and Scirpus. Common trees are Buddleja coriacea and Polylepis spp. Puya raimondii is a giant rosette found here.

The wet montane grasslands in the region possess species not found in the wet puna. These include Gnaphalium spp. Blechnum loxense, Loricaria sp., and Achirocline sp.

== Fauna ==
All of the Andean camelids are found in this ecoregion, including the vicuña (Vicugna vicugna), llama (Lama glama), guanaco (Lama guanacoe), and alpaca (Lama pacos). Other large mammals include the puma (Felis concolor) and the andean fox (Pseudalopex culpaeus). Bats include the small big-eared brown bat (Histiotus montanus) and the hoary bat (Lasiurus cinereus).

Endemic bird species in the northern section of the ecoregion include the Ash-breasted tit-tyrant (Anairetes alpinus), the royal cinclodes (Cinclodes aricomae), Berlepsch’s canastero (Asthenes berlepschi), the line-fronted canastero (Asthenes urubambensis), the olivaceous thornbill (Chalcostigma olivaceum), the scribble-tailed canastero (Asthenes maculicauda), the short-tailed finch (Idiopsar bracyurus), and the gray-bellied flower-piercer (Diglosa carbonaria).

Endemic bird species found in the southern section of the ecoregion tend to live in dense montane scrub and shrubby forest with cacti. Most of these birds live in the puna region, but others live in subtropical and temperate zones. These include the plain-tailed warbling-finch (Poospiza alticola), the rufous-breasted warbling-finch (Poospiza rubecula), Taczanowski’s tinamou (Nothoprocta tacaznowskii), the white-cheeked cotinga (Zaratornis stresemanni), Kalinowski’s tinamou (Nothoprocta kalinowskii), the white-browed tit-spinetail (Leptasthenura xenothorax), the rufous-eared brush-finch (Atlapetes rufigenis), the white-tufted sunbeam (Aglaeactis castelnaudii), the bearded mountaineer (Oreonympha nobilis), the striated earthcreeper (Upucerthia serrana), the rusty-fronted canastero (Asthenes ottonis), the rusty-bellied brush-finch (Atlapetes nationi), the chesnut-breasted mountain-finch (Poospiza caesar), and the brown-flanked tanager (Thlypopsis pectoralis).

The southern section of the ecoregion includes the Cochabamba mountain-finch (Poospiza garleppi), Berlepsch’s canastero (Asthenes berlepschi), the maquis canastero (Astenes heterura), the rufous-bellied saltator (Saltator rufiventris), the citron-headed yellow-finch (Sicalis luteocephala), the scribble-tailed canastero (Asthenes maculicauda), the short-tailed finch (Idiopsar brachyurus), the grey-bellied flower-piecer (Diglossa carbonaria), and Berlepsch's canastero (Asthenes berlepschi).

== Natural areas ==
- Ulla Ulla National Reserve
- Titicaca National Reserve
- Nor Yauyos-Cochas Landscape Reserve
- Historic Sanctuary of Machu Picchu
- Huayhuash mountain range
- Junín National Reserve
- Huascarán National Park
