= Central Andean dry puna =

Ecoregion in South America

Central Andean dry puna (NT1001)
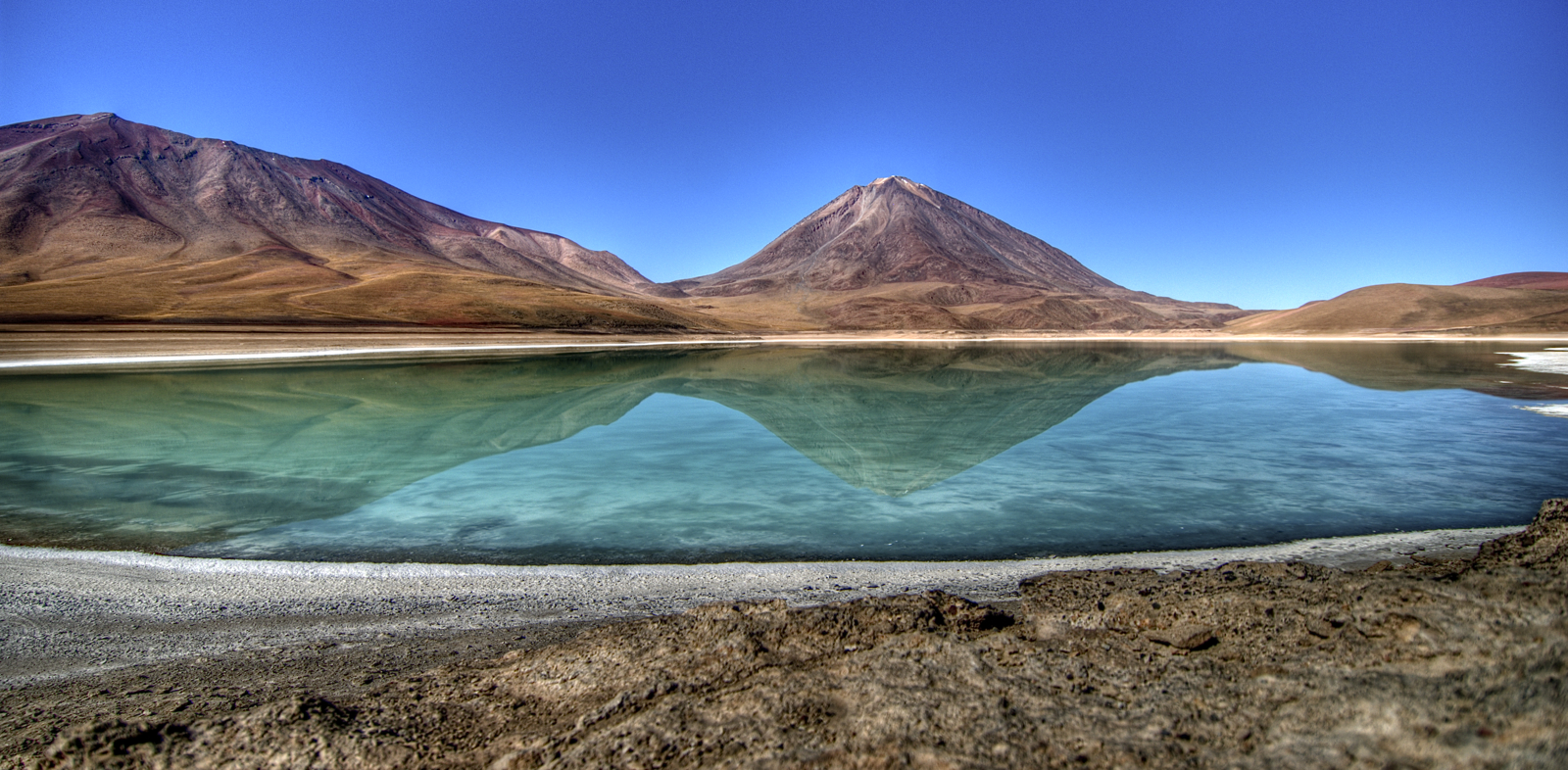
- Laguna Verde, Bolivia

- Location in central South America

Ecology
- Realm: Neotropical
- Biome: montane grasslands and shrublands
- Borders: List: Sechura Desert; Atacama Desert; Chilean matorral; Southern Andean steppe; Central Andean puna; Central Andean wet puna; Bolivian montane dry forests

Geography
- Area: 307,430 km^{2} (118,700 sq mi)
- Countries: Argentina, Bolivia, Chile
- Coordinates: 21.0000°S 68.0000°W
- Rivers: Desaguadero River, Lauca River, Río Grande de Lipez,

Conservation
- Conservation status: Relatively stable/intact
- Protected: 15.3%

The Central Andean dry puna (NT1001) is an ecoregion in the montane grasslands and shrublands biome, located in the Andean Altiplano (high plateau) in South America. It is a part of the Puna grassland.

== Setting ==
This ecoregion occupies the southwestern portion of the Altiplano and is located east of the Atacama Desert.

Salt flats, locally known as Salares, are a characteristic feature of this ecoregion. Among the largest salares are Coipasa, Uyuni, Atacama, and Arizaro. Other major geographical features are the lakes Poopó and Coipasa, and the many volcanoes that tower over the altiplano, including Parinacota, Nevado Sajama, Tata Sabaya, Ollagüe, Licancabur, Lascar, Aracar, Socompa and Llullaillaco. In addition, numerous and colorful small lakes and ponds dot this region. These are seasonal as well as permanent, and have different degrees of salinity.

In December 2023, scientists, for the first time, reported a recently discovered area on the current planet Earth, particularly in the territory of Puna de Atacama, which may be similar to ancient Earth, and the related environment of the first life forms on Earth - as well as - similar to possibly hospitable conditions on the planet Mars during earlier Martian times.

== Climate ==
This ecoregion has a dry climate ranging from cold steppe to cold desert.

== Flora ==
Grasslands are dominated by species of the genera Stipa and Festuca. Typical high Andean wetlands are the Bofedales. These marshy areas are characterized by the presence of cushion bog vegetation. The Yareta grows in well-drained soils.

Central Andean dry puna is home to Polylepis species, including the Polylepis tarapacana, which is the woody plant that grows at the highest elevations in the world.

The genera Menonvillea, Nototriche, Pycnophyllum, and Werneria are characteristic of the dry puna.

== Fauna ==
Camelids, such as llamas, alpacas, & vicuñas, are found in this ecoregion. Other mammals include the cougar, Andean mountain cat, Andean fox, and the Andean hairy armadillo.

Three of the flamingo species inhabit here. They are Andean flamingo, James's flamingo, and Chilean flamingo. Other remarkable birds are the Darwin's rhea, Andean condor, puna tinamou, puna teal, puna ibis & the Andean goose.

== Population and conservation ==
15.3% of the ecoregion is in protected areas. Those include:

- Eduardo Avaroa Andean Fauna National Reserve
- Lauca National Park
- Las Vicuñas National Reserve
- Llica National Park
- Llullaillaco National Park
- Los Flamencos National Reserve
- Nevado Tres Cruces National Park
- Olaroz-Cauchari Flora and Fauna Reserve
- Sajama National Park
- Salar del Huasco National Park
- Volcan Isluga National Park
- Yura National Park
