= Sechura Desert =

Desert along the coast of Peru

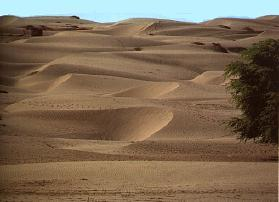
- Landscape of the Sechura Desert

- Map of the region

Ecology
- Realm: Neotropical
- Biome: deserts and xeric shrublands
- Borders: List: Atacama Desert; Central Andean dry puna; Central Andean puna; Central Andean wet puna; Cordillera Central páramo; Peruvian Yungas; Tumbes–Piura dry forests
- Mammal species: Sechuran fox

Geography
- Area: 5,000 km^{2} (1,900 sq mi)
- Country: Peru
- Coordinates: 5°45′S 80°30′W

The Sechura Desert is a coastal desert located south of the Piura Region of Peru along the Pacific coast and inland to the foothills of the Andes Mountains. Its extreme aridity is caused by the upwelling of cold coastal waters and subtropical atmospheric subsidence, but it is also subject to occasional flooding during El Niño years. In 1728, the town of Sechura was destroyed by a tsunami and was later rebuilt in its present location. In 1998, runoff from flooding rivers caused the formation of a temporary lake some 145 km (90 mi) long filling the Bayóvar Depression. Short rivers flowing across the desert from the Andes support intensive irrigation-based agriculture.

== Location and extent ==
Within Peru, the desert is described as the strip along the northern Pacific coast of Peru in the southern Piura and western Lambayeque regions, and extending from the coast 20–100 km (12–62 mi) inland to the secondary ridges of the Andes Mountains. At its northern end near the city of Piura, the Sechura Desert transitions to the Tumbes–Piura dry forests ecoregion. Including much of eastern Lambayeque Region, this habitat is composed of equatorial dry forests. The total area of the Sechura Desert is 5,000 km^{2} (1,931 sq mi).

== History ==
While a desert, the Sechura has been subject to flooding from rivers and to storms driven in from the Pacific Ocean. In 1728, a tsunami generated from an earthquake swept inland, destroying the town of Sechura, then located closer to the water. Survivors moved inland and re-established the town in its current location.

During El Niño years, flooding in the desert regularly occurs. In 1998, the runoff from the flooding rivers poured into the coastal Sechura Desert. Where there had been nothing but arid, hardscrabble waste for 15 years, suddenly, the second-largest lake in Peru had developed: 90 mi (145 km) long, 20 mi (32 km) wide, and 10 ft (3.0 m) deep, with occasional parched domes of sand and clay poking up from the surface.

== Climate ==
The Peruvian Desert has a low range of temperature changes due to the moderating effect of the nearby Pacific Ocean. Because of the upwelling of cold coastal waters and subtropical atmospheric subsidence, the desert is one of the most arid on Earth.

Summer (December through March) is warm and sunny with temperatures above 35 °C (95 °F) during the day, and temperatures that average over 24 °C (75 °F) at night. In the winter (June through September) the weather is cool and cloudy with temperatures that vary from 16 °C (61 °F) at night to 30 °C (86 °F) during the day.

== Geography ==
The Bayóvar Depression, which is the lowest point in Peru and all of the Southern Tropics, is located in this desert.

The numerous short rivers that cross the Sechura supported prehistoric indigenous human settlements for millennia. A number of urban cultures flourished here, including the Moche. The Moche survived on a diet of fish, guinea pigs, camelids, squash, and peanuts. The Sican Culture (circa 800–1300 CE) succeeded the Moche, and developed refined techniques of lost wax goldsmithing.

Today, the rivers support intensive irrigated agriculture on the fertile bottomlands. Two of Peru's five largest cities, including Piura and Chiclayo, lie within the agricultural region in the north.

== See also ==
- List of deserts
- Nazca Lines
- Atacama Desert
- Chala
