= Andicolea scolopendra =

Conservation status
- Vulnerable (IUCN 3.1)

Scientific classification
- Kingdom: Plantae
- Clade: Tracheophytes
- Clade: Angiosperms
- Clade: Eudicots
- Clade: Asterids
- Order: Asterales
- Family: Asteraceae
- Genus: Andicolea
- Species: A. scolopendra

Binomial name
- Andicolea scolopendra (Hook.) Mayta & Molinari (2021)

Synonyms
- Baccharis scolopendra Hook. (1837); Loricaria scolopendra (Hook.) Kuntze (1891); Tafalla scolopendra (Hook.) Mattf. (1929)

Species of flowering plant

Andicolea scolopendra is a species of flowering plant in the family Asteraceae. It is found only in Ecuador. Its natural habitats are subtropical or tropical moist montane forests and subtropical or tropical high-elevation shrubland. It is threatened by habitat loss.
