= Titicaca National Reserve =

Protected area in Peru

- IUCN category VI (protected area with sustainable use of natural resources)
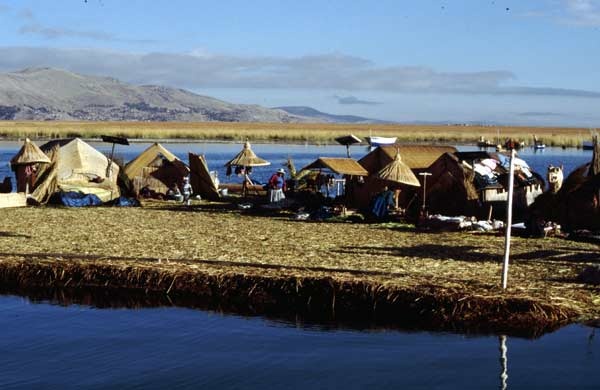
- the Uros floating islands on Lake Titicaca, Puno

- Location within Peru
- Interactive map of Titicaca National Reserve
- Location: Puno Region, Puno Province, Huancané Province, Peru
- Coordinates: 15°50′11″S 69°20′19″W
- Area: 36.180 ha (89.40 acres)

The Titicaca National Reservation is located in the Puno Region, Peru, in the Puno and Huancané provinces. Its main purpose is to preserve the ecosystems and landscapes of the Titicaca lake and surrounding Central Andean wet puna ecoregion.

== See also ==
- Iperu, tourist information and assistance
- Tourism in Peru
