= Southern Andean steppe =

Ecoregion in South America

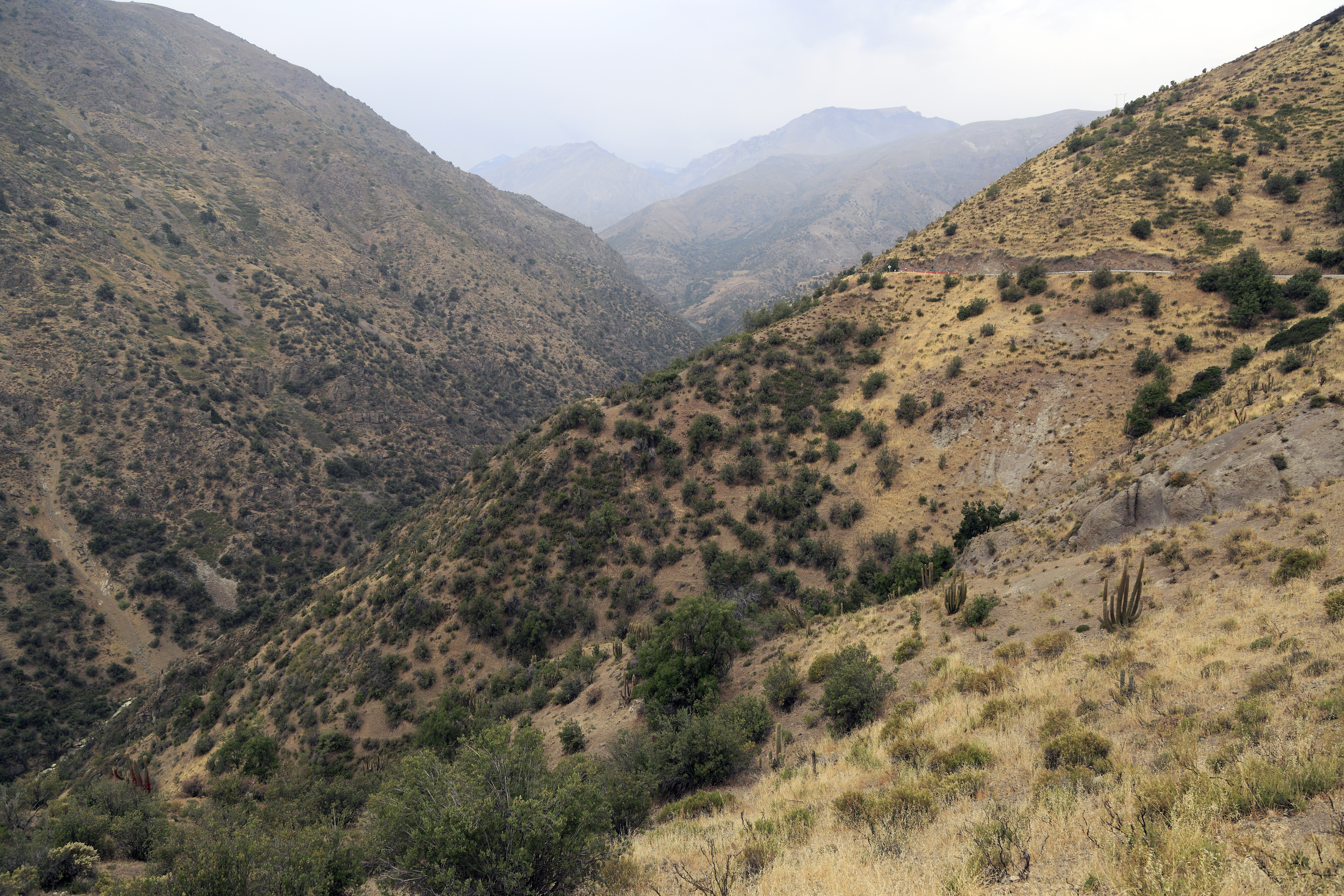
- Lo Barnechea, Chile

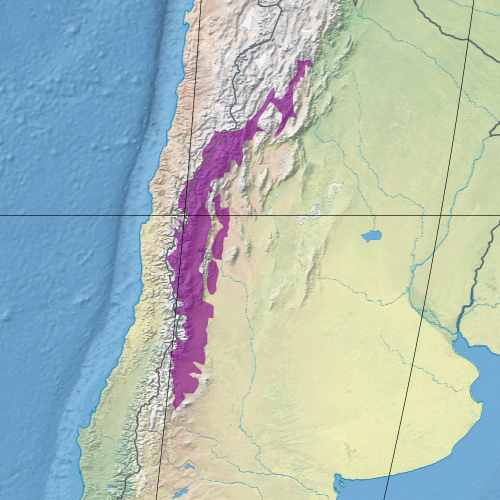
- Ecoregion territory (in purple)

Ecology
- Realm: Neotropical
- Biome: Montane grasslands and shrublands
- Borders: List: Patagonian steppe; Valdivian temperate forests; Chilean matorral; High Monte; Central Andean puna; Central Andean dry puna

Geography
- Area: 178,200 km^{2} (68,800 mi^{2})
- Countries: Chile; Argentina

Conservation
- Protected: 21.165%

The Southern Andean steppe is a montane grasslands and shrublands ecoregion occurring along the border of Chile and Argentina in the high elevations of the southern Andes mountain range.

== Setting ==
This ecoregion is found from 3,500 to 5,000 metres (11,500 to 16,400 ft) in the north to 1,800 to 3,000 metres (5,900 to 9,800 ft) in the south. At higher elevations are found permanent snow, glaciers, and ice fields. At lower elevations, this ecoregion grades into Chilean matorral and Valdivian temperate forests to the west and High Monte to the east. To the north it transitions to the Central Andean dry puna and to the south the Patagonian steppe.

== Climate ==
This ecoregion has a cold desert climate, Köppen climate classification BWk. Precipitation falls mainly in winter.

== Flora ==
The flora of this ecoregion is adapted to its cold, dry, and windy climate. Many of the plant genera have evolved endemic species.

The plants on the western side of this ecoregion can be divided into three zones based on their growth forms and elevation. In the lower elevations, 2,000 to 2,700 metres (6,600 to 8,900 ft), grow large shrubs such as Chuquiraga oppositifolia and Nassauvia axillaris. In intermediate elevations, 2,700 to 3,300 metres (8,900 to 10,800 ft), grow small shrubs, tussock grasses, and cushions. These include Azorella madreporica, Laretia acaulis, and Stipa spp. In the highest elevations, extending to 3,900 metres (12,800 ft), grow small forbs, rosettes, and grasses such as Nassauvia lagascae, Oxalis erythrorhiza, Nassauvia pinnigera and Moschopsis leyboldii.

The plants on the eastern side do not grow in distinct zones. In the lower elevations, 1,900 to 2,700 metres (6,200 to 8,900 ft), grow plants of the genera Stipa, Adesmia, Mulinum, Nassauvia, and Chuquiraga. Higher, from 2,700 to 3,300 metres (8,900 to 10,800 ft), are shrubs and cushion plants of Oxalis, Junellia, Adesmia, Laretia and Azorella. At the highest elevations, 3,300 to 4,500 metres (10,800 to 14,800 ft), grow Senecio, Nassauvia, Chaetanthera, Draba, Barneoudia, Leucheria, and Moschopsis.

== Fauna ==
The fauna is similar to that of the Central Andean dry puna and the Patagonian steppe. Large mammals found here include the puma (Puma concolor), the Andean fox (Lycalopex culpaeus) and the vicuna (Vicugna vicugna) and guanaco (Lama guanicoe).

== Contemporary land use ==
This ecoregion's high elevations and harsh climate make it unsuitable for development or farming, so it has experienced little habitat loss.

== Protected areas ==
21.165% of the ecoregion is in protected areas. Protected areas include:

- Abra del Acay Natural Monument
- Caverna de las Brujas Nature Reserve
- Cerro Aconcagua Provincial Park
- El Leoncito National Park
- El Morado Natural Monument
- Laguna del Diamante Nature Reserve
- Laguna del Laja National Park
- Nevado Tres Cruces National Park
- Puente del Inca Natural Monument
- Río Clarillo National Reserve
- Río de los Cipreses National Reserve
- San Guillermo National Park
- Volcán Tupungato Provincial Park
- Yerba Loca Nature Sanctuary
