= Nicolas-Joseph Thiéry de Menonville =

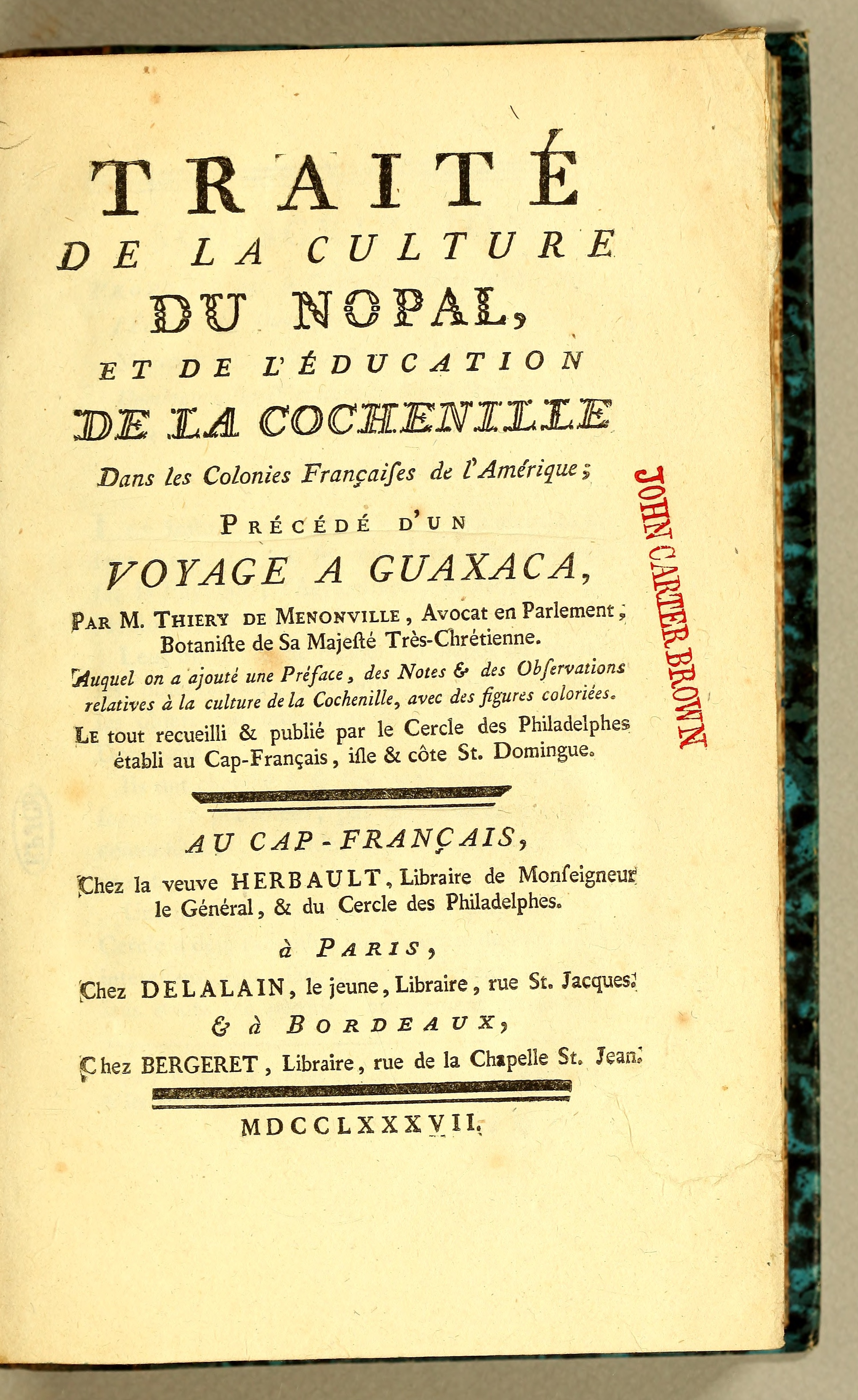
Title page, Traité de la culture du nopal, 1787

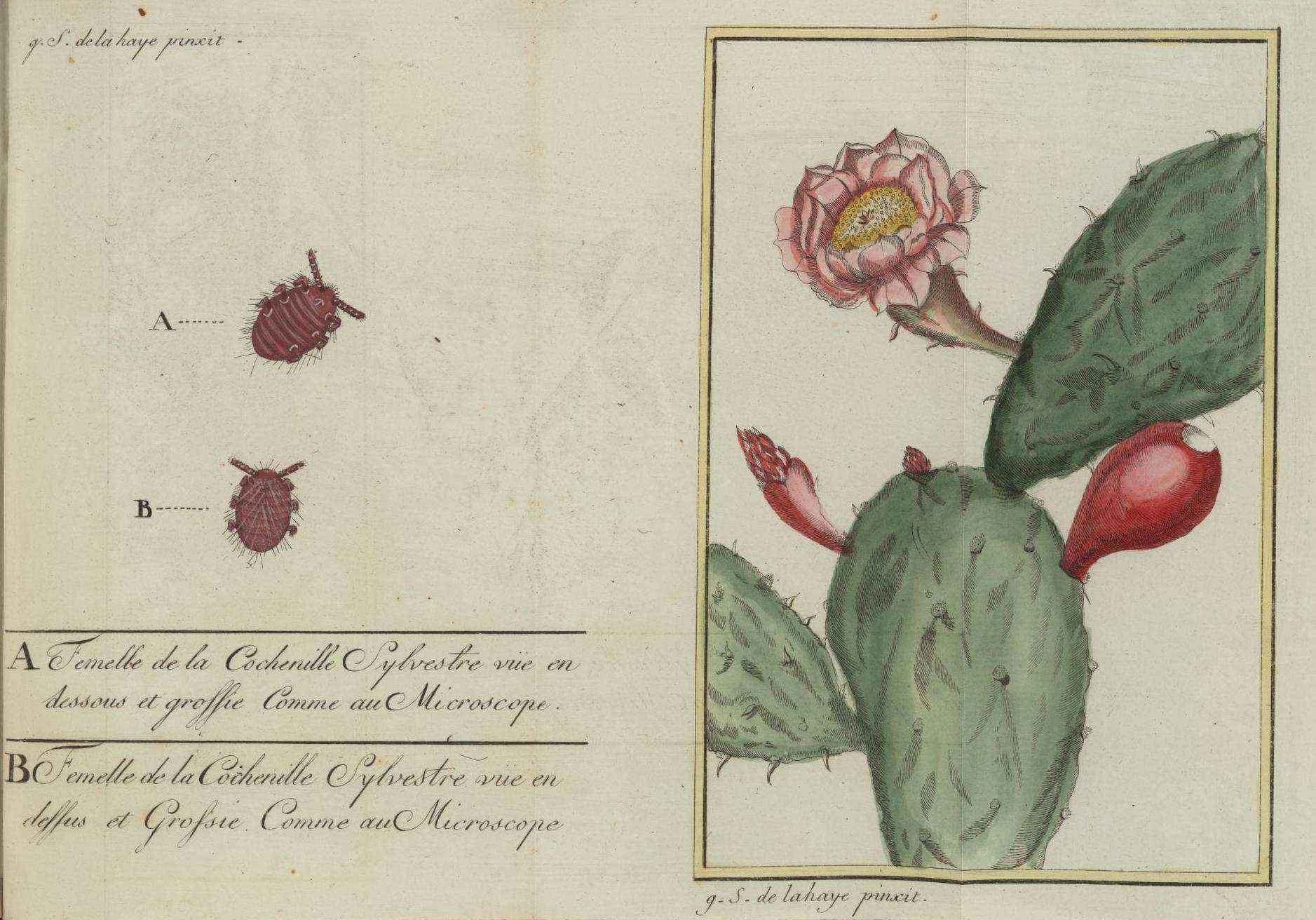
Hand colored engraving of cochineal and nopal in Traité de la culture du nopal, 1787

Nicolas-Joseph Thiéry de Menonville (18 June 1739 in Saint-Mihiel, France – 1780 in Port-au-Prince, Saint-Domingue), avocat at the Parlement of Paris, was a French botanist who volunteered to be sent to Mexico in 1776 to steal the cochineal insect valued for its scarlet dye. In his clandestine biopiracy, he worked without official papers and would have been ruthlessly treated had he been caught. He succeeded in naturalizing the insect and the prickly pear (Opuntia) "nopal" cactus on which it depended in the French colony of Saint-Domingue.

His colorful Voyage à Guaxaca (Oaxaca) narrates his adventure, in which he played upon the smugness and venality of the colonial Spanish. After arriving in Saint Domingue, he obtained papers identifying him as a botanizing physician and declared himself in search of the botanicals necessary for his treatment of gout. He herbalized in Havana, awaiting transport to Mexico, and on his arrival in Veracruz in January 1777, endeared himself locally by identifying the "true" jalap – a useful drug that was imported expensively, even though locally abundant. Sensing that something was wrong, the viceroy ordered him to leave, unwilling "to open to strangers the secrets of the country". Thiéry de Menonville, with the image of Jason and the Golden Fleece constantly in his mind's eye, slipped over the ramparts of Veracruz one evening and set out, in the guise of a Catalan in order to account for his Frenchified Spanish and his dress, for Oaxaca where the best cochineal was produced.

In Oaxaca, he purchased from Indians and blacks the insects and the cacti they parasitize, and some pods of vanilla, which he jumbled among commonplace herbal specimens in his collecting case. Once safely ashore in Saint Domingue he established a plantation of the nopal cactus in the botanical garden, the jardin du roi that he established at Port-au-Prince and sent further cactus pads and cochineal insects to the scientific academy at Cap Français. With the success of the adventure he was rewarded with the title of Botaniste du roi and an annuity of 6000 livres. However, within two years of his return he was dead of "malignant fever" at the age of forty-one.

As well as vanilla, Thiéry de Menonville brought with him to Saint Domingue jalap of Mexico, indigo seeds of Guatemala, and cotton seeds from Veracruz; in his travels he also noted the strangely beautiful flowers he had seen there, dahlias as they turned out to be, in his official report, published in 1787, after his death, by the academy at Cap-Haïtien, previously named Cap‑Français (initially Cap-François).

In 1821, botanist DC. published a Menonvillea, a genus of flowering plants from Chile and western Argentina, belonging to the family Brassicaceae in his honour.
