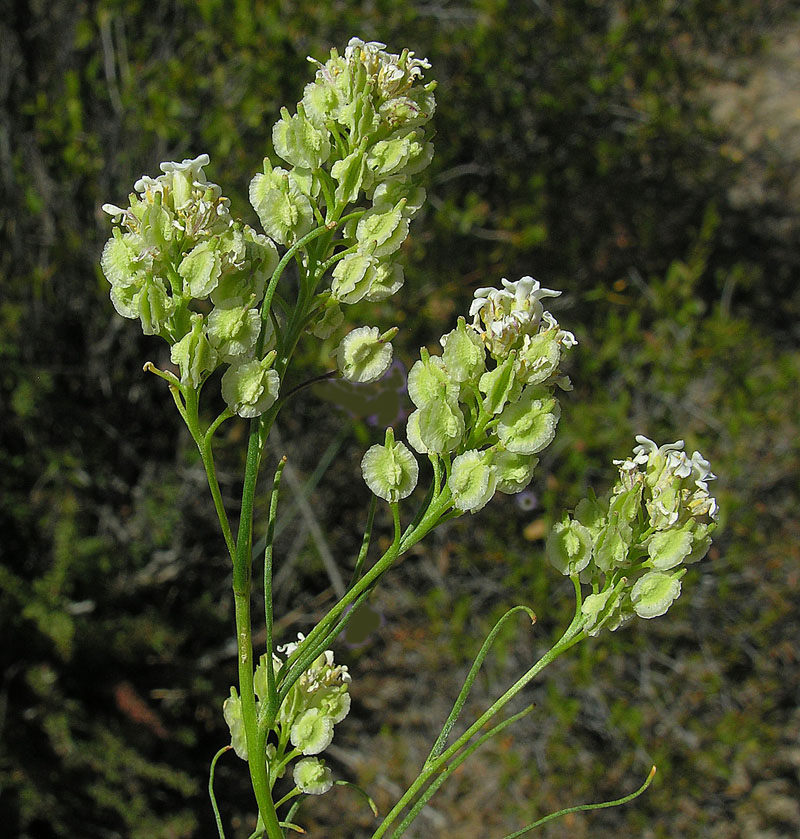
- Menonvillea filifolia

Scientific classification
- Kingdom: Plantae
- Clade: Tracheophytes
- Clade: Angiosperms
- Clade: Eudicots
- Clade: Rosids
- Order: Brassicales
- Family: Brassicaceae
- Genus: Menonvillea; DC.

Synonyms
- Cymatoptera Turcz.; Decaptera Turcz.; Dispeltophorus Lehm.; Hexaptera Hook.

= Menonvillea =

Genus of flowering plant

Menonvillea is a genus of flowering plants belonging to the family Brassicaceae.

It includes 24 species native to Chile and western Argentina.

The genus name of Menonvillea is in honour of Nicolas-Joseph Thiéry de Menonville (1739–1780), a French botanist who volunteered to be sent to Mexico in 1776 to steal the cochineal insect valued for its scarlet dye. It was first described and published in Mém. Mus. Hist. Nat. Vol.7 on page 236 in 1821.

== Accepted species ==
According to Kew 24 species are accepted.

- Menonvillea chilensis (Turcz.) B.D.Jacks.
- Menonvillea cicatricosa (Phil.) Rollins
- Menonvillea comberi Sandwith
- Menonvillea constitutionis (Phil.) Rollins
- Menonvillea cuneata (Gillies & Hook.) Rollins
- Menonvillea famatinensis (Boelcke) Rollins
- Menonvillea filifolia Fisch. & C.A.Mey.
- Menonvillea flexuosa Phil.
- Menonvillea frigida (Phil.) Rollins
- Menonvillea linearifolia (Hook. & Arn.) Al-Shehbaz & Salariato
- Menonvillea linearis DC.
- Menonvillea littoralis (Barnéoud) Rollins
- Menonvillea macrocarpa (I.M.Johnst.) Rollins
- Menonvillea marticorenae (Al-Shehbaz) Salariato & Al-Shehbaz
- Menonvillea minima Rollins
- Menonvillea nordenskjoeldii (Dusén) Rollins
- Menonvillea orbiculata Phil.
- Menonvillea patagonica Speg.
- Menonvillea pinnatifida Barnéoud
- Menonvillea purpurea (G.T.Hastings) Rollins
- Menonvillea rigida Rollins
- Menonvillea scapigera (Phil.) Rollins
- Menonvillea spathulata (Gillies & Hook.) Rollins
- Menonvillea virens (Phil.) Rollins
- Menonvillea zuloagaensis Al-Shehbaz

=== Formerly placed here ===
- Aimara rollinsii (Al-Shehbaz & Martic.) Salariato & Al-Shehbaz (as Menonvillea rollinsii Al-Shehbaz & Martic.)
