= Bolivian Yungas =

Geographical region of Bolivia

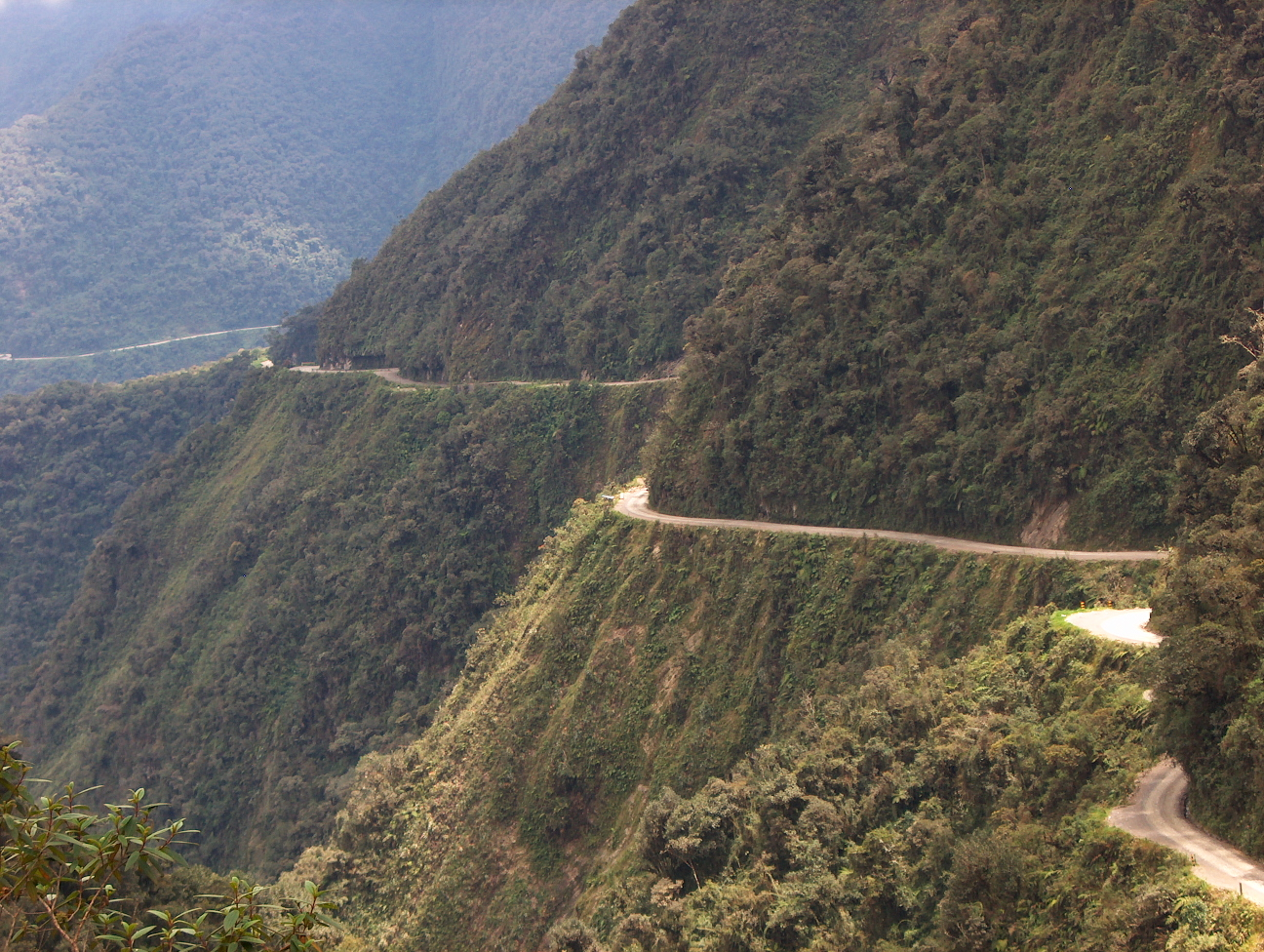
- Yungas Road through the Bolivian Yungas

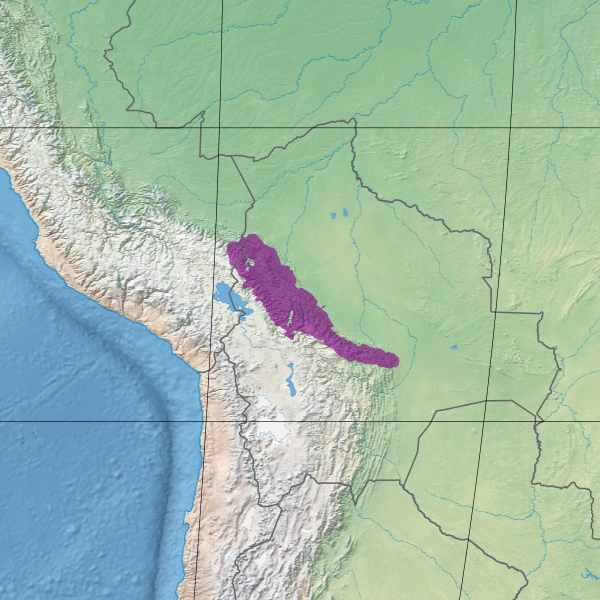
- Ecoregion territory (in purple)

Ecology
- Realm: Neotropical
- Biome: Tropical and subtropical moist broadleaf forest
- Borders: List: Bolivian montane dry forests; Central Andean puna; Central Andean wet puna; Chaco; Chiquitano dry forests; Peruvian Yungas; Southwest Amazon moist forests

Geography
- Area: 90,500 km^{2} (34,900 mi^{2})
- Countries: Bolivia; Peru

Conservation
- Protected: 49.37%

The Bolivian Yungas is a tropical and subtropical moist broadleaf forest ecoregion in the Yungas of central Bolivia.

== Setting ==
The ecoregion occurs in elevations ranging from 400 to 3,500 metres (1,300 to 11,500 ft) on the eastern slopes of the Andes in Bolivia, extending into a small portion of southeastern Peru. It forms a transition zone between the Southwest Amazon moist forests to the northeast and the Central Andean puna and wet puna to the southwest.

== Climate ==
The climate in this ecoregion varies from tropical rainforest to tropical monsoon. Fog and rain deposited by northern trade winds contribute to the high humidity and precipitation of the Yungas.

== Flora ==
Epiphytes are abundant and include bromeliads, orchids, and tree-ferns (Cyathea). Chusquea bamboo is an indicator species of the ecoregion.

== Fauna ==
Mammals found in this ecoregion include the spectacled bear (Tremarctos ornatus), lowland tapir (Tapirus terrestris) dwarf brocket deer (Mazama chunyi), jaguar (Panthera onca), jaguarundi (Herpailurus yagouaroundi), pacarana (Dinomys branickii), Geoffroy's cat (Leopardus geoffroyi), and tilcayo cat (Leopardus tilcayo).

Bird species include the diademed tapaculo (Scytalopus schulenbergi), green-capped tanager (Stilpnia meyerdeschauenseei), Andean cock-of-the-rock (Rupicola peruvianus), and southern helmeted curassow (Pauxi unicornis).

== Human use ==
The Bolivian Yungas is the center of the Afro-Bolivian community.

The Yungas Road, known for being dangerous, connects La Paz to the Bolivian Yungas.

== Protected areas ==
Steep terrain, high precipitation, and difficult access have kept much of this ecoregion in a natural state. 49.37% of the ecoregion is in protected areas. They include:

- Amboró National Park
- Bahuaja-Sonene National Park
- Carrasco National Park
- Cotapata National Park and Integrated Management Natural Area
- Espejillos Natural Monument
- Incacasani Altamachi National Park
- Isiboro Sécure National Park and Indigenous Territory
- Madidi National Park
- Pilón Lajas Biosphere Reserve and Communal Lands
- Tunari National Park
