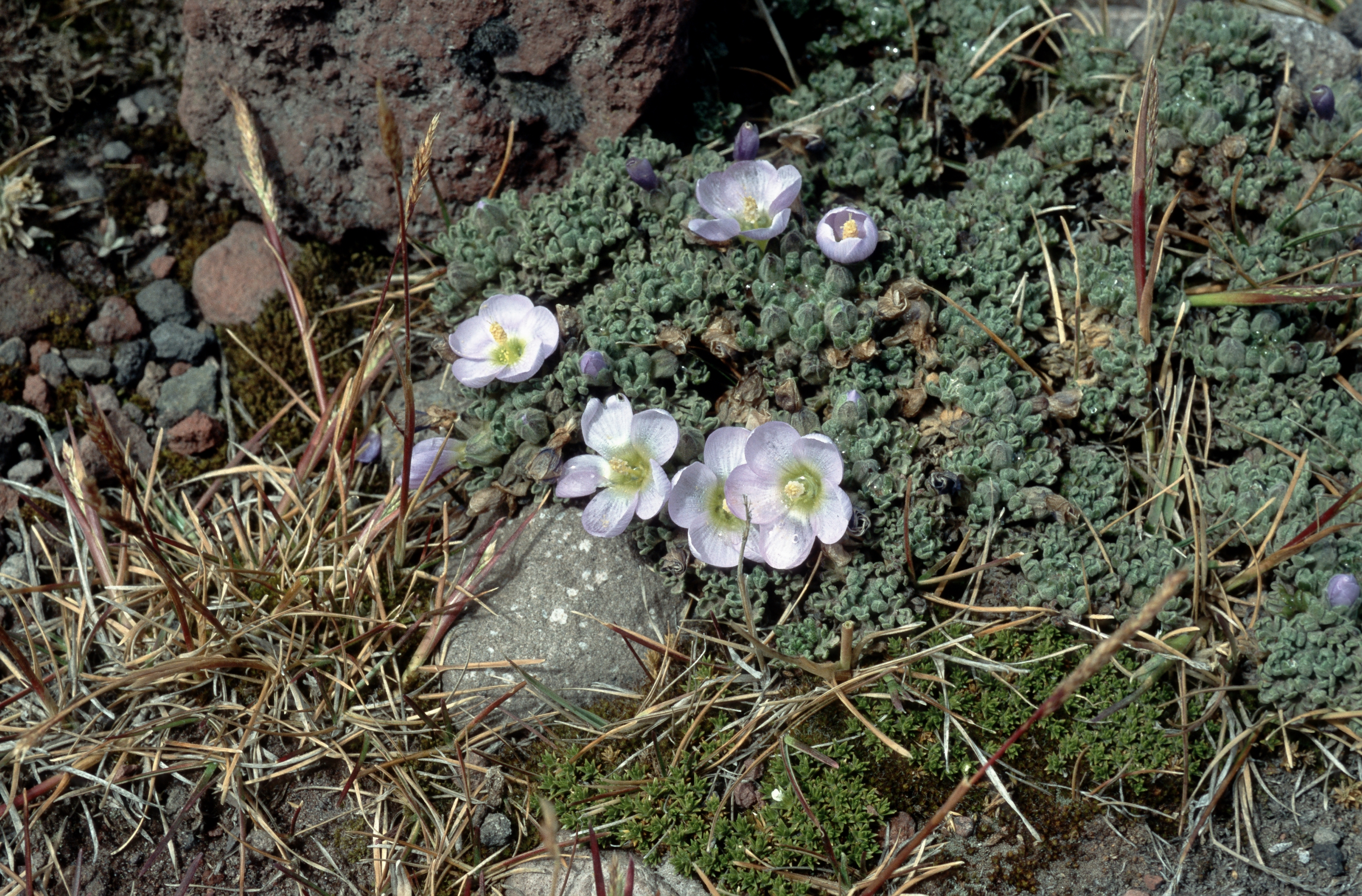

Conservation status
- Least Concern (IUCN 3.1)

Scientific classification
- Kingdom: Plantae
- Clade: Tracheophytes
- Clade: Angiosperms
- Clade: Eudicots
- Clade: Rosids
- Order: Malvales
- Family: Malvaceae
- Genus: Nototriche
- Species: N. jamesonii

Binomial name
- Nototriche jamesonii A.W.Hill

= Nototriche jamesonii =

Species of flowering plant

Nototriche jamesonii is a species of flowering plant in the family Malvaceae. It is found only in Ecuador. Its natural habitat is subtropical or tropical high-altitude grassland.
