= Andicolea ollgaardii =

Conservation status
- Vulnerable (IUCN 3.1)

Scientific classification
- Kingdom: Plantae
- Clade: Tracheophytes
- Clade: Angiosperms
- Clade: Eudicots
- Clade: Asterids
- Order: Asterales
- Family: Asteraceae
- Genus: Andicolea
- Species: A. ollgaardii

Binomial name
- Andicolea ollgaardii (M.O.Dillon & Sagást.) Mayta & Molinari (2021)

Synonyms
- Loricaria ollgaardii M.O.Dillon & Sagást. (1986)

Species of flowering plant

Andicolea ollgaardii is a species of flowering plant in the family Asteraceae. It is found only in Ecuador. Its natural habitat is subtropical or tropical high-elevation grassland. It is threatened by habitat loss.
