= Andicolea azuayensis =

Conservation status
- Endangered (IUCN 3.1)

Scientific classification
- Kingdom: Plantae
- Clade: Tracheophytes
- Clade: Angiosperms
- Clade: Eudicots
- Clade: Asterids
- Order: Asterales
- Family: Asteraceae
- Genus: Andicolea
- Species: A. azuayensis

Binomial name
- Andicolea azuayensis (Cuatrec.) Mayta & Molinari (2021)

Synonyms
- Loricaria azuayensis Cuatrec. (1954)

Species of flowering plant

Andicolea azuayensis is a species of flowering plant in the family Asteraceae. It is found only in Ecuador. Its natural habitat is subtropical or tropical high-elevation grassland. It is threatened by habitat loss.
