= Aymara Lupaca Reserved Zone =

Protected area in Peru

Coordinates: 16.8°S 69.4°W

The Aymara Lupaca Reserved Zone was a protected area in southeastern Peru, set up in 1996, with an area of around 200,000 hectares. It was expanded in January 2006, but the decree was repealed in 2009.

The zone was established to protect the flora and wild fauna of the Central Andean puna and to preserve the ruins of Tanqa Tanqa of the Lupaca culture shaped by Chullpas, as well as the funeral towers, fortifications and other archaeological sites that could be studied.

This region receives rain between the months of September and March.
