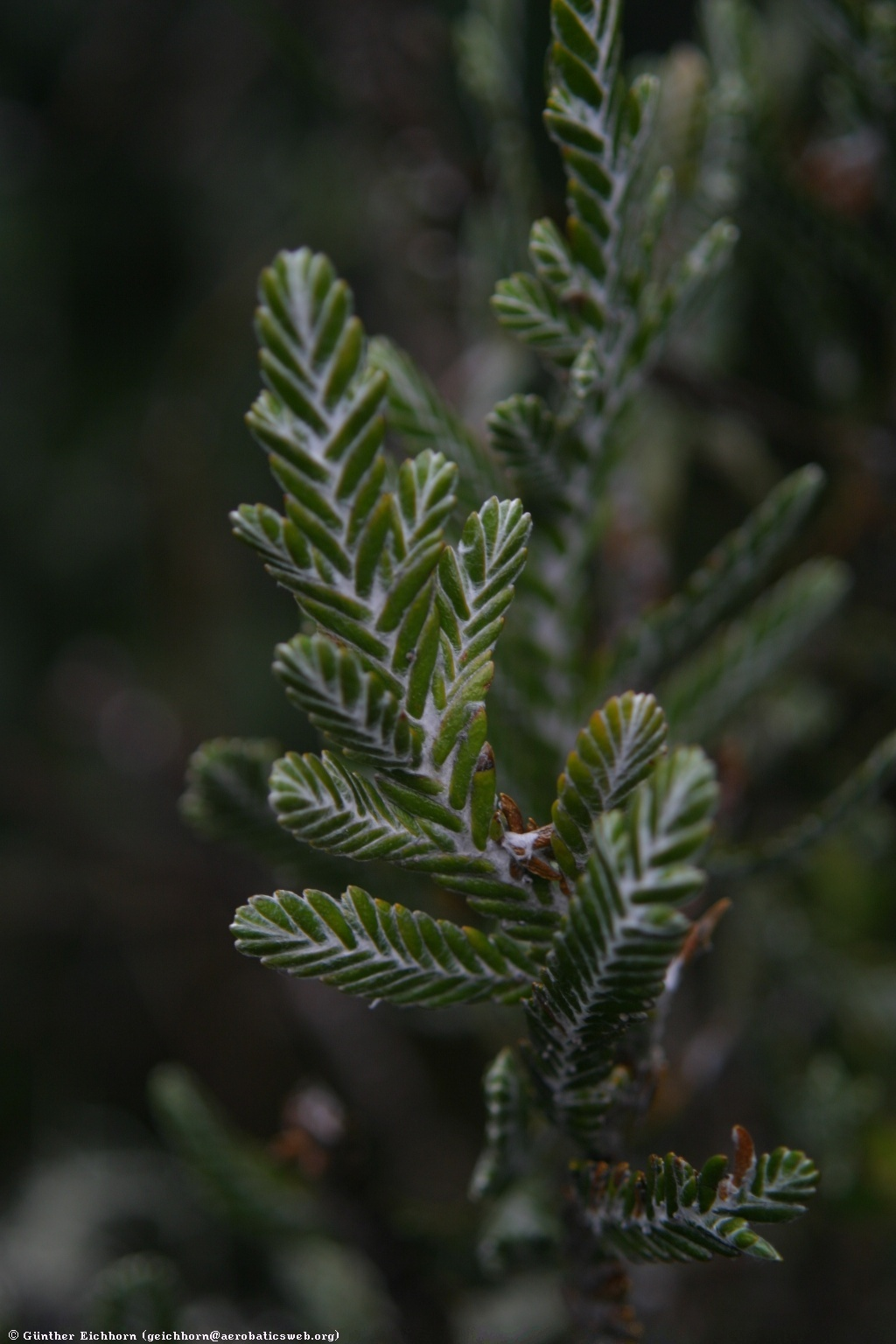
- Andicolea thuyoides on Cotopaxi, Ecuador

Scientific classification
- Kingdom: Plantae
- Clade: Tracheophytes
- Clade: Angiosperms
- Clade: Eudicots
- Clade: Asterids
- Order: Asterales
- Family: Asteraceae
- Genus: Andicolea
- Species: A. thuyoides

Binomial name
- Andicolea thuyoides (Lam.) Mayta & Molinari (2021)

Synonyms
- Baccharis thuyoides (Lam.) Pers. (1807); Conyza thuyoides Lam. (1786); Loricaria microphylla (Wedd.) Hieron. (1894); Loricaria stenophylla Wedd. (1856); Loricaria stenophylla var. microphylla Wedd. (1856); Loricaria stenophylla var. vernicosa Wedd. (1856); Loricaria stuebelii Hieron. (1895); Loricaria thuyoides (Lam.) Sch.Bip. (1860); Loricaria thuyoides var. laxifolia Cuatrec. (1954); Loricaria thuyoides f. major Cuatrec. (1935); Loricaria thuyoides var. microphylla (Wedd.) Cuatrec. (1954); Loricaria thuyoides var. stuebelii (Hieron.) Cuatrec. (1954); Molina incana Ruiz & Pav. (1798); Tafalla thuyoides (Lam.) D.Don (1831); Thyopsis stenophylla Wedd. (1856), not validly publ.

= Andicolea thuyoides =

Species of shrub

Andicolea thuyoides is a terrestrial shrub in the high Andes. It is native to Colombia, Ecuador, Peru, and Bolivia.
