= Peruvian Yungas =

Tropical and subtropical moist broadleaf forest ecoregion in the Yungas of Peru

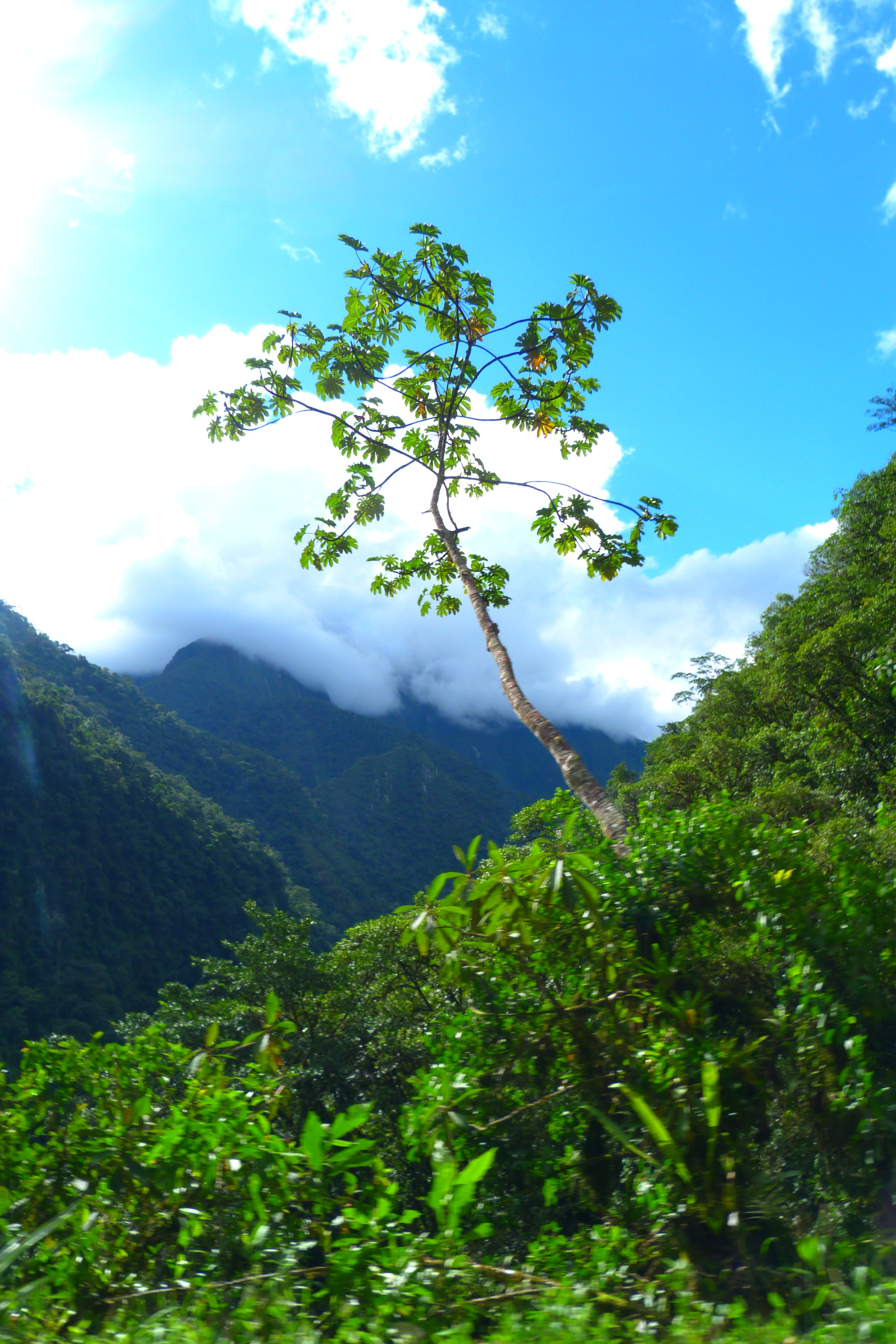
- Yanachaga–Chemillén National Park in the Department of Pasco

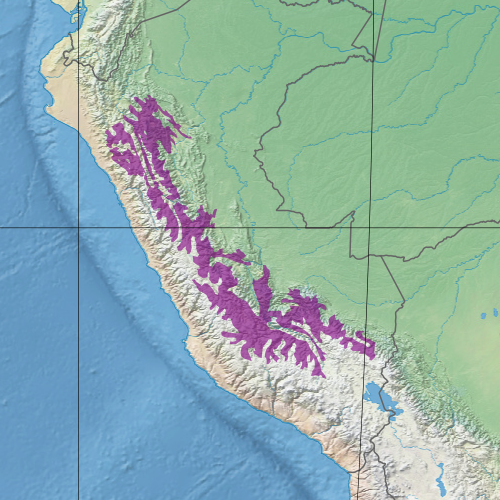
- Ecoregion territory (in purple)

Ecology
- Biome: Tropical and subtropical moist broadleaf forest
- Borders: List: Ucayali moist forests; Marañón dry forests; Central Andean wet puna; Central Andean puna; Bolivian Yungas; Southwest Amazon moist forests

Geography
- Area: 186,700 km^{2} (72,100 sq mi)
- Country: Peru

The Peruvian Yungas comprise a tropical and subtropical moist broadleaf forest ecoregion in Peru.

== History ==
During the Inca Empire, the term yunga referred to both the western and eastern slopes of the Andes and their inhabitants. In the Spanish colonial era, it became primarily associated with the western foothills near the desert coast and the local Indians. Today, yunga can refer to the lower slopes on both sides of the Andes, though yungas mostly denotes the eastern foothills between the Andes and the Amazon basin, with both having mostly lost their ethnic associations.

== Setting ==
The Yungas are found on the eastern slopes and valleys of the Peruvian Andes. They form a transition zone between the Southwest Amazon moist forests and Ucayali moist forests at lower elevations to the east and the Central Andean puna and wet puna at higher elevations to the west.

== Climate ==
The climate in this ecoregion varies from a tropical rainforest climate in the north to a subtropical highland climate in the south. Precipitation ranges from 500 to 2,000 millimeters (19.7 to 78.7 in) per year.

== Flora ==
This ecoregion contains over 3,000 species of plants, including 200 species of orchids. Orchid genera include Epidendrum and Maxillaria. Tree ferns (Cyathea) and bamboo (Chusquea) are common. Below 2,700 metres (8,900 ft), the forest includes species such as cedar (Cedrela), trumpet tree (Tabebuia), and relatives of papaya (Carica). Above 3,500 metres (11,500 ft), there are scrublands and wet rocky thickets with shrubs and land orchids as well as forests of Podocarpus conifers.

== Fauna ==
This ecoregion contains over 200 species of vertebrates. The gallito de las rocas (Rupicola peruviana) is endemic.

Notable mammals include the shrew opossums (Caenolestes) and Kalinowski's Agouti (Dasyprocta kalinowskii), as well as the northern pudú (Pudu mephistophiles) and the hairy long-nosed armadillo (Dasypus pilosus).

Notable species with limited distributions found here include the horned curassow (Pauxi unicornis), hummingbirds (Metallura theresiae, Heliangelus regalis), the long-whiskered owlet (Xenoglaux loweryi) and the Marañón poison frog (Dendrobates mysteriosus).

Endangered and threatened species include the yellow-tailed woolly monkey (Oreonax flavicauda), jaguar (Panthera onca), ocelot (Leopardus pardalis), spectacled bear (Tremarctos ornatus), neotropical otter (Lontra longicaudis), colocolo (Oncifelis colocolo), Andean cock-of-the-rock (Rupicola peruviana) and cinchona (Cinchona sp.).

This ecoregions also has endemic species of butterflies from the genera Dismopha, Callithea, Paridos, and Morpho.

== Natural areas ==
- Bahuaja-Sonene National Park
- Amarakaeri Communal Reserve
- Megantoni National Sanctuary
- Manú National Park
- Otishi National Park
- Nor Yauyos-Cochas Landscape Reserve
- San Matías–San Carlos Protection Forest
- Yanachaga–Chemillén National Park
- Rio Abiseo National Park
- Alto Mayo Protection Forest
- Cutervo National Park
- Historic Sanctuary of Machu Picchu
