= Torotoro National Park =

National park in Bolivia

- IUCN category II (national park)
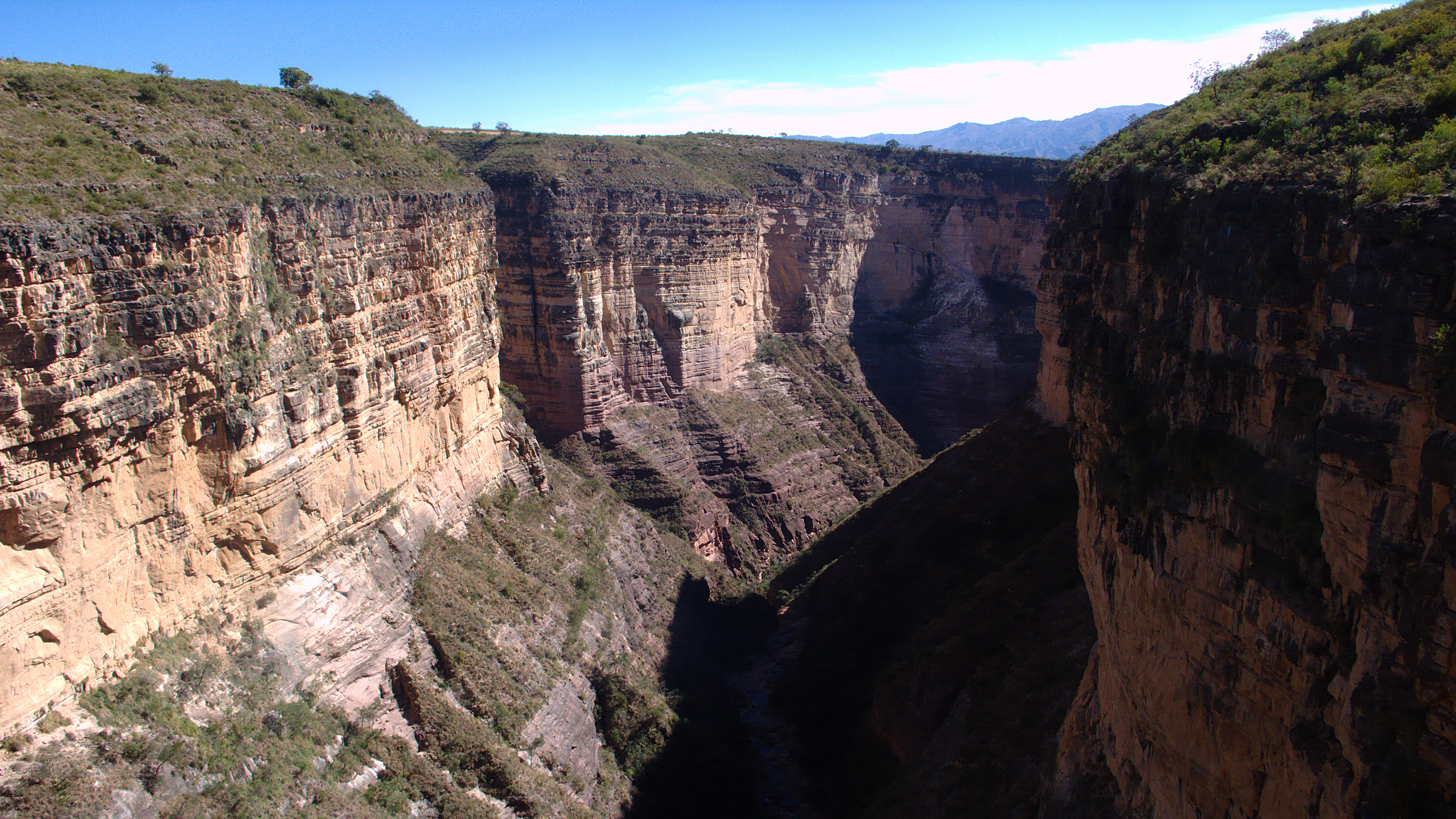
- Torotoro Canyon

- Location within Bolivia
- Coordinates: 18°6′S 65°46′W
- Area: 165 km^{2} (64 sq mi)
- Established: National Park 1989

Torotoro National Park (Spanish: Parque Nacional Torotoro) is a national park and town in Bolivia. The town was founded about 250 years ago by the Quechuas and the Spanish. It is located in the eastern mountain ranges of the South American Andes cordilleras in the area of Potosí.

== Geography ==
Torotoro National Park was established in 1989. It is situated in the northern Potosí department, 140 km south of Cochabamba. It covers 165 km^{2}, in a semi-arid landscape at altitudes between 2000 and 3500m above sea level, with canyons as deep as 300 meters. It includes typical features of karst terrain like caves and dolines, Paleozoic and Cretaceous calcitic deposits with fossils, and landscapes eroded by wind and waters.

Dinosaur bone fragments and more than 3,500 dinosaur footprints have been found in the park. They belong to biped and quadruped dinosaurs, theropods and sauropods from the Cretaceous period 120 million years ago.

Llama Chaki, an archaeological site southeast of the town of Torotoro, has remnants of the Quechua culture.

== Gallery ==
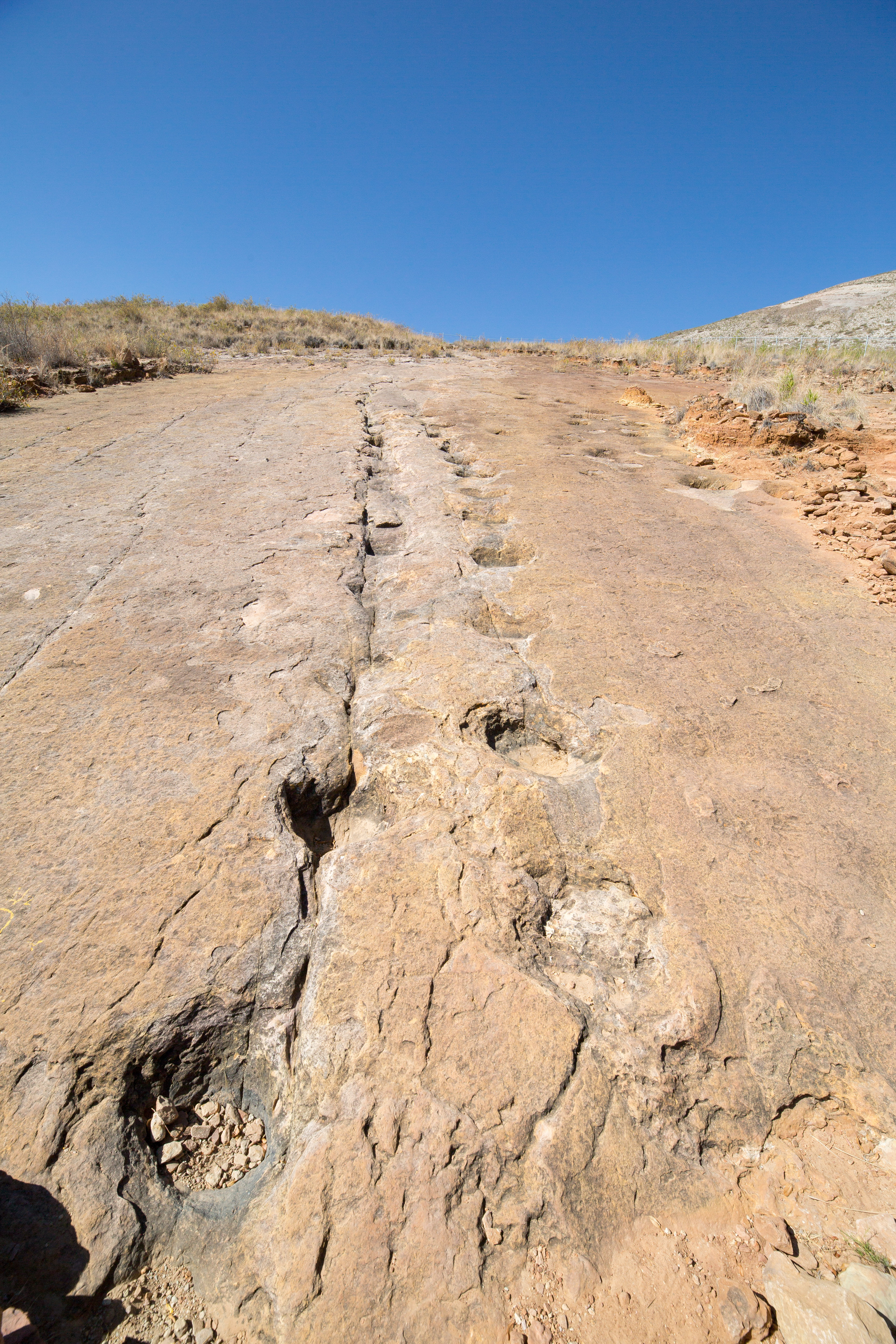
Fossils of dinosaur footprints in Torotoro.

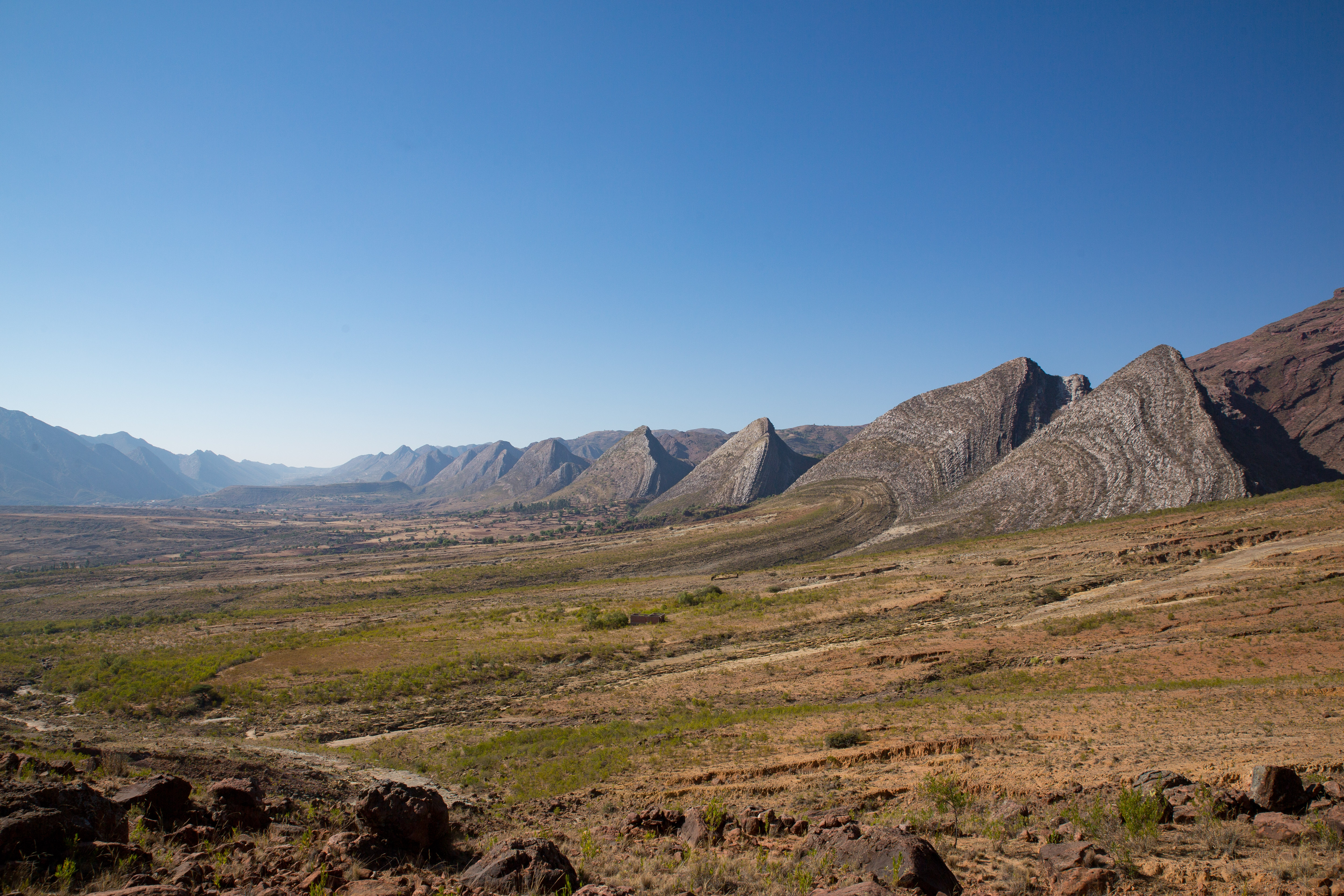
Rock formations in Torotoro.
