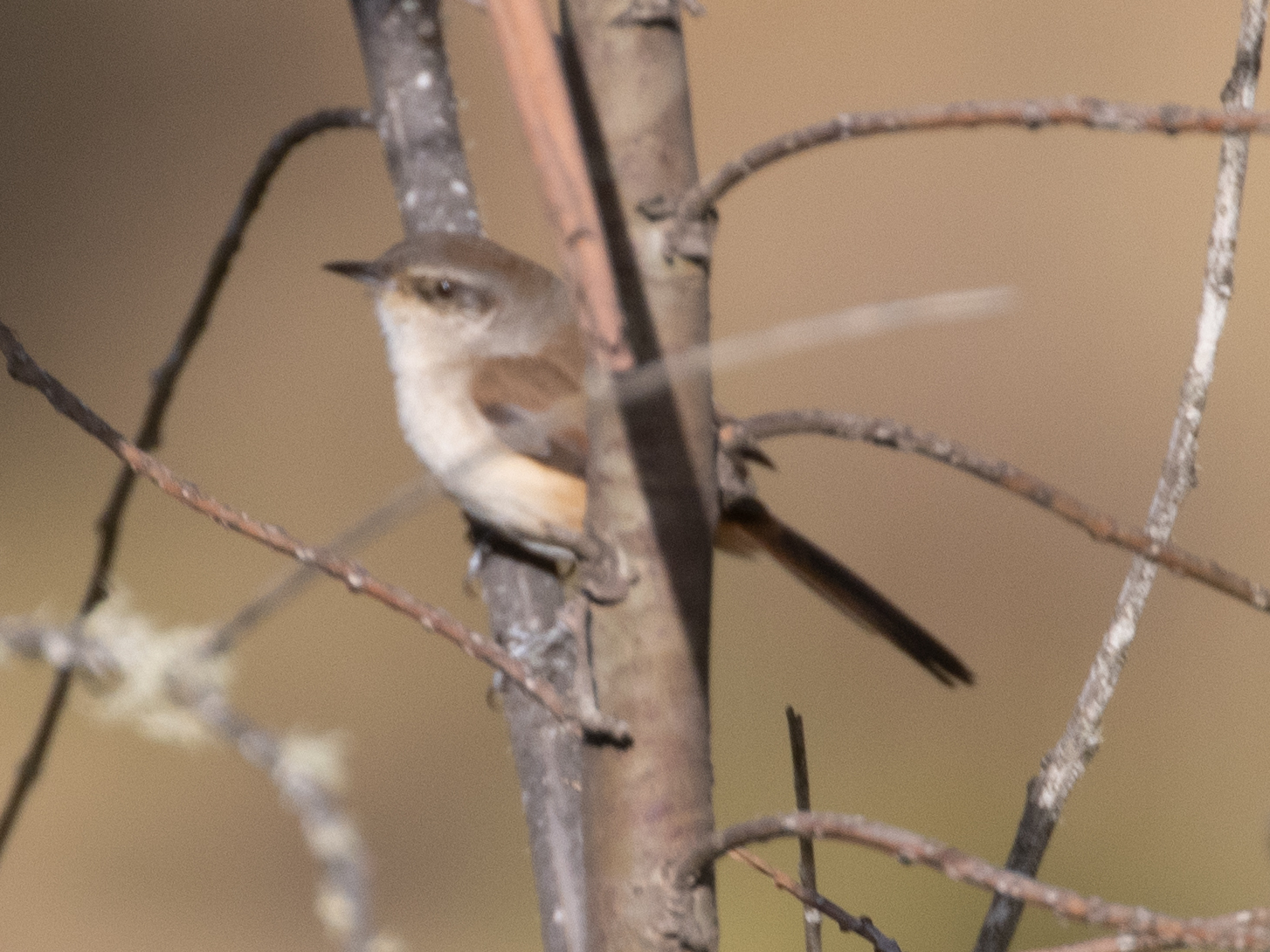

Conservation status
- Near Threatened (IUCN 3.1)

Scientific classification
- Kingdom: Animalia
- Phylum: Chordata
- Class: Aves
- Order: Passeriformes
- Family: Furnariidae
- Genus: Asthenes
- Species: A. berlepschi

Binomial name
- Asthenes berlepschi (Hellmayr, 1917)

= Berlepsch's canastero =

Species of bird

Berlepsch's canastero (Asthenes berlepschi) is a species of bird in the Furnariinae subfamily of the ovenbird family Furnariidae. It is endemic to Bolivia.

== Taxonomy and systematics ==
Several authors have suggested that Berlepsch's canastero should be treated as a subspecies of the rusty-vented canastero (A. dorbignyi) due to plumage similarities. A study with genetic data for many canasteros and other ovenbirds published in 2011 did not include Berlepshch's.

Berlepsch's canastero is monotypic.

The species' common name and specific epithet commemorate the German ornithologist and collector Hans von Berlepsch.

== Description ==
Berlepsch's canastero is 15 to 16 cm (5.9 to 6.3 in) long. Adults have an inconspicuous gray supercilium and blackish lores and ear coverts. Their crown is warm brown that becomes paler and duller on their back. Their rump and uppertail coverts are rufous. Their wings are mostly blackish with dark rufous edges and tips on their coverts. Their tail's outermost pair of feathers are rufous, the next pair partly rufous and partly blackish, and the rest fully blackish. Their throat, breast, and belly are creamy whitish, with the faintest hint of rufous in the center of the throat and faint dark scaling on the breast. Their flanks and undertail coverts are rufous. Their iris is brown, their maxilla dark, their mandible gray, and their legs and feet blue-gray. Juveniles have a more pronounced dark scaly pattern on the breast than adults.

== Distribution and habitat ==
Berlepsch's canastero is endemic to Bolivia. It is found only in the valley of the Consata River and its tributaries in north-central La Paz Department. It primarily inhabits semi-arid montane scrublands and frequently occurs in vegetation around pastures, farm, and human habitations. It has also been observed in Polylepis woodlands and Eucalyptus stands. In elevation it ranges between 2,300 and 3,700 m (7,500 and 12,100 ft).

== Behavior ==
=== Movement ===
Berlepsch's canastero is a year-round resident throughout its range.

=== Feeding ===
Berlepsch's canastero's diet has not been detailed but is thought to be mostly arthropods. It forages singly or in pairs, apparently gleaning prey from the ground and low vegetation.

=== Breeding ===
Berlepsch's canastero is thought to breed in the austral spring and summer. It builds a nest in a tree but nothing else is known about its breeding biology.

=== Vocalization ===
The song of Berlepsch's canastero is a trill that is similar to that of the rusty-vented canastero. That species' song "may begin with a series of introductory notes, but these apparently are not always given. The song then...accelerates and ascends, before descending and decelerating near the end".

== Status ==
The IUCN first assessed Berlepsch's canastero in 1994 as Vulnerable but since 2004 has rated it Near Threatened. It has a very small range and an unknown population size that is believed to be decreasing. The principal threat is conversion of its habitat to farming and ranching. "Despite surviving well in highly modified habitats, it must be considered at some risk owing to its tiny range in one small montane basin, its restricted elevational distribution, and the small amount of available habitat." It "appears to be common, but recorded from only a few localities within [its] tiny range".
