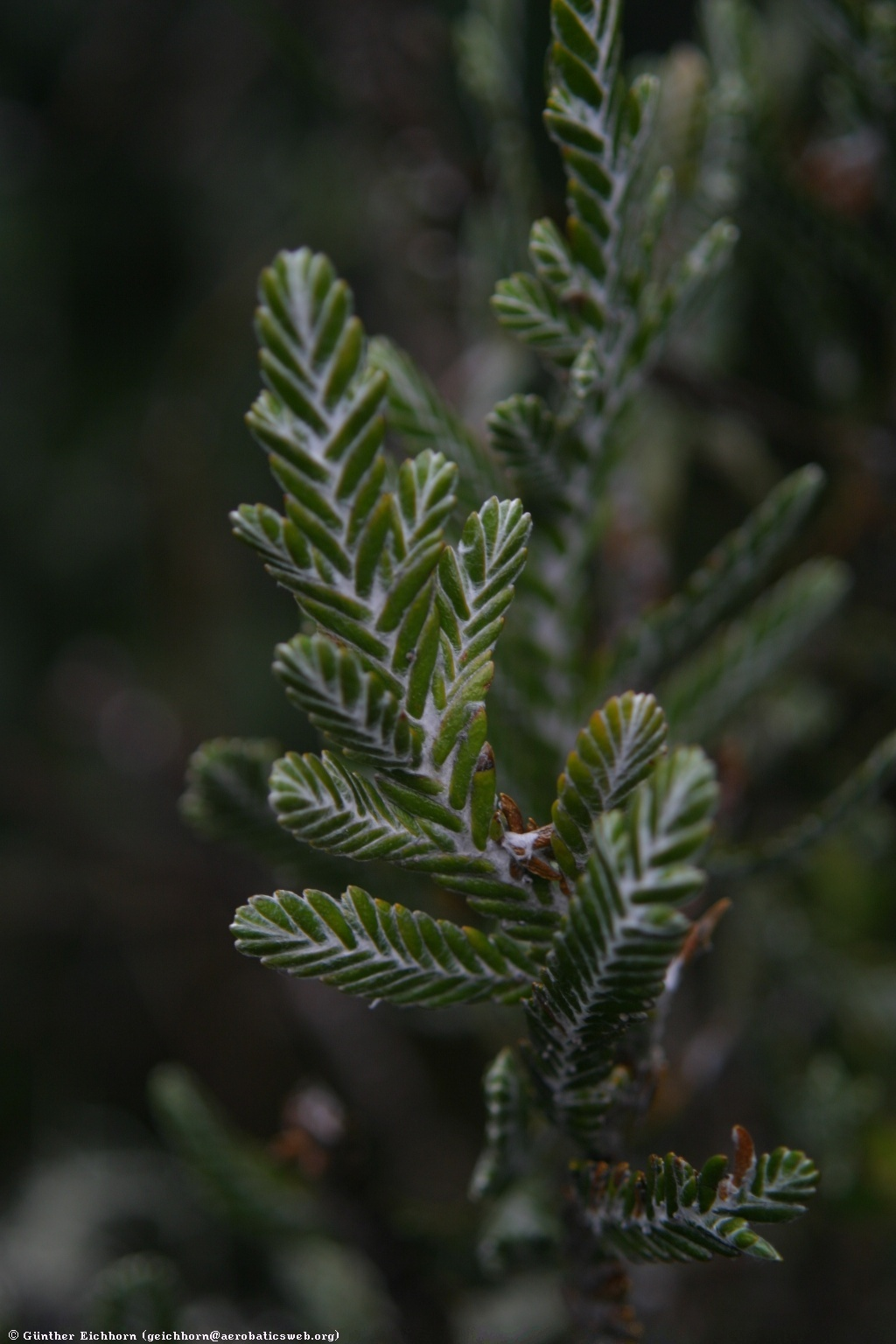
- Andicolea thuyoides

Scientific classification
- Kingdom: Plantae
- Clade: Tracheophytes
- Clade: Angiosperms
- Clade: Eudicots
- Clade: Asterids
- Order: Asterales
- Family: Asteraceae
- Tribe: Gnaphalieae
- Genus: Andicolea; Mayta & Molinari (2021)

Synonyms
- Loricaria Wedd. (1856), nom. illeg., non J.V.Lamour (1825).; Tafalla D.Don (1831), nom. illeg.; Thysopsis Wedd. (1856), pro syn.

= Andicolea =

Genus of plants

Andicolea, formerly known as Loricaria, is a genus of South American flowering plants in the tribe Gnaphalieae within the family Asteraceae.

== Taxonomy ==
The genus was first established as Loricaria by Hugh Weddell in 1855. However, a 2021 review of the nomenclatural history of the name found that Jean Vincent Lamouroux had already used the name Loricaria to describe a genus of brown algae split off from Fucus in 1813. Because that name was referenced several times by Lamouroux and other botanists in the years following its publication, it is considered the valid name. Thus, the name Andicolea was applied to the Asteraceae genus in reference to its Andean distribution.

While the exact number of accepted species has varied over the years, there are currently around twenty accepted names. These are divided into three sections based mainly on the location of the flower head: Graveoleum and Thyopsis (axillary), and Terminalia (terminal). However, the 2021 nomenclatural revision changed the name of sect. Thyopsis to sect. Andicolea after the new generic name.

Species
Section	Name	Authority	Distribution
Andicolea	Andicolea azuayensis	(Cuatrec.) Mayta & Molinari	Ecuador
Andicolea	Andicolea cinerea	(D.J.N.Hind) Mayta & Molinari	Ecuador
Andicolea	Andicolea complanata	(Sch.Bip.) Mayta & Molinari	Ecuador, Colombia
Andicolea	Andicolea lagunillensis	(Cuatrec.) Mayta & Molinari	Colombia
Andicolea	Andicolea leptothamna	(Mattf.) Mayta & Molinari	Ecuador, Peru
Andicolea	Andicolea ollgaardii	(M.O.Dillon & Sagást.) Mayta & Molinari	Ecuador
Andicolea	Andicolea pauciflora	(Cuatrec.) Mayta & Molinari	Ecuador, Peru
Andicolea	Andicolea scolopendra	(Hook.) Mayta & Molinari	Ecuador
Andicolea	Andicolea thujoides	(Lam.) Mayta & Molinari	Bolivia, Colombia, Ecuador, Peru
Andicolea	Andicolea thyrsoidea	(Cuatrec.) Mayta & Molinari	Bolivia, Colombia, Peru
Andicolea	Andicolea unduaviensis	(Cuatrec.) Mayta & Molinari	Bolivia
Graveoleum	Andicolea graveolens	(Sch.Bip.) Mayta & Molinari	Bolivia, Peru
Terminalia	Andicolea antisanensis	(Cuatrec.) Mayta & Molinari	Ecuador
Terminalia	Andicolea colombiana	(Cuatrec.) Mayta & Molinari	Colombia
Terminalia	Andicolea ferruginea	(Ruiz & Pav.) Mayta & Molinari	Ecuador, Peru
Terminalia	Andicolea ilinissae	(Benth.) Mayta & Molinari	Colombia, Ecuador
Terminalia	Andicolea lucida	(Cuatrec.) Mayta & Molinari	Bolivia, Peru
Terminalia	Andicolea lycopodinea	(Cuatrec.) Mayta & Molinari	Peru
Terminalia	Andicolea macbridei	(Cuatrec.) Mayta & Molinari	Peru
Terminalia	Andicolea puracensis	(Cuatrec.) Mayta & Molinari	Colombia
