= Central Andean puna =

Ecoregion in South America

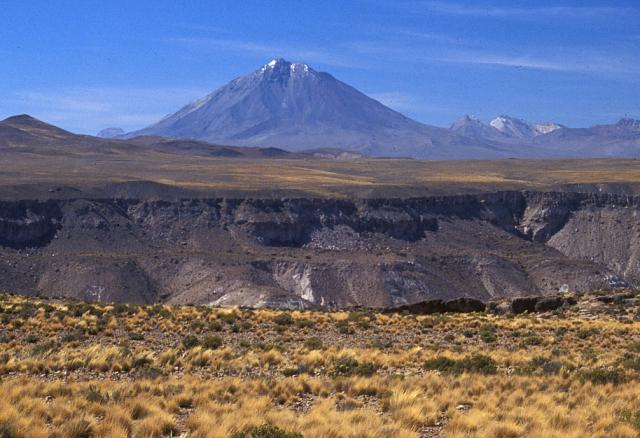
- Mount Tacora in Chile

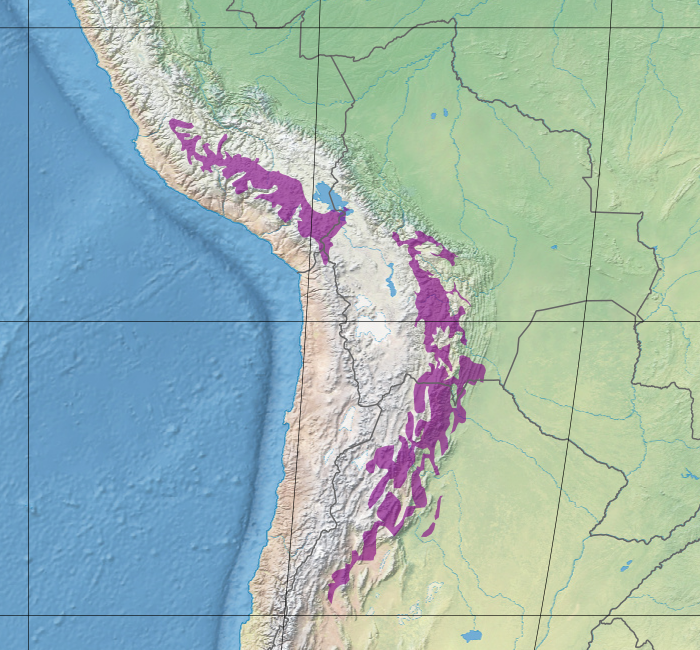
- Ecoregion territory (in purple)

Ecology
- Realm: Neotropical
- Biome: Montane grasslands and shrublands
- Borders: List: Central Andean wet puna; Central Andean dry puna; Sechura Desert; Peruvian Yungas; Bolivian Yungas; Southern Andean Yungas; High Monte; Southern Andean steppe

Geography
- Area: 161,400 km^{2} (62,300 mi^{2})
- Countries: Peru; Bolivia; Argentina; Chile

Conservation
- Protected: 18.68%

The Central Andean puna is a montane grasslands and shrublands ecoregion in the Andes of southern Peru, Bolivia, and northern Chile and Argentina.

== Setting ==
The landscape in this ecoregion consists of high mountains with permanent snow and ice, meadows, lakes, plateaus, and valleys. It transitions to the Central Andean wet puna to the north and the Central Andean dry puna to the south. Elevations range from 3,200 to 6,600 metres (10,500 to 21,700 ft).

== Climate ==
The climate is Köppen climate classification cold semi-arid. Precipitation ranges from 250 to 500 millimetres (9.8 to 19.7 in) per year.

== Flora ==
Flora consists typically of open meadows with rocks, bunchgrass, herbs, moss, and lichen. Grasses are represented by the genera Calamagrostis, Agrostis, and Festuca. Parastrephia lepidophylla and Margyricarpus are small bush species found here. Azorella compacta and Puya raimondi are shared with the wet puna. Polylepis, Buddleja, and Escallonia are trees found at lower elevations.

== Fauna ==
Darwin's rhea (Pterocnemia pennata) and the puna mouse (Punomys lemminus) are endemic bird and mammal species found here. Vicuña (Vicugna vicugna), guanaco (Lama guanicoe), chinchilla (Chinchilla brevicaudata), and viscacha (Lagidium) are also present. Threatened bird species include the royal cinclodes (Cinclodes aricomae), the tamarugo conebill (Conirostrum tamarugense), James's flamingo (Phoenicopterus jamesi), and the giant coot (Fulica gigantea).

== Protected areas ==
18.68% of the ecoregion is in protected areas. These include:

- Tariquía Flora and Fauna National Reserve
- Cordillera de Sama Biological Reserve
- Aymara Lupaca Reserved Zone
- Salinas and Aguada Blanca National Reservation
- Cotahuasi Subbasin Landscape Reserve
