= Aimara =

Scientific classification
- Kingdom: Plantae
- Clade: Tracheophytes
- Clade: Angiosperms
- Clade: Eudicots
- Clade: Rosids
- Order: Brassicales
- Family: Brassicaceae
- Subfamily: Brassicoideae
- Tribe: Cremolobeae
- Genus: Aimara; Salariato & Al-Shehbaz
- Species: A. rollinsii

Binomial name
- Aimara rollinsii (Al-Shehbaz & Martic.) Salariato & Al-Shehbaz

Synonyms
- Menonvillea rollinsii Al-Shehbaz & Martic.

Genus of flowering plant

Aimara is a genus of flowering plants in the family Brassicaceae. It contains a single species, Aimara rollinsii, a subshrub endemic to Antofagasta Region of northern Chile, where it grows in subalpine habitats in the Andes.

The species was first described as Menonvillea rollinsii by Ihsan Ali Al-Shehbaz & Clodomiro Fidel Segundo Marticorena in 1990. In 2013 Al-Shehbaz and Diego L. Salariato placed it in the new monotypic genus Aimara as Aimara rollinsii.
