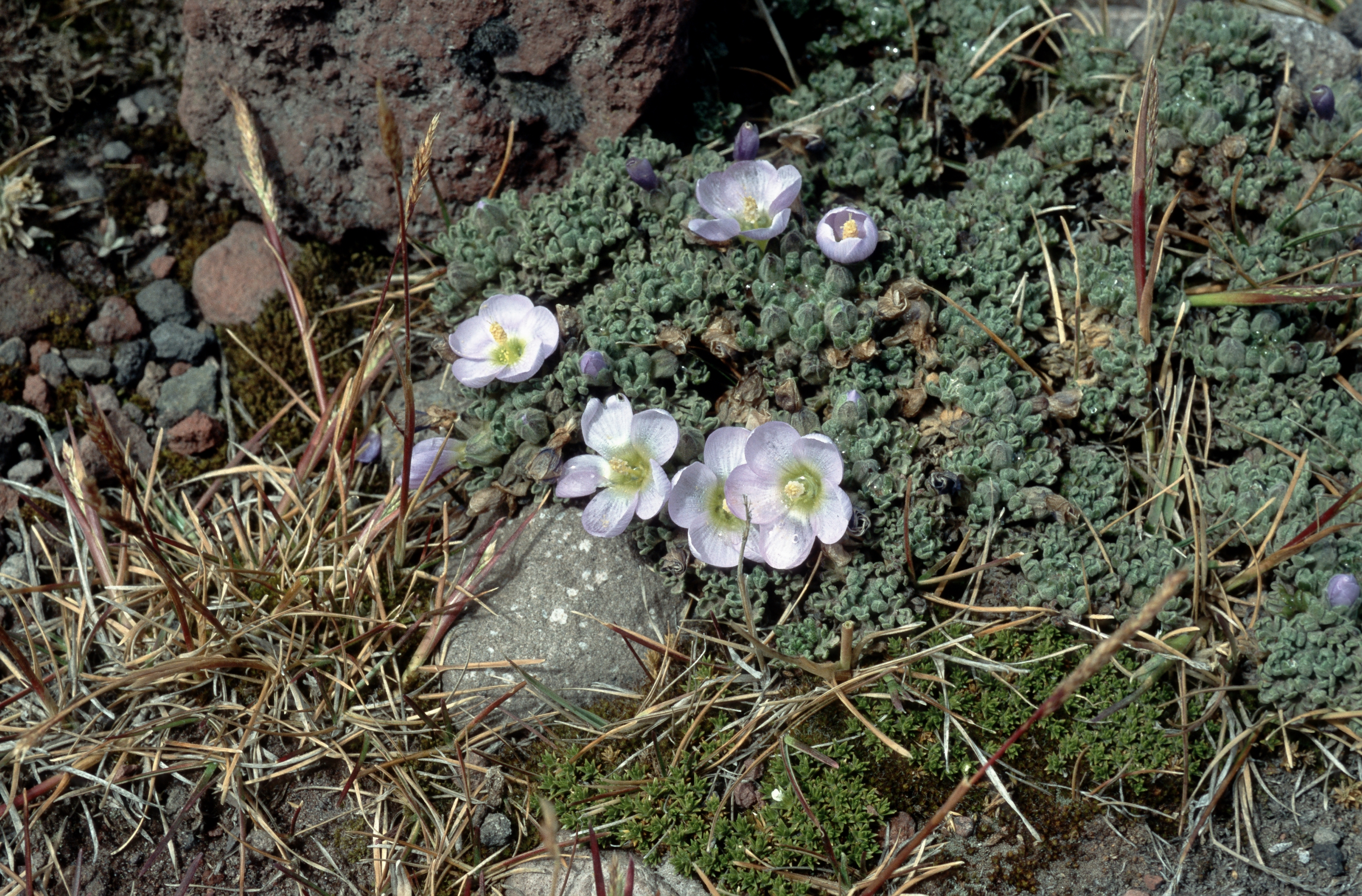
- Nototriche jamesonii

Scientific classification
- Kingdom: Plantae
- Clade: Tracheophytes
- Clade: Angiosperms
- Clade: Eudicots
- Clade: Rosids
- Order: Malvales
- Family: Malvaceae
- Subfamily: Malvoideae
- Tribe: Malveae
- Genus: Nototriche; Turcz.

= Nototriche =

Genus of flowering plants

Nototriche is a genus of flowering plant in the family Malvaceae. They generally grow at high elevations in the Andes region of South America, ranging from Colombia to central Chile and southern Argentina.

== Species ==
112 species are accepted:

- Nototriche acaulis (Cav.) Krapov.
- Nototriche agyna Krapov.
- Nototriche alternata A.W.Hill
- Nototriche anthemidifolia (Remy) A.W.Hill
- Nototriche antoniana Chanco
- Nototriche aretioides (A.Gray) A.W.Hill
- Nototriche argentea A.W.Hill
- Nototriche argyllioides A.W.Hill
- Nototriche armeriifolia A.W.Hill
- Nototriche artemisioides A.W.Hill
- Nototriche auricoma (Phil.) A.W.Hill
- Nototriche azorella A.W.Hill
- Nototriche borussica (Meyen) A.W.Hill
- Nototriche cabrerae Krapov.
- Nototriche caesia A.W.Hill
- Nototriche cajonensis Krapov.
- Nototriche calchaquensis Krapov.
- Nototriche carabayensis P.Gonzáles, Ed.Navarro & Chanco
- Nototriche castelnaeana (Wedd.) A.W.Hill
- Nototriche castillonii B.L.Burtt & A.W.Hill
- Nototriche chancoae Mazzei & P.Gonzáles
- Nototriche chaniensis C.A.Zanotti & J.C.Ospina
- Nototriche chimborazoensis Hochr.
- Nototriche chuculaensis Krapov.
- Nototriche cinerea A.W.Hill
- Nototriche clandestina (Phil.) A.W.Hill
- Nototriche coactilis A.W.Hill
- Nototriche coccinea A.W.Hill
- Nototriche compacta (A.Gray) A.W.Hill
- Nototriche condensata (Baker f.) A.W.Hill
- Nototriche congesta A.W.Hill
- Nototriche copon Krapov.
- Nototriche cupuliformis Krapov.
- Nototriche digitulifolia A.W.Hill
- Nototriche diminutiva (Phil.) I.M.Johnst.
- Nototriche dissecta A.W.Hill
- Nototriche ecuadoriensis Fryxell
- Nototriche ellipticifolia Hochr.
- Nototriche epileuca A.W.Hill
- Nototriche erinacea A.W.Hill
- Nototriche estipulata A.W.Hill
- Nototriche famatinensis A.W.Hill
- Nototriche flabellata (Wedd.) A.W.Hill
- Nototriche foetida Ulbr.
- Nototriche friesii A.W.Hill
- Nototriche glabra Krapov.
- Nototriche glacialis Ulbr.
- Nototriche glauca A.W.Hill
- Nototriche gracilens Killip & J.F.Macbr.
- Nototriche hieronymi A.W.Hill
- Nototriche hillii Krapov.
- Nototriche hunzikeri Krapov.
- Nototriche jamesonii A.W.Hill
- Nototriche kurtzii Krapov.
- Nototriche lanata A.W.Hill
- Nototriche leucosphaera A.W.Hill
- Nototriche lobbii (Baker f.) A.W.Hill
- Nototriche longirostris (Wedd.) A.W.Hill
- Nototriche longissima A.W.Hill
- Nototriche longituba B.L.Burtt & A.W.Hill
- Nototriche lopezii Krapov.
- Nototriche lorentzii A.W.Hill
- Nototriche macleanii (A.Gray) A.W.Hill
- Nototriche macrotuba Krapov.
- Nototriche mandoniana (Wedd.) A.W.Hill
- Nototriche meyenii Ulbr.
- Nototriche nana A.W.Hill
- Nototriche niederleinii A.W.Hill
- Nototriche nigrescens A.W.Hill
- Nototriche nivea A.W.Hill
- Nototriche obcuneata (Baker f.) A.W.Hill
- Nototriche obtusa A.W.Hill
- Nototriche orbignyana (Wedd.) A.W.Hill
- Nototriche ovalifolia Hochr.
- Nototriche ovata Krapov.
- Nototriche parviflora (Phil. ex Baker f.) A.W.Hill
- Nototriche pearcei (Baker f.) A.W.Hill
- Nototriche pedatiloba A.W.Hill
- Nototriche pediculariifolia (Meyen) A.W.Hill
- Nototriche pellicea A.W.Hill
- Nototriche peruviana Chanco
- Nototriche philippii A.W.Hill
- Nototriche phyllanthos (Cav.) A.W.Hill
- Nototriche pinnata (Cav.) A.W.Hill
- Nototriche polygama Krapov.
- Nototriche pseudolobulata Hochr.
- Nototriche pseudopichinchensis Hochr.
- Nototriche pulverulenta B.L.Burtt & A.W.Hill
- Nototriche pulvilla A.W.Hill
- Nototriche pulvinata A.W.Hill
- Nototriche purpurascens A.W.Hill
- Nototriche pusilla A.W.Hill
- Nototriche pygmaea (Remy) A.W.Hill
- Nototriche rohmederi Krapov.
- Nototriche rugosa (Phil.) A.W.Hill
- Nototriche sajamensis (Hieron.) A.W.Hill
- Nototriche salina B.L.Burtt & A.W.Hill
- Nototriche sepaliloba Hochr.
- Nototriche sleumeri Krapov.
- Nototriche staffordiae B.L.Burtt & A.W.Hill
- Nototriche stenopetala (A.Gray) A.W.Hill
- Nototriche stipularis (Phil.) A.E.Martic.
- Nototriche sulcata Krapov.
- Nototriche sulphurea A.W.Hill
- Nototriche tovarii Krapov.
- Nototriche trollii Ulbr.
- Nototriche tucumana Krapov.
- Nototriche turritella A.W.Hill
- Nototriche ulophylla (A.Gray) A.W.Hill
- Nototriche vargasii Krapov.
- Nototriche violacea A.W.Hill
- Nototriche viridula Krapov.

== Cultivation ==
Many species are extremely attractive as ornamental plants in alpine gardens, but very difficult to grow in cultivation. The UK Alpine Garden Society gives some details of the difficulties of cultivating these plants.
