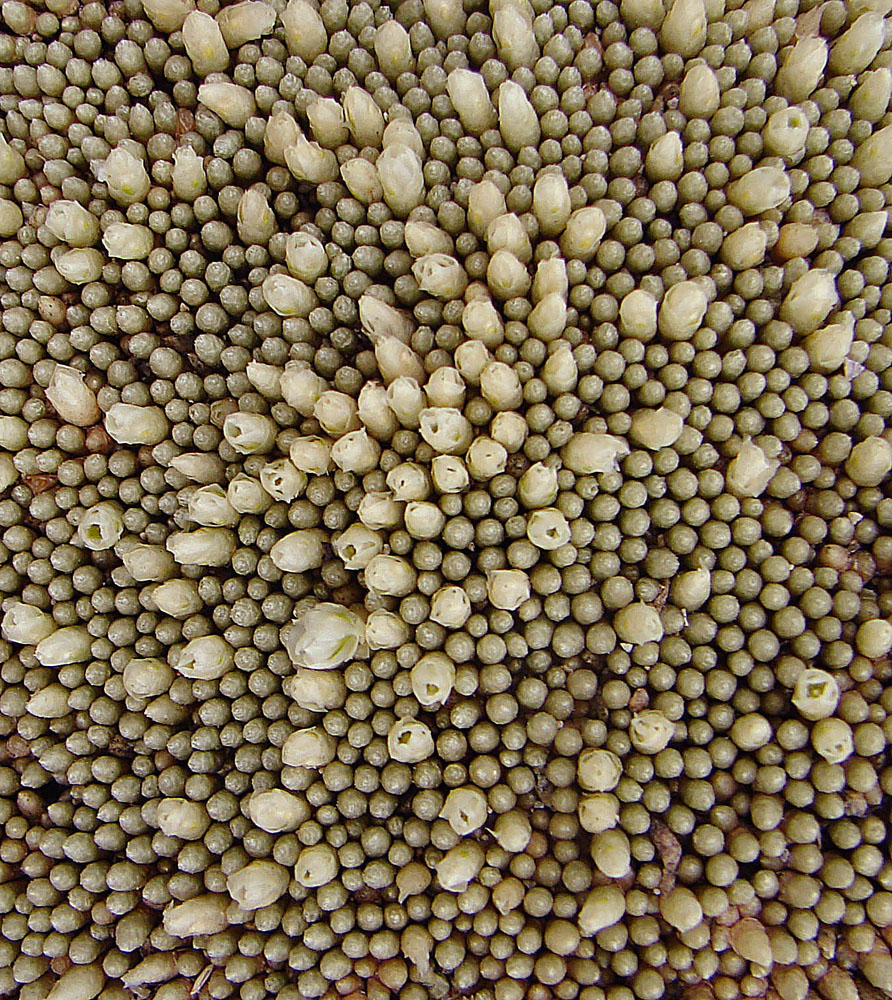
- Pycnophyllum bryoides

Scientific classification
- Kingdom: Plantae
- Clade: Tracheophytes
- Clade: Angiosperms
- Clade: Eudicots
- Order: Caryophyllales
- Family: Caryophyllaceae
- Genus: Pycnophyllum; J.Rémy

= Pycnophyllum =

Genus of plants

Pycnophyllum is a genus of flowering plants belonging to the family Caryophyllaceae.

Its native range is western South America to north-western Argentina.

== Species ==
14 species are accepted.

- Pycnophyllum argentinum Pax
- Pycnophyllum aristatum Mattf.
- Pycnophyllum aschersonianum Muschl.
- Pycnophyllum bryoides (Phil.) Rohrb.
- Pycnophyllum convexum Griseb.
- Pycnophyllum glomeratum Mattf.
- Pycnophyllum holleanum Mattf.
- Pycnophyllum huascaranum Timaná
- Pycnophyllum lechlerianum Rohrb.
- Pycnophyllum leptothamnum Mattf.
- Pycnophyllum macropetalum Mattf.
- Pycnophyllum markgrafianum Mattf.
- Pycnophyllum mattfeldii J.F.Macbr.
- Pycnophyllum molle J.Rémy
- Pycnophyllum mucronulatum Mattf.
- Pycnophyllum spathulatum Mattf.
- Pycnophyllum stuebelii Mattf.
- Pycnophyllum tetrastichum J.Rémy

=== Formerly placed here ===
- Stellaria villasenorii Montesin. & Borsch (as Pycnophyllum lanatum Phil.)
