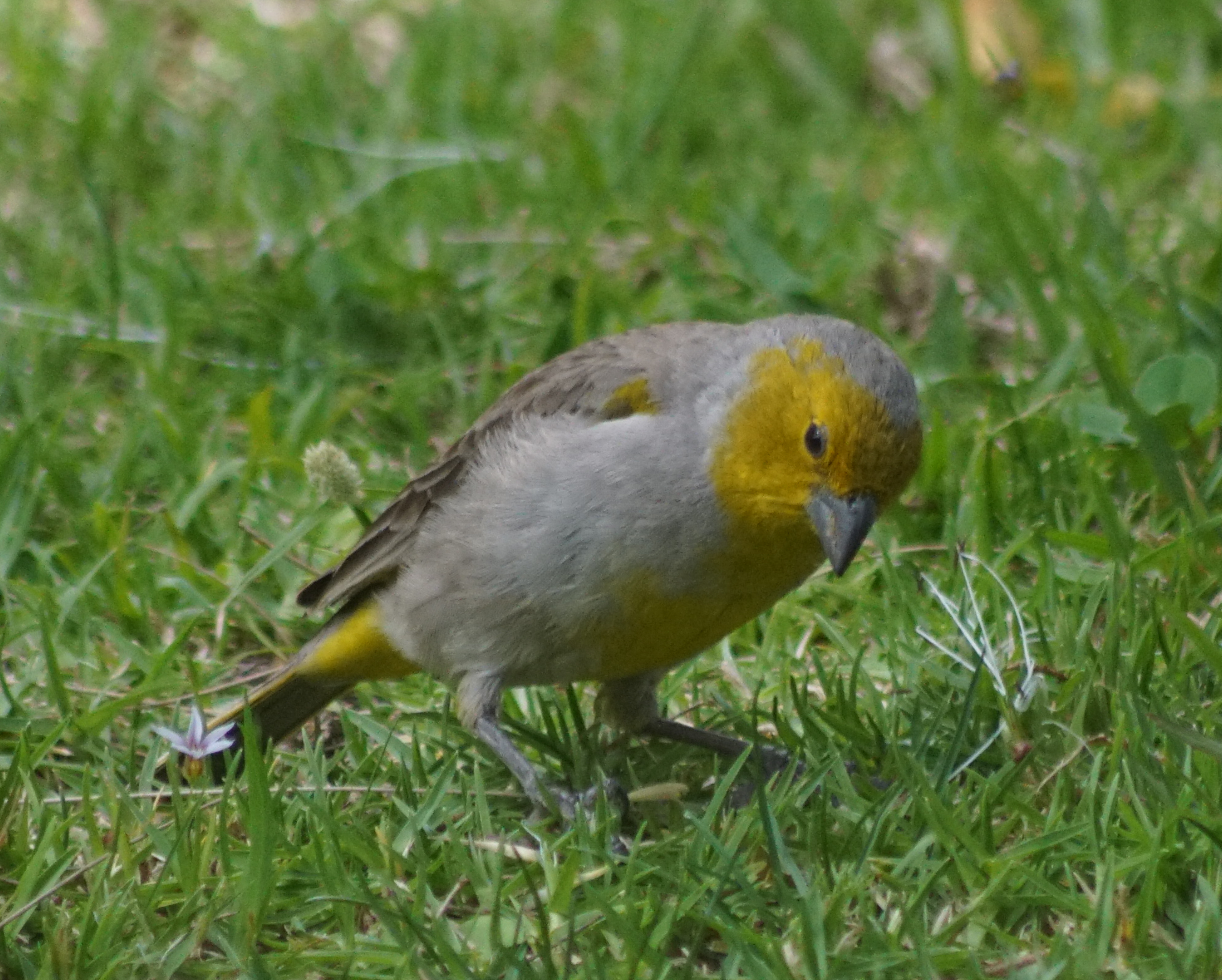
- A citron-headed yellow finch (Sicalis luteocephala) at the general cemetery (Cementerio General) in Sucre, Bolivia.

Conservation status
- Least Concern (IUCN 3.1)

Scientific classification
- Kingdom: Animalia
- Phylum: Chordata
- Class: Aves
- Order: Passeriformes
- Family: Thraupidae
- Genus: Sicalis
- Species: S. luteocephala

Binomial name
- Sicalis luteocephala (d'Orbigny & Lafresnaye, 1837)

= Citron-headed yellow finch =

Species of bird

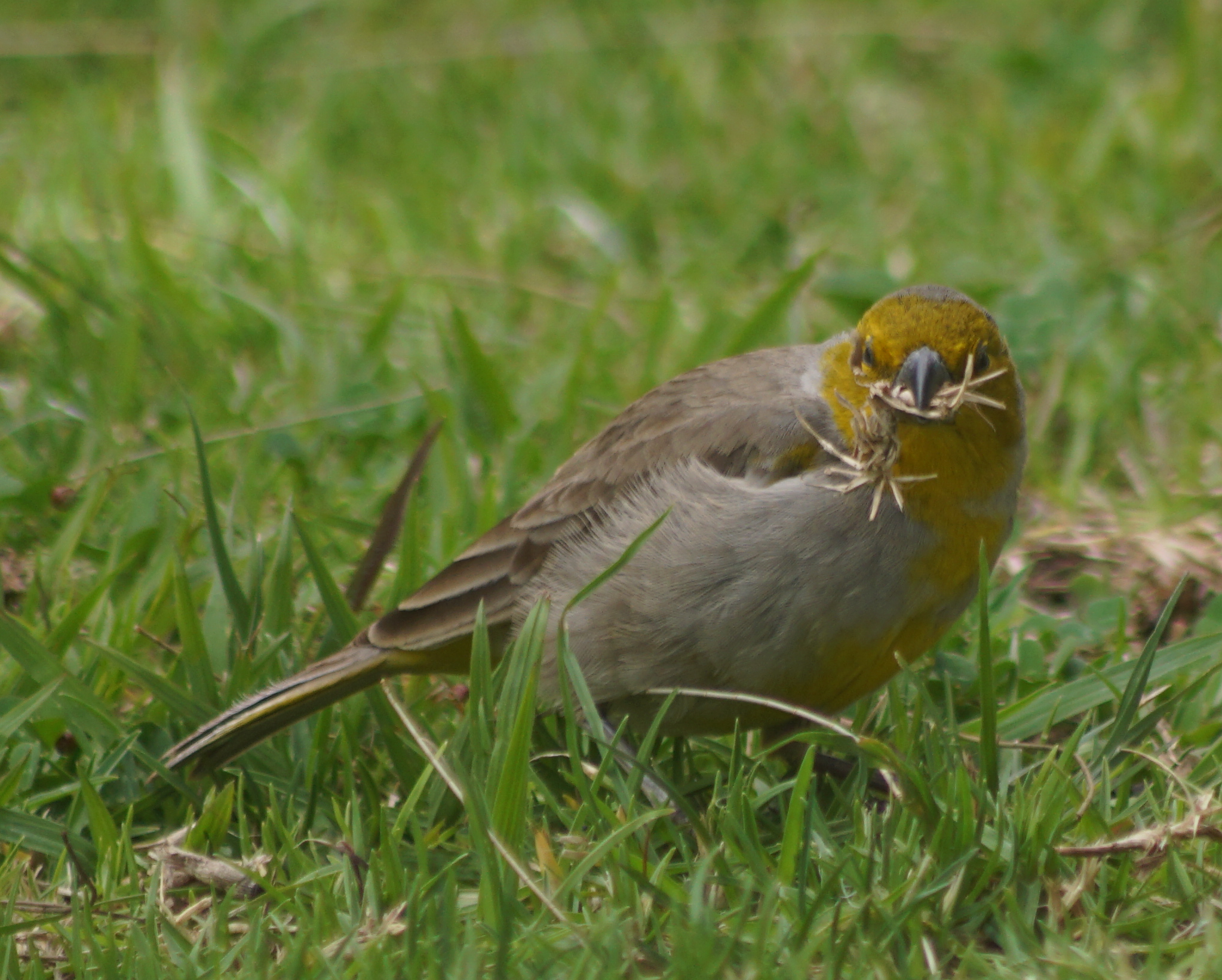
A citron-headed yellow finch (Sicalis luteocephala) eating seeds at the general cemetery (Cementerio General) in Sucre, Bolivia.

The citron-headed yellow finch (Sicalis luteocephala) is a species of bird in the family Thraupidae. It is found in the Andes of Bolivia and far northern Argentina. Its natural habitat is subtropical or tropical high-altitude shrubland.
