= List of ecoregions in Indonesia =

The following is a list of ecoregions in Indonesia. An ecoregion is defined by the WWF as a "large area of land or water that contains a geographically distinct assemblage of natural communities". There are terrestrial, freshwater, and marine ecoregions. Ecoregions classified into biomes or major habitat types.

Indonesia straddles two of the Earth's biogeographical realms, large-scale divisions of the Earth's surface based on the historic and evolutionary distribution patterns of plants and animals. Realms are subdivided into bioregions (and marine realms into provinces), which are in turn made up of multiple ecoregions. The Indomalayan realm extends across the western half of the archipelago, and the eastern half is in the Australasian realm. The Wallace Line, which runs between Borneo and Sulawesi, Bali and Lombok, is the dividing line.

The portion of Indonesia west of the Wallace Line is known as the Sundaland bioregion, which also includes Malaysia and Brunei. When sea levels fell during the ice ages, the shallow Sunda Shelf was exposed, linking the Islands of Sundaland to the Asian continent. Sundaland has many large mammals of Asian origin, including rhinoceros, Asian elephants, and apes.

East of the Wallace Line lies the Wallacea bioregion, made up of islands that were never linked to a continent, but were instead pushed up by the Australian continent's northward movement. Wallacea is a transitional region between Asia and Australia. It has a flora of mostly Indomalayan origin, with elements from Australasia, with a reptile and bird fauna of mainly Australian origin and no large mammal fauna.

The Aru Islands and the Indonesian portion of New Guinea are connected by the shallow Sahul Shelf to the Australian continent, and were connected by land during the ice ages. New Guinea has a flora of chiefly Asian origin with many Australasian elements, and a fauna similar to that of Australia.

== Terrestrial ==
=== Sundaland bioregion ===
==== Tropical and subtropical moist broadleaf forests ====
- Borneo lowland rain forests (Borneo, Natuna Islands)
- Borneo montane rain forests (Borneo)
- Borneo peat swamp forests (Borneo)
- Eastern Java–Bali montane rain forests (Bali, Java)
- Eastern Java–Bali rain forests (Bali, Java)
- Mentawai Islands rain forests (Mentawai Islands)
- Peninsular Malaysian rain forests (Anambas Islands, Lingga Islands, Riau Archipelago)
- Southwest Borneo freshwater swamp forests (Borneo)
- Sumatran freshwater swamp forests (Sumatra)
- Sumatran lowland rain forests (Sumatra, Nias, Bangka)
- Sumatran montane rain forests (Sumatra)
- Sumatran peat swamp forests (Sumatra)
- Sundaland heath forests (Borneo, Bangka, Belitung)
- Western Java montane rain forests (Java)
- Western Java rain forests (Java)

==== Tropical and subtropical coniferous forests ====
- Sumatran tropical pine forests (Sumatra)

==== Mangroves ====
- Sunda Shelf mangroves (Borneo, Sumatra, Riau Islands)

=== Wallacea bioregion ===
==== Tropical and subtropical moist broadleaf forests ====
- Banda Sea Islands moist deciduous forests (Banda Islands, Kai Islands, Tanimbar Islands, Babar Islands, Leti Islands, eastern Barat Daya Islands)
- Buru rain forests (Buru)
- Halmahera rain forests (Halmahera, Morotai, Obi Islands, Bacan Island)
- Seram rain forests (Seram, Ambon Island, Saparua, Gorong Islands)
- Sulawesi lowland rain forests (Sulawesi, Banggai Islands, Sula Islands, Sangihe Islands, Talaud Islands)
- Sulawesi montane rain forests (Sulawesi)

==== Tropical and subtropical dry broadleaf forests ====
- Lesser Sundas deciduous forests (Lombok, Sumbawa, Komodo, Flores, Alor)
- Sumba deciduous forests (Sumba)
- Timor and Wetar deciduous forests (Timor, Wetar)

=== New Guinea bioregion ===
==== Tropical and subtropical moist broadleaf forests ====
- Biak–Numfoor rain forests
- Central Range montane rain forests
- Northern New Guinea lowland rain and freshwater swamp forests
- Northern New Guinea montane rain forests
- Southern New Guinea freshwater swamp forests
- Southern New Guinea lowland rain forests
- Vogelkop montane rain forests
- Vogelkop–Aru lowland rain forests
- Yapen rain forests

==== Tropical and subtropical grasslands, savannas, and shrublands ====
- Trans-Fly savanna and grasslands

==== Montane grasslands and shrublands ====
- Central Range sub-alpine grasslands

==== Mangrove ====
- New Guinea mangroves

== Freshwater ==
=== Sunda Shelf and the Philippines bioregion ===
==== Montane Freshwaters ====
- Borneo Highlands

==== Tropical and Subtropical coastal rivers ====
- Aceh
- Central & Eastern Java
- Eastern Borneo
- Indian Ocean Slope of Sumatra & Java
- Kapuas
- Malay Peninsula Eastern Slope
- Northeastern Borneo
- Northern Central Sumatra - Western Malaysia
- Northern Philippine Islands
- Northwestern Borneo
- Southeastern Borneo
- Southern Central Sumatra
- Southern Sumatra - Western Java

=== Wallacea bioregion ===
==== Montane Freshwaters ====
- Lake Poso
- Matano - Southern Malili Lakes

==== Tropical and subtropical coastal rivers ====
- Lesser Sunda Islands
- Maluku; (Indonesia)
- Sulawesi

=== New Guinea bioregion ===
==== Montane Freshwaters ====
- New Guinea Central Mountains
- New Guinea North Coast

==== Tropical and subtropical coastal rivers ====
- Southwest New Guinea - Trans-Fly Lowland
- Vogelkop - Bomberai

== Marine ==
=== Western Indo-Pacific ===
==== Andaman ====
- Western Sumatra

=== Central Indo-Pacific ===
==== Sunda Shelf ====
- Sunda Shelf/Java Sea
- Malacca Strait

==== Java Transitional ====
- Southern Java

==== Western Coral Triangle ====
- Palawan/North Borneo
- Sulawesi Sea/Makassar Strait
- Halmahera
- Papua
- Banda Sea
- Lesser Sunda
- Northeast Sulawesi

==== Sahul Shelf ====
- Arafura Sea
