= Eastern Java–Bali montane rain forests =

Ecoregion in Eastern Java and Bali

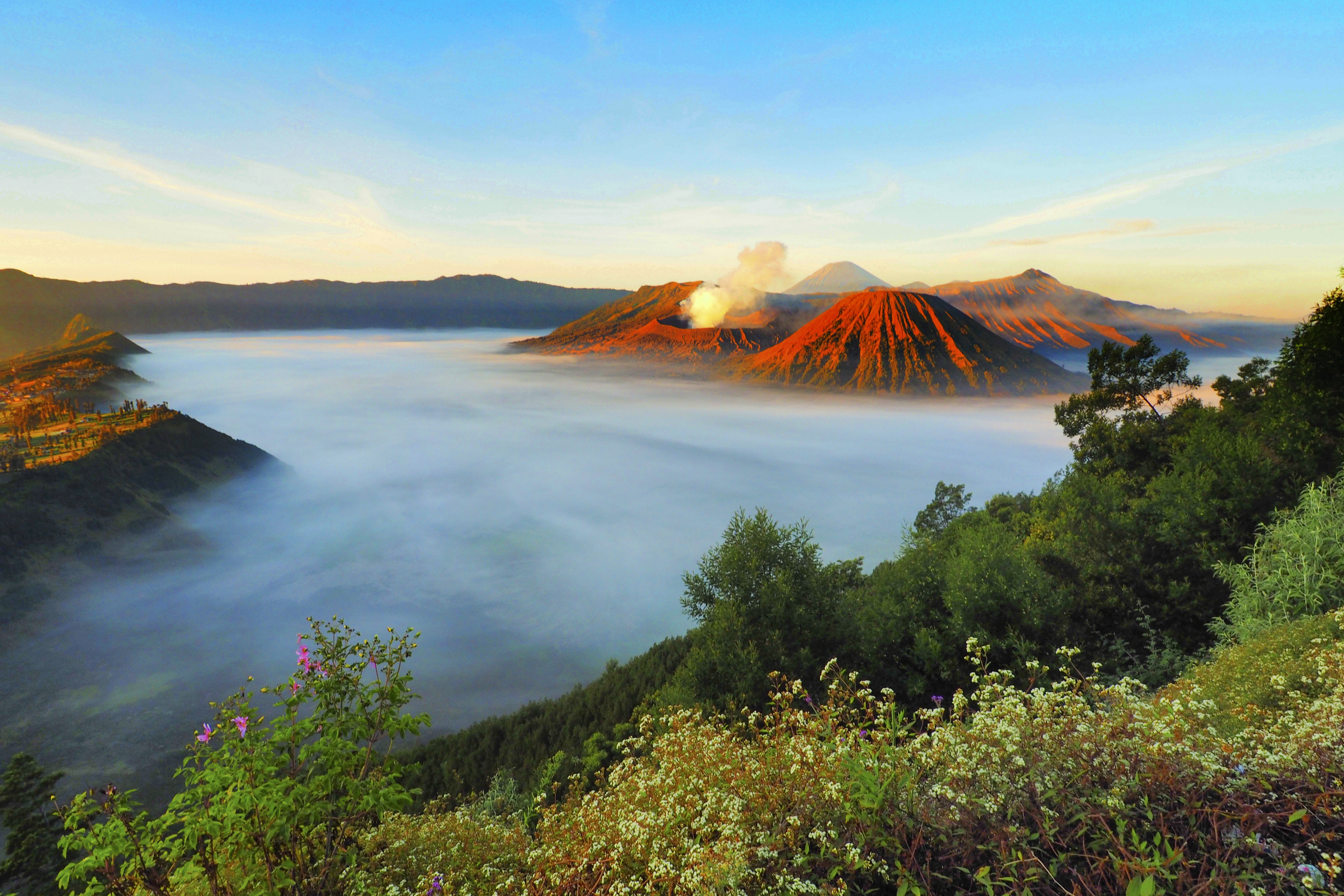
- Bromo Mountains, Bromo Tengger Semeru National Park

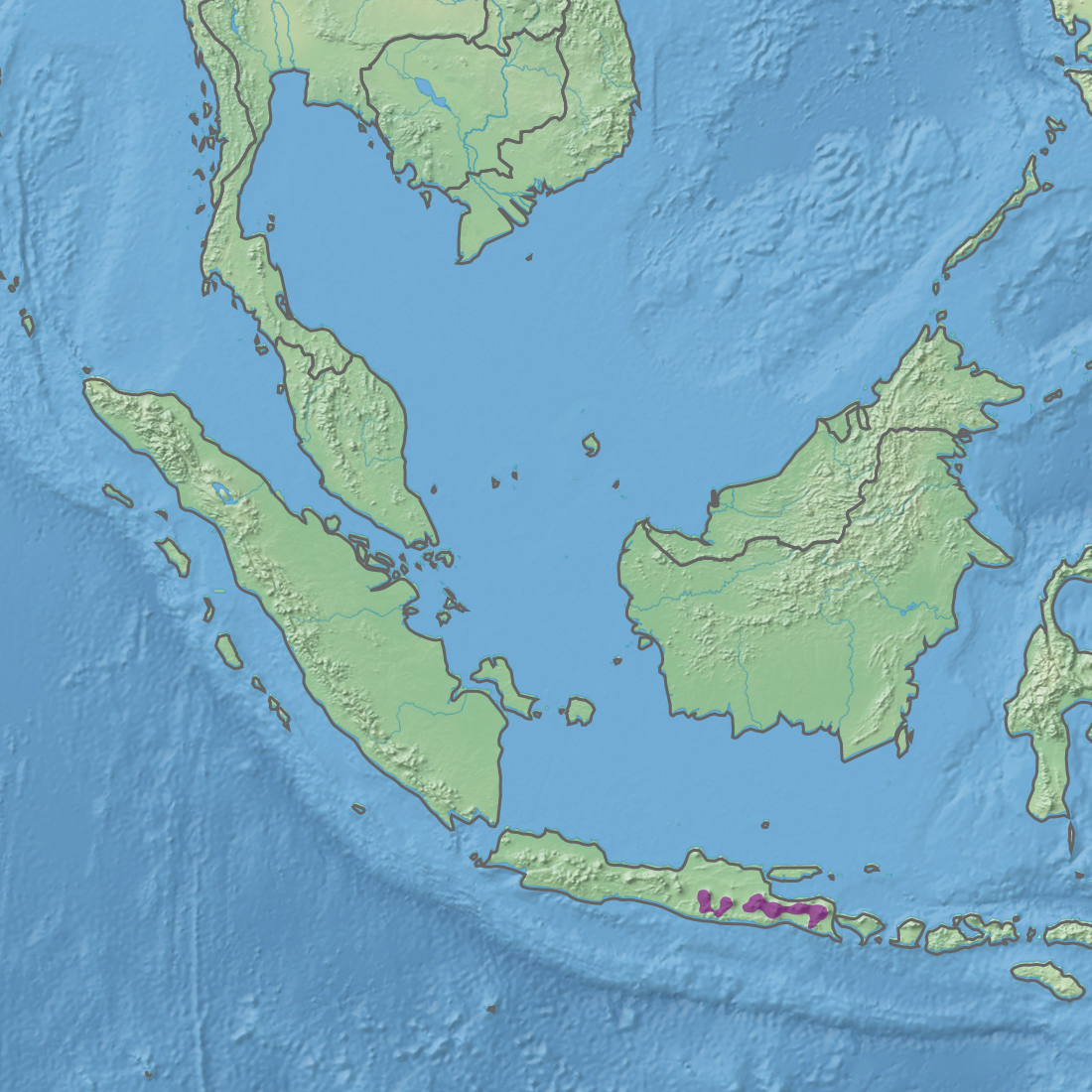
- Ecoregion territory (in purple)

Ecology
- Realm: Indomalayan
- Biome: Tropical and subtropical moist broadleaf forests
- Borders: Eastern Java–Bali rain forests

Geography
- Area: 15,932 km^{2} (6,151 sq mi)
- Country: Indonesia
- Coordinates: 8.25°S 115.25°E

Conservation
- Protected: 7.4%

The Eastern Java–Bali montane rain forests ecoregion (WWF ID: IM0112) covers the higher elevation mountain rainforests on the eastern side of the island of Java, and most of the center of the island of Bali in Indonesia. The region has a number of active volcanoes, but is under pressure from growing human populations pushing into higher elevations and more marginal land. With elevations rising from sea level to 3,426 metres (11,240 ft), and precipitation varying between rainforest and drier forest levels, the area has many different forest types – evergreen, deciduous and semi-alpine.

== Location and description ==
The islands of Java and Bali are the products of relatively recent volcanism – Java is less than 24 million years old, and Bali less than 3 million years. During recent ice ages when sea levels were lower the islands were connected to Sumatra and Borneo. There are 20 volcanoes on the islands that have been active during human history. The geology is volcanic rock, alluvial soils, and some areas of uplifted coral limestone. The ecoregion is surrounded by the lower elevation Eastern Java-Bali rain forests ecoregion.

== Climate ==
The climate of the ecoregion is Tropical monsoon climate (Köppen climate classification (Am)). This climate is characterized by relatively even temperatures throughout the year (all months being greater than 18 °C (64 °F) average temperature), and a pronounced dry season. The driest month has less than 60 mm of precipitation, but more than (100-(average/25)) mm. This climate is mid-way between a tropical rainforest and a tropical savannah. The dry month usually at or right after the winter solstice in the Southern Hemisphere.

== Flora and fauna ==
The forest types in the ecoregion are driven by four main factors: elevation, soil, aspect (shape/slope of the terrain), and precipitation. At lower elevations (below about 1,000 meters), the forest types are evergreen rainforest and moist deciduous. Typical tree species in the evergreen rainforest are Artocarpus elasticus (Artocarpus from the Greek 'bread' and 'fruit'), yellow mahogany (Epicharis parasitica), longkong (Lansium parasiticum, a member of the mahogany family that has commercially edible nuts), and Planchonia valida. 60% of the ecoregion is closed broadleaf evergreen forest.

Typical trees of the deciduous forests are Homalium tomentosum, silk trees (Albizia lebbekoides), reonja (Acacia leucophloea, a short tree with white flowers), the golden shower tree (Cassia fistula), and white siris (Ailanthus integrifolia). From 1,000 meters to about 1,800 meters the montane forests feature trees of Lithocarpus, Quercus, Castanopsis, and Lauraceae. The upper montane forest features extensive heath Ericaceae, with widespread moss.

Over 100 mammal species are known in the ecoregion. The mammals include the vulnerable Javan tailless fruit bat (Megaerops kusnotoi), which is near-endemic, and the Javan leopard (Panthera pardus melas).

215 species of birds have been recorded, 15 of which are endemic or near-endemic. Endemic and limited range species include the Javan hawk-eagle (Spizaetus bartelsi), pink-headed fruit dove (Ptilinopus porphyreus), dark-backed imperial pigeon (Ducula lacernulata), Javan owlet (Glaucidium castanopterum), Salvadori's nightjar (Caprimulgus pulchellus) Flame-fronted barbet (Megalaima armillaris), rufous-tailed fantail (Rhipidura phoenicura), white-bellied fantail (Rhipidura euryura), Sunda minivet (Pericrocotus miniatus), Javan bulbul (Ixos virescens), Javan grey-throated white-eye (Lophozosterops javanicus), Sunda warbler (Phylloscopus grammiceps), rufous-fronted laughingthrush (Garrulax rufifrons), white-bibbed babbler (Stachyris thoracica), crescent-chested babbler (Cyanoderma melanothorax), grey-cheeked tit-babbler (Mixornis flavicollis), white-flanked sunbird (Aethopyga eximia), and Indonesian serin (Chrysocorythus estherae orientalis).

== Protected areas ==
Only 7.4% of the ecoregion is officially protected. Notable protected areas include:

- Bromo Tengger Semeru National Park, in East Java, centered on the active volcano Mount Bromo.
- Meru Betiri National Park, in East Java, reaching down to the seacoast where it protects the nesting grounds of endangered turtles.

== See also ==
- Eastern Java–Bali rain forests
