= Eastern Java–Bali rain forests =

Ecoregion in Eastern Java and Bali

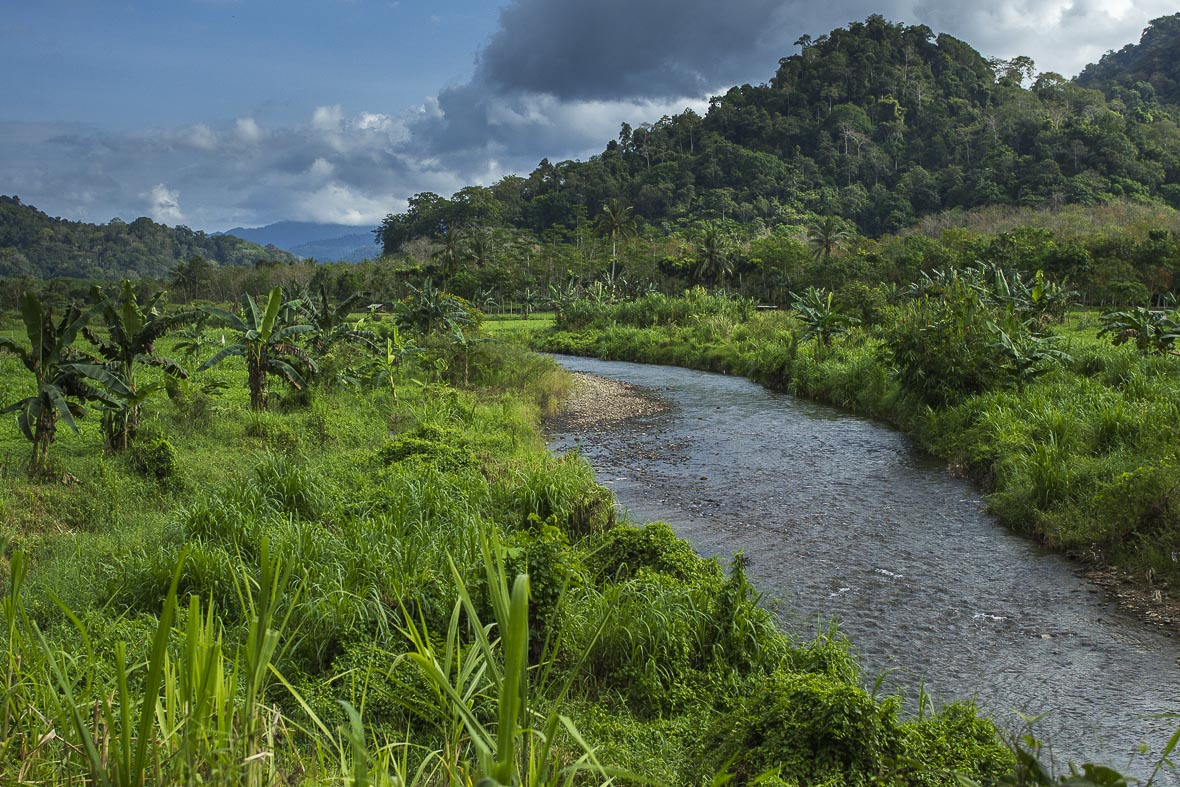
- Meru Betiri National Park

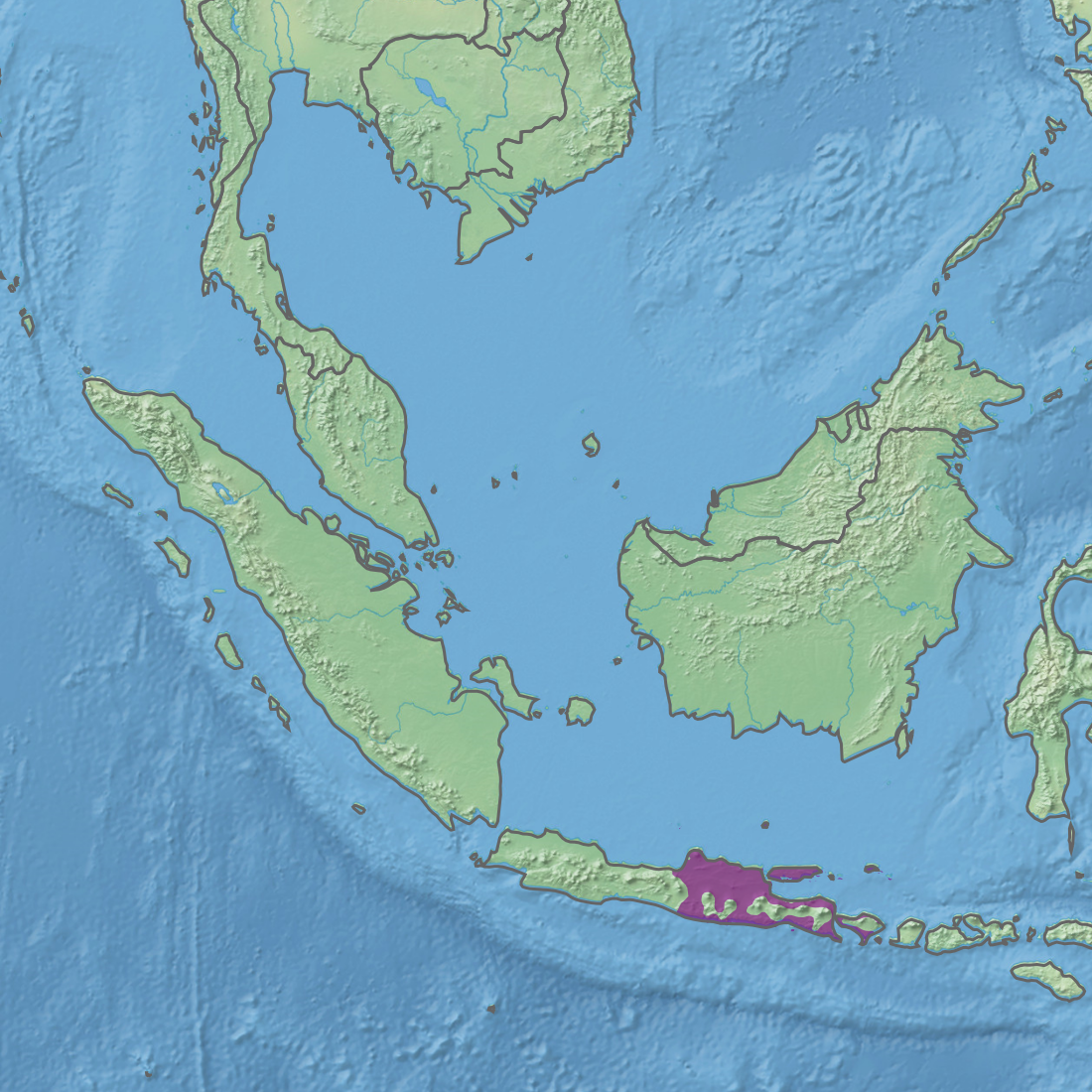
- Ecoregion territory (in purple)

Ecology
- Realm: Indomalayan
- Biome: Tropical and subtropical moist broadleaf forests
- Borders: Eastern Java–Bali montane rain forests; Western Java rain forests

Geography
- Area: 53,872 km^{2} (20,800 sq mi)
- Country: Indonesia
- Coordinates: 6.25°S 110.75°E

Conservation
- Protected: 2.5%

The Eastern Java-Bali rain forests ecoregion (WWF ID: IM0113) covers the lowland areas of the eastern half of the island of Java, and the island of Bali, in Indonesia. This ecoregion is distinct from the Eastern Java-Bali montane rain forests, which exists at higher elevations where mountain forest habitat dominates. Very little of the natural lowland rainforest remains in its pre-human settlement state.

Category:Ecoregion

== Location and description ==
The ecoregion covers the lowlands of the eastern half of Java and Bali. Also included are Madura Island and the Kangean Islands off the north coast of Java. The soil is mostly volcanic and alluvial deposits due to the large, active volcanoes in the center, and with some uplifted coral limestone.

== Climate ==
The climate of the ecoregion is Tropical monsoon climate (Köppen climate classification (Am)). This climate is characterized by relatively even temperatures throughout the year (all months being greater than 18 °C (64 °F) average temperature), and a pronounced dry season. The driest month has less than 60 mm of precipitation, but more than (100-(average/25)) mm. This climate is mid-way between a tropical rainforest and a tropical savannah. The dry month usually at or right after the winter solstice in the Southern Hemisphere.

== Flora and fauna ==
About 25% of the region is closed forest, 25% open forest, 35% cultivated/agricultural, and the rest urban or built up. Precipitation levels determine much of the forest character. Through the inland lowlands, the forests are moist deciduous, with 1,500–4,000 mm of precipitation per year and with a four-six months of dry season. Because precipitation levels decline towards the east of Java, these forests are not as wet as in the west. Typical trees in these moist deciduous forests include Homalium tomentosum, silk trees (Albizia lebbekoides), and reonja (Acacia leucophloea), a 20–30 foot tree with yellow flowers.

Along the southern coast of the ecoregion are semi-evergreen rain forests, with higher precipitation levels and only two-four months of dry season. Common south coast trees include (Artocarpus elasticus) (of the mulberry family), Yellow mahogany (Epicharis parasitica) and Duku (Lansium parasiticum). Along the northern coast precipitation levels are dryer (below 1,500 mm/year and with more than six months of dry season), resulting in a dry deciduous forest.

Scientists in the ecoregion have recorded 103 species of mammals, notable 15 species of ecologically important fruit bats that provide pollination. Over 350 species of birds have been recorded.

== Protected areas ==
Less than 3% of this ecoregion is officially protected. Notable protected areas include:

- West Bali National Park
- Meru Betiri National Park
- Alas Purwo National Park
- Baluran National Park
- Karimunjawa National Park

== See also ==
- Eastern Java–Bali montane rain forests
