= Western Java rain forests =

Ecoregion in Java, Indonesia

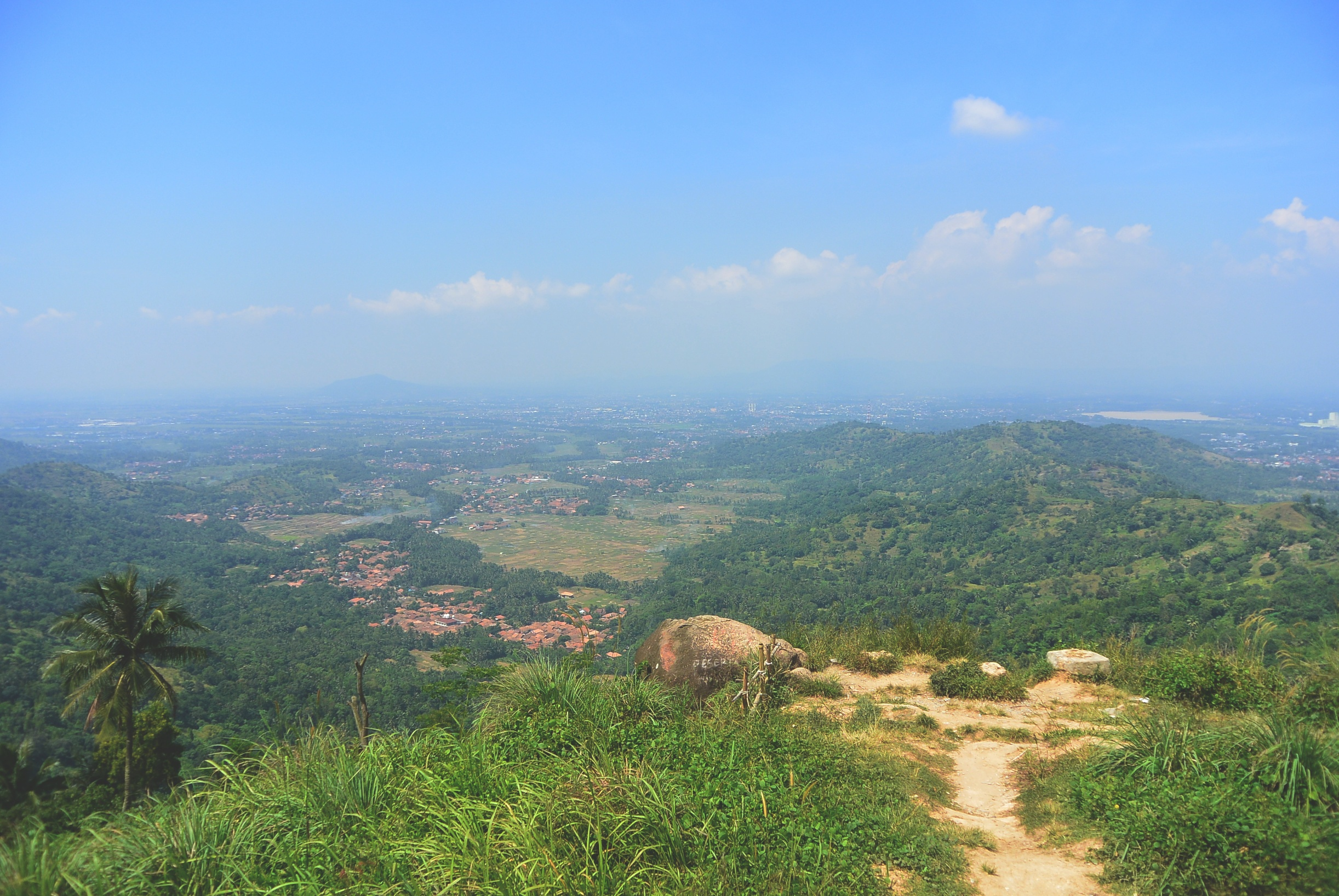
- Near the Port of Merak

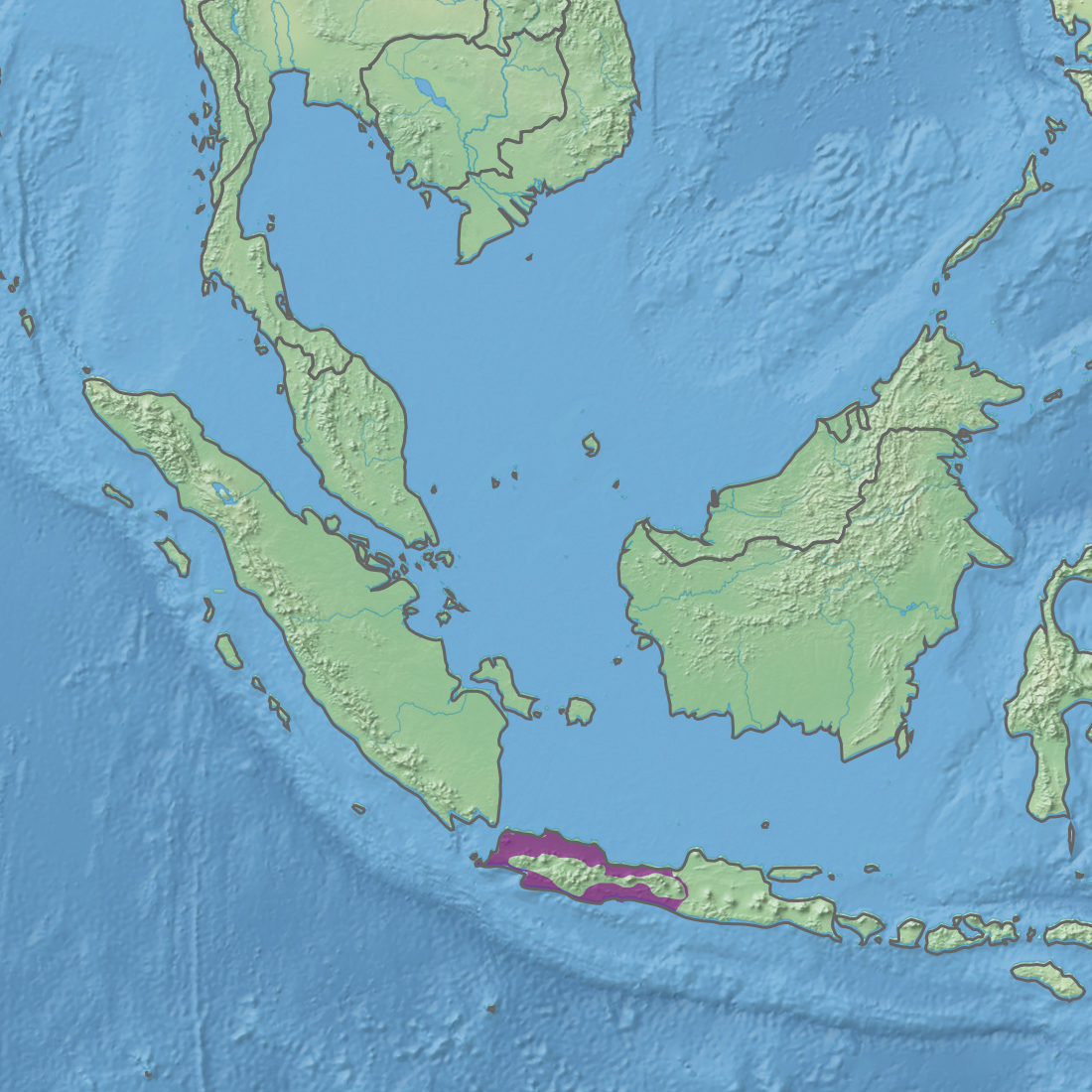
- Ecoregion territory (in purple)

Ecology
- Realm: Indomalayan
- Biome: Tropical and subtropical moist broadleaf forests
- Borders: Eastern Java–Bali rain forests; Western Java montane rain forests

Geography
- Area: 41,752 km^{2} (16,121 sq mi)
- Country: Indonesia
- Coordinates: 6.25°S 107.25°E

Conservation
- Protected: 2%

The Western Java rain forests ecoregion (World Wildlife Fund ID: IM0168) covers the lowland rain forests below 1,000 meters in elevation in the western half of the island of Java in Indonesia. There are a variety of forest types - evergreen, semi-evergreen, moist deciduous, and even some patches of freshwater swamp. The forests have degraded by conversion of the low areas to agriculture, and by logging. National parks protect some of the last remaining untouched rain forest. A number of endangered mammals are found in the ecoregion, including the Javan rhinoceros, the silvery gibbon, and the Javan surili.

== Location and description ==
The ecoregion surrounds the interior volcanic mountain ridge of western Java, stretching 500 km in length but nowhere more than 60 km wide. Above 1,000 meters in elevation the ecoregion transitions into the Western Java montane rain forests ecoregion.

== Climate ==
The climate of the ecoregion is Tropical monsoon climate (Köppen climate classification (Am)). This climate is characterized by relatively even temperatures throughout the year (all months being greater than 18 °C (64 °F) average temperature), and a pronounced dry season. The driest month has less than 60 mm of precipitation, but more than (100-(average/25) mm. This climate is mid-way between a tropical rainforest and a tropical savannah.

== Flora ==
Almost 40% of the ecoregion is either under cultivation for agriculture or in built-urban areas. The remainder is 40% closed evergreen broadleaf forest, 14% open forest, and 6% other cover. The forest is, however, highly degraded by logging. The evergreen forest's common plants include Artocarpus elasticus (a tree in the mulberry family), yellow mahogany (Dysoxylum parasiticum), langsat (Lansium domesticum), and Planchonia valida (a tree in the Lecythidaceae family). The areas of moist deciduous forest generally have 1,500 to 4,000 mm/year of precipitation. These forests feature palmyra palm (genus Borassus) and palm trees of genus Corypha.

== Fauna ==
The ecoregion supports 101 species of mammals, five of which are endemic. Mammals of conservation interest include the critically endangered Javan rhinoceros (Rhinoceros sondaicus), the endangered silvery gibbon (Hylobates moloch), the endangered Javan surili (Presbytis comata), the vulnerable fishing cat (Prionailurus viverrinus), the endangered banteng (Bos javanicus), and the endangered Sunda slow loris (Nycticebus coucang).

== Protected areas ==
Only 2% of the ecoregion is officially protected. These protected areas include:

- Mount Ciremai National Park
- Mount Halimun Salak National Park
- Ujung Kulon National Park
