= Western Java montane rain forests =

Ecoregion (WWF) in Java, Indonesia

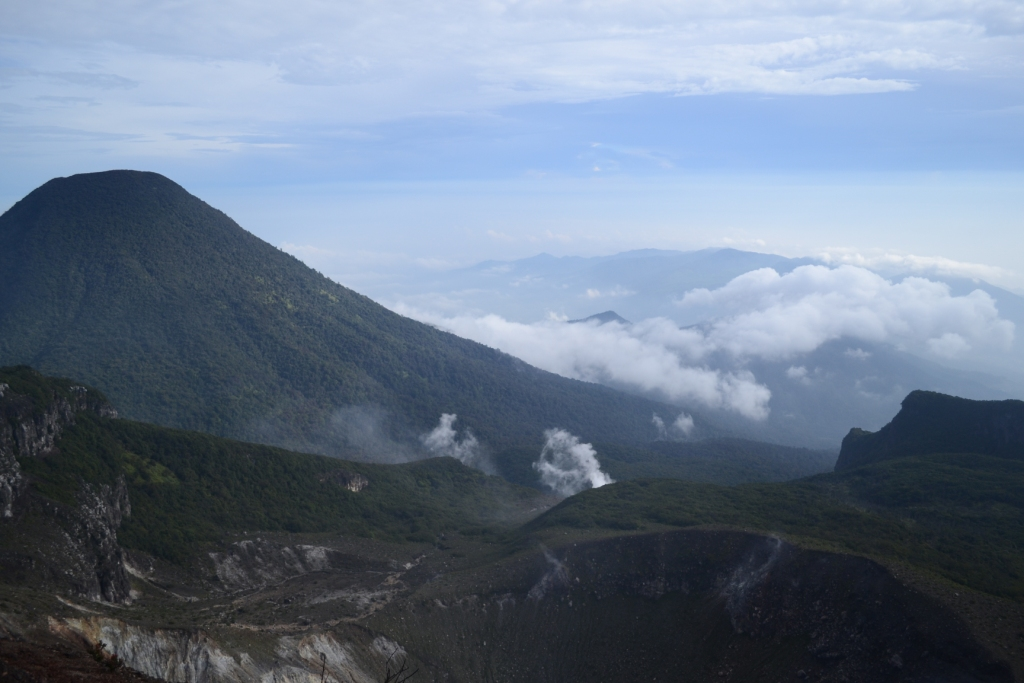
- Mount Gede Pangrango National Park

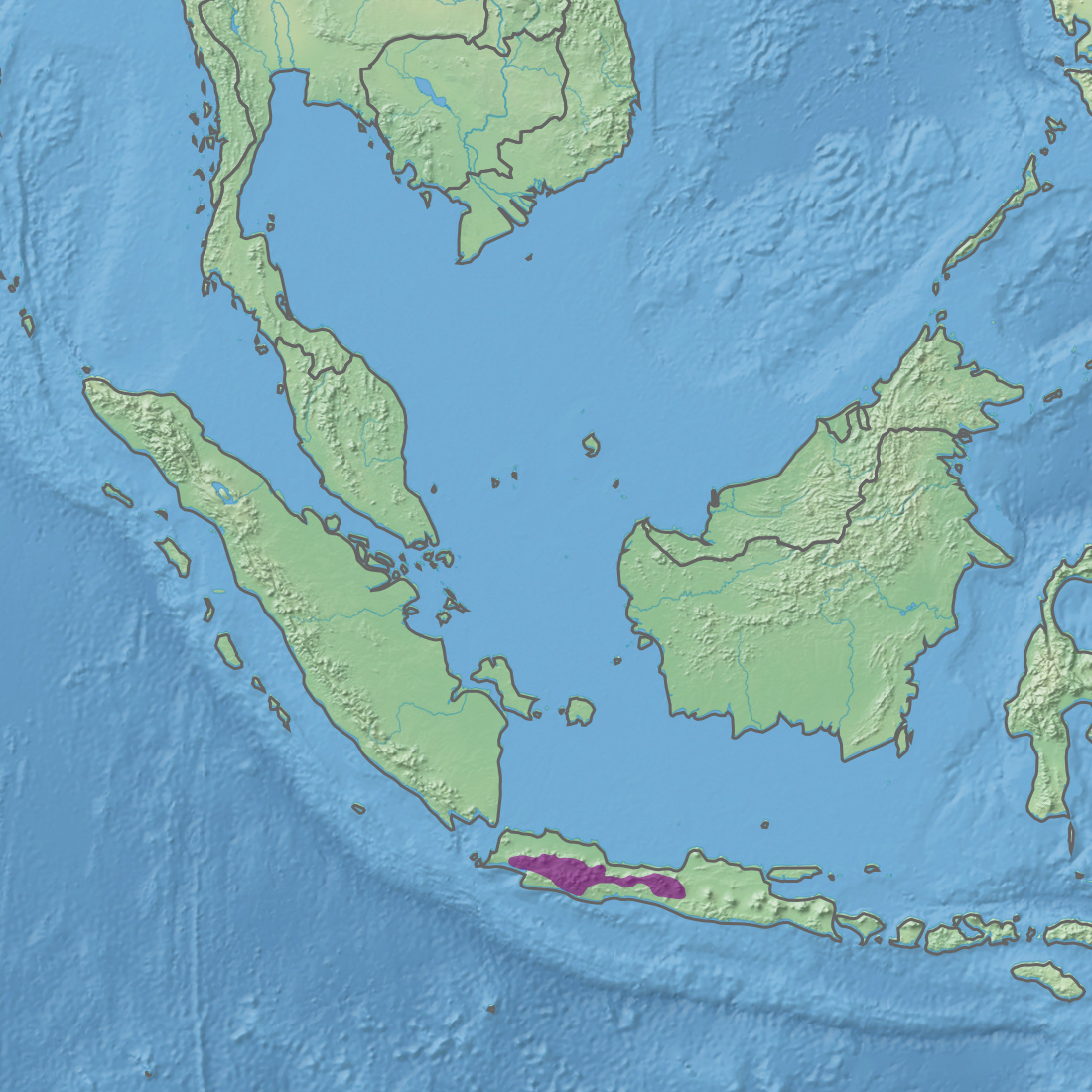
- Ecoregion territory (in purple)

Ecology
- Realm: Indomalayan
- Biome: Tropical and subtropical moist broadleaf forests
- Borders: Western Java rain forests

Geography
- Area: 26,342 km^{2} (10,171 sq mi)
- Country: Indonesia
- Coordinates: 7.25°S 107.75°E

Conservation
- Protected: 7.76%

The Western Java montane rain forests ecoregion (WWF ID: IM0167) covers the montane rain forest above 1,000 meters in the volcanic mountain ridges in the west of the island of Java in Indonesia. Several mammals and bird species are found only in this ecoregion, including the Javan mastiff bat (Otomops formosus) and the Volcano mouse (Mus vulcani). Only about one-fifth of the original rainforest remains in its original state, as human pressures are encroaching on the mountain slopes.

== Location and description ==
The ecoregion stretches 500 km from west to east across western and central Java. This mountainous region, historically known as Parahyangan, is only 30-80 km wide. Major volcanoes, from west to east, include Mount Salak, Mount Pangrango, Mount Guntur, Galunggung, Mount Cereme, Mount Slamet, Mount Sindoro, Mount Sumbing, and Mount Merbabu. The highest elevation is 3,428 metres (11,247 ft) at Mount Slamet. The ecoregion is completely surrounded by the Western Java rain forests ecoregion at lower elevations.

== Climate ==
The climate of the ecoregion is Tropical monsoon climate (Köppen climate classification (Am)). This climate is characterized by relatively even temperatures throughout the year (all months being greater than 18 °C (64 °F) average temperature), and a pronounced dry season. The driest month has less than 60 mm of precipitation, but more than (100-(average/25) mm. This climate is mid-way between a tropical rainforest and a tropical savannah.

== Flora and fauna ==
About 65% of the ecoregion is covered in closed forest, mostly broadleaf evergreen, an additional 20% is open forest. The evergreen forest includes Artocarpus elasticus, yellow mahogany (Epicharis parasitica), langsat (Lansium parasiticum), and Planchonia valida. Common montane tree species include Lithocarpus, Quercus, and Castanopsis species, as well as laurels. At higher elevations, characteristic species are heath (family Ericaceae) such as Rhododendron.

There are 64 species of mammals in the ecoregion, 16 of which are endemic. Mammals of conservation interest include the endangered Javan surili (Presbytis comata), the endangered Silvery gibbon (Hylobates moloch), and the critically endangered Javan leopard (Panthera pardus melas).

== Protected areas ==
Over 7% of the ecoregion is officially protected. These protected areas include:

- Mount Halimun Salak National Park
- Mount Gede Pangrango National Park
- Mount Ciremai National Park
- Mount Merbabu National Park
- Mount Merapi National Park
