= Stipule =

Appendage of a leaf in flowering plants

In botany, a stipule is an outgrowth typically borne on both sides (sometimes on just one side) of the base of a leafstalk (the petiole). They are primarily found among dicots and rare among monocots. Stipules are considered part of the anatomy of the leaf of a typical flowering plant, although in many species they may be inconspicuous —or sometimes entirely absent, and the leaf is then termed exstipulate. At the other end of the scale are species like Artocarpus elasticus where the stipules can be up to eight inches (twenty cm) in length. (In some older botanical writing, the term "stipule" was used more generally to refer to any small leaves or leaf-parts, notably prophylls.) The word stipule was coined by Linnaeus from Latin stipula, straw, stalk.

== Types of stipules ==
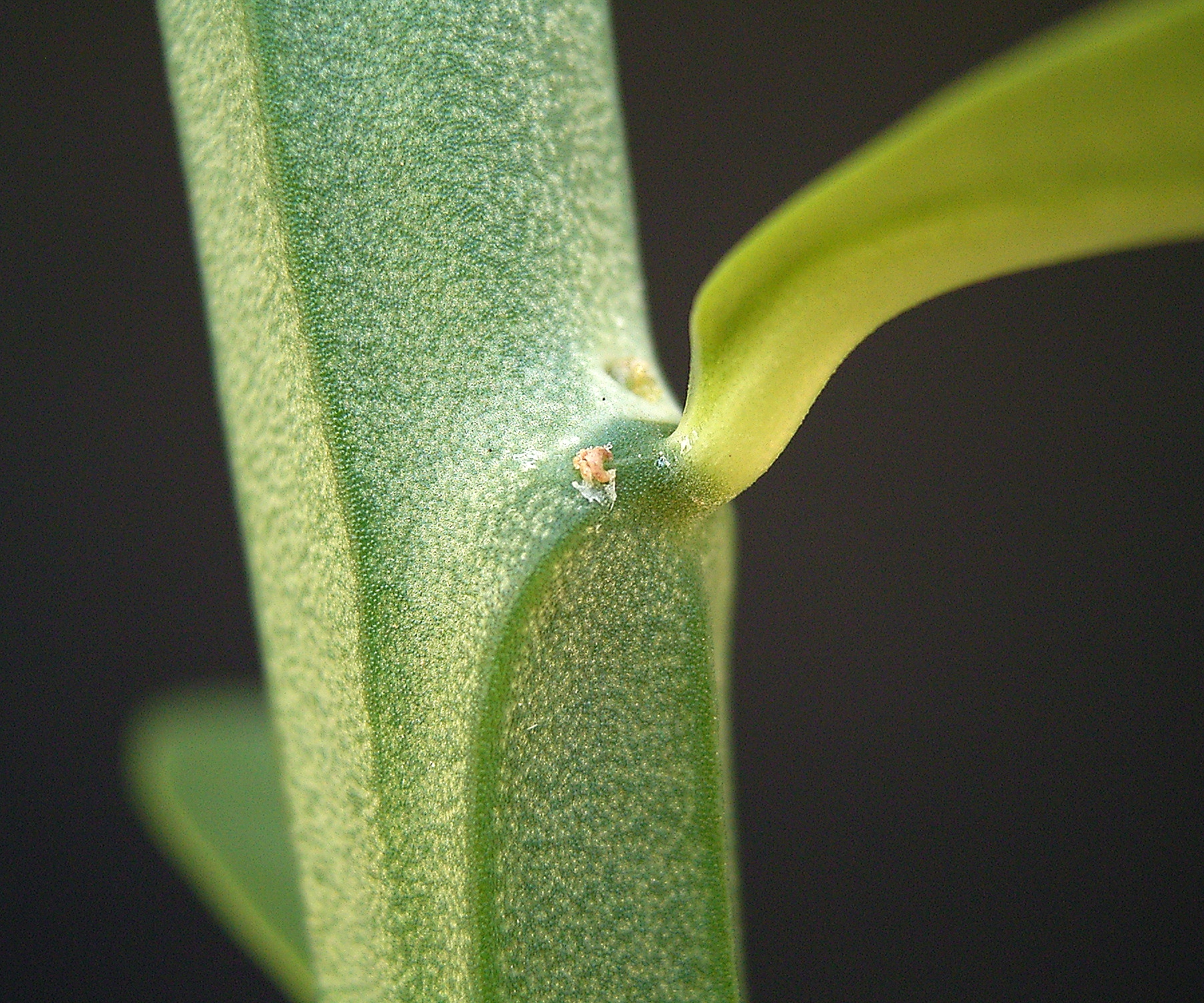
Glandular stipule of Euphorbia pteroneura

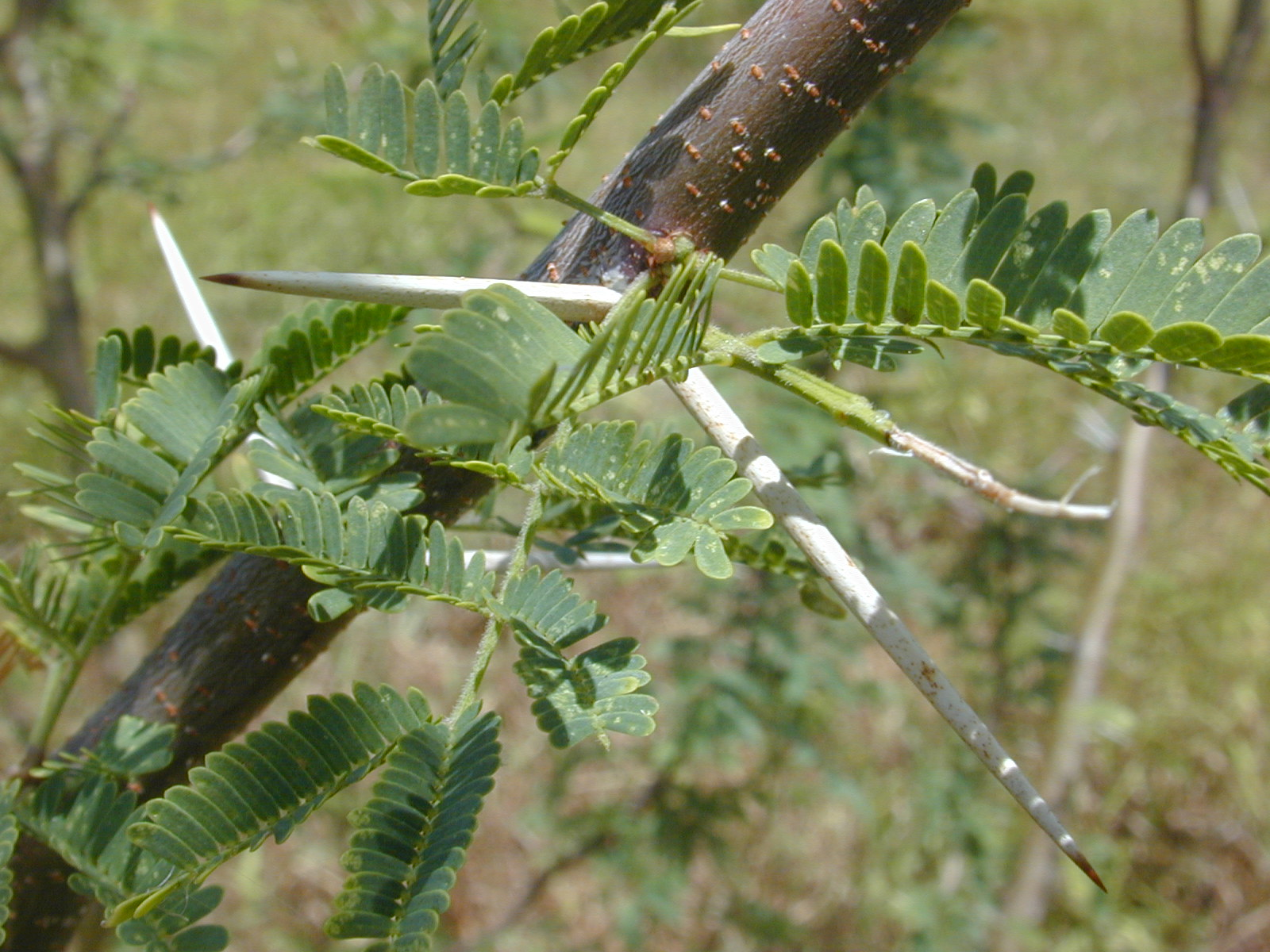
Stipular spines on the mesquite tree (Prosopis pallida)

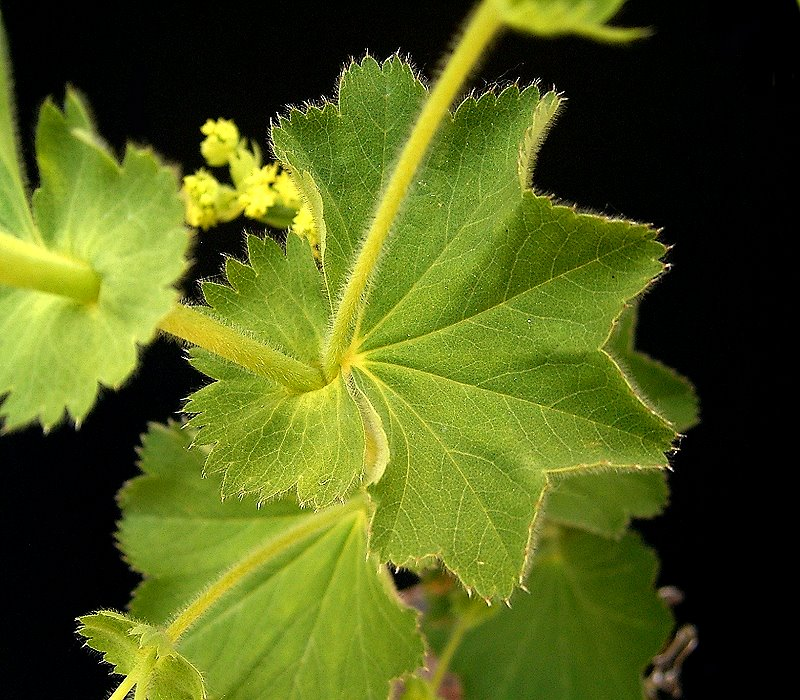
Fused together and leaf-like stipules of Alchemilla mollis

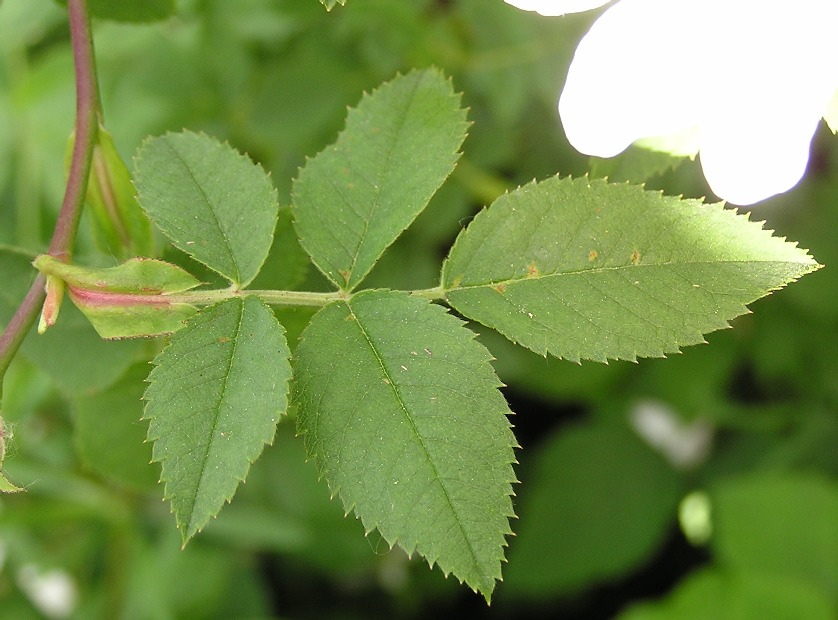
Leafy stipules at the base of a Rose leaf (Rosa canina)

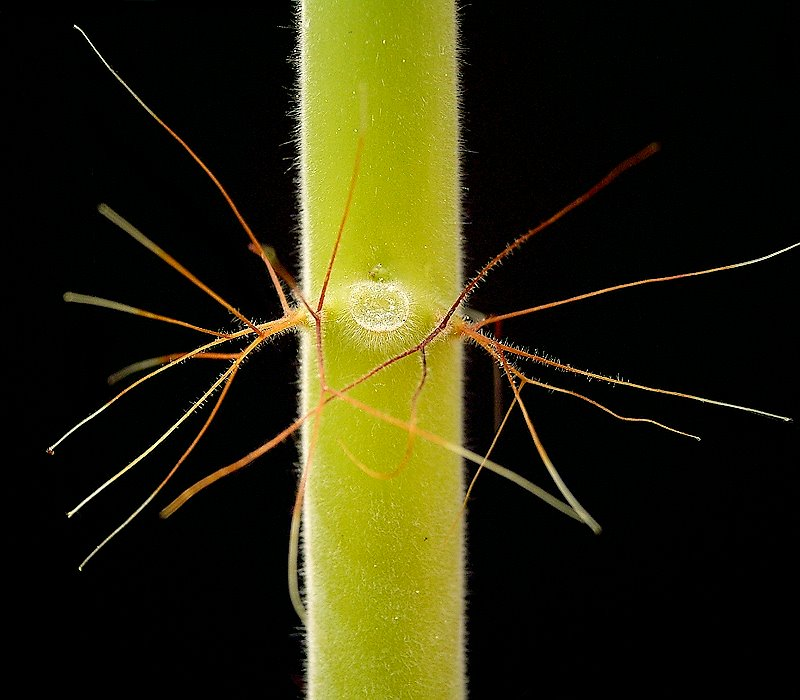
Stipules building glandular hairs on Jatropha spicata

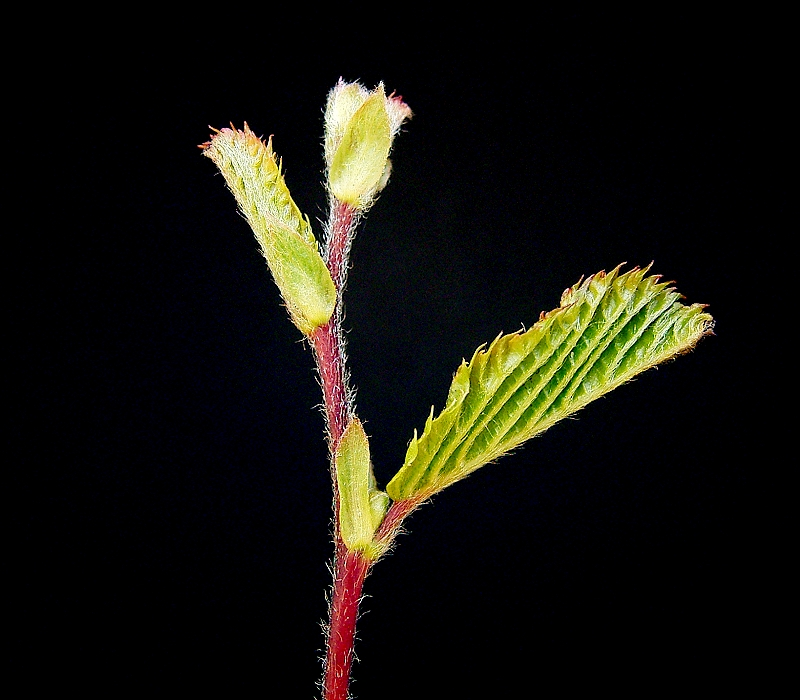
Stipules protecting young leaves of Carpinus betulus (European Hornbeam)

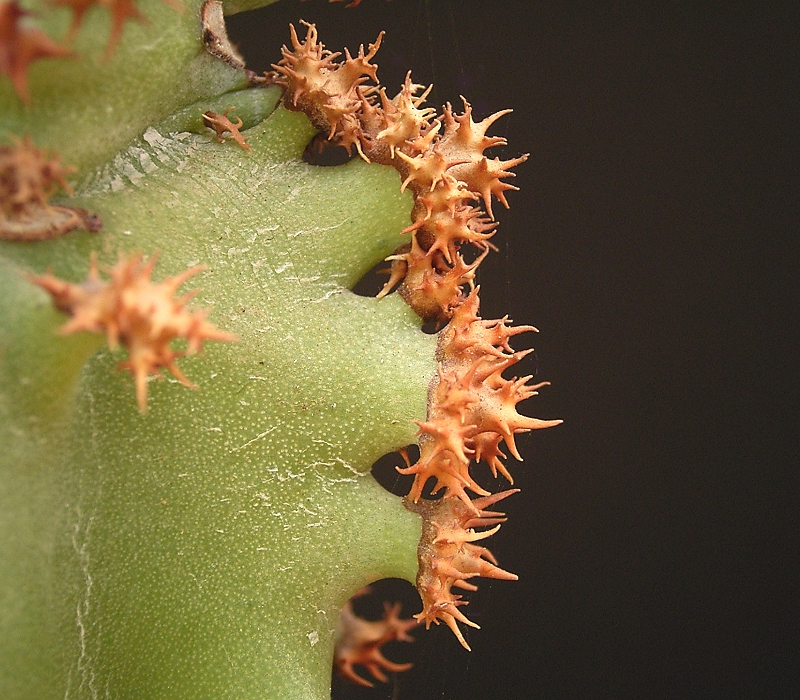
Stipular spine clusters of Euphorbia spectabilis

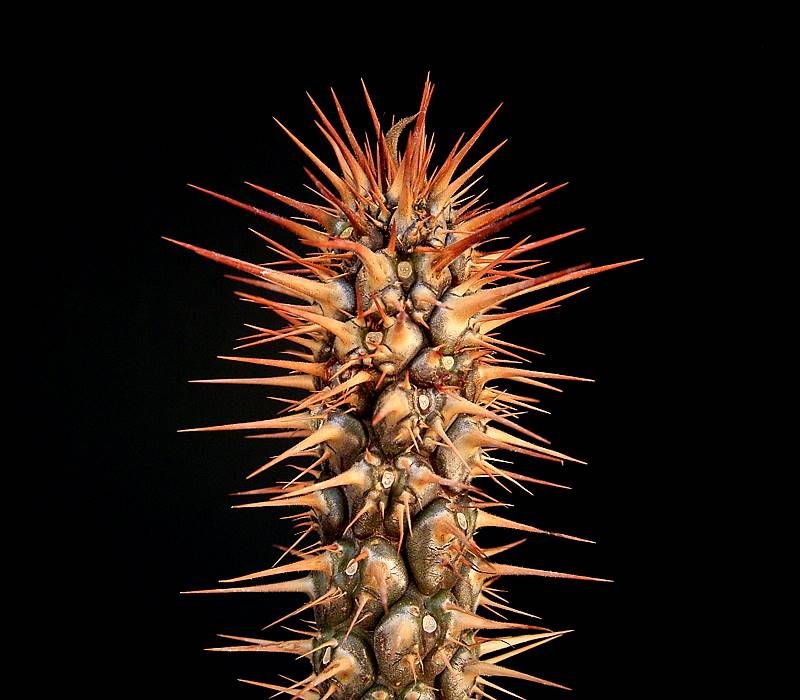
Stipular spines accompanied by prickles of Euphorbia didiereoides

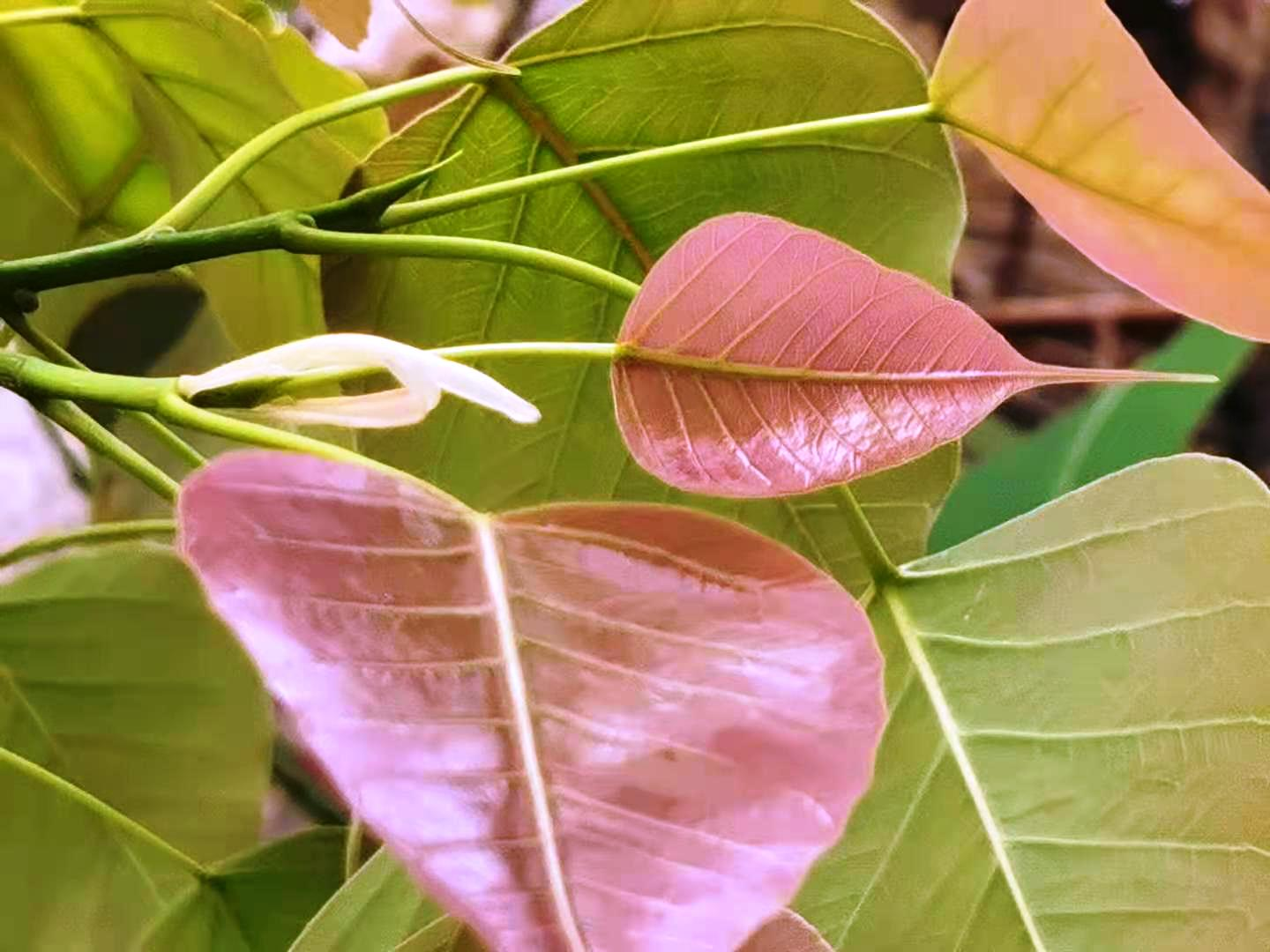
The stipule of Ficus religiosa. The white stipule contains a new leaf and a new stipule.

== General characteristics ==
The position of stipules on a plant varies widely from species to species, though they are often located near the base of a leaf. Stipules are most common on dicotyledons, where they appear in pairs alongside each leaf. Some monocotyledon plants display stipule-like structures, but only display one per leaf. A relationship exists between the anatomy of the stem node and the presence or absence of stipules: most plants with trilacunar nodes have stipules; species with unilacunar nodes lack stipules.

Stipules are morphologically variable and might appear as glands, scales, hairs, spines, or laminar (leaf-like) structures.

If a single stipule goes all the way around the stem, it is known as an ochrea.

== Types ==
=== According to duration ===
The three types of stipules according to duration are caducous, deciduous and persistent. Caducous stipules fall off before the leaf unfolds, while deciduous stipules fall off immediately after the leaf unfolds. Persistent stipules remain attached to the plant.

=== According to shape, size and position ===
Stipules can be considered free lateral, adnate, interpetiolar, intrapetiolar, ochreate, foliaceous, bud scales, tendrillar or spiny.

A stipule can be fused to the stem, or to the other stipule from the same node.

A stipule is "adnate" if it's fused together on part of the petiole length, but the anterior is still free.

A stipule is "interpetiolar" if it is located in between the petioles, as opposed to being attached to the petioles, and generally one stipule from each leaf is fused together, so it appears that there's just one stipule between each leaf.

A stipule is "intrapetiolar" if it is located in the angle that is between a stem and a petiole. In this case, the two stipules generally form together and appear to be one stipule.

A stipule is "ochreate" if a single stipule appears to be a solid tube that goes all the way around the stem.

A stipule is "foliaceous" if it is leaf-like. These are generally used to photosynthesize.

A stipule is considered a "bud scale" if it is hard or scaly and protects leaf buds as they form. These generally fall off as soon as the leaf unfolds.

A stipule is considered "tendrillar" if they are long thin tendrils, and are generally used by climbing plants.

A stipule is considered "spiny" if they are long and pointy. These are generally used to deter animals.

A stipule is considered to be "abaxial", "counter" or "leaf opposed" if it is located on the opposite side to where the leaf meets the stem.

== Purpose of stipules ==
Stipules have various functions. Some stipules are not well understood or may be vestigial.

It is known that foliaceous stipules are used like leaves to make energy for the plants. Sometimes stipules protect the next leaf or bud as it grows in then falls off after the leaf unfolds, as with Tulip Poplars. Stipules can be used as climbing tendrils by climbing plants. Spiny stipules can be used to help protect the plant from animals.
