= Quercus steenisii =

Conservation status
- Endangered (IUCN 3.1)

Scientific classification
- Kingdom: Plantae
- Clade: Embryophytes
- Clade: Tracheophytes
- Clade: Spermatophytes
- Clade: Angiosperms
- Clade: Eudicots
- Clade: Rosids
- Order: Fagales
- Family: Fagaceae
- Genus: Quercus
- Species: Q. steenisii

Binomial name
- Quercus steenisii Soepadmo (1966)

Species of plant

Quercus steenisii is a species of oak. It is a tree native to northern Sumatra.

Quercus steenisii is native to montane rain forests from 2,000 to 3,350 metres elevation. It is known from only two or three sites. The species' estimated extent of occurrence (EOO) is 1,123 km^{2}, and its area of occupancy (AOO) is 12 km^{2}. Its population is not well understood, and is presumed to be declining. It is threatened with habitat loss from land conversion and logging in its native range.
