= Sumatran tropical pine forests =

Terrestrial ecoregion on Sumatra

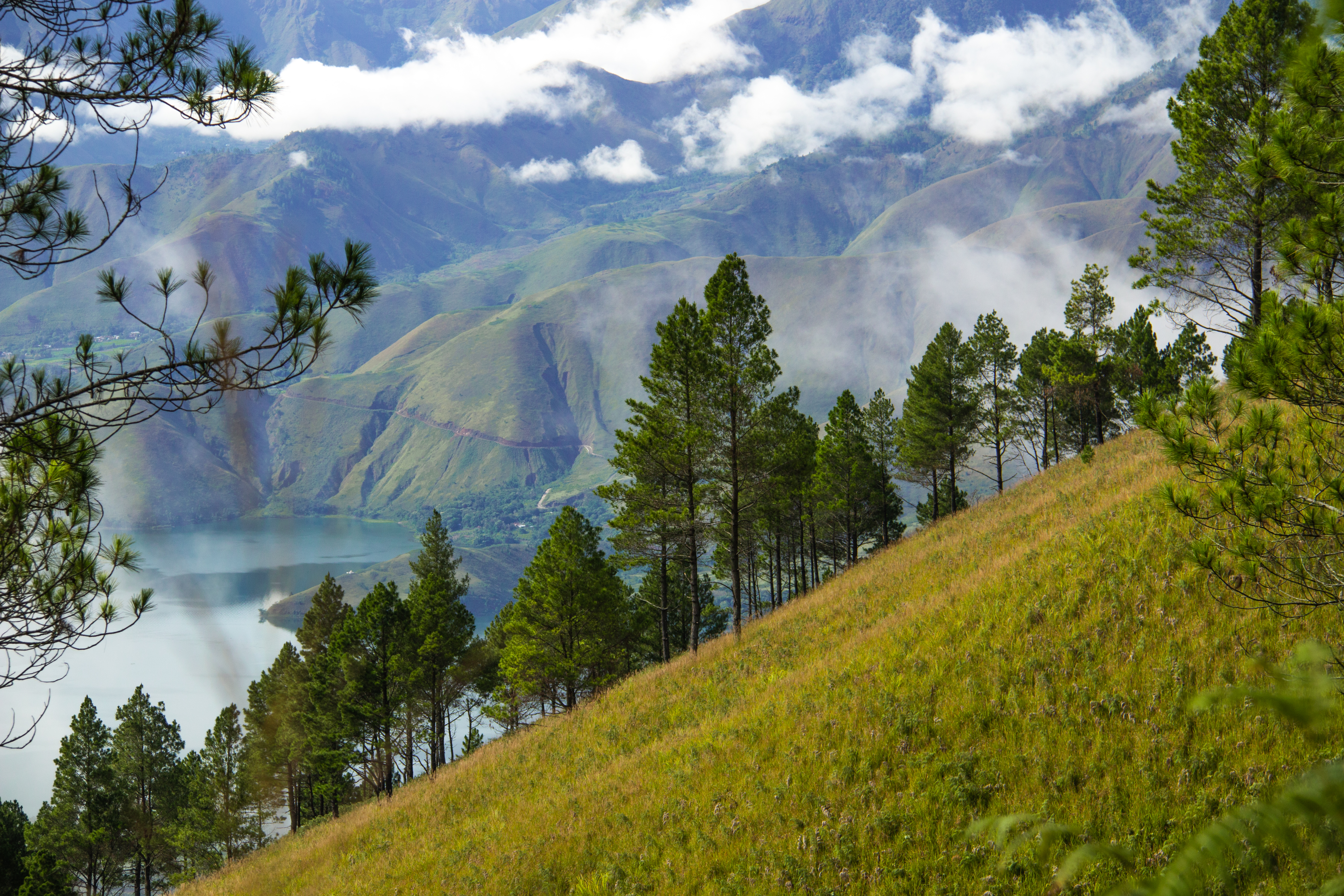
- Sumatran pine tree (Pinus merkusii) over Lake Toba

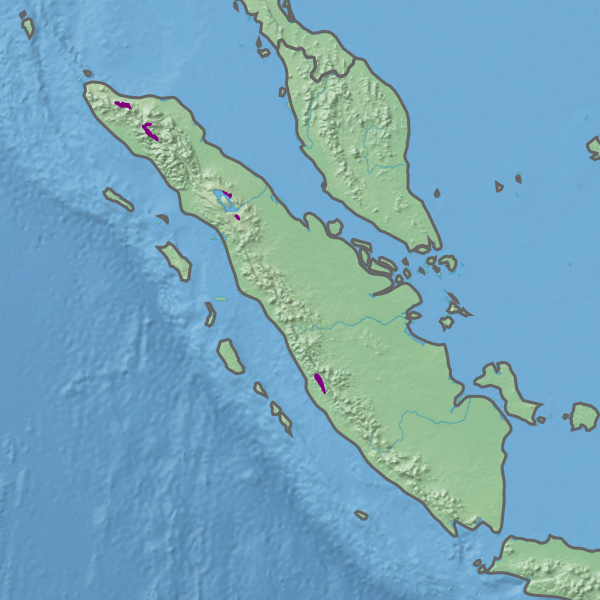
- Ecoregion territory (in purple)

Ecology
- Realm: Indomalayan
- Biome: tropical and subtropical coniferous forests
- Borders: Sumatran lowland rain forests; Sumatran montane rain forests

Geography
- Area: 2,748 km^{2} (1,061 mi^{2})
- Country: Indonesia

Conservation
- Conservation status: Vulnerable
- Protected: 1,090 km^{2} (40%)

The Sumatran tropical pine forests is a tropical coniferous forest ecoregion on the island of Sumatra in Indonesia.

== Location and description ==
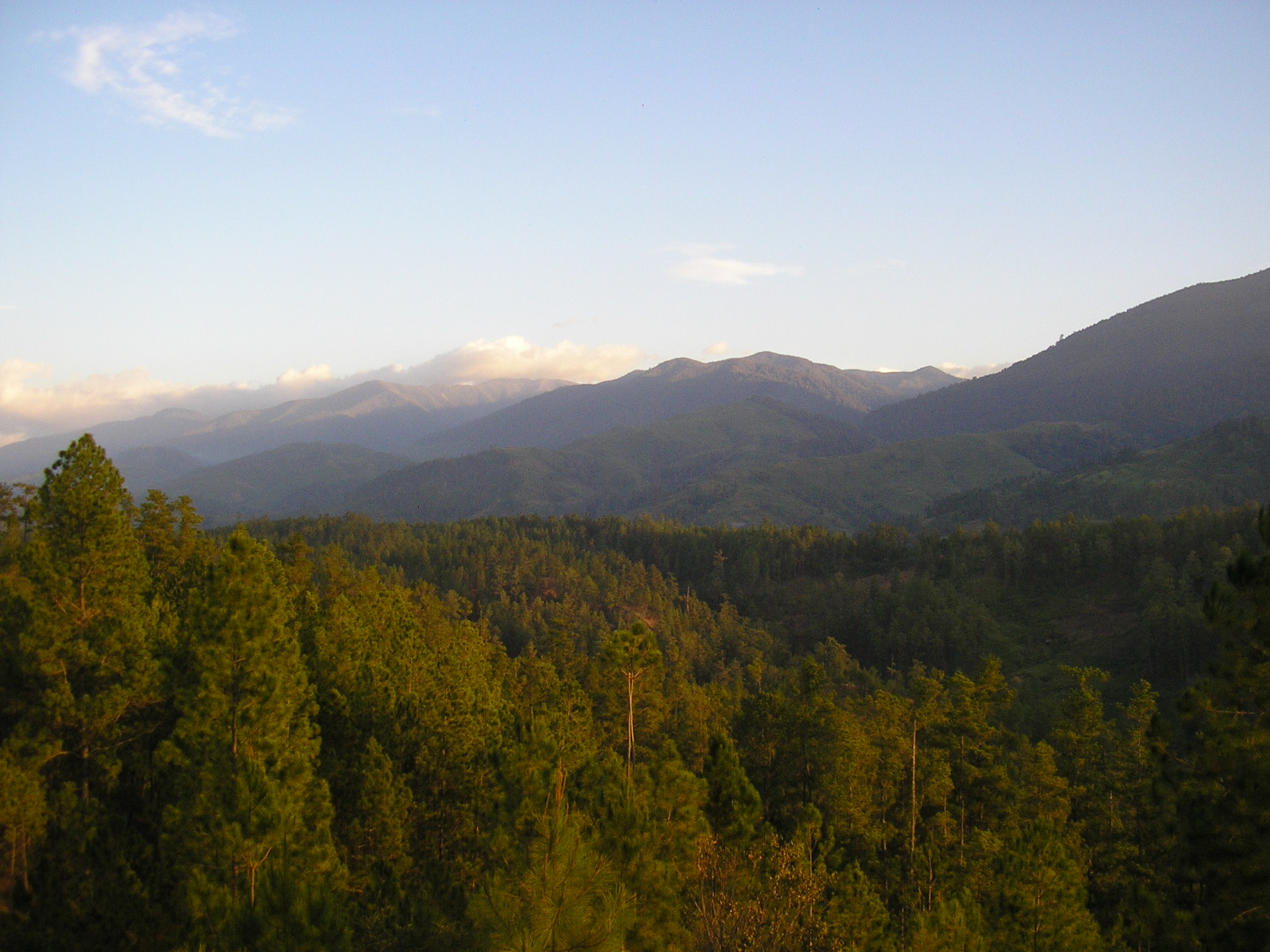
Pine forest in Gayo Lues, Aceh

These pine forests are found on the higher slopes of Sumatra, especially in the north of the island near Lake Toba and along the Barisan Mountains, including the tall Mount Leuser. With 2500mm of rainfall per year, the pine forests have a tropical rainforest climate but are drier than the thick rainforest areas lower down the slopes, especially on the drier eastern aspects of the mountains.

== Flora ==
This ecoregion is one of the rare areas of pine forest in the tropics with the dominant species Sumatran pine (Pinus merkusii), which has become established in areas where rainforest has been disturbed throughout history by events including landslides and forest fires, as well as human clearance. Forest fire is an ongoing and continuous feature of the life-cycle of the forest.

== Fauna ==
There is less wildlife here than in the rainforest that covers most of the island, and there are no endemic mammals, but there are still a number of near-endemic species, including birds like the Sunda robin.

== Threats and preservation ==
The pine forests of the higher areas are less vulnerable to clearance than the valuable hardwood rainforests lower down, and furthermore, a third of them are within the Kerinci Seblat and other national parks.

== See also ==
- List of ecoregions in Indonesia
