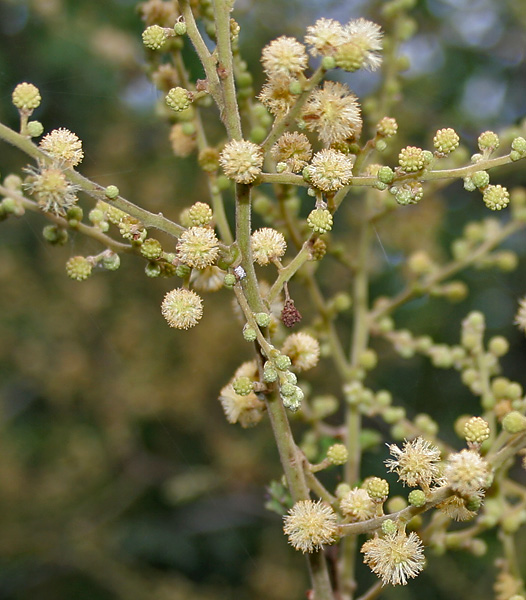

Scientific classification
- Kingdom: Plantae
- Clade: Tracheophytes
- Clade: Angiosperms
- Clade: Eudicots
- Clade: Rosids
- Order: Fabales
- Family: Fabaceae
- Subfamily: Caesalpinioideae
- Clade: Mimosoid clade
- Genus: Vachellia
- Species: V. leucophloea

Binomial name
- Vachellia leucophloea (Roxb.) Maslin, Seigler & Ebinger

Varieties
- Vachellia leucophloea var. leucophloea (Roxb.) Maslin, Seigler & Ebinger; Vachellia leucophloea var. microcephala (Kurz) Maslin, Seigler & Ebinger

Synonyms
- Acacia leucophloea (Roxb.) Willd.; Mimosa leucophloea Roxb.; Kuteera-gum

= Vachellia leucophloea =

Species of legume

Vachellia leucophloea (Hindi: रेवंजा Punjabi: ਰੇਰੂ), also vernacularly as the White Bark Acacia or reonja, is a moderate-sized tree native to South and Southeast Asia.

== Distribution ==
Vachellia leucophloea grows natively in India, Nepal, Pakistan, Sri Lanka, Myanmar, Thailand, Vietnam, and Indonesia.

== Medicinal uses ==
The bark extracts of Vachellia leucophloea are used in Pakistani traditional medicine as an astringent, a bitter, a thermogenic, a styptic, a preventive of infections, an anthelmintic, a vulnerary, a demulcent, an expectorant, an antipyretic, an antidote for snake bites and in the treatment of bronchitis, cough, vomiting, wounds, ulcers, diarrhea, dysentery, internal and external hemorrhages, dental caries, stomatitis, and intermittent fevers and skin diseases. An ethanolic extract ointment has shown marked wound healing activity in trials.

== Culinary uses ==
The bark is used to prepare a spirit from sugar and palm juice, and in times of scarcity it is ground and mixed with flour. The pods are used as a vegetable, and the seeds can be ground and mixed with flour.

== Other uses ==
The wood is sometimes used to make attractive furniture and other implements, though it can be difficult to work with and is not durable.

== Gallery ==
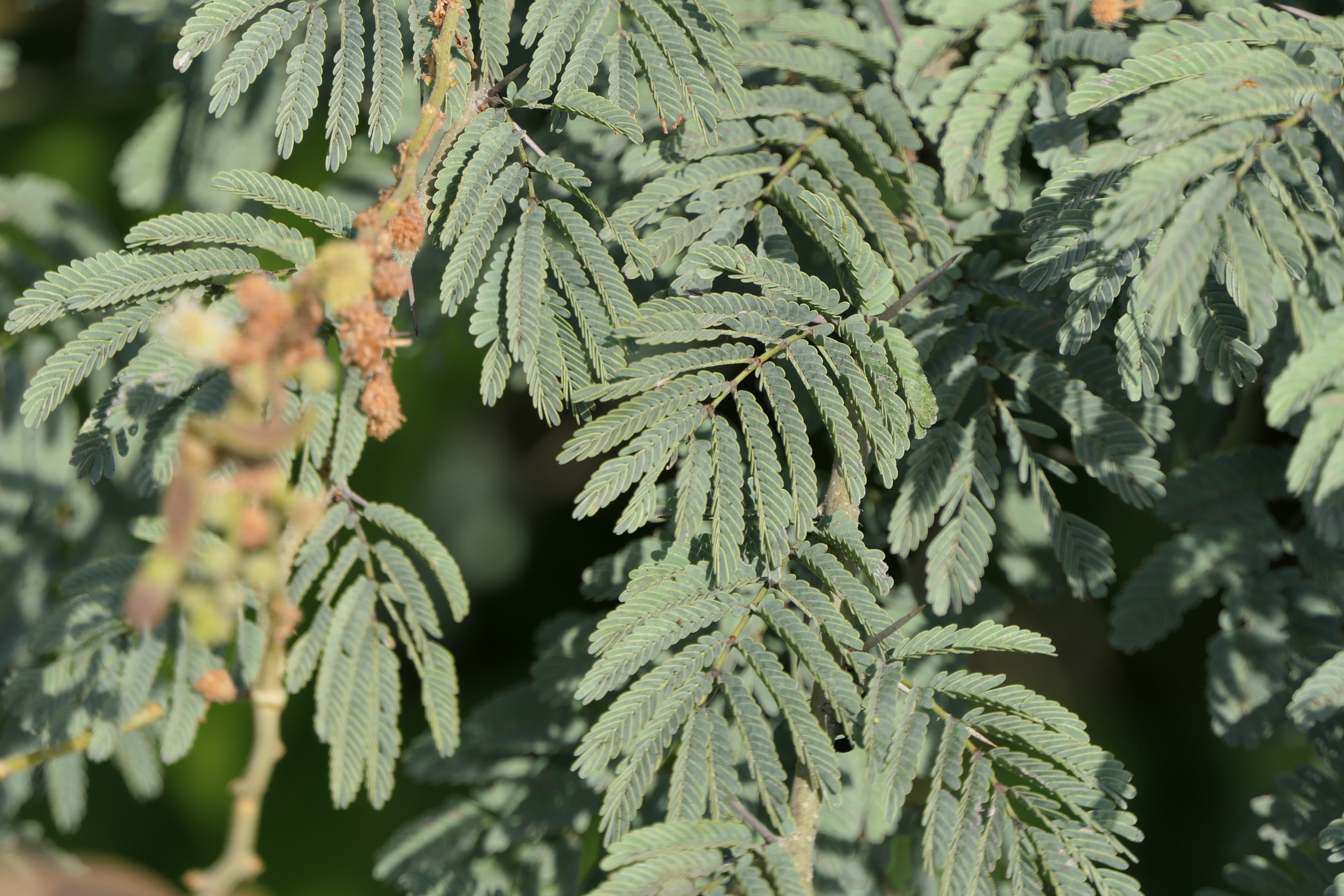
Foliage

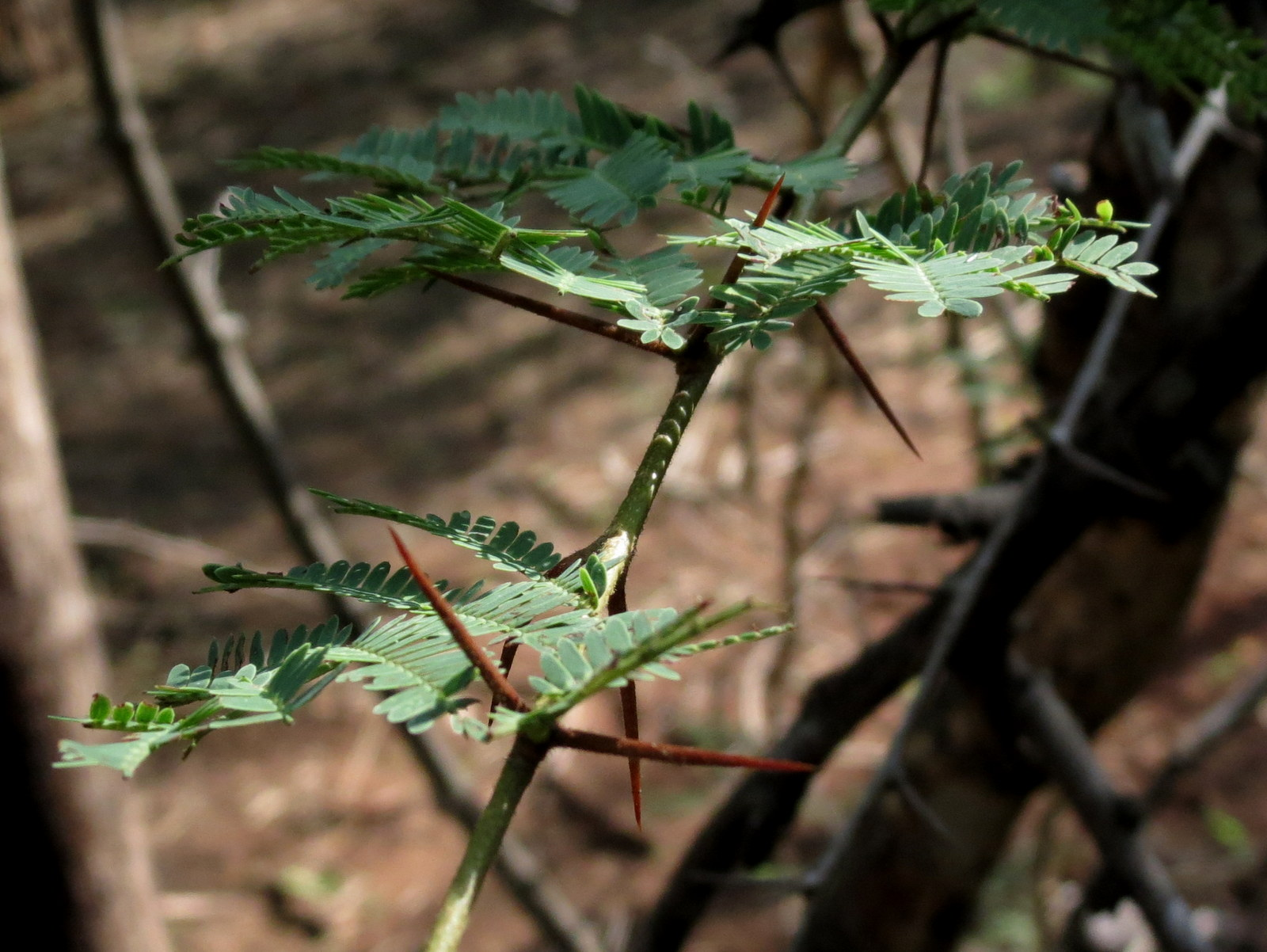
V. leucophloea branch showing large spines in Bangalore

== Bibliography ==
- R N Kaul (1963): Need for afforestation in the arid zones of India, LA-YAARAN, Vol 13
- R C Ghosh (1977): Hand book on afforestation techniques, Dehradun.
- R K Gupta & Ishwar Prakasah (1975): Environmental analysis of the Thar Desert, Dehradun.
