= Sumatran montane rain forests =

Ecoregion in Indonesia

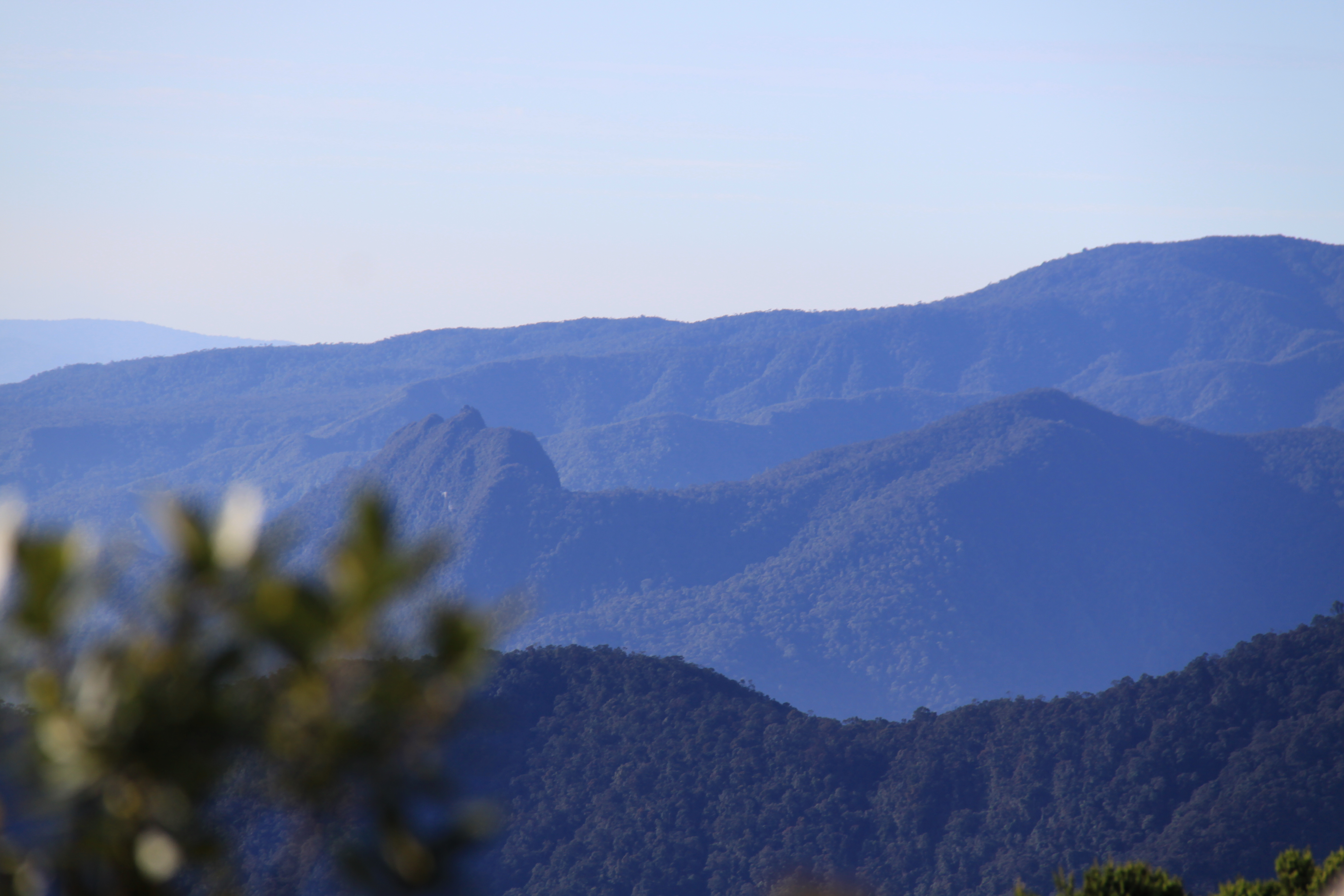
- Mount Kemiri in Mount Leuser National Park

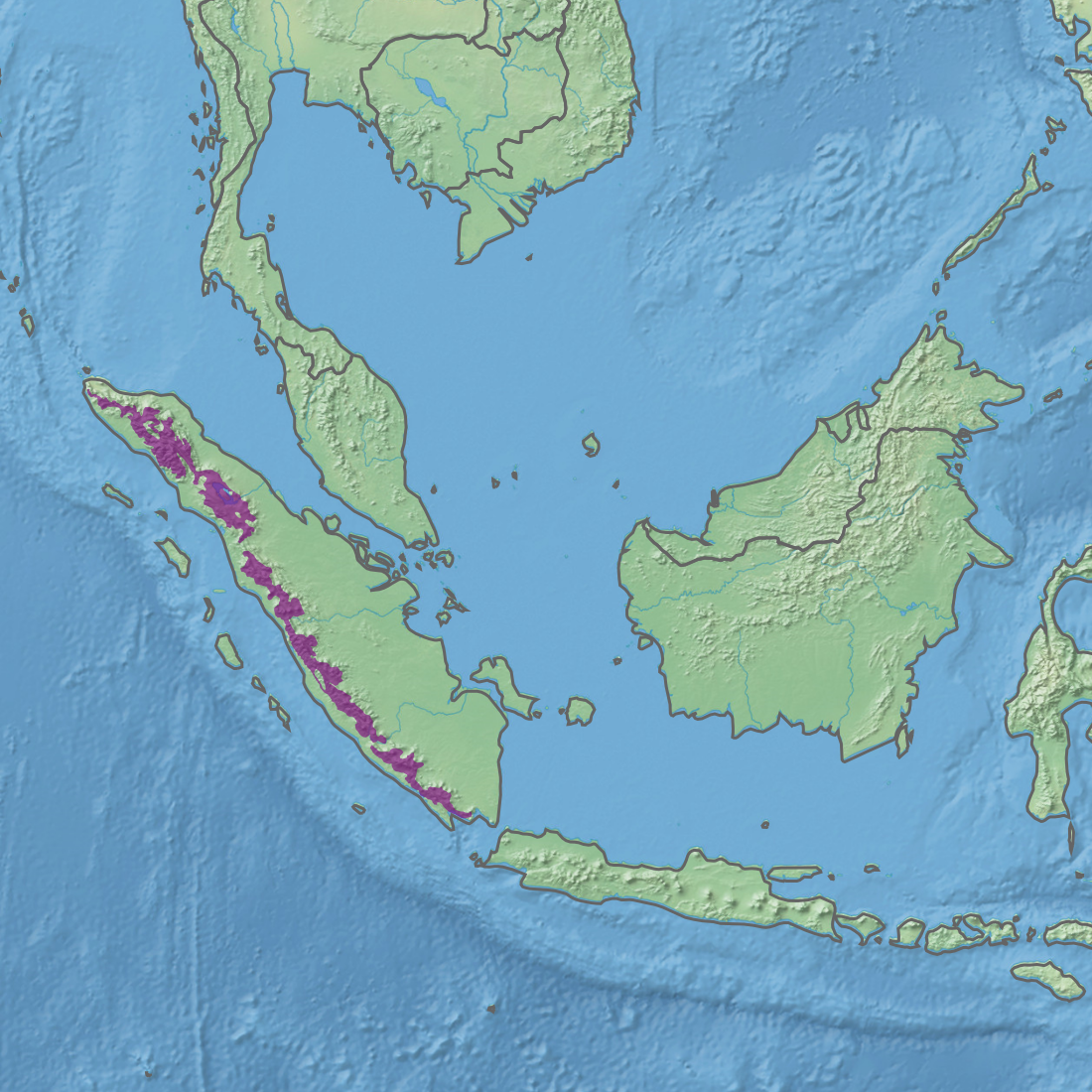
- Ecoregion territory (in purple)

Ecology
- Realm: Indomalayan
- Biome: Tropical and subtropical moist broadleaf forests
- Borders: Sumatran lowland rain forests; Sumatran tropical pine forests

Geography
- Area: 72,779 km^{2} (28,100 mi^{2})
- Country: Indonesia
- Coordinates: 2.75°N 98.75°E

Conservation
- Conservation status: Relatively stable/intact
- Protected: 31.89%

The Sumatran montane rain forests ecoregion (WWF ID: IM0159) covers the mountainous elevations (greater than 1,000 meters) of the Barisan Mountains Range that runs the length of the southwestern side of the island of Sumatra in Indonesia. The ecoregion is almost completely surrounded by the lower elevation Sumatran lowland rain forests. The area is one of very high biodiversity - because of the relative isolation, and variety of forest types, there are 7 endemic species of mammals and eight endemic species of birds.

== Location and description ==
The Barisan Mountains stretch for 1,600 km along the southwest side of Sumatra, the product of the subducting Australia plate and the overriding Sunda plate. The range averages less than 70 km wide, and rises from 44 meters to a maximum elevation of 3,595 metres (11,795 ft), with a mean elevation of 1,160 metres (3,810 ft). There are 35 active volcanoes in the region, with the western side steeper, and the eastern slide inclining to lowlands and plains.

== Climate ==
The climate of the ecoregion is Tropical rainforest climate (Köppen climate classification (Af)). This climate is characterized as hot, humid, and having at least 60 mm of precipitation every month. Annual precipitation in the mountains averages 2,500 mm. The eastern side of the Barisan Mountains are in a rain shadow, and receive less precipitation than the west side.

== Flora and fauna ==
75% of the ecoregion is covered with closed, broadleaf evergreen forest, another 15% in other types of closed forest, and 7% open forest. There are three main forest types in the ecoregion, based on elevation: the 'lower montane forest', 'upper montane forest', and 'sub-alpine forest'.

The lower montane forest has tree species similar to the lowland rain forests, but they are shorter (up to 35 meters), buttresses are rare, llianas (woody vines) are rare, epiphytes become more common, and the lowland domination of trees of the family Dipterocarpaceae gives way to more trees of the oak family Fagaceae, such as stone oaks (Lithocarpus), and of the laurel family Lauraceae, such as Cinnamomum burmanni.

The upper montane forest forms at higher elevations, depending on temperature and cloud level. The trees in this zone are shorter (up to 20 meters, and epiphytes, such as moss and lichens, are more common. Characteristic upper montane plants include conifers and trees in the myrtle family Myrtaceae. The sub-alpine forest zone begins at higher elevations, and features grasses, heath, and bogs. Ericaceous plants, including species of Rhododendron and Vaccinium, are common in the sub-alpine and upper montane forests. Trees in the sub-alpine zone are scattered and stunted, typically under 10 meters in height.

== Fauna ==
Mammals of conservation interest include the vulnerable Thomas's langur (Presbytis thomasi), the vulnerable Sumatran striped rabbit (Nesolagus netscheri), and the Sumatran tiger (Panthera tigris).

Endemic birds include the red-billed partridge (Arborophila rubrirostris), Salvadori's pheasant (Lophura inornata), Hoogerwerf's pheasant (Lophura inornata hoogerwerfi), Sumatran ground cuckoo (Carpococcyx viridis), Schneider's pitta (Pitta schneideri), and Sumatran cochoa (Cochoa beccarii).

== Protected areas ==
Over 31% of the ecoregion is officially protected. The protected areas include:

- Mount Leuser National Park
- Bukit Barisan Selatan National Park
- Kerinci Seblat National Park
- Batang Gadis National Park
- Isau-Isau Wildlife Reserve
