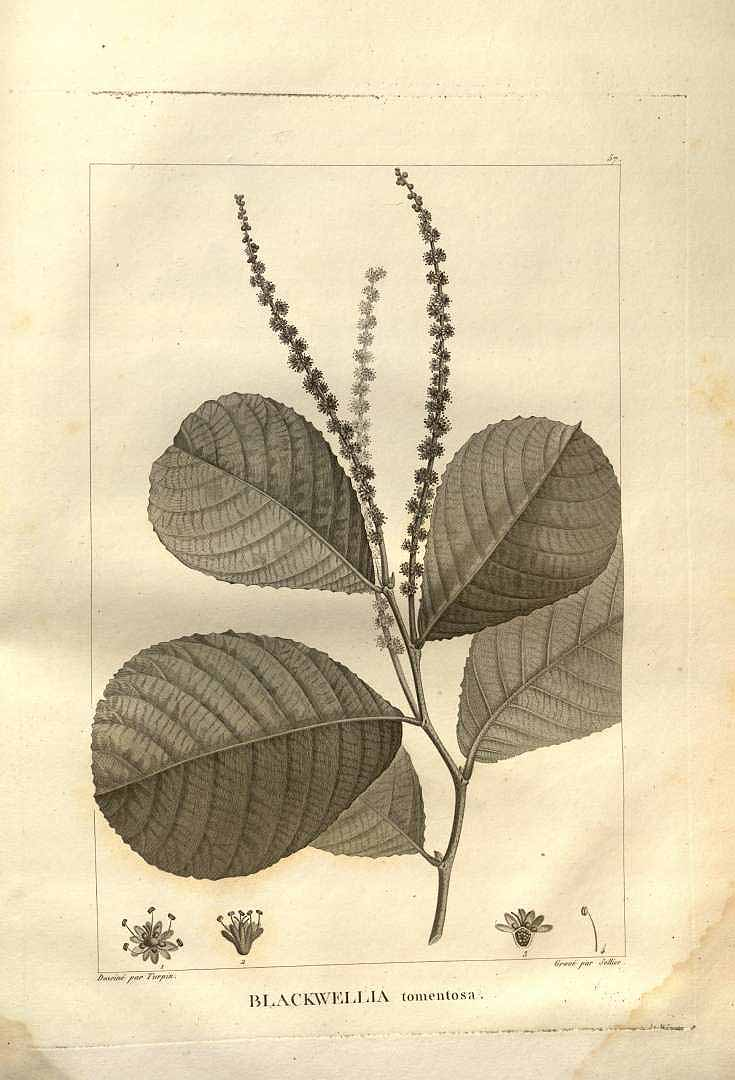

Scientific classification
- Kingdom: Plantae
- Clade: Tracheophytes
- Clade: Angiosperms
- Clade: Eudicots
- Clade: Rosids
- Order: Malpighiales
- Family: Salicaceae
- Genus: Homalium
- Species: H. tomentosum

Binomial name
- Homalium tomentosum (Vent.) Benth. (1859)

Synonyms
- Blakwellia propinqua Wall. (1831), not validly publ.; Blakwellia spiralis Wall. (1820); Blakwellia tomentosa Vent. (1808); Homalium propinquum C.B.Clarke (1879), nom. superfl.

= Homalium tomentosum =

Species of tree

Homalium tomentosum is a species of flowering plant in the family Salicaceae. It is a tree native to South and Southeast Asia, where it ranges from eastern India and Bangladesh through Indochina, Peninsular Malaysia, Sumatra, and Java to the Lesser Sunda Islands.
