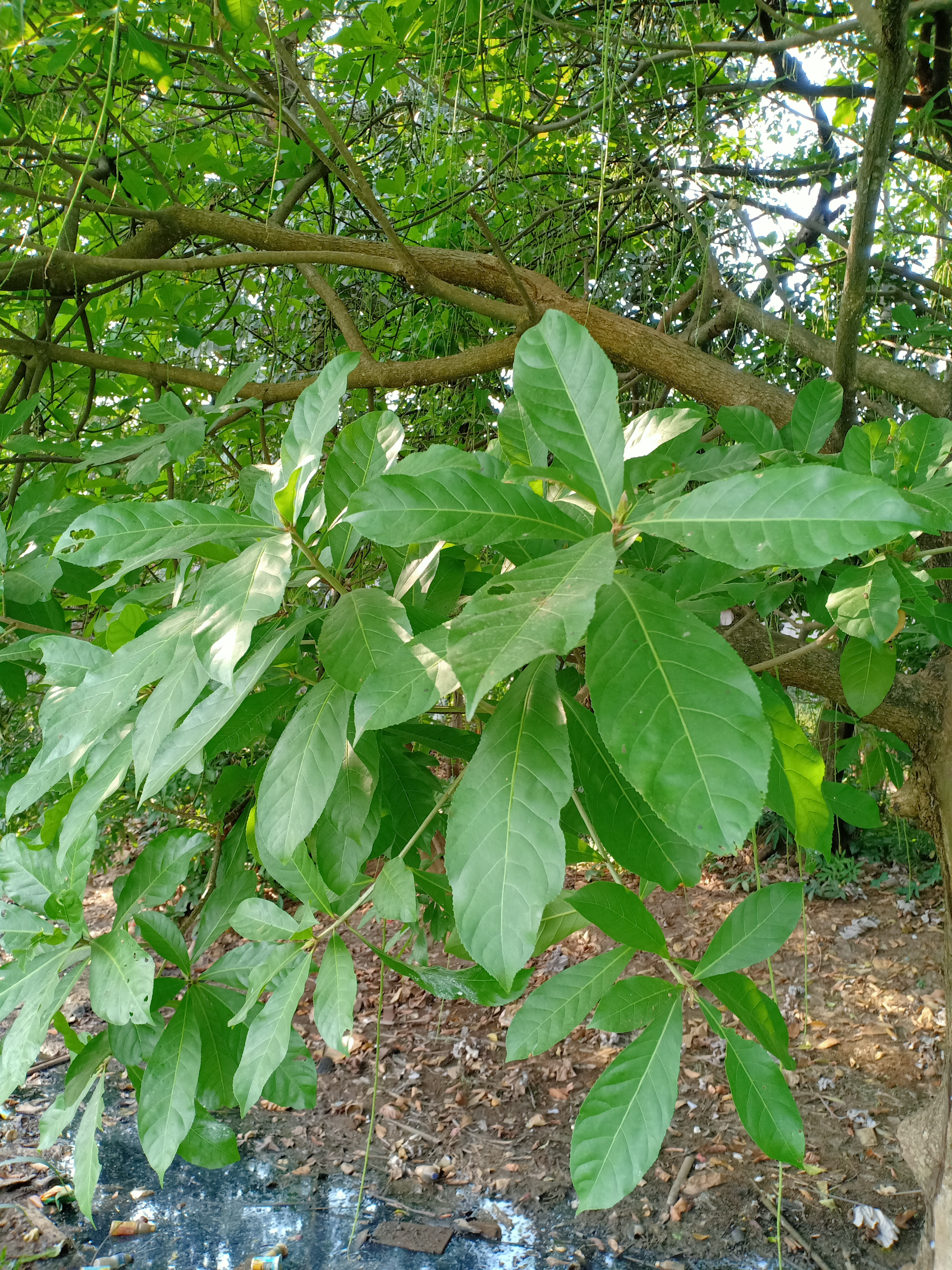
- In Indonesia

Scientific classification
- Kingdom: Plantae
- Clade: Tracheophytes
- Clade: Angiosperms
- Clade: Eudicots
- Clade: Asterids
- Order: Ericales
- Family: Lecythidaceae
- Genus: Planchonia
- Species: P. valida

Binomial name
- Planchonia valida (Blume) Blume

Synonyms
- List: Gustavia valida (Blume) DC.; Pirigara valida Blume; Planchonia alata Blume; Planchonia elliptica Miers; Planchonia forbesii R.Knuth; Planchonia littoralis Blume; Planchonia nitida Miers; Planchonia sumatrana Blume; Planchonia undulata Teijsm. & Binn.

= Planchonia valida =

Species of flowering plant

Planchonia valida grows as a tree up to 50 metres (160 ft) tall, with a trunk diameter of up to 2 metres (6 ft 7 in). The bark is grey brown. The flowers are green. The tree grows in a variety of habitats from sea level to 1,000 metres (3,300 ft) elevation. P. valida is found in the Andaman and Nicobar Islands, Malaysia and Indonesia.
