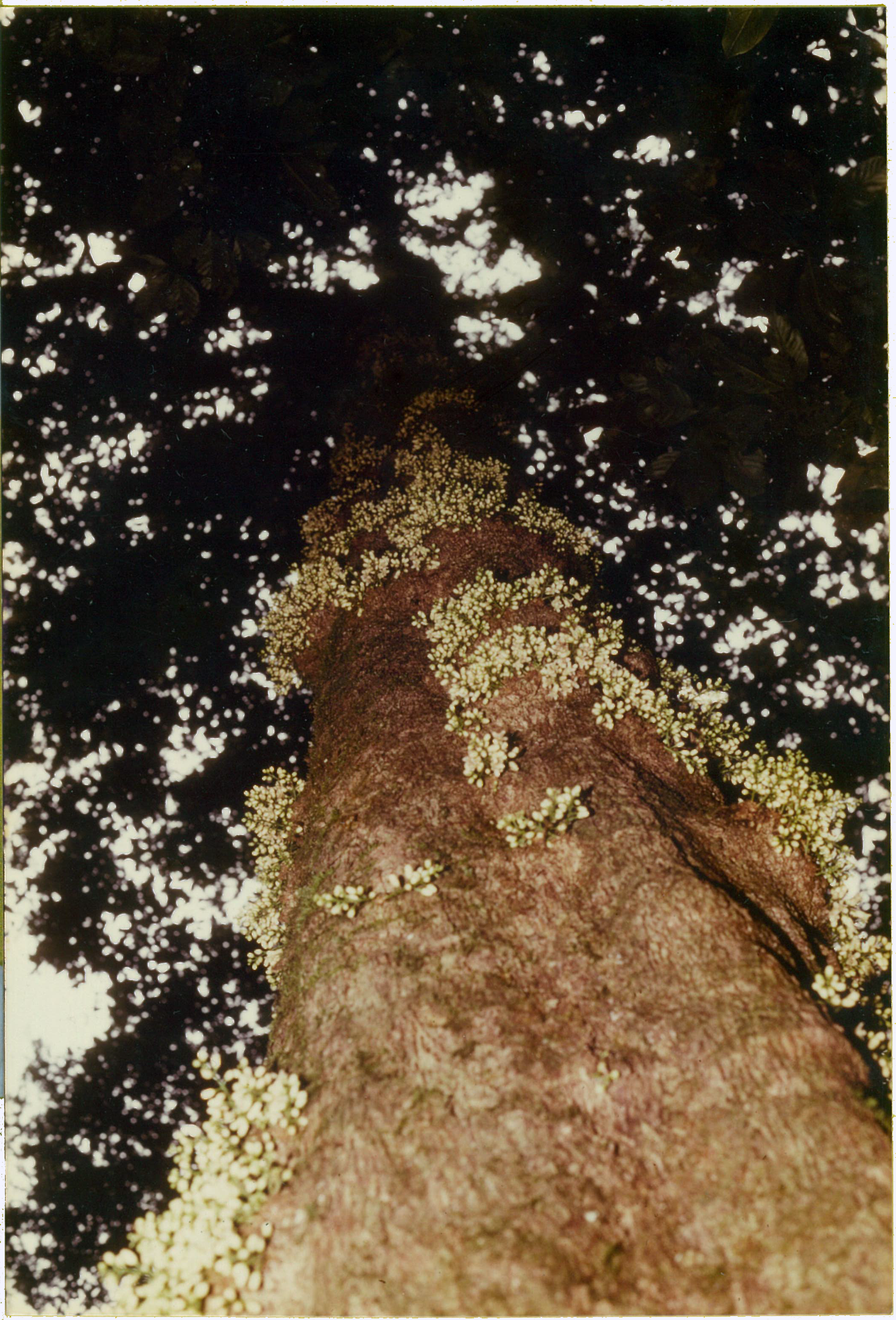
- Flowering at Mount Hypipamee National Park, November 2022

Conservation status
- Least Concern (NCA)

Scientific classification
- Kingdom: Plantae
- Clade: Tracheophytes
- Clade: Angiosperms
- Clade: Eudicots
- Clade: Rosids
- Order: Sapindales
- Family: Meliaceae
- Genus: Epicharis
- Species: E. parasitica

Binomial name
- Epicharis parasitica (Osbeck) Mabb.
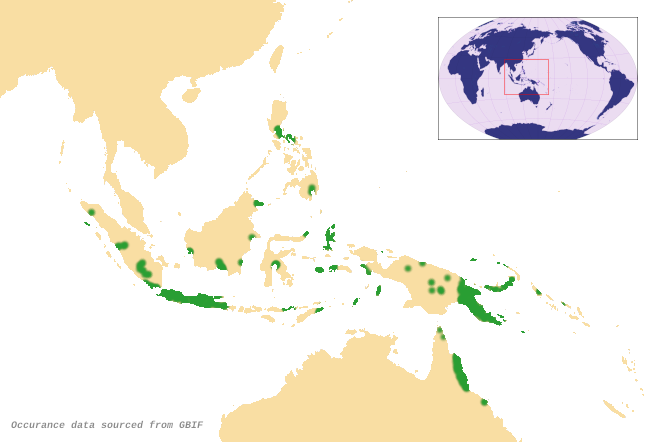

Synonyms
- 46 synonyms: Homotypic: Dysoxylum parasiticum (Osbeck) Kosterm.; Lansium parasiticum (Osbeck) K.C.Sahni & Bennet; Melia parasitica Osbeck; Heterotypic: Alliaria caulostachya Kuntze; Alliaria ramiflora Kuntze; Alliaria speciosa Kuntze; Azedarach ramiflorum Noronha; Dysoxylum brachypodum Baker f.; Dysoxylum callianthum Merr. & L.M.Perry; Dysoxylum caulostachyum Miq.; Dysoxylum densevestitum C.T.White; Dysoxylum fissum C.T.White & W.D.Francis ex Lane-Poole; Dysoxylum leytense Merr.; Dysoxylum loheri Merr.; Dysoxylum longicalicinum C.DC.; Dysoxylum longiflorum Merr.; Dysoxylum longipetalum C.DC.; Dysoxylum megalanthum Hemsl.; Dysoxylum novoguineeuse Warb.; Dysoxylum ramiflorum Miq.; Dysoxylum richardianum Merr. & L.M.Perry; Dysoxylum robinsonii Merr.; Dysoxylum roemeri C.DC.; Dysoxylum rumphii Merr.; Dysoxylum schiffneri F.Muell.; Dysoxylum sericeum (Blume) Adelb.; Dysoxylum speciosum (A.Juss.) Miq.; Epicharis brachypoda (Baker f.) Harms; Epicharis calliantha (Merr. & L.M.Perry) Harms; Epicharis cauliflora Blume; Epicharis caulostachya (Miq.) Harms; Epicharis densevestita (C.T.White) Harms; Epicharis hyacinthodora Harms; Epicharis leytensis (Merr.) Harms; Epicharis loheri (Merr.) Harms; Epicharis longicalycina (C.DC.) Harms; Epicharis longiflora (Merr.) Harms; Epicharis longipetala (C.DC.) Harms; Epicharis megalantha (Hemsl.) Harms; Epicharis ramiflora (Miq.) Pierre; Epicharis robinsonii (Merr.) Harms; Epicharis rumphii (Merr.) Harms; Epicharis schiffneri (F.Muell.) Harms; Epicharis sericea Blume; Guarea cauliflora Reinw. ex Blume; Guarea sericea Spreng.

= Epicharis parasitica =

Yellow mahogany

Species of plant in the mahogany family

Epicharis parasitica, commonly known as yellow mahogany, is a species of tree in the family Meliaceae; it grows primarily in tropical rainforests and is native to Taiwan, parts of Malesia, Papuasia, and northeast Queensland.

== Description ==
Epicharis parasitica grows up to 36 m (118 ft) tall with a trunk diameter of up to 60 cm (24 in). Buttresses may be present, growing up to 1.5 m (4 ft 11 in) tall and wide. The bark is yellowish to grey-brown, and smooth to flaky with scattered lenticels.

The compound leaves are arranged spirally on the twigs and measure up to 1.5 m (4 ft 11 in) long with up to 19 leaflets. Leaflets are oblong to ovate in shape and up to 19 cm (7.5 in) long by 6 cm (2.4 in) wide, with about 14 lateral veins each side of the midrib.

The inflorescence is a raceme up to 30 cm (12 in) long, growing from protrusions on the trunk of the tree in a process called cauliflory, or from woody branches (ramiflory). The sweetly scented flowers are white or cream with four petals. The white staminal tube measures about 15 mm (0.59 in) long and 4 mm (0.16 in) wide.

The fruit is a globose red-brown capsule about 4 to 5 cm (1.6 to 2.0 in) diameter. It has up to four segments with one seed contained in each. The seeds are about 2 cm (0.79 in) long, brownish-black and with an orange-red sarcotesta.

== Taxonomy ==
This species was first described by the Swedish naturalist Pehr Osbeck as Melia parasitica, and published in 1757 in his book Dagbok ofwer en Ostindisk Resa aren 1750, 1751, 1752. Since then, it had been described more than 40 times by various authors who gave it various names (see synonyms), before it was transferred to the genus Dysoxylum by Indonesian botanist André Joseph Guillaume Henri Kostermans in 1966. Australian populations were known as Dysoxylum schiffneri.

=== Etymology ===
The species epithet is from the Latin word parasiticus meaning 'parasitic', referring to Osbeck's early mistaken belief that the flowers were parasitic.

== Distribution and habitat ==
The yellow mahogany's natural range includes Taiwan, the Philippines, Borneo, Sumatra, Java, Sulawesi, Maluku, East Timor, New Guinea, the Bismarck Archipelago, the Solomon Islands and Queensland. It grows in well developed rainforest, including that on limestone, at altitudes from sea-level to around 2,100 m (6,900 ft).

== Ecology ==
The flowers are visited by butterflies, an important pollinator of the family. Possums and bats also contribute to the pollination as they climb the trunk of the tree looking for food.

== Uses ==
Epicharis parasitica has potential as a feature tree in parks or gardens in areas with subtropical or tropical climates.

== Cultivation ==
It prefers acid soils with good drainage and dappled sun or part-shade. The species can be propagated by fresh seed.

== Gallery ==
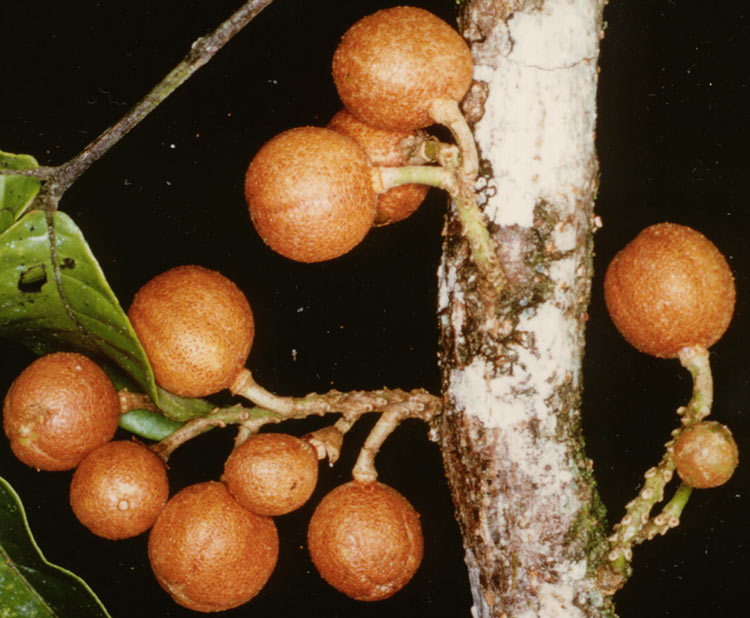
Fruit

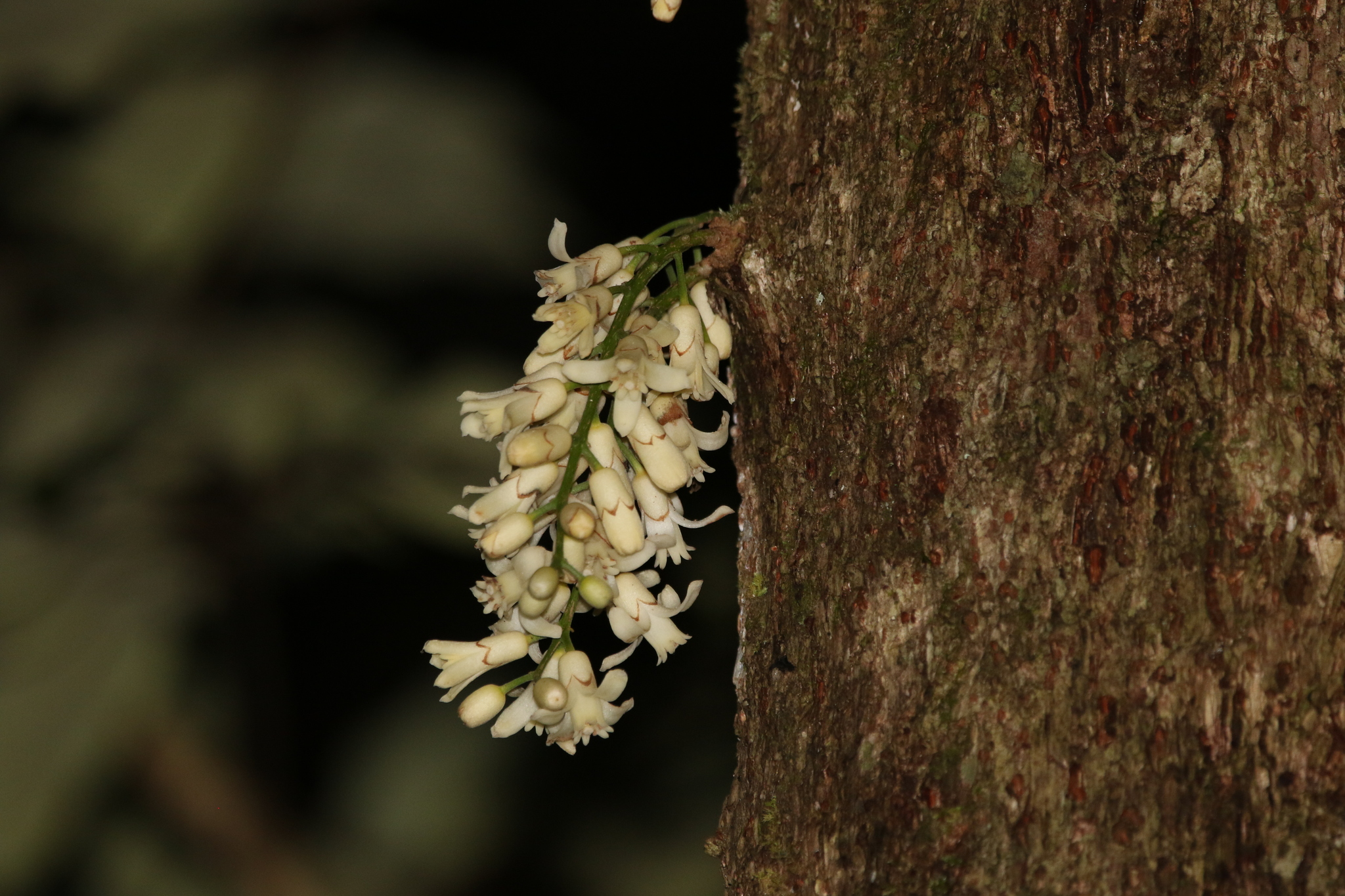
Inflorescence on the trunk

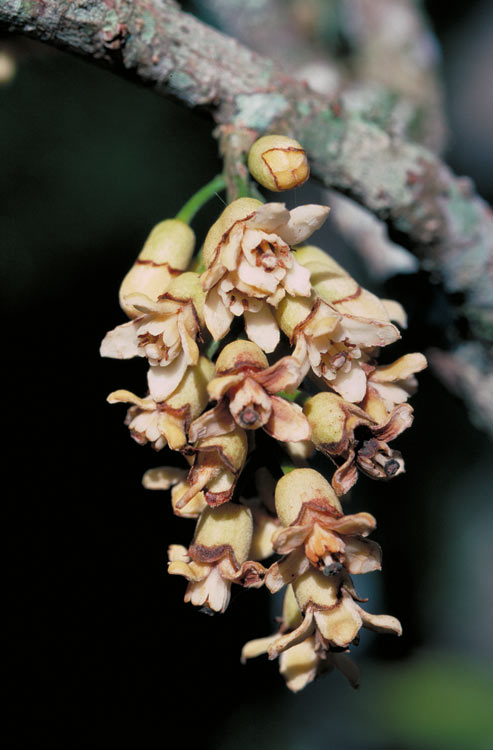
On a branch

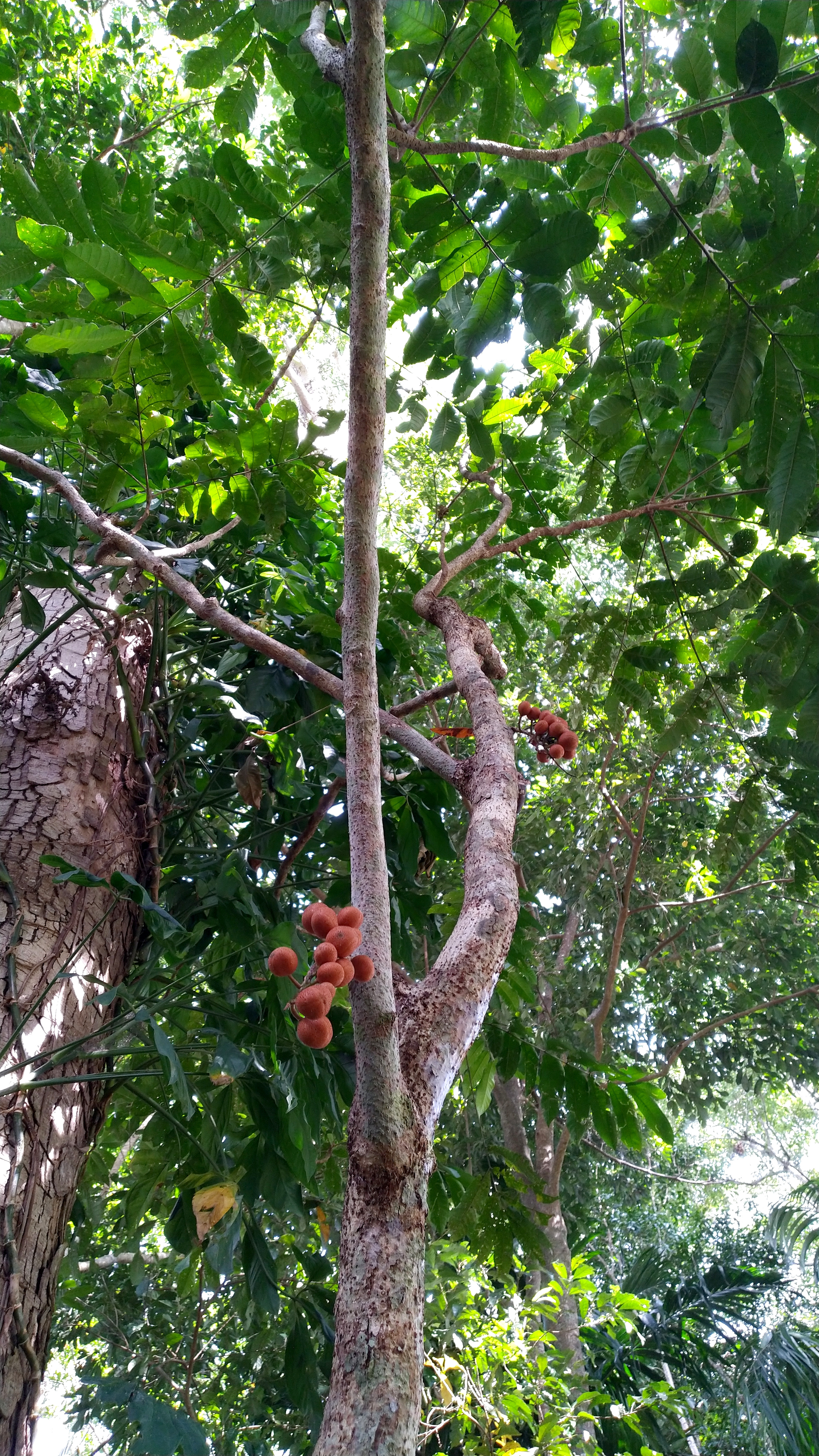
Young tree

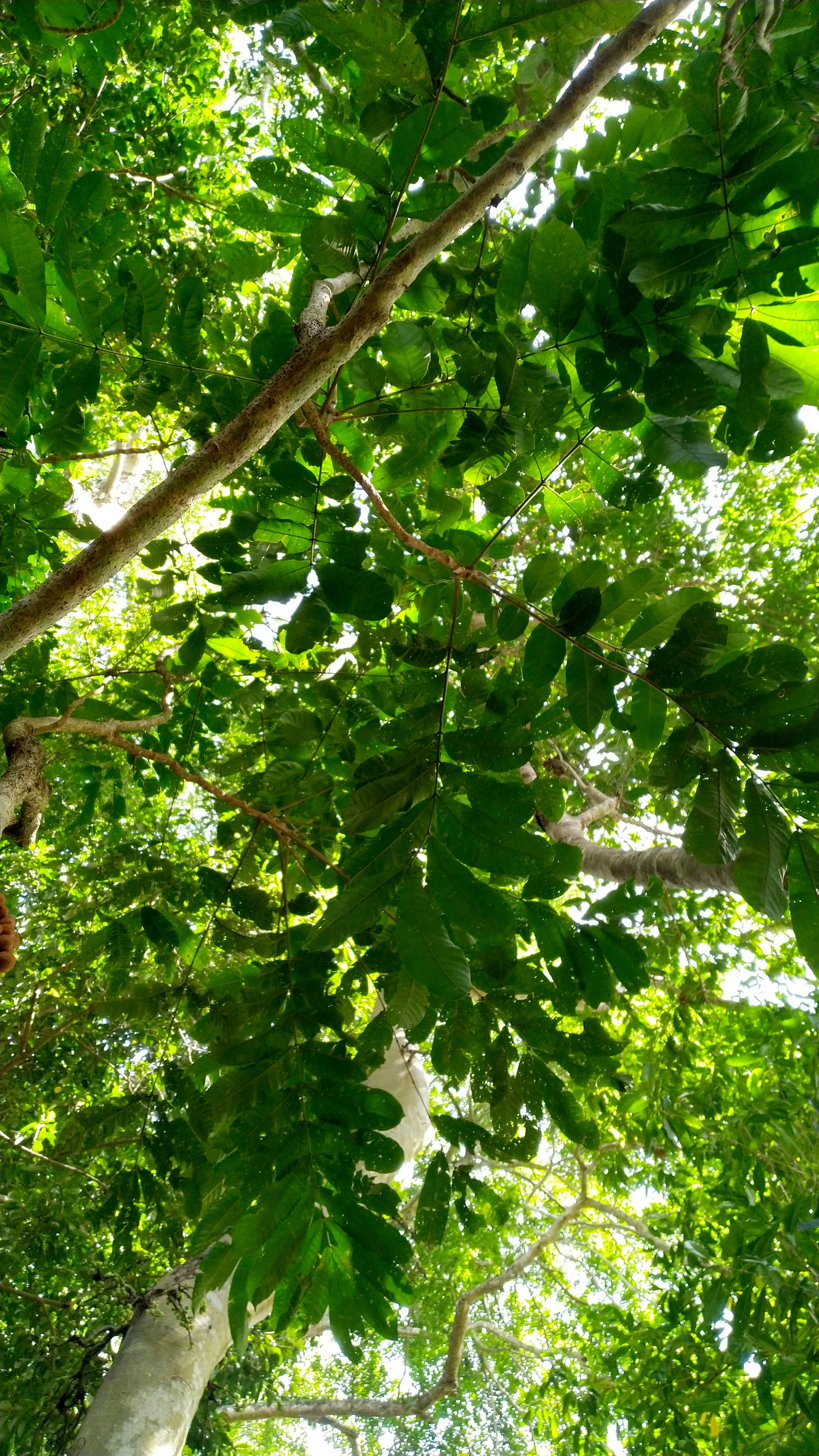
Foliage

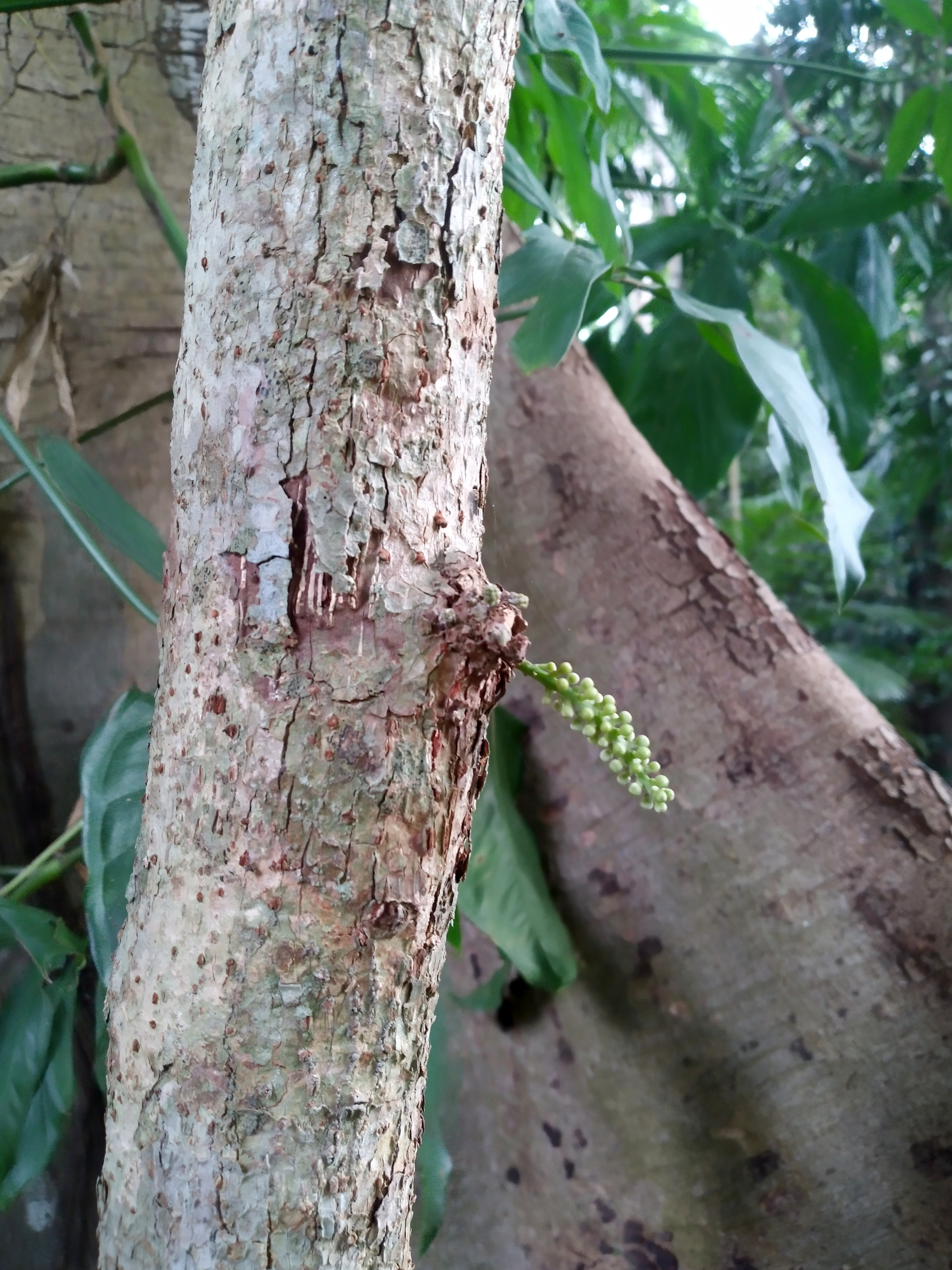
Flower buds

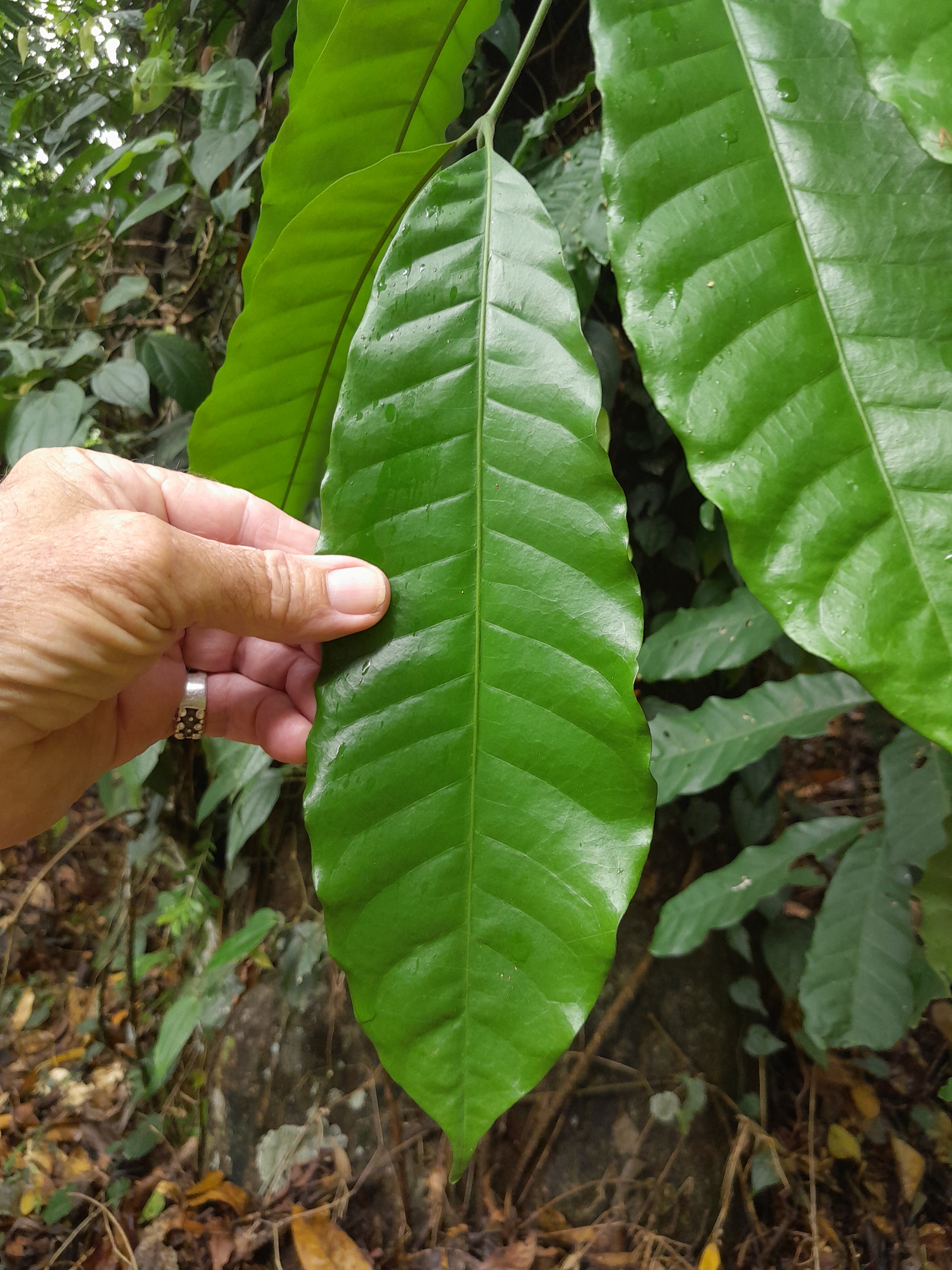
Leaves

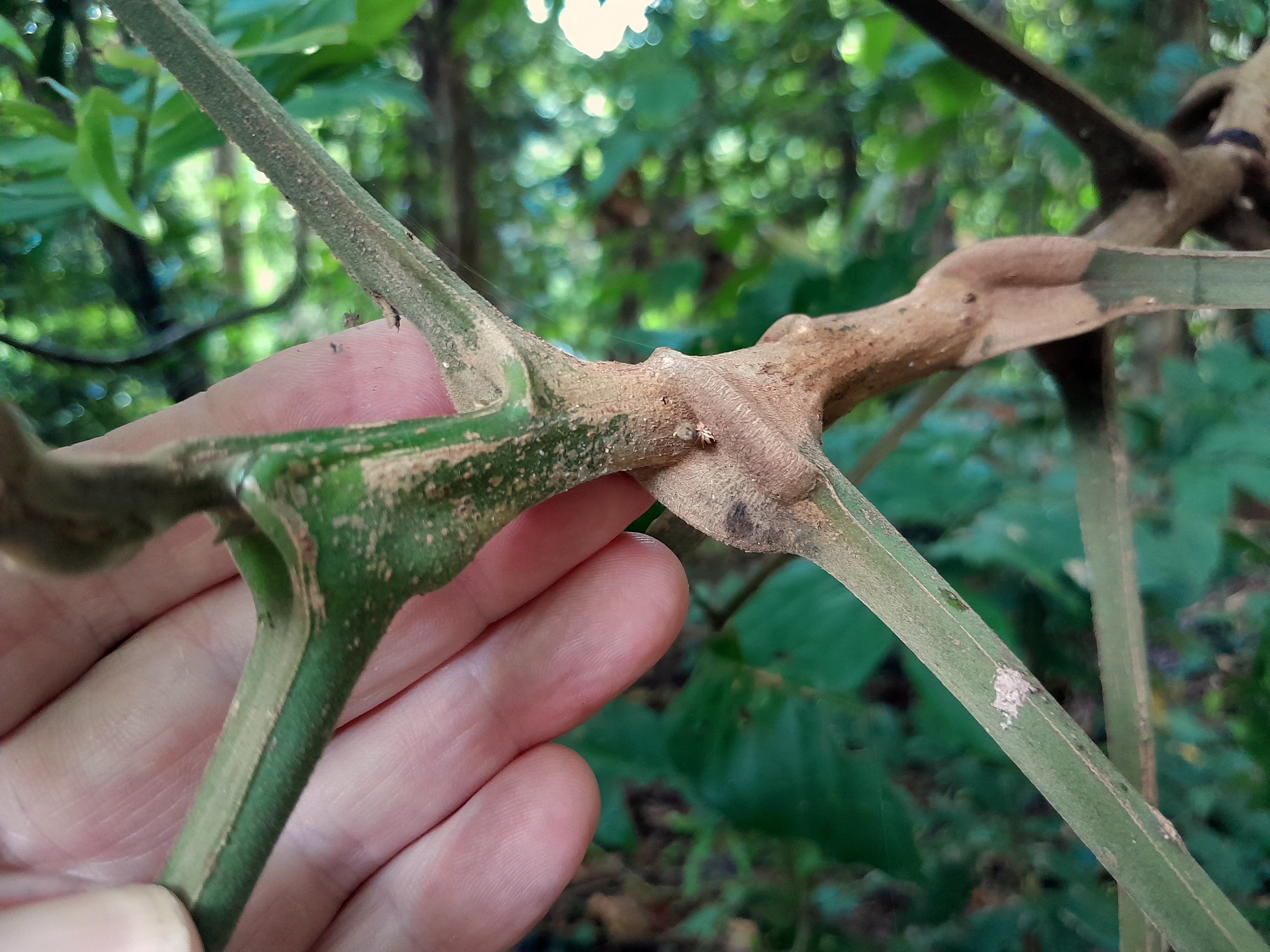
Stout petioles attached to the twig
