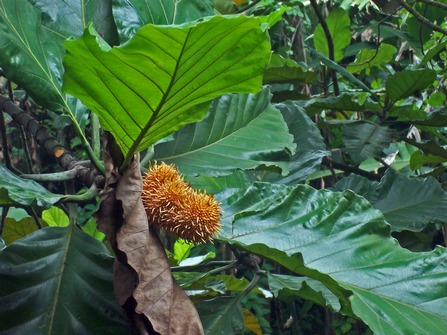
- Leaves and fruit, Jogyakarta, Indonesia

Conservation status
- Least Concern (IUCN 3.1)

Scientific classification
- Kingdom: Plantae
- Clade: Embryophytes
- Clade: Tracheophytes
- Clade: Angiosperms
- Clade: Eudicots
- Clade: Rosids
- Order: Rosales
- Family: Moraceae
- Genus: Artocarpus
- Species: A. elasticus

Binomial name
- Artocarpus elasticus Reinw. ex Blume

Synonyms
- Artocarpus blumei Trécul; Artocarpus kunstleri King; Artocarpus pubescens Blume, nom. illeg. homonym. post.; Saccus blumei (Trécul) Kuntze; Saccus elasticus (Reinw. ex Blume) Kuntze; Saccus kunstleri (King) Kuntze

= Artocarpus elasticus =

Species of flowering plant

Artocarpus elasticus of the Mulberry Family (Moraceae) and commonly called terap nasi or terap, is a rainforest tree of maritime and mainland Southeast Asia, growing up to 45 metres (150 ft) (occasionally as much as 214 feet (65 meters)) in height with a diameter at breast height of about 1 metre (3 ft). The juvenile trees are noteworthy for producing a rosette of enormous deeply lobed leaves similar in shape to those of the white oak (Quercus alba), but up to 2 metres (6 ft) long by about 1.2 metres (4 ft) in width. The stipules are up to eight inches (twenty centimeters) long, among the largest known. These leaves emerge from leaf buds as long as 18 centimetres (7 in). The trees are dioecious (male and female flowers on separate trees). It produces a fruit like a small breadfruit. The male capitulae produce clouds of pollen, and pollenisation is apparently by wind.
