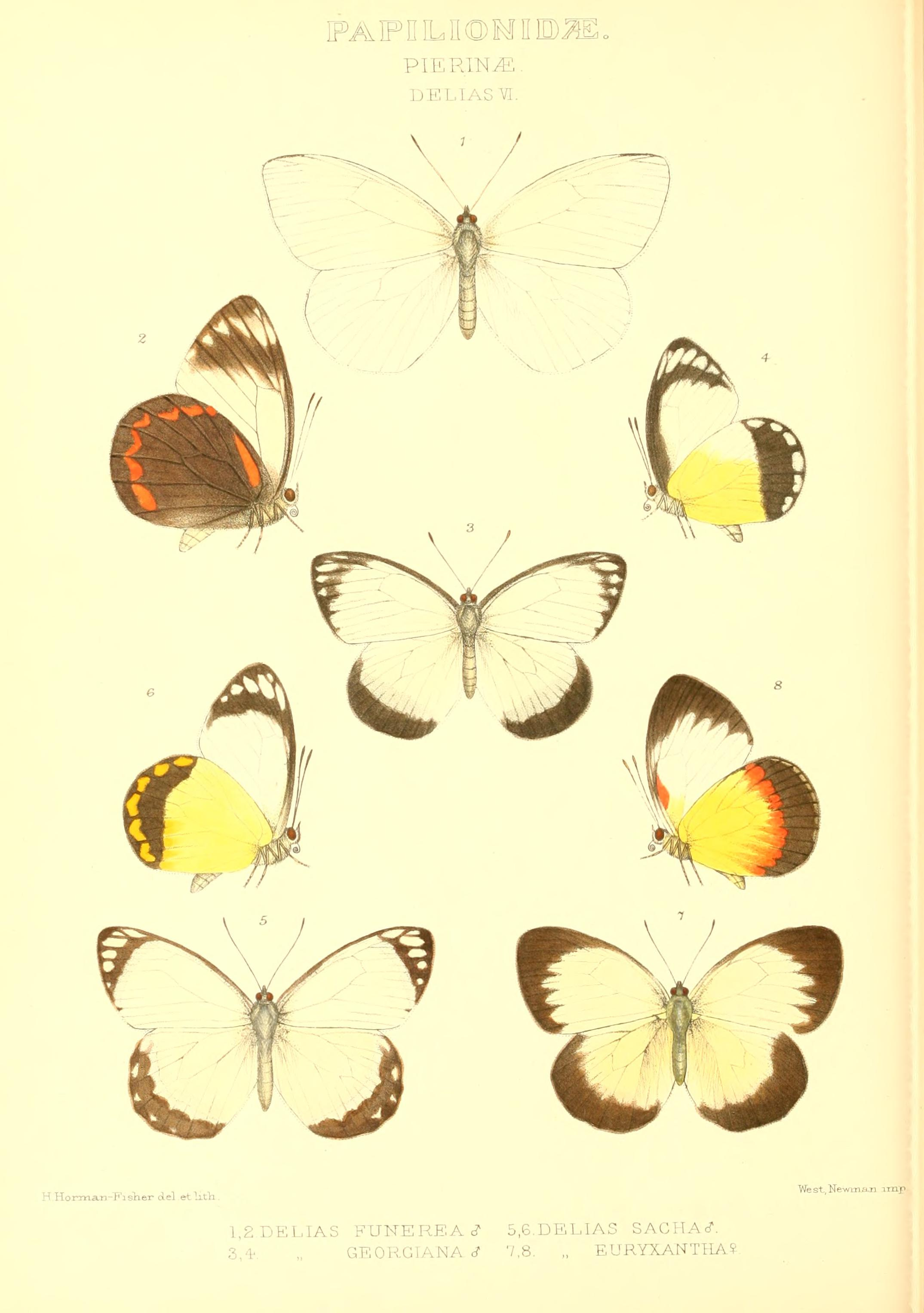
- Delias sacha in Grose-Smith and Kirby Rhopalocera Exotica

Scientific classification
- Kingdom: Animalia
- Phylum: Arthropoda
- Clade: Pancrustacea
- Class: Insecta
- Order: Lepidoptera
- Family: Pieridae
- Genus: Delias
- Species: D. sacha

Binomial name
- Delias sacha Grose-Smith, 1895

Synonyms
- Delias sacha gilolensis Rothschild, 1925

= Delias sacha =

Species of butterfly

Delias sacha is a butterfly in the family Pieridae. It was described by Henley Grose-Smith in 1895. It is found on the Wallace line, where it has been recorded from Obi.

== Description ==
Original Delias sacha sp. nov.

Male. — Upperside: both wings white. Anterior wings with a black apical patch, in which is situate a row of six white spots smaller than in D. poecilea Voll., the inner side of the black patch towards the costa being dusted with white scales and becoming obsolete. Posterior wings with an outer-marginal broad black band, irrorated with white scales on its inner edge; between the veins on the margin is a row of rather indistinct subtriangular white spots dusted with black scales, the lowest being between the two lowest median nervules, and almost obsolete.

Underside: anterior wings resemble D. poecilea but the white .spots in the apical black area are more clearly defined and are outwardly conical. Posterior wings lemon yellow, bordered by a broad lilac band, narrower and straighter than in D. poecilla, in which is situate, nearer the margin than in that species, a row of subtriangular orange spots with their apices pointing outwardly (not inwardly, as in D.poecilea; above the anal angle the inner edge of the black area is narrowly tinged with orange. Expanse of wings : 2 and 1/2 inches. Hab. Obi Island.

This species is nearest to D. poecilea on the upperside; on the underside it more closely resembles D. Candida Voll., but the outer-marginal black band on the underside of the posterior wings is wider and extends to the apex. Described from two specimens. The wingspan is about 74 mm.

Adults are similar to Delias periboea and Delias fasciata, but larger.

== Taxonomy ==
sacha is a member of the isse species group.
