= Lesser Sunda Islands =

Region and archipelago in Indonesia and Timor Leste

Native name: Kepulauan Sunda Kecil (Indonesian); Ilhas Menores da Sonda (Portuguese); Illa Sunda Ki'ik Sira (Tetun); ᬓᬧᬸᬮᭀᬯᬦ᭄ᬲᬸᬦ᭄ᬤᬘᭂᬦᬶ Kapuloan Sunda Cenik (Balinese) Jejeq Gili-gili Sunda Kodéq (Sasak) Pah-pah Sunda Ana' (Uab Meto) Nuca-nuca Sunda Koé (Manggarai) Nisa Doho Sunda To'i (Bima) Gili-gili Sunda Odek (Sumbawa) Kapoloan Sunda Kenik (Kangean)
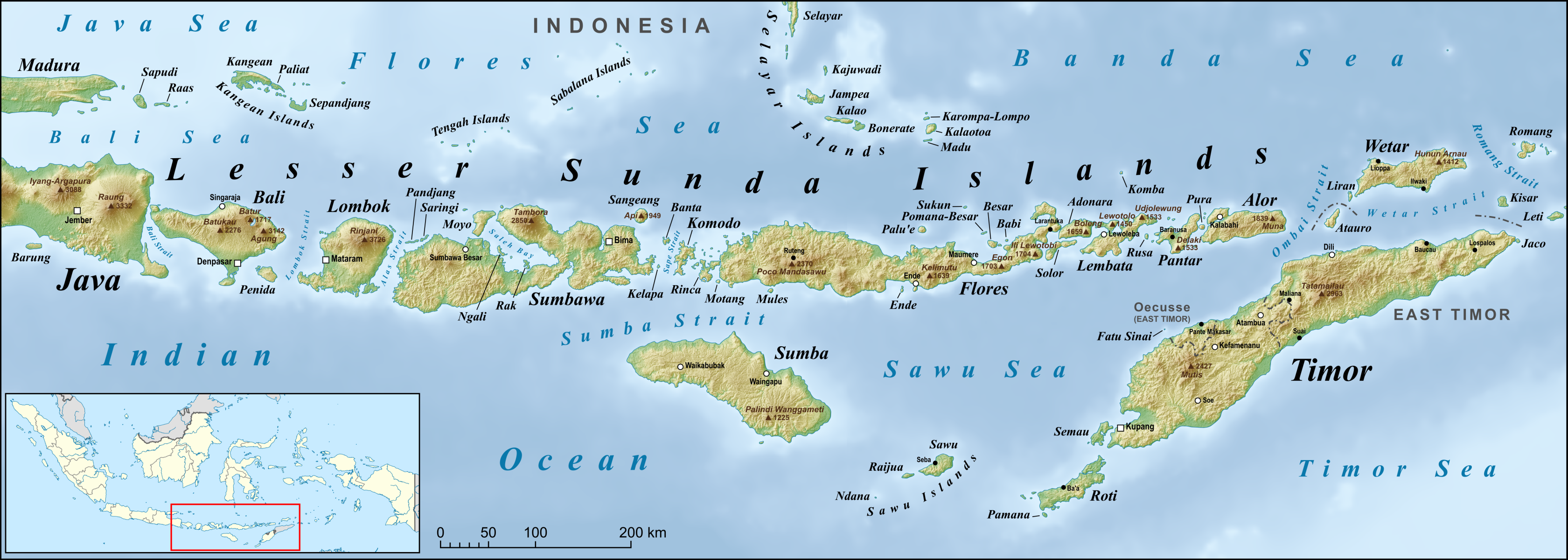

Geography
- Location: Southeast Asia
- Coordinates: 9°00′S 120°00′E
- Archipelago: Sunda Islands
- Total islands: 975
- Major islands: Bali, Lombok, Sumbawa, Sumba, Flores, Timor
- Highest elevation: 3,726 m (12224 ft)
- Highest point: Mount Rinjani

Administration
- Indonesia
- Provinces: Bali; West Nusa Tenggara; East Nusa Tenggara; Maluku (Southwest Maluku and Tanimbar Islands); East Java (Kangean Islands)
- Largest settlement: Denpasar (pop. 670,210)
- Timor Leste
- Municipalities: Oecusse; Bononaro; Cova Lima; Liquiçá; Ermera; Ainaro; Dili; Aileu; Manufahi; Manatuto; Baucau; Viqueque; Lautém
- Largest settlement: Dili (pop. 277,488)

Demographics
- Population: 17,507,462 (projection for 2024 since 2020)
- Ethnic groups: Balinese, Sasak, Tetum, Atoni, Manggaraian, Sumbese, Bimanese, Sumbawan, Li'o, Sikka, Mambai, Lamaholot, Savu, Kangean, Rotenese, Bunak, Kemak, Moluccans, Tanimbarese, Bali Aga, Alfur, Javanese, Buginese and others

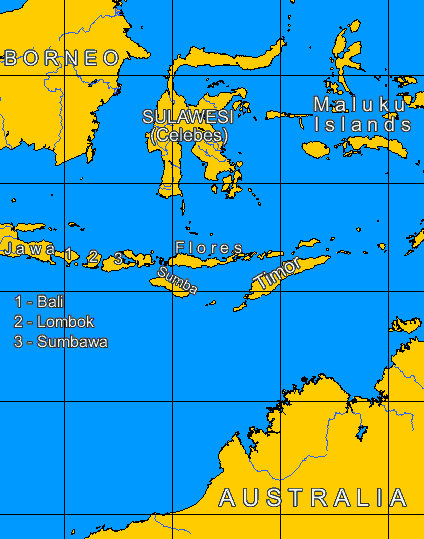
Map of Lesser Sunda Islands, east of Java

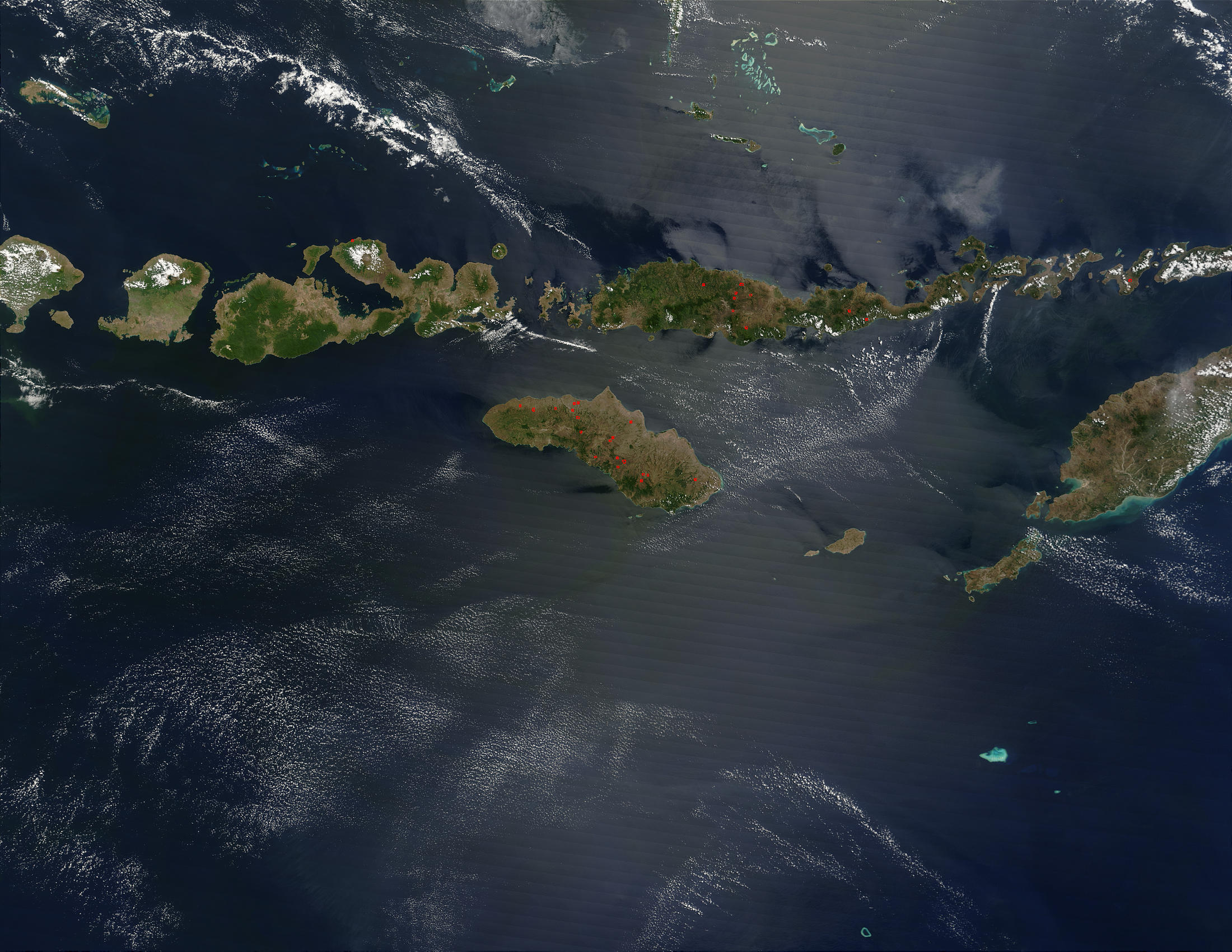
Satellite picture of the Lesser Sunda Islands

The Lesser Sunda Islands, (Note: Indonesian: Kepulauan Sunda Kecil Portuguese: Ilhas Menores da Sonda Tetun: Illa Sunda Ki'ik Sira Balinese: ᬓᬧᬸᬮᭀᬯᬦ᭄ᬲᬸᬦ᭄ᬤᬘᭂᬦᬶᬓ᭄, romanized: Kapuloan Sunda Cenik Sasak: Jejeq Gili-Gili Sunda Kodéq Uab Meto: Pah-pah Sunda Ana' Manggarai: Nuca-nuca Sunda Koé language: Nisa Doho Sunda To'i Sumbawa: Kapuluan Sunda Odek Kangean: Kapoloan Sunda Kenik) now known as Nusa Tenggara Islands (Note: (Indonesian: Kepulauan Nusa Tenggara or Southeast Islands")) in Indonesia, is an archipelago in the Indonesian archipelago and Timor Leste. Most of the Lesser Sunda Islands are located within the Wallacea region, except for the Bali province which is west of the Wallace Line and is within the Sunda Shelf. Together with the Greater Sunda Islands to the west, they make up the Sunda Islands. The islands are part of a volcanic arc, the Sunda Arc, formed by subduction along the Sunda Trench in the Java Sea. In 1930 the population was 3,460,059; today over 17 million people live on the islands. Etymologically, the name Nusa Tenggara means 'Southeast Islands' from the words nusa meaning 'island' and tenggara meaning 'southeast'.

The main Lesser Sunda Islands are, from west to east: Bali, Kangean Islands, Lombok, Sumbawa, Flores, Sumba, Savu, Rote, Timor, Atauro, Alor archipelago, Barat Daya Islands, and Tanimbar Islands. Apart from the eastern half of Timor island and Atauro island which constitute the nation of Timor Leste, all the other islands are part of Indonesia.

== Geology ==
The Lesser Sunda Islands consist of two geologically distinct archipelagos. The northern archipelago, which includes Bali, Lombok, Sumbawa, Flores and Wetar, is volcanic in origin. A number of these volcanoes, like Mount Rinjani on Lombok, are still active while others, such as Ilikedeka on Flores, are extinct. The northern archipelago began to be formed during the Pliocene, about 15 million years ago, as a result of the collision between the Australian and the Asian plates. The islands of the southern archipelago, including Sumba, Timor and Babar, are non-volcanic and appear to belong to the Australian plate. The geology and ecology of the northern archipelago share similar history, characteristics, and processes with the southern Maluku Islands, which continue the same island arc to the east.

There is a long history of geological study of these regions since Indonesian colonial times but the geological formation and progression is not fully understood, and theories of the geological evolution of the islands changed extensively during the last decades of the 20th century.

Lying at the collision of two tectonic plates, the Lesser Sunda Islands comprise some of the most geologically complex and active regions in the world. The province of Bali is the only part of Nusa Tenggara located on the Sunda Shelf and that is not within the Wallacea region and that is west of the Wallace Line.

There are a number of volcanoes located on the Lesser Sunda Islands.

== Ecology ==
The Lesser Sunda Islands differ from the large islands of Java or Sumatra in consisting of many small islands, sometimes divided by deep oceanic trenches. Movement of flora and fauna between islands is limited, leading to the evolution of a high rate of localized species, most famously the Komodo dragon. As described by Alfred Wallace in The Malay Archipelago, the Wallace Line passes between Bali and Lombok, along the deep waters of the Lombok Strait which formed a water barrier even when lower sea levels linked the now-separated islands and landmasses on either side. The islands east of the Lombok Strait are part of Wallacea, and are thus characterised by a blend of wildlife of Asian and Australasian origin in this region. Asian species predominate in the Lesser Sundas: Weber's Line, which marks the boundary between the parts of Wallacea with mainly Asian and Australasian species respectively, runs to the east of the group. These islands have the driest climate in Indonesia, and tropical dry broadleaf forests are predominant, in contrast to the tropical moist forests that prevail in most of Indonesia.

=== Ecoregions ===
The Lesser Sunda Islands are divided among six ecoregions:

- The Eastern Java-Bali rain forests and Eastern Java-Bali montane rain forests cover Bali, which is the only of the Lesser Sunda Islands in the Indomalayan realm, and not part of Wallacea. Bali was once attached to the Asian continent (see Sundaland), and home to large Asiatic mammals like Asian elephants and the extinct Bali tiger.
- The Lesser Sundas deciduous forests include the northern chain of islands, from Lombok and Sumbawa east to Flores and Alor. The higher slopes of the islands contain forests of tall Podocarpus conifers and Engelhardias with an undergrowth of lianas, epiphytes, and orchids such as Corybas, Corymborkis, and Malaxis (adder's mouth), while the coastal plains were originally savanna grasses such as the savanna with Borassus flabellifer palm trees on the coasts of Komodo, Rincah and Flores. Although most of the vegetation on these islands is dry forest there are patches of rainforest on these islands too, especially in lowland areas and riverbanks on Komodo, and there is a particular area of dry thorny forest on the southeast coast of Lombok. Thorn trees used to be more common in coastal areas of the islands but have largely been cleared. These islands are home to unique species including seventeen endemic birds (of the 273 birds found on the islands). The endemic mammals are the endangered Flores shrew (Suncus mertensi), the vulnerable Komodo rat (Komodomys rintjanus), and Lombok flying fox (Pteropus lombocensis), Sunda long-eared bat (Nyctophilus heran) while the carnivorous Komodo dragon, which at three metres long and ninety kilograms in weight is the world's largest lizard, is found on Komodo, Rincah, Gili Motang, and the coast of northwestern Flores.
- The Sumba deciduous forests ecoregion includes Sumba.
- The Timor and Wetar deciduous forests ecoregion includes Timor, Wetar (actually in Maluku Province), Rote, and Savu.
- The more humid Banda Sea Islands moist deciduous forests ecoregion includes the Barat Daya Islands (except for Wetar), the Tanimbar Islands, and the Kai Islands.

=== Threats and preservation ===
More than half of the original vegetation of the islands has been cleared for planting of rice and other crops, for settlement and by consequent forest fires. Only Sumbawa now contains a large area of intact natural forest, while Komodo, Rincah and Padar are now protected as Komodo National Park.

While many ecological problems affect both small islands and large landmasses, small islands suffer their particular problems and are highly exposed to external forces. Development pressures on small islands are increasing, although their effects are not always anticipated. Although Indonesia is richly endowed with natural resources, the resources of the small islands of Nusa Tenggara are limited and specialised; furthermore human resources in particular are limited.

General observations about small islands that can be applied to Nusa Tenggara include:

- A higher proportion of the landmass will be affected by volcanic activity, earthquakes, landslips, and cyclone damage;
- Climates are more likely to be maritime influenced;
- Catchment areas are smaller and degree of erosion higher;
- A higher proportion of the landmass is made up of coastal areas;
- A higher degree of environmental specialisation, including a higher proportion of endemic species in an overall depauperate community;
- Societies having developed in relative isolation may retain a strong sense of culture;
- Small island populations are more likely to be affected by economic migration.
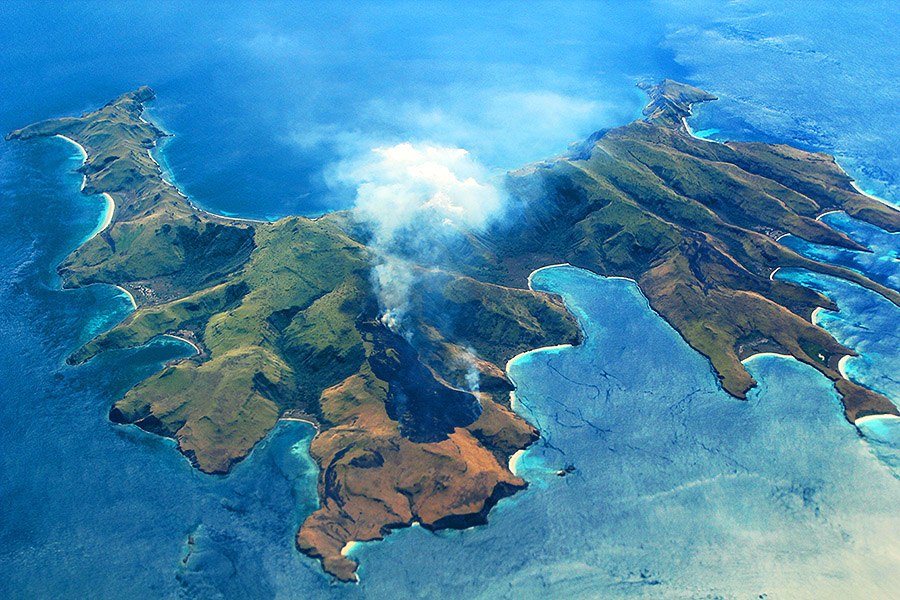
Banta Island of Lesser Sunda Islands

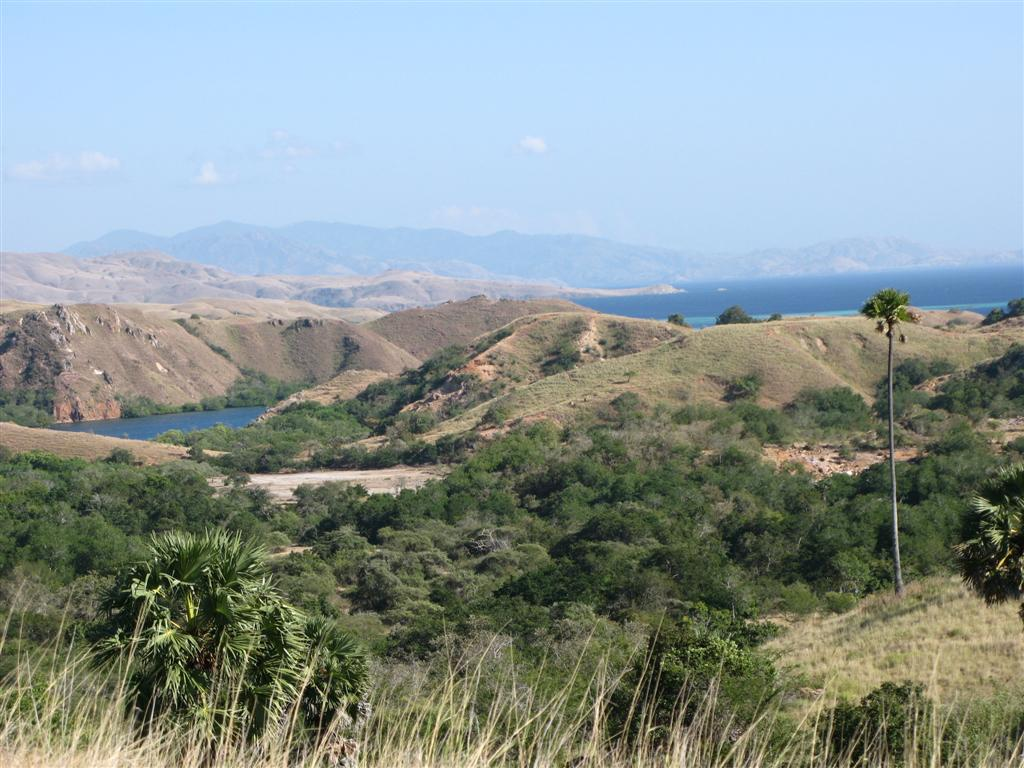
Rinca island

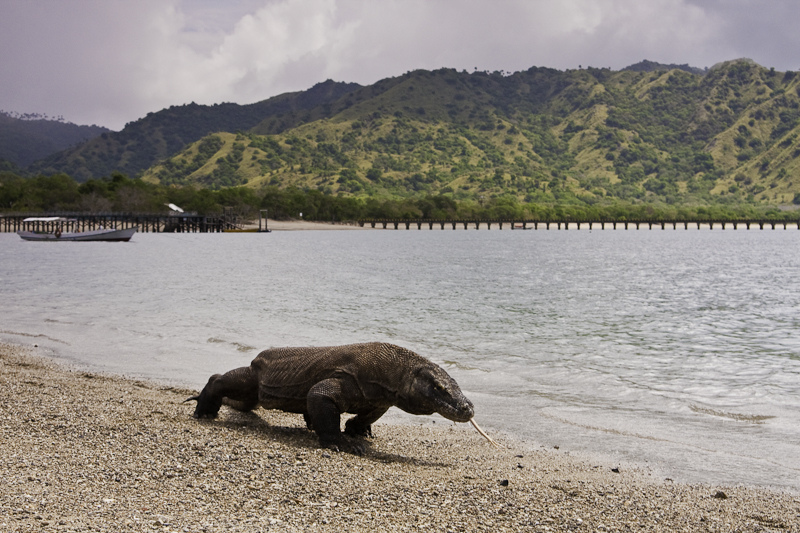
Komodo dragon at Komodo National Park

== Administration ==
The Lesser Sundas comprise many islands stretching east of Java, most of which are part of Indonesia and from 1945 were administered (apart from the easternmost islands which have been always administered as part of Maluku Province) as the Lesser Sunda Islands (Sunda Kecil) Province of Indonesia, later called Nusa Tenggara. In 1958 this was split into three new provinces, as the provinces of Bali, West Nusa Tenggara and East Nusa Tenggara.

The eastern half of Timor Island is the separate nation of East Timor (officially Timor Leste).

== Demographics ==
=== Population ===
Country	Subdivision	Population (as of)	
Indonesia	Bali	4,461,260 (2024)	16,106,824 (2024)
Indonesia	West Nusa Tenggara	5,646,000 (2024)	16,106,824 (2024)
Indonesia	East Nusa Tenggara	5,656,040 (2024)	16,106,824 (2024)
Indonesia	Maluku (Southwest Maluku and Tanimbar Islands)	217,684 (2024)	16,106,824 (2024)
Indonesia	East Java (Kangean Islands)	125,840 (2024)	16,106,824 (2024)
Timor Leste		1,400,638 (2024)	
Total population		17,507,462 (2024)	

=== Religion ===
Religion in Lesser Sunda Islands (Indonesia) (December 2023)
1. Islam (41.2%)
2. Hinduism (25.1%)
3. Roman Catholicism (19.6%)
4. Protestantism (13.6%)
5. Buddhism (0.30%)
6. Folk religion (0.20%)
7. Confucianism (0.00%)
Religion in Lesser Sunda Islands (Timor Leste) (October 2015)
1. Roman Catholicism (97.6%)
2. Protestantism (1.96%)
3. Islam (0.24%)
4. other (0.23%)

== See also ==
- Roman Catholic Archdiocese of Ende
- Banda Arc
- Greater Sunda Islands
- List of islands of Indonesia
- List of rivers of Lesser Sunda Islands
- Oceanic trench
- Plate tectonics
- Sunda Arc
- Sundaland
- Sunda Shelf
- Sunda Trench

== Bibliography ==
- Monk, Kathryn A.; Fretes, Yance De; Reksodiharjo-Lilley, Gayatri (1996). The Ecology of Nusa Tenggara and Maluku. Hong Kong: Periplus Editions Ltd. ISBN 962-593-076-0. OCLC 835572307.
