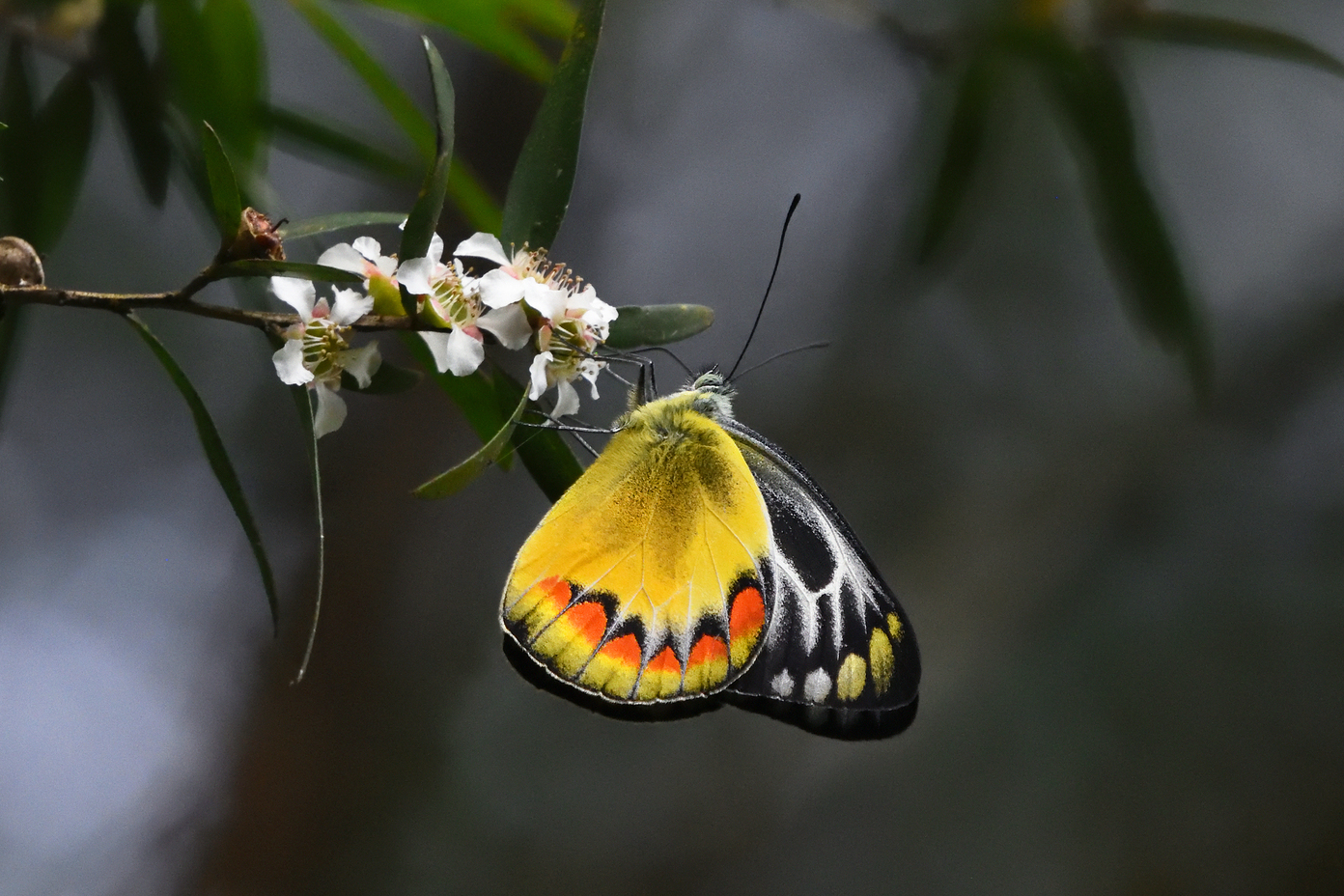

Scientific classification
- Kingdom: Animalia
- Phylum: Arthropoda
- Clade: Pancrustacea
- Class: Insecta
- Order: Lepidoptera
- Family: Pieridae
- Genus: Delias
- Species: D. sambawana

Binomial name
- Delias sambawana Rothschild, 1894

Synonyms
- Delias minerva Fruhstorfer, 1896

= Delias sambawana =

Species of butterfly

Delias sambawana is a butterfly in the family Pieridae. It was described by Walter Rothschild in 1894. It is found on the Wallace line.

== Description ==
The wingspan is about 60–65 mm. Adults are similar to Delias periboea and Delias fasciata, but larger.

Delias Sambawana, Rothschild, Novitates Zoologicae I., p. 662 (September, 1894). Exp.3 and 1/4 inches. Male. Upperside. Anterior wings greyish-white, costa, subapical band. and upper two-thirds of hind margin greyish-black. Posterior wings greyish white, with the pattern of the underside showing through; hind margin black. Head, thorax, and abdomen greenish-grey. Underside. Anterior wings black, densely powdered with white scales; at the apex four white patches powdered with greenish-yellow scales, and at the hinder angle a large snow-white blotch. Posterior wings : basal two-thirds orange, powdered with dull greenish-yellow scales; outer third black, much powdered with yellow. In the centre of this black band is a row of large submarginal half yellow, half scarlet spots.Head and thorax beneath feebly greenish-yellow; abdomen white. Hab. Sambawa (September, 1891) (Doherty). In the Collection of the Hon. W. Rothschild and H. Grose Smith. Belongs to the group of B. hierte, Hubner. We think it probable that this species is the male of D. fasciata.

== Subspecies ==
- D. s. sambawna (Sumbawa)
- D. s. minerva Fruhstorfer, 1896(Lombok)
- D. S. everetti Rothschild, 1925 (Flores)
- D. s. boejanana Kalis, 1941 (Bali)
- D. s. kenta Nakano, 1991 (Alor)

== Taxonomy ==
sambawana is a member of the hyparete species group.
