= Kangean =

Kangean or Kangeanese may refer to:

== Place ==
- Kangean Archipelago – an archipelago in Indonesia
  - Kangean Island – the main island of Kangean Archipelago, Indonesia

== People ==
- Kangeanese people – the native ethnic group of Kangean Archipelago, Indonesia

== Language ==
- Kangeanic – the native spoken language of Kangeanese ethnic group

== Others ==
- Kangean Islands Regency – proposed regencial region in East Java, Indonesia
- Kangean 1908 meteorite fall – the meteorite falls in Indonesia
