= Sunda Shelf =

Extension of the continental shelf of Southeast Asia

Map of Sahul and Sunda

Geologically, the Sunda Shelf (/ˈsʌndə/) is a south-eastern extension of the continental shelf of Mainland Southeast Asia. Major landmasses on the shelf include the Indonesian islands of Bali, Borneo, Java, Madura, and Sumatra, as well as their surrounding smaller islands. It covers an area of approximately 1.85 million km^{2}. Sea depths over the shelf rarely exceed 50 metres and extensive areas are less than 20 metres resulting in strong bottom friction and strong tidal friction. Steep undersea gradients separate the Sunda Shelf from the Philippines, Sulawesi, and the Lesser Sunda Islands (not including Bali).

== Definition ==
Biogeographically, Sundaland is a term for the region of Southeastern Asia which encompasses these areas of the Asian continental shelf that were exposed during the last ice age. Sundaland included the Malay Peninsula on the Asian mainland, as well as the large islands of Borneo, Java, and Sumatra, and their surrounding islands. The same steep undersea gradients that mark the eastern boundary of Sundaland are identified biogeographically by the Wallace Line, identified by Alfred Russel Wallace, which marks the eastern boundary of Asia's land mammal fauna, and is the boundary between the Indomalayan and Australasian realms.

The shelf has resulted from millennia of volcanic activity and erosion of the Asian continental mass, and the build up and consolidation of debris along the margins as sea levels rose and fell. It lies on its own tectonic plate, the Sunda plate.

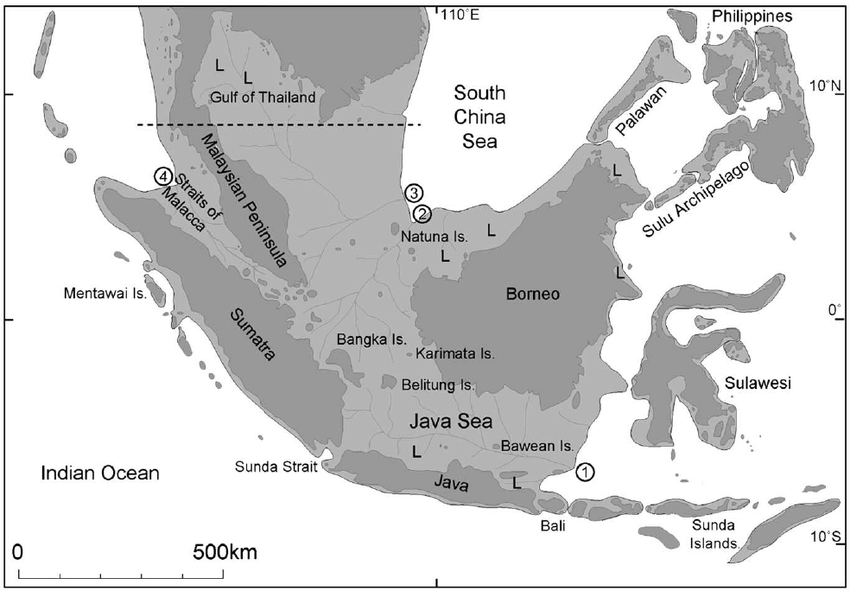
Sundaland during the Last Glacial Maximum

The seas between the islands cover relatively stable ancient peneplains that are characterised by low seismicity, low isostatic gravity anomalies and no active volcanoes with the exception of Sumatra, Java, and Bali, which while connected to the Sunda Shelf, belong geologically to the young Sunda Arc orogenic system (i.e., the Sunda Mountain System). During glacial periods, the sea level falls, and great expanses of the Sunda Shelf are exposed as a marshy plain. The rise of sea level during a meltwater pulse 14,600 to 14,300 years Before Present was as much as 16 meters within 300 years.

Present sea levels submerge a number of Pleistocene paleo river systems that drained much of Sundaland during the last glacial maximum 18,000 to 20,000 years ago.

To the east of the Sunda Shelf is the Sahul Shelf. Separating these two regions of shallow seas is Wallacea, which encompasses Sulawesi and the thousands of smaller islands making up Nusa Tenggara and Maluku. Within Wallacea lie some of the deepest seas in the world, with depths of up to 7,000 metres. Passing between Bali and Lombok, and Borneo and Sulawesi, Wallacea is marked by a transition zone of flora and fauna first described by Alfred Russel Wallace. The complicated history of island formation on the Sunda Shelf and changing landbridge connections with mainland Southeast Asia have resulted in a high degree of endemism and local distribution discontinuities, discussed at Sundaland, the biogeographical province that has resulted from these changes.

The exposure of the Sunda Shelf during eustatic sea level changes has effects on the El Niño oscillation.

W. Earle in 1845 was the first to describe the general features of the Sunda and Sahul Shelves, which he termed the "Great Asiatic Bank" and the "Great Australian Bank" respectively.

== Submerged river systems ==
Drawing of the presumed coast lines in South-East Asia and now submerged river systems, This drawing presumes a sea level of −120m compared to present day. This level was reached about 17000 years before present day. The assumed river beds are based on the surface contours of the sea bed in the area.

The paleo river systems of the Sunda Shelf are vast submerged river systems that extend present-day river systems and may be interpreted to follow topographic lows in a down-slope direction. During the driest period of the Pleistocene era (about 17,000 years BP) some four distinct catchment areas form the Malacca, Siam and Sunda river systems.

The Siam river system consists of a northern and a western arm. The northern arm extends the Chao Phraya River to drain the Gulf of Thailand. The western arm forming out of some rivers in central Sumatra flows through the Singapore Straits before joining up with the northern arm to empty into an estuary and the South China Sea to the north of North Natuna Island.

The Malacca Straits river system is formed by a joining of waters from northeastern Sumatra and the western Malay Peninsula, draining into the Andaman Sea.

The Northern Sunda river system, also known as the Great Sunda river system, or Molengraaff river system, was named after a Dutch biologist and geologist who traveled the region extensively in the late 19th century and first proposed the existence of this river system based on his observations in Borneo. The river, arising between Belitung Island and Borneo, flowed in a northeasterly direction, where it collected waters from some rivers in Central Sumatra and the rivers in Western and Northern Borneo, before flowing into the South China Sea between the North and South Natuna Islands.

Finally the Eastern Sunda river system emptied northern Java and southern Borneo, flowing in an easterly direction between Borneo and Java into the Java Sea.

== See also ==
- Prehistoric Indonesia
- Sahul Shelf
- Sundaland
- Sunda Shelf mangroves – (ecoregion)
