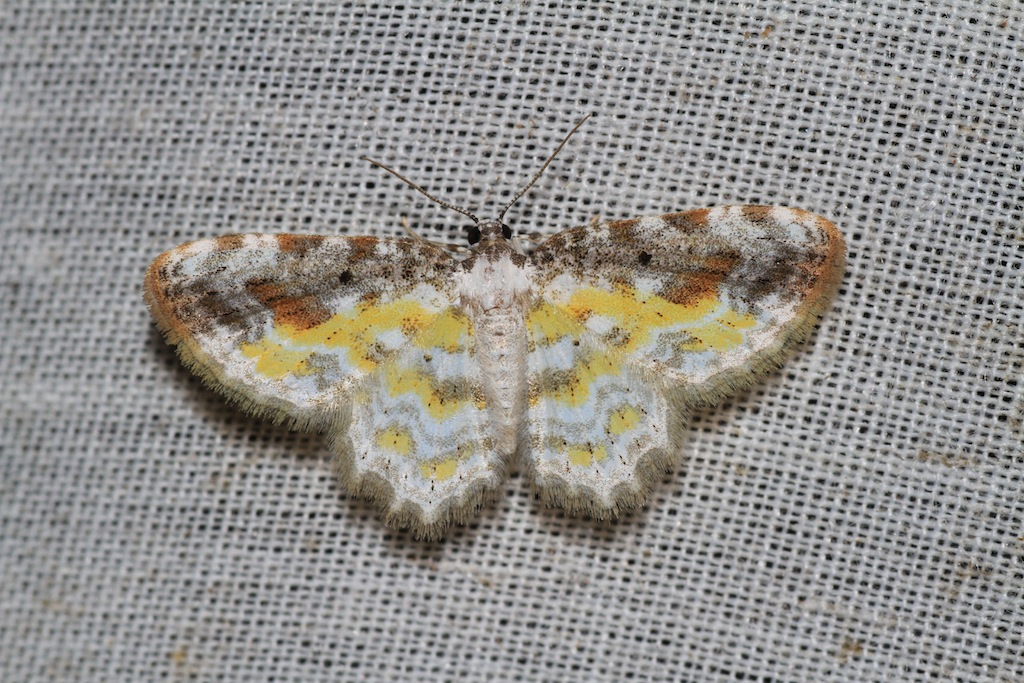

Scientific classification
- Kingdom: Animalia
- Phylum: Arthropoda
- Class: Insecta
- Order: Lepidoptera
- Family: Geometridae
- Genus: Acolutha
- Species: A. pictaria

Binomial name
- Acolutha pictaria (Moore, 1888)

Synonyms
- Emmelesia pictaria Moore, 1888; Acolutha imbecilla Warren, 1905; Acolutha canicosta Warren, 1906; Acolutha pictaria subflava Prout, 1932; Acolutha pictaria flavifascia Prout, 1935; Acolutha pictaria shirozui Inoue, 1955

= Acolutha pictaria =

Species of moth

Acolutha pictaria is a species of moth of the family Geometridae first described by Frederic Moore in 1888. It is found from the north-eastern part of the Himalayas and Tibet to Hong Kong, Sundaland, Wallacea, New Guinea and the Bismarck Islands.
