= Pangkak =

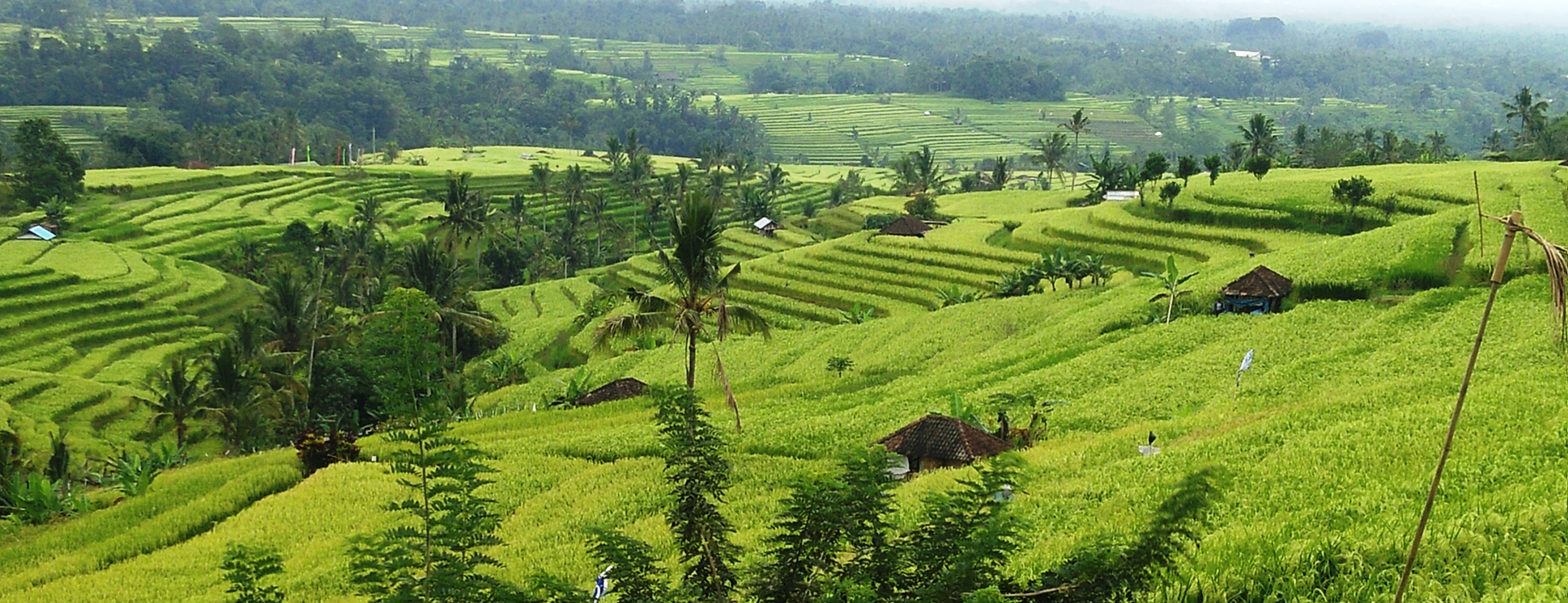
The paddy (rice) fields before harvest in Indonesia.

The Pangkak is a traditional Kangeanese rice harvest festival tradition and ceremony native to the Kangean Islands. These ceremony believed by the indigenous as a pure form of spiritualistic and gratitude towards God.

Pangkak could refers to the singing style performed throughout these ceremony as well, which resembles the similarity with a capella. Pangkak also later became a betrothal ritual among the Kangeanese people. This meeting of agricultural and life cycle rituals that makes sense: the celebration of fertility found in pangkak also implies an especially fertile marriage. This connection between pangkak and the engagement process is made explicit in the lyrics of the pangkak song tune: "Calm your mind, engaged one; Your bride-to-be will come to your home; When you see her, you’ll find your spirit”.

== See also ==
- Kangeanese people
- Seren Taun
