= Delias edela =

Scientific classification
- Kingdom: Animalia
- Phylum: Arthropoda
- Clade: Pancrustacea
- Class: Insecta
- Order: Lepidoptera
- Family: Pieridae
- Genus: Delias
- Species: D. edela

Binomial name
- Delias edela Fruhstorfer, 1910

Synonyms
- Delias poecilea edela

Species of butterfly

Delias edela is a butterfly in the family Pieridae. It was described by Hans Fruhstorfer in 1910. It is endemic to Obi Island, Indonesia. It is a very rare species. It is sometimes considered a subspecies of Delias poecilea.

== Description ==
Fruhstorfer in Seitz - edela subsp. nov. (54 d) from Obi. an island form which shows above a broad deep black apical area with 5 white oblong spots and very broad black border to the hindwing, at the distal margin of which are scattered 6 white dots.[male. female not known to Fruhstorfer]The wingspan is about 70–75 mm.

== Taxonomy ==
edela is a member of the hyparete species group.
