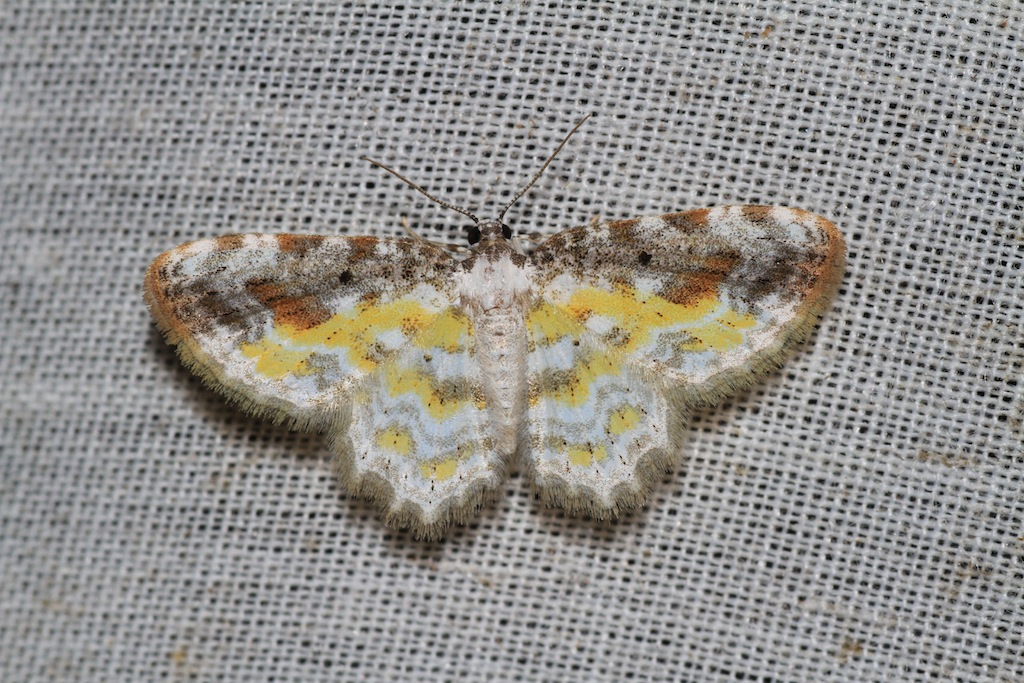
- Acolutha pictaria, Borneo

Scientific classification
- Kingdom: Animalia
- Phylum: Arthropoda
- Class: Insecta
- Order: Lepidoptera
- Family: Geometridae
- Subfamily: Larentiinae
- Genus: Acolutha; Warren, 1894

= Acolutha =

Genus of geometer moths

Acolutha is a genus of moths native to in the family Geometridae described by Warren in 1894. Its range extends from Borneo to New Guinea and the Bismarck Islands.

== Species ==
- Acolutha albipunctata (Holloway, 1976)
- Acolutha bicristipennis
- Acolutha canicosta
- Acolutha flavifascia
- Acolutha flavipictaria
- Acolutha flavivitta
- Acolutha imbecilla
- Acolutha interposita
- Acolutha pictaria (Moore, 1888)
- Acolutha poiensis
- Acolutha pulchella
- Acolutha semifulva
- Acolutha shirozui
- Acolutha subflava
- Acolutha subrotunda
- Acolutha talis
