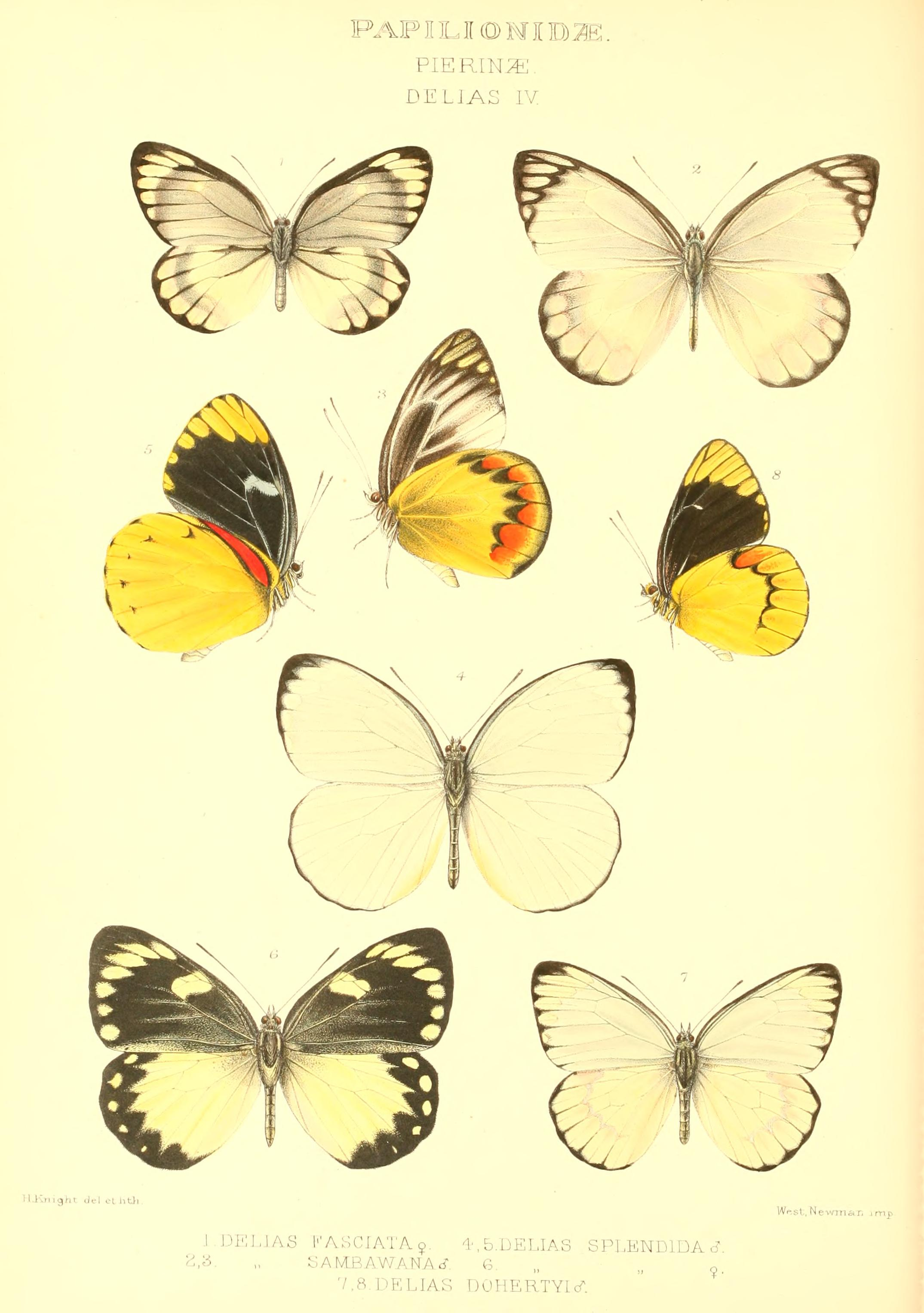
- In Henley Grose-Smith and William Forsell Kirby's Rhopalocera exotica

Scientific classification
- Kingdom: Animalia
- Phylum: Arthropoda
- Clade: Pancrustacea
- Class: Insecta
- Order: Lepidoptera
- Family: Pieridae
- Genus: Delias
- Species: D. fasciata

Binomial name
- Delias fasciata Rothschild, 1894

= Delias fasciata =

Species of butterfly

Delias fasciata is a butterfly in the family Pieridae. It was described by Walter Rothschild in 1894. It is found in the Australasian realm. It is endemic to Sumba.

== Description ==
Original 4. Delias fasciata sp. nov. Female. — Upperside : Forewings dull grey; costa, outer margin, and apical third black, with a large yellowish band of six spots occupying two-thirds of the black area. Hindwings greyish cream yellow, with the pattern of the underside showing through, and a deeply scalloped black border. Underside : Forewings yellowish white, more yellow towards the base. Costa and apical third black, the latter occupied by seven large sulphur-yellow patches. Hindwings bright yellow on basal two-thirds; outer third black, with seven large yellow patches, each of which has a large scarlet splash. Head and thorax above grey, abdomen greyish white : below, head grey, thorax greyish yellow, abdomen white. Expanse : 3 inches = 76 mm. Hab. Sumba (October, 1891). The wingspan is about 60–63 mm. Adults are similar to Delias periboea.

== Taxonomy ==
fasciata is a member of the hyparete species group.
