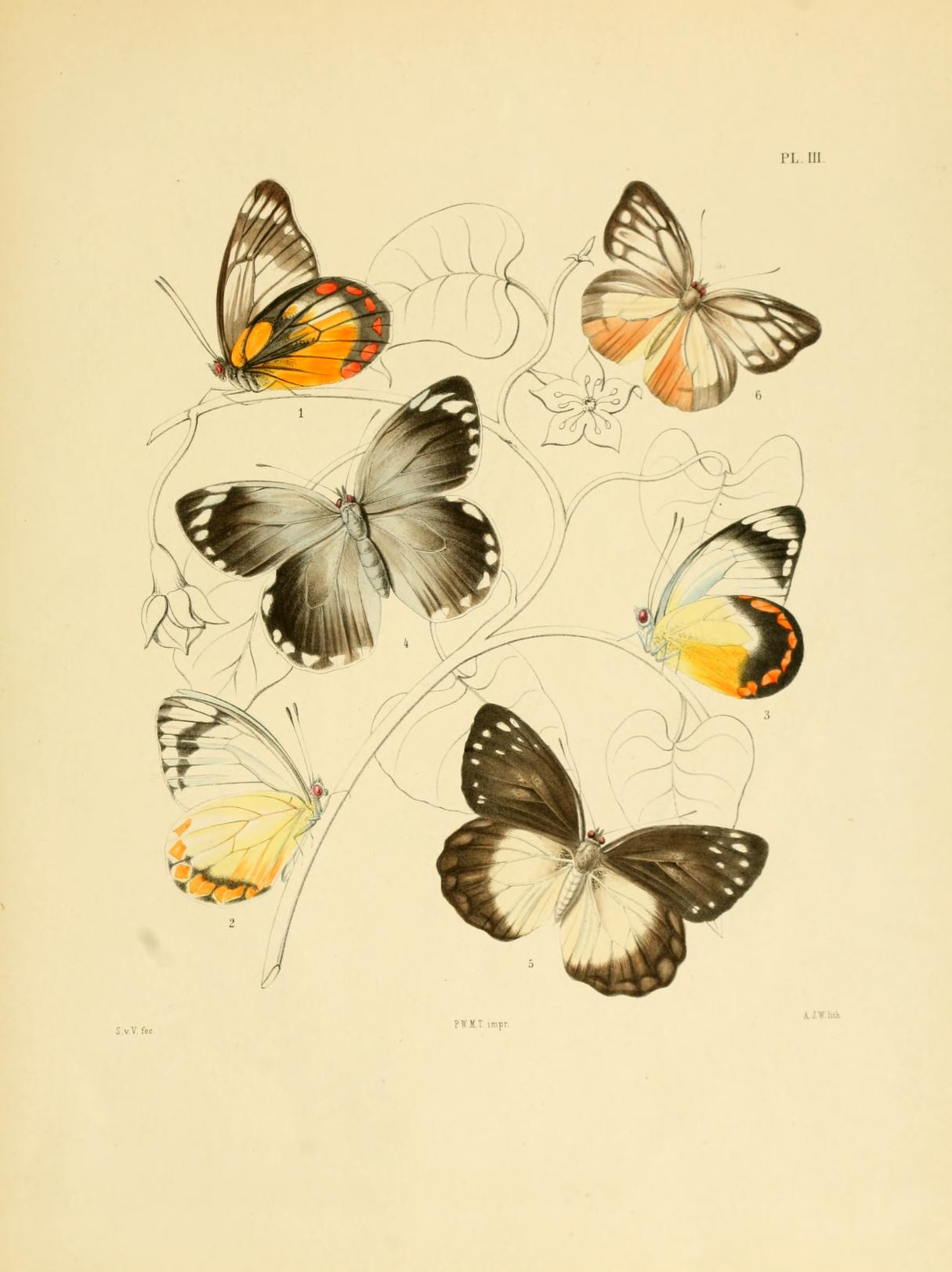
- Delias poecilea in Vollenhoven Essai d'une faune entomologique de l'archipel Indonéerlandais

Scientific classification
- Kingdom: Animalia
- Phylum: Arthropoda
- Class: Insecta
- Order: Lepidoptera
- Family: Pieridae
- Genus: Delias
- Species: D. poecilea

Binomial name
- Delias poecilea (Vollenhoven, 1865)

Synonyms
- Pieris poecilea Vollenhoven, 1865; Delias poecila; Delias poecila f. guentheri Kalis, 1933

= Delias poecilea =

Species of butterfly

Delias poecilea is a butterfly in the family Pieridae. It was described by Samuel Constantinus Snellen van Vollenhoven in 1865. It is found in the Australasian realm (Moluccas))

== Description ==
D. poecilia Voll. (54 d). Hitherto only known from the northern Moluccas. The red submarginal band of the hindwing beneath narrower than in edela subsp. nov. (54 d) from Obi. an island form which shows above a broad deep black apical area with 5 white oblong spots and very broad black border to the hindwing, at the distal margin of which are scattered 6 white dots. The female is unknown. The wingspan is about 62–70 mm.

== Subspecies ==
- D. p. poecilea (Halmahera, Bachan, Kasiruta, Mandioli)
- D. p. makikoae Yagishita, 1993 (Morotai)

== Taxonomy ==
poecilea is a member of the hyparete species group.
