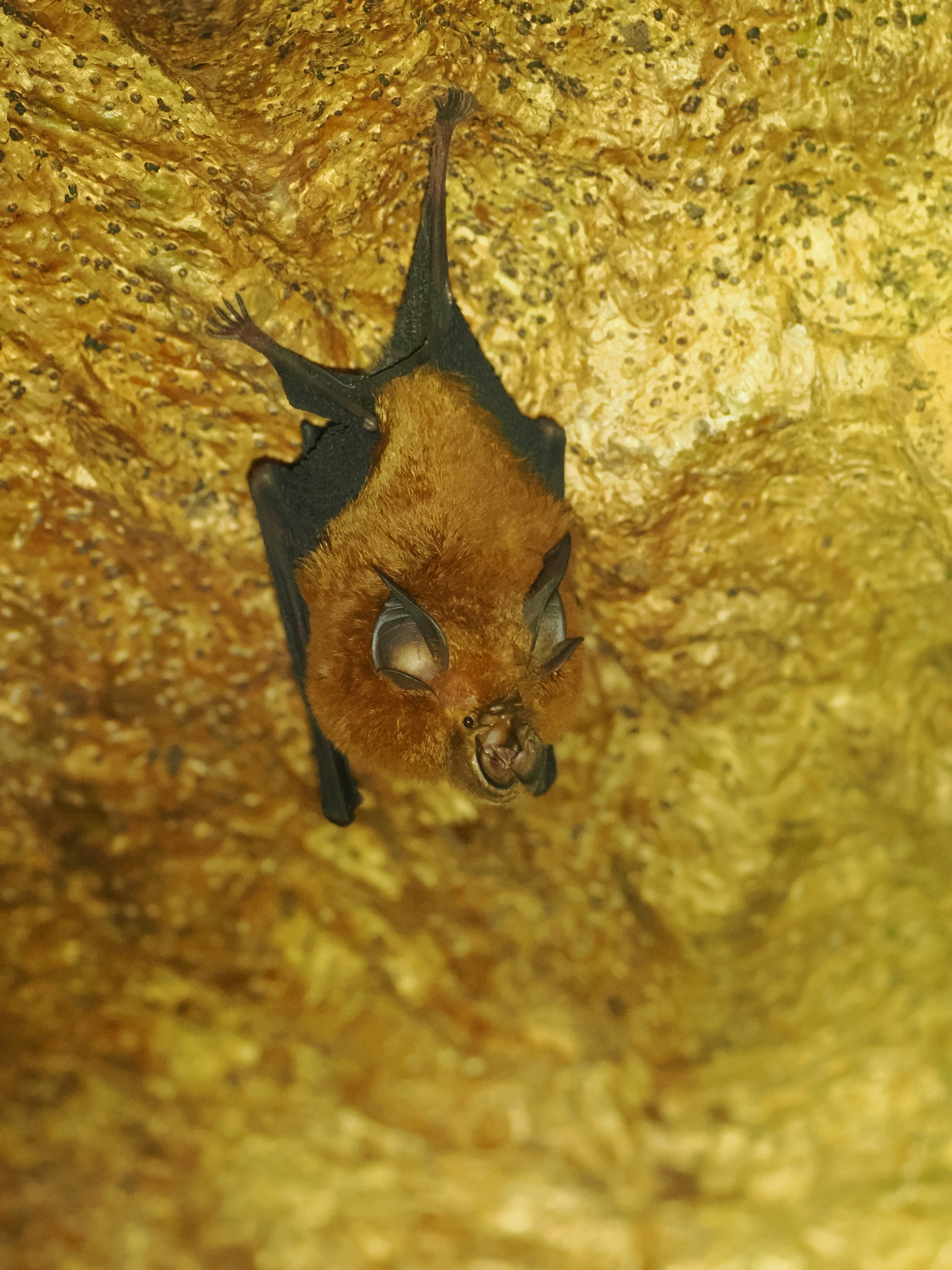

Conservation status
- Least Concern (IUCN 3.1)

Scientific classification
- Kingdom: Animalia
- Phylum: Chordata
- Class: Mammalia
- Infraclass: Placentalia
- Order: Chiroptera
- Family: Rhinolophidae
- Genus: Rhinolophus
- Species: R. celebensis

Binomial name
- Rhinolophus celebensis K. Andersen, 1905
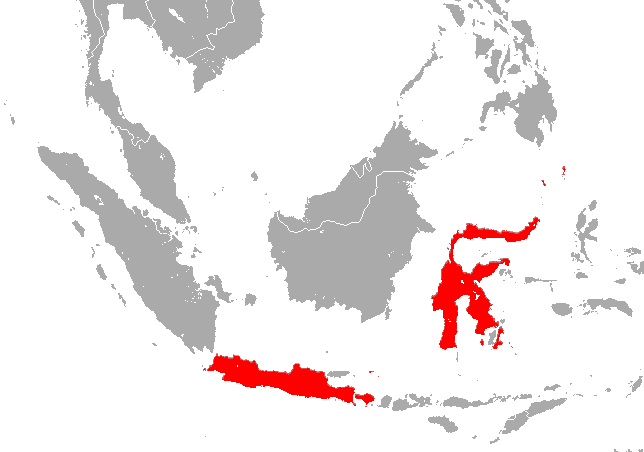
- Sulawesi horseshoe bat range

= Sulawesi horseshoe bat =

Species of bat

The Sulawesi horseshoe bat (Rhinolophus celebensis) is a species of bat in the family Rhinolophidae. It is endemic to Indonesia.
