= Australasian realm =

One of Earth's eight biogeographic realms

The Australasian realm (in orange)

The Australasian realm is one of eight biogeographic realms that is coincident with, but not (by some definitions) the same as, the geographical region of Australasia. The realm includes Australia, the island of New Guinea (comprising Papua New Guinea and the Indonesian province of Papua), and the eastern part of the Indonesian archipelago, including the island of Sulawesi, the Moluccas (the Indonesian provinces of Maluku and North Maluku), and the islands of Lombok, Sumbawa, Sumba, Flores, and Timor, often known as the Lesser Sundas.

The Australasian realm also includes several Pacific island groups, including the Bismarck Archipelago, Vanuatu, the Solomon Islands, and New Caledonia. New Zealand and its surrounding islands are a distinctive sub-region of the Australasian realm. The rest of Indonesia is part of the Indomalayan realm. In the classification scheme developed by Miklos Udvardy, New Guinea, New Caledonia, Solomon Islands and New Zealand are placed in the Oceanian realm.

== Geography ==
The outlined ecoregions of the Australasian realm, each of a colored biome. Note that this realm has 10 of 14 biomes, or major habitat types, as defined by Olson & Dinerstein, et al. (2001).: 01. Tropical and subtropical moist broadleaf forests; 02. Tropical and subtropical dry broadleaf forests; 03. Tropical and subtropical coniferous forests; 04. Temperate broadleaf and mixed forests; 05. Temperate coniferous forests; 06. Taiga and Boreal forest; 07. Tropical and subtropical grasslands, savannas, and shrublands; 08. Temperate grasslands, savannas, and shrublands; 09. Flooded grasslands and savannas; 10. Montane grasslands and shrublands; 11. Tundra; 12. Mediterranean forests, woodlands, and scrub; 13. Deserts and xeric shrublands; 14. Mangroves; Rock and Ice, or Abiotic Land Zones

From an ecological perspective the Australasian realm is a distinct region, parts of which have a common geologic and evolutionary history. The entire area has experienced a long period of biological isolation from other regions, and thus harbors a great many unique plants and animals. In this context, Australasia is limited to Australia, New Guinea, New Zealand, New Caledonia, and neighbouring islands, including the Indonesian islands from Lombok and Sulawesi eastward.

The Wallace Line to the west divides areas in the Indomalayan realm of tropical Asia which are or have at times been directly connected to the Asian mainland from islands that have never been so connected. Borneo and Bali lie on the western, Asian side. A second biological dividing line is Lydekker's Line, which similarly separates islands isolated by surrounding deep water from those associated with the Sahul Shelf of the Australian continent. Islands between the two lines (e.g. Sulawesi, the Moluccas and Lombok through Timor) form the biogeographical area of Wallacea, a transition zone between the Indomalayan and Australasian realms populated entirely by aerial or oceanic dispersal (although defined here as part of the Australasian realm).

== Geology ==
Australia, New Zealand and New Caledonia are all fragments of the ancient supercontinent Gondwana, the marks of which are still visible in the Christmas Island Seamount Province and other geophysical entities. These three land masses have been separated from other continents, and from one another, for tens of millions of years. All of Australasia shares the Antarctic flora, although the northern, tropical islands also share many plants with Southeast Asia.

Australia, New Guinea, and Tasmania are separated from one another by shallow continental shelves, and were linked together when the sea level was lower during ice ages. They share a similar fauna which includes marsupial and monotreme mammals and ratite birds. Eucalypts are the predominant trees in much of Australia and New Guinea. New Zealand has no native land mammals, but also had ratite birds, including the kiwi and the moa. The Australasian realm includes some nearby island groups, like Wallacea, the Bismarck Archipelago, Solomon Islands, and Vanuatu, which were not formerly part of Gondwana, but which share many characteristic plants and animals with Australasia.

== Ecology ==
Note that this zonation is based on flora; animals do not necessarily follow the same biogeographic boundaries. In the present case, many birds occur in both "Indomalayan" and "Australasian" regions, but not across the whole of either. On the other hand, there are few faunistic commonalities shared only by Australia and New Zealand, except some birds. Meanwhile, Australia, Melanesia and the Wallacea are united by a large share of similar animals, but few of these occur farther into the Pacific. On the other hand, much of the Polynesian fauna is related to that of Melanesia.

== See also ==
- Australasia – Subregion of Oceania
- Oceania – Geographical region in the Pacific Ocean

Ecoregion	Location(s)
Alai–Western Tian Shan steppe	Kazakhstan, Tajikistan, Uzbekistan
Altai steppe and semi-desert	Kazakhstan
Central Anatolian steppe	Turkey
Daurian forest steppe	China, Mongolia, Russia
Eastern Anatolian montane steppe	Armenia, Azerbaijan, Georgia, Iran, Turkey
Emin Valley steppe	China, Kazakhstan
Faroe Islands boreal grasslands	Faroe Islands, Denmark
Gissaro–Alai open woodlands	Kyrgyzstan, Tajikistan, Uzbekistan
Kazakh forest steppe	Kazakhstan, Russia
Kazakh steppe	Kazakhstan, Russia
Kazakh Uplands	Kazakhstan
Mongolian–Manchurian grassland	China, Mongolia, Russia
Pontic steppe	Kazakhstan, Moldova, Romania, Russia, Ukraine, Bulgaria
Sayan Intermontane steppe	Russia
Selenge–Orkhon forest steppe	Mongolia, Russia
South Siberian forest steppe	Russia
Syrian xeric grasslands and shrublands	Iraq, Jordan, Syria
Tian Shan foothill arid steppe	China, Kazakhstan, Kyrgyzstan
