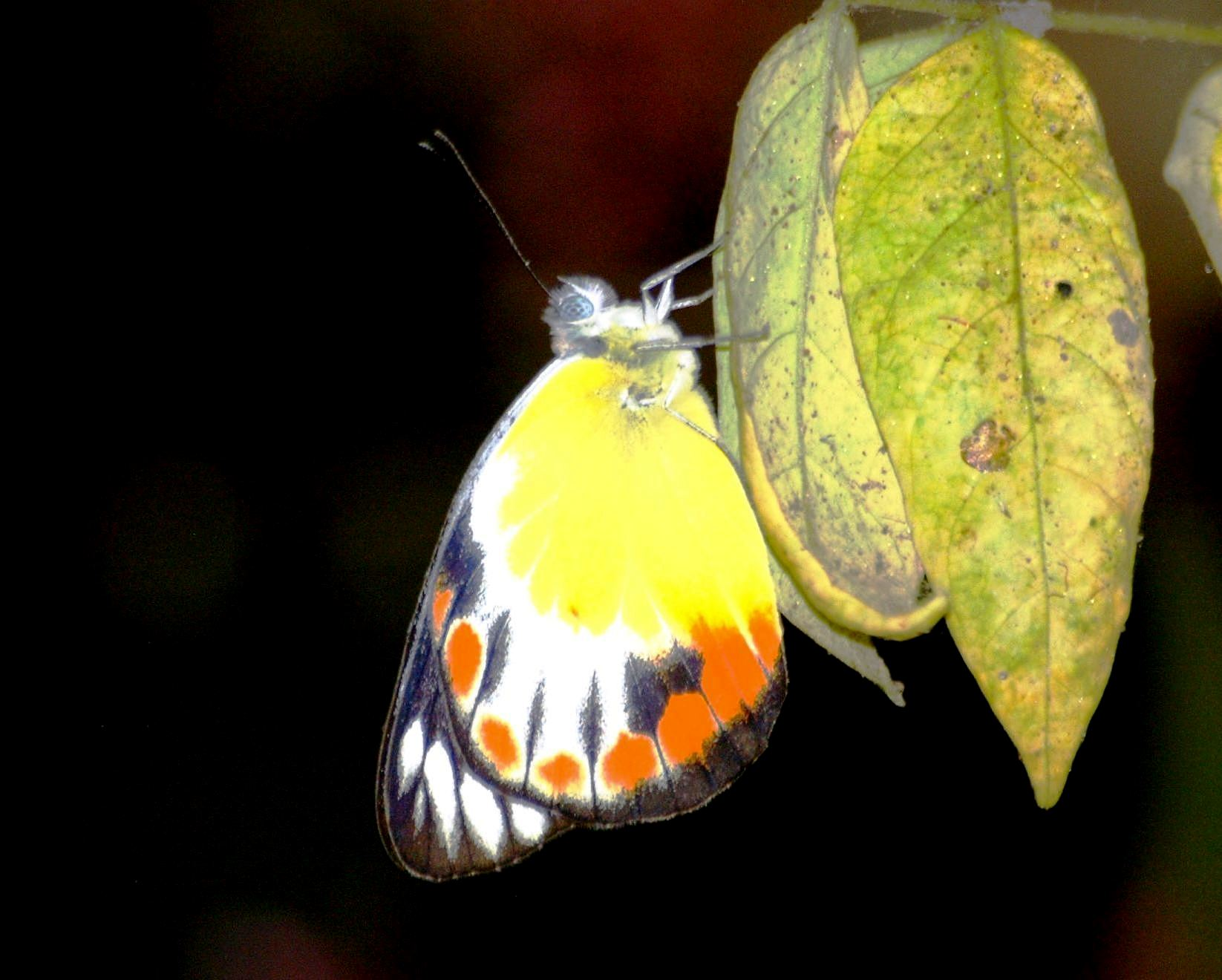
- Delias periboea periboea male Java
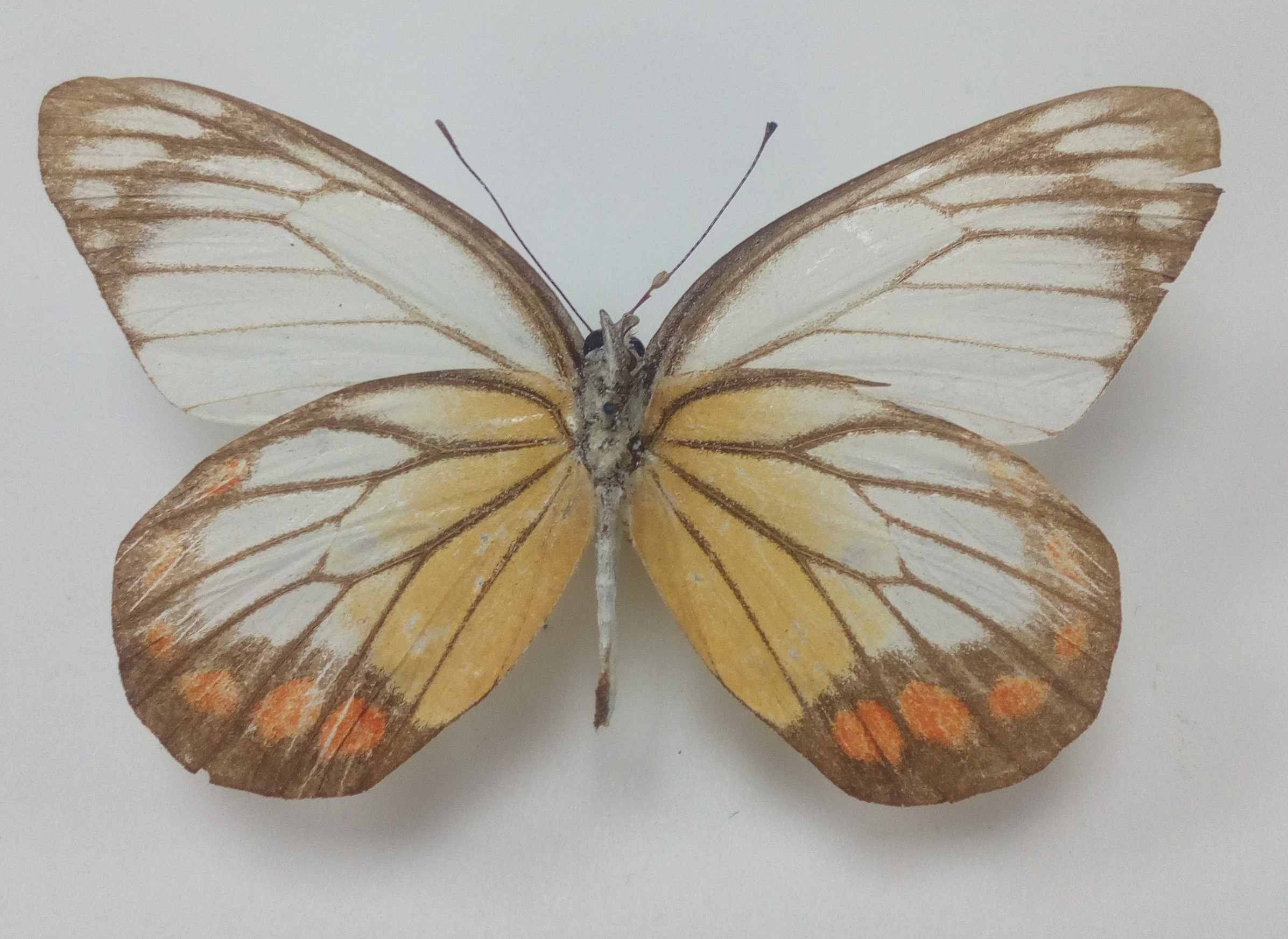

Scientific classification
- Kingdom: Animalia
- Phylum: Arthropoda
- Class: Insecta
- Order: Lepidoptera
- Family: Pieridae
- Genus: Delias
- Species: D. periboea

Binomial name
- Delias periboea (Godart, 1819)

Synonyms
- Pieris periboea Godart, 1819; Delias periboea var. wallacei Rothschild, 1892

= Delias periboea =

Species of butterfly

Delias periboea is a butterfly in the family Pieridae. It was described by Jean-Baptiste Godart in 1819. It is found in both the Indomalayan realm and the Australasian realm; East and West of the Wallace line.

== Description ==
D. periboea Godt. (51 e), a variable species, which is very local on Java, but in some years occurs abundantly-even in large towns, such as Soerabaja and Bandong. — wallacei Rothsch. is the name of the race from Bali. somewhat more broadly striped beneath, which has been erroneously described as being from Celebes in consequence of a mistake on the part of the collector Doherty. — livia Fruhst. (56 d) is a form discovered on Lombok at an elevation of about 2000 ft., which has always much fewer and narrower red patches on the hindwing beneath. — pagenstecheri Fruhst. may be recognised by the shorter black stripes on the under surface and the washed-out submarginal spots of the hindwing, which are more orange-coloured than red. Sumbawa, rare. — alorensis Fruhst. (52 a) is the most easterly offshoot yet known, distinguished by broader light yellow subapical spots on the forewing, dark ochre-yellow tinge at the base and a complete row of intensively red submarginal spots on the hindwing, which appear on the upperside as faint pale pink spots. Upper surface of the hindwing light yellow instead of whitish or grey-blue as in the eastern subspecies of periboea.

== Subspecies ==
- D. p. periboea (Java, Kangean Islands)
- D. p. alorensis Fruhstorfer, 1899 (Alor)
- D. p. floresiana Roepke, 1954(Flores)
- D. p. livia Fruhstorfer, 1896 (Lombok)
- D. p. atakei Nakano, 1993 (Kangean)
- D. p. pagenstecheri Fruhstorfer, 1896 (Sumba)
- D. p. wallacei Rothschild, 1892 (Bali)

== Taxonomy ==
periboea is a member of the isse species group.
