= Kangean people =

Ethnic group in Indonesia

Oréng Kangéan (Kangean)
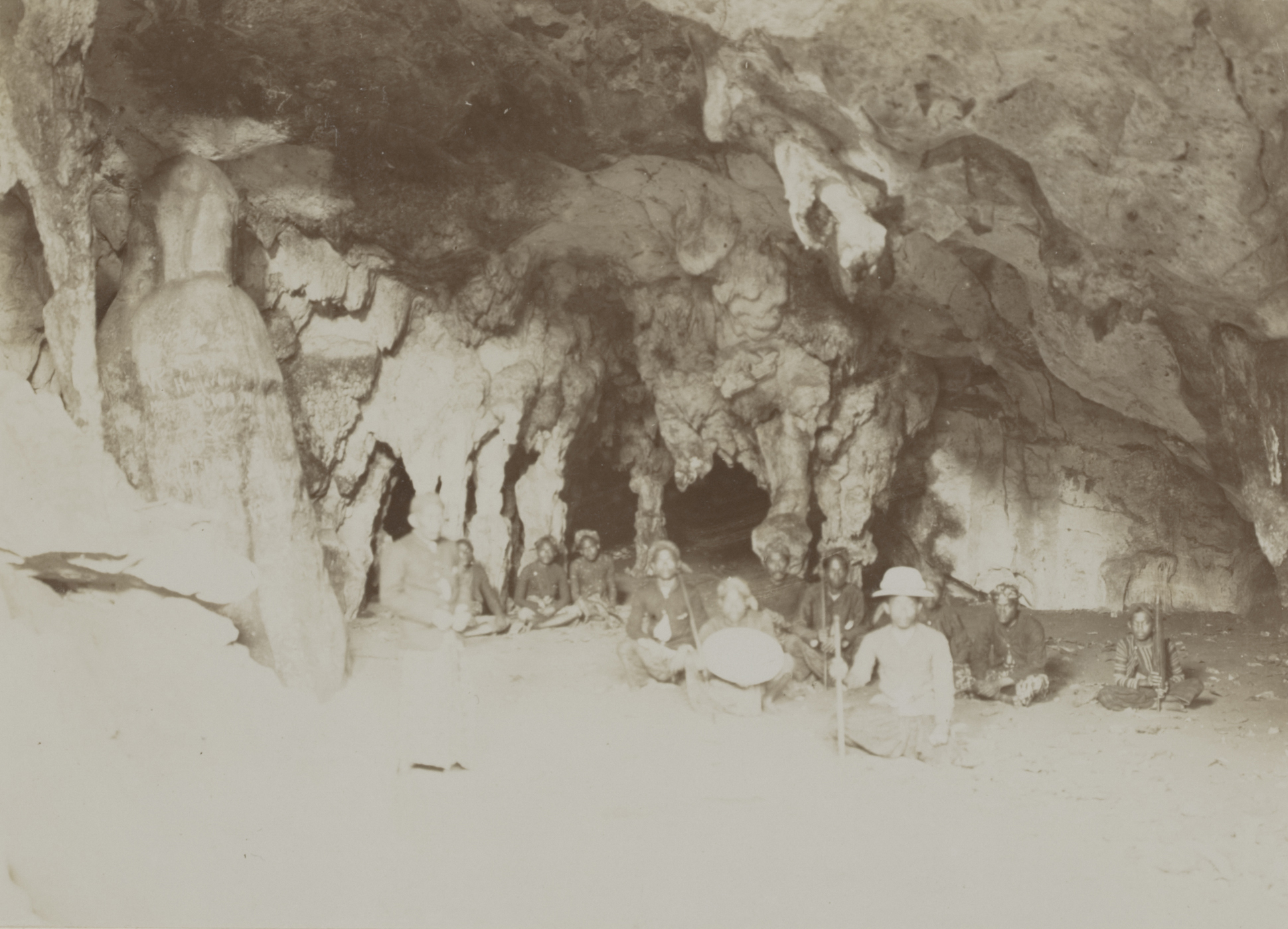
- The native Kangeanese men during Siboga Expedition in Gua Koneng Cave, Arjasa, Kangean, c. 1899.

Total population
- c. 125,840 (2013)

Regions with significant populations
- Indonesia (Kangean Islands, East Java)

Languages
- Kangean

Religion
- Islam (Sunni)

Related ethnic groups
- Madurese, Buginese, and other Austronesian peoples

The Kangean people (Kangean: Oréng Kangéan; Indonesian: Orang Kangean; IPA: Indonesian: [kaˈŋean], Javanese: [kaˈŋe(j)an]) is an Austronesian ethnic group native to the Indonesian island of Kangean and its surrounding islands. The Kangeanese population of c.125,840 live mostly on the island of Kangean, making up c.90% of the island's population.

== Tradition ==
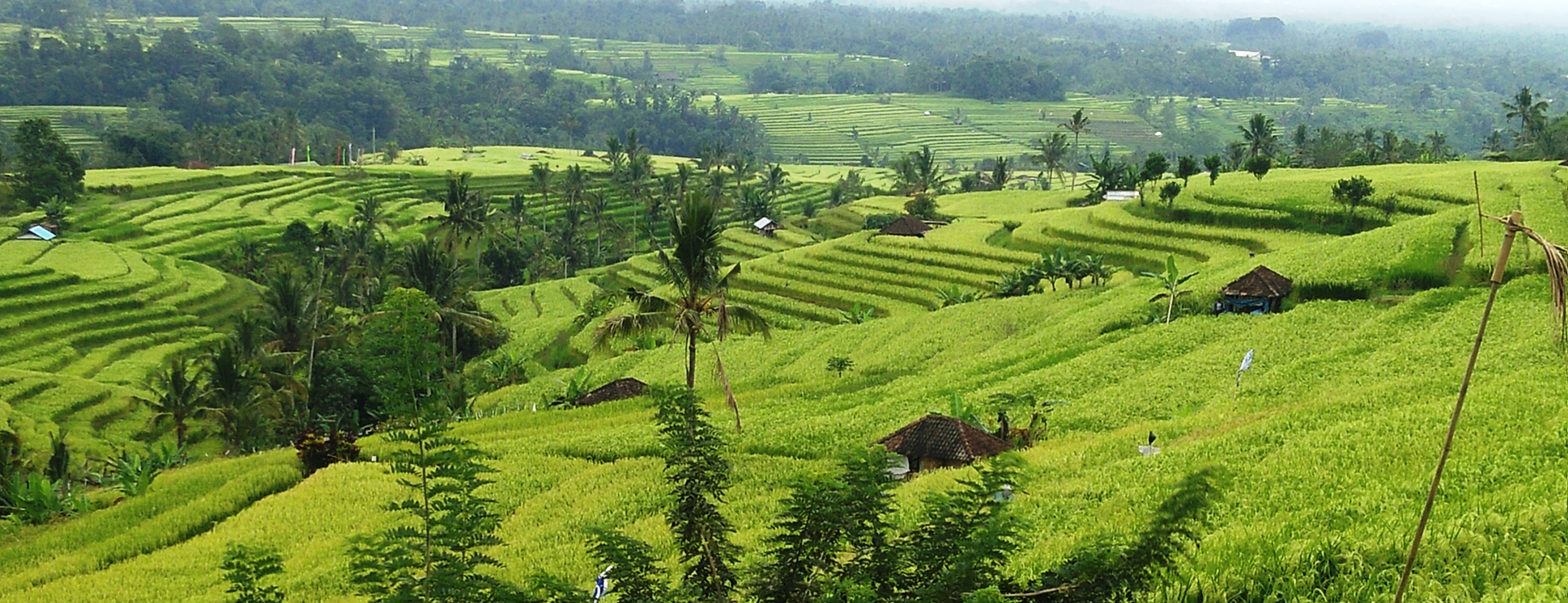
The paddy (rice) fields before harvest in Indonesia.

=== Pangkak ===
The Pangkak tradition is native to Kangean. Pangkak derived from Kangean word of aranggak, aranggĕk, paranggak or paranggĕk which means 'cut' or 'cutting', referred to reaping process in paddy (rice) harvesting activities. Pangkak is a tradition to celebrate the rice harvest. The implementation of this traditional art is a form of gratitude for the natural products that people get through agriculture. Kangeanese people believes pangkak ceremony is a pure spiritual form and a sign of gratitude towards God in return for a successful harvest. Pangkak also referred to the a cappella singing style played during the pangkak harvest ceremony. Pangkak also later reformed as a proposal rituals tradition among Kangeanese people. It is a meeting of agricultural and life cycle rituals that makes sense: the celebration of fertility found in pangkak would carry on for an especially fertile marriage. This connection between pangkak and the engagement process is made explicit in the lyrics of the pangkak song tune: "Calm your mind, engaged one; Your bride-to-be will come to your home; When you see her, you’ll find your spirit.". The pangkak ceremony often accompanied by traditional arts using Gendeng Dumik means the little gendang (traditional drums), and sometimes Pencak Silat is also performed.

"Ambololo hak-hak,
Ambololo harra,
Akadi ombĕk gulina padi,
Masa aranggĕk terbhik padi,
Togur réng tani lebur éola diyĕ,
Māsa réng tani aranggĕk padi.

Ambololo hak-hak,
Ambololo harra,
Gumbhira kejung sambi ātāndhĕng,
Ka’dissa oréng laké nabbu gendĕng,
Tāl-ontālan pālotan sambi ātandhĕng,
Tandĕ nyaré juduh ate lodang,
Ambololo hak-hak,
Ambololo harra."
"Ambololo hak-hak,
Ambololo harra,
The paddy (rice) swings like the ocean waves,
The harvest time is near,
The farmers' cabin has wonderful views,
It's the time for farmers to harvest the paddy (rice).

Ambololo hak-hak,
Ambololo harra,
Cheerful song while dancing,
There the man beats the gendang (drums),
Throwing palotan (glutinous rice) one after another,
It's the sign of soulmates are sought,
Ambololo hak-hak,
Ambololo harra."

— The mantra chanted during the pangkak proposal rituals by the local pawang (a type of shaman).

== Culture ==
=== Gotong-royong ===
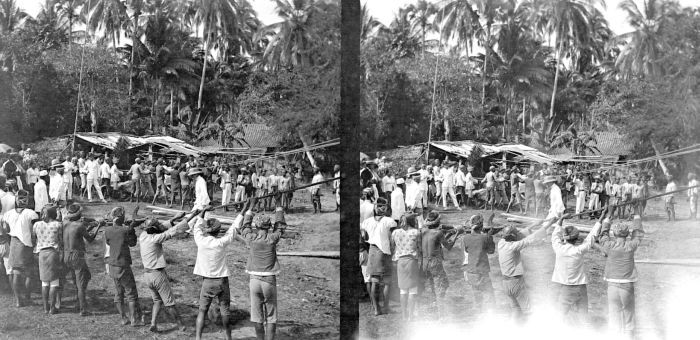
The Kangeanese work together to assist in launching large prahu to the coastal area of Kangean in 1920.

Gotong-royong is a conception of sociality ethos familiar to Indonesia (and to a wider extent might also include Malay world countries). In Indonesian languages especially Javanese, gotong means 'carrying a burden using one's shoulder', while royong means 'together' or 'communally', thus the combined phrase gotong royong can be translated literally as 'joint bearing of burdens'. It translates to working together, helping each other, or mutual assistance. Village's public facilities, such as irrigations, streets, and the house of worship (village's mosques, churchs, and puras) are usually constructed in gotong royong way, where the funds and materials are collected mutually. The traditional communal events, such as slametan ceremony are also usually held in goyong royong ethos of communal work spirit, which each member of society are expected to contribute and participate in the endeavor harmoniously.

The phrase has been translated into English in many ways, most of which hearken to the conception of reciprocity or mutual aid. For M. Nasroen, gotong royong forms one of the core tenets of Indonesian philosophy. Paul Michael Taylor and Lorraine V. Aragon state that "gotong royong is cooperation among many people to attain a shared goal."

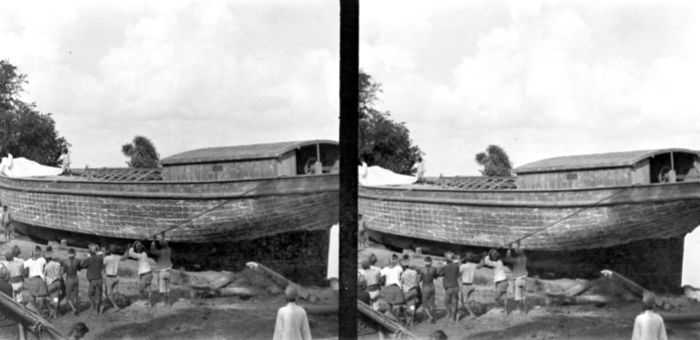
The typical Kangeanese prahu at Kangean in 1920.

== Folklore ==
=== Lanun ===
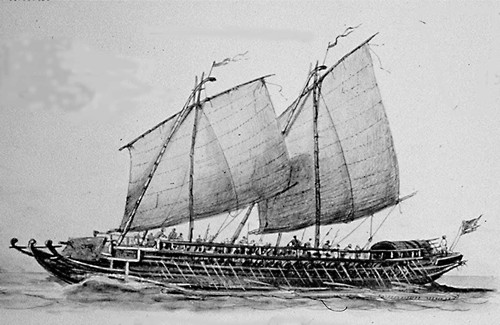
1890 illustration by Rafael Monleón of a late 19th-century Iranun lanong (the lanun warship) with three banks of oars under full sail

The Lanun (also known as Lanon or Lanong) or Késah Lanun is the folklore of Kangean. The term lanun is believed to be derived from Maguindanao word of lanao which referred to Lanao lake in Mindanao, Philippines. Spanish and Tausūg people called the Maranao as illano, illanun, or ilanun. The historical reconstruction shows that the Maguindanao carried out pirate activities and controlled the territorial waters of Riau, Java Sea, the Makassar Strait to Papua. People who were targeted by Maguindanao pirates called the pirate activities as lanun. The term Lanun later became a new vocabulary in the areas targeted by the Maguindanao pirates. Lanun as the people's vocabulary who were targeted by pirates especially from Maguindanao and is used to refer to the pirates. The pirates by Kangeanese people are called lanun. This means that in this area pirate activities are carried out by the Maguindanao people. The emergence of the vocabulary is related to the historical background of the local community, in this case, pirates.

According to Jan Harold Brunvand in his book "The Study of American Folklore", the folklore can be classified into three main categories: verbal, partly verbal, and non-verbal. Referring to the division of folklore, Kangeanese folklore of Lanun includes verbal and partly verbal folklore. Verbal folklore is because its inheritance is carried out verbally, while folklore is partly verbal because of the verbal folklore partly manifested in the form of food called jejen lanun which means the traditional snacks of lanun. The jejen lanun represents a symbolic strategy for the Kangeanese people to fight against the lanun (pirates).

The lanun story explains the history of human settlements, and the power relations with the political, economic, and cultural power of the Kangeanese people with people from various regions and members of the world system. On the other hand, these various forces explain the integration process in the Kangean area. By itself, the lanun story can be used as a source of regional history. One of the most important pirate bases is Toli-Toli, North Sulawesi. Next to the Makassar Strait, the pirates had bases so this traffic was not safe for commercial shipping at that time. In the southern part of the Makassar Strait they established a base on Laut Island (South Kalimantan) near Kangean Island. According to Pangeran Said Al Habsyi (1830), the Lanun people on Laut Island collaborated with the leader of Bangkalan called Haji Jawa (who came from Kalimantan), and the Bajau and Tobelo from Halmahera. Laut Island is used to explore the waters of the Flores Sea and the Java Sea. The historical reconstruction shows the position of the Kangean Island being in the middle of the intersection of several pirate bases (lanun), so it makes sense for Kangeanese people to have folklore about lanun. The Kangeanese people mention lanun whenever they are asked about the occurrence of settlement in the hills (dera`). The settlement pattern in the hills is surrounded by living fences, thickets with one big door made of wood to protect against lanun attacks. The existence of one entrance has the function of supervising the activities of residents and outsiders. When there was a lanun attack, the door was closed and residents tried to defend themselves. Settlements in hilly areas (dera`) are scattered in the regions of Kangayan, Torjek, Laok Jangjang, Cangkramaan, and Dandung.

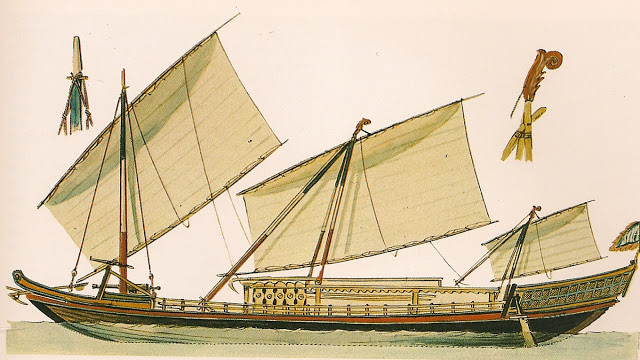
Colored detail of a lanong (lanun warship) by Rafael Monleón

== Religion ==
The majority of Kangeanese people are Muslims (Sunni Islam). Before the adoption of Hinduism, Buddhism and Islam, the natives of the Indonesian archipelago believed in powerful but unseen spiritual entities that can be both benevolent or malevolent. They also believed that the deceased ancestor is not gone away or disappeared completely. The ancestral spirit may gain god-like spiritual power and remain involved in their offspring's worldly affairs. That is why the veneration and reverence to honor ancestors is an important element in the belief system of native ethnic groups in Indonesia, including the Kangeanese. Some Kangeanese people still preserved this ancient beliefs and also assimilated into the common religion in Kangean (notably Islam), resulting in the new belief known as the Folk Islam.

== See also ==
- Kangean Islands
- Kangean language
- Javanisation
