= Sahul Shelf =

Continental shelf of Western Australia

Coordinates: 9.6°S 131.7°E

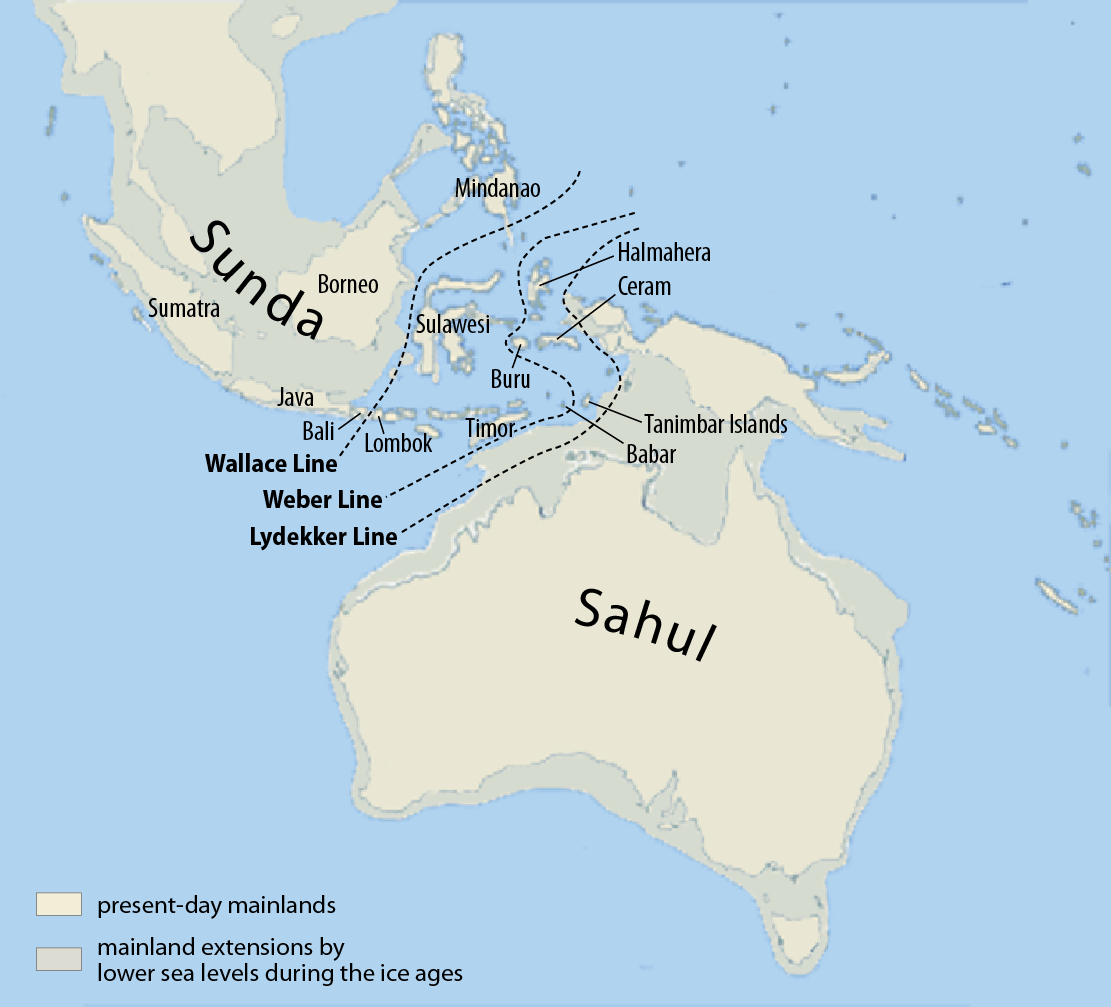
Map of Sahul and Sunda

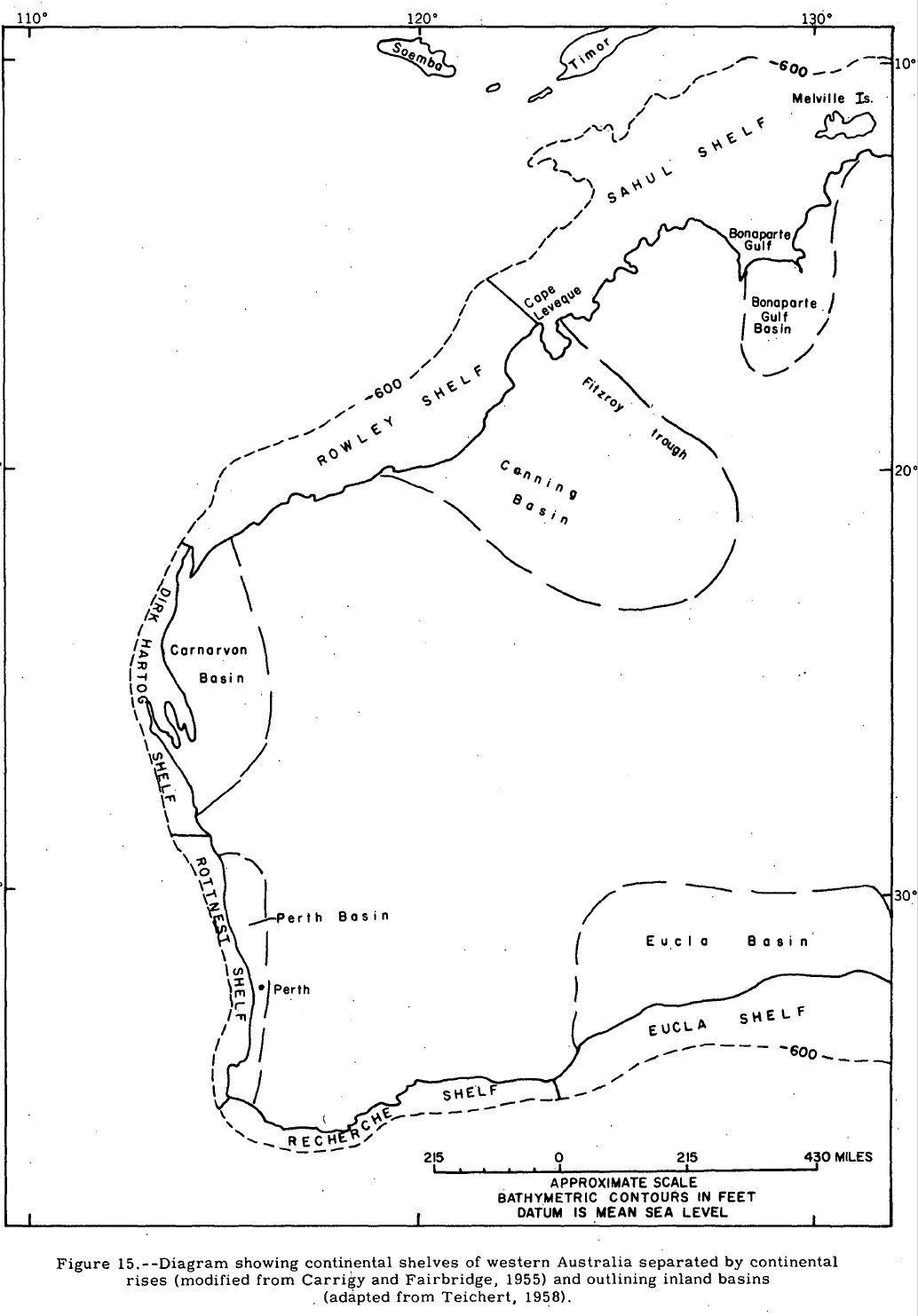
Continental shelves of Western Australia, showing the Sahul Shelf in the northeast. More broadly defined, the Sahul Shelf extends southwest to encompass the Rowley Shelf.

Geologically, the Sahul Shelf (/səˈhuːl/) is a part of the continental shelf of the Australian continent, lying off the northwest coast of mainland Australia.

== Etymology ==
The name "Sahull" or "Sahoel" appeared on 17th century Dutch maps applied to a submerged sandbank between Australia and Timor. On his 1803 map, Matthew Flinders noted the "Great Sahul Shoal" where Indonesians came from Makassar to fish for trepang (sea cucumber). The name Sahul Shelf (Dutch: Sahoel-plat) was coined in 1919 by G.A.F. Molengraaff, an authority on the geology of the then Dutch East Indies.

== Geography ==
The Sahul Shelf proper stretches northwest from Australia much of the way under the Timor Sea towards Timor, ending where the seabed begins descending into the Timor Trough. To the northeast, the Sahul Shelf merges into the Arafura Shelf, which runs from the northern coast of Australia under the Arafura Sea north to New Guinea. The Aru Islands rise from the Arafura Shelf. The Sahul Shelf is sometimes taken to also include the Rowley Shelf to the southwest of Cape Leveque, girding the north coast of Western Australia as far as North West Cape.

The existence of an extensive Sahul Shelf was suggested in 1845 by George Windsor Earl who called it the "Great Australian Bank" and noted that macropods (kangaroos) were found on Australia, New Guinea, and the Aru Islands. Earl also suggested the existence of the Sunda Shelf (which he called the "Great Asiatic Bank") covering the western Malay Archipelago and the Malay Peninsula. In the 1970s, biogeographers coined "Sundaland" and "Sahul" as contrastive names for the continental regions extending from the adjacent shelves.

== Geology ==
When sea levels fell during the Pleistocene ice age, including the Last Glacial Maximum about 18,000 years ago, the Sahul Shelf was exposed as dry land. Evidence of the shoreline of this time has been identified in locations which now lie 100 to 140 metres below sea level.

A Flash-based interactive timeline of sea level changes was developed by Monash University in the 2000s.

== Ecology ==
The Arafura Shelf formed a land bridge between Australia, New Guinea, and the Aru Islands, and these lands share many Marsupial mammals, land birds, and freshwater fish as a result. Lydekker's Line, a biogeographical line, runs along the northwestern edge of the Sahul Shelf where it drops off into the deep waters of the Wallacea biogeographical area. Wallacea sits in a gap between the Sahul Shelf and the Sunda Shelf, part of the continental shelf of Southeast Asia.

Notable past (purple) and current (orange) land bridges on a bathymetric equirectangular projection centred on 45° E

== See also ==
- Australia (continent)
- Australian Plate
- Indo-Australian Plate
- Sahul
- Sunda Shelf
- Sundaland
