= Kangean language =

Austronesian language spoken in Indonesia

Kangean
- Bĕsa Kangéan, Bhânta Kangèyan, or Oca' Kangèyan
- Pronunciation: /kʌŋɛʌn/
- Native to: Indonesia
- Region: Kangean Islands
- Ethnicity: Kangean
- Native speakers: (110,000 cited 2000 census)
- Language family: Austronesian: Malayo-Polynesian; Malayo-Sumbawan (?); Madurese; Kangean
- Dialects: Western Kangean; Central Kangean; Eastern Kangean
- Writing system: Latin; Carakan; Pegon

Official status
- Regulated by: Language Development and Fostering Agency: East Java Language Center

Language codes
- ISO 639-3: kkv
- Glottolog: kang1289

Kangean (Bĕsa Kangéan, Bhânta Kangèyan, or Oca' Kangèyan) is a Austronesian language spoken by the Kangean ethnic group, an ethnic group originating from Kangean Island in the Kangean Islands region, north of the Bali Sea.

== Writing system ==
Viewed from an ethnolinguistic perspective from the discovery of inscriptions on the Kangean Islands, the original Kangean language is unknown or it can be concluded that so far it does not have its own traditional script. From time to time, the use of scripts from other languages has been used to write literary works in the Kangean language, including the Carakan, Lontara, Mangkasara, Pegon, and the Latin scripts which is currently the most frequently used.

=== Latin ===
The Kangean language is present generally written in the 26-letter Latin script, but the use of the letters ⟨X⟩ and ⟨Z⟩ is generally rare in everyday life except in names. In Dutch colonial times, the Latin script used in Kangean had diacritics like the Latin script for Old Javanese used to distinguish sounds in words; for example, the word tepaq (transl. har. 'appropriate') used to be written as tĕppaq, but nowadays Kangean tends to be written without diacritics and has undergone spelling standardization following Javanese spelling but simpler (for example, the word bathik in Javanese would be spelled as batik in Kangean).

Uppercase	Lowercase	IPA
A	a	/aː/
B	b	/bʱeː/
C	c	/t͡ʃeː/
D	d	/d̪eː/
E	e	/eː/
F	f	/ɛf/
G	g	/geː/
H	h	/haː/
I	i	/iː/
J	j	/d͡ʒeː/
K	k	/kaː/
L	l	/ɛl/
M	m	/ɛm/
N	n	/ɛn/
O	o	/oː/
P	p	/peː/
Q	q	/kɪ/
R	r	/ɛr/
S	s	/ɛs/
T	t	/teː/
U	u	/uː/
V	v	/veː/
W	w	/weː/
X	x	/eːks/
Y	y	/jeː/
Z	z	/zɛt/

== Relatednees ==
=== Comparison ===
Kangean	Makassarese	Buginese	Madurese	Balinese
jukoq	jukuʼ	juku	jhukoʼ	jukut
side dish	fish	meat	fish	side dish; dish

Kangean	Makassarese	Bugis	Madurese	Baliness
cakalang	cakalang	cikalang	cakalan	cakal (large tuna)
large tuna	large tuna	large tuna	large tuna	

Kangean	Makassarese	Buginese	Madurese	Balinese
langoy	lange	nange	langngoy (swimming)	langi
				swimming
swimming	swimming	swimming		

== See also ==
- Kangean people
- Madurese language
