= Wallace Line =

Line separating Asian and Australian fauna

Wallace's Line delineates Australian and Southeast Asian fauna. The probable extent of land at the time of the Last Glacial Maximum, when the sea level was more than 110 m (360 ft) lower than today, is shown in grey. The deep water of the Lombok Strait between Bali and Lombok formed a water barrier even when lower sea levels linked the now-separated islands and landmasses on either side.

The Wallace Line or Wallace's Line is a faunal boundary line drawn in 1859 by the British naturalist Alfred Russel Wallace and named by the English biologist Thomas Henry Huxley. It separates the biogeographic realms of Asia and "Wallacea", a transitional zone between Asia and Australia formerly also called the Malay Archipelago and the Indo-Australian Archipelago (present-day Indonesia).

To the west of the line are found organisms related to Asiatic species; to the east, a mixture of species of Asian and Australian origins is present. Wallace noticed this clear division in both land mammals and birds during his travels through the East Indies in the 19th century.

== Description ==
The line runs through Indonesia: through the Makassar Strait between Borneo and Sulawesi and through the Lombok Strait between Bali and Lombok, where the distance is strikingly small, only about 35 kilometers (22 mi), but enough for a contrast between the species present on the two islands.

The complex biogeography of the Indo-Australian Archipelago is a result of its location at the merging point of four major tectonic plates and other semi-isolated microplates in combination with ancient sea levels. Those caused the isolation of different taxonomic groups on islands at present relatively close to each other. Wallace's Line is one of the many boundaries drawn by naturalists and biologists since the mid-19th century intended to delineate constraints on the distribution of the fauna and flora of the archipelago.

== Historical context ==
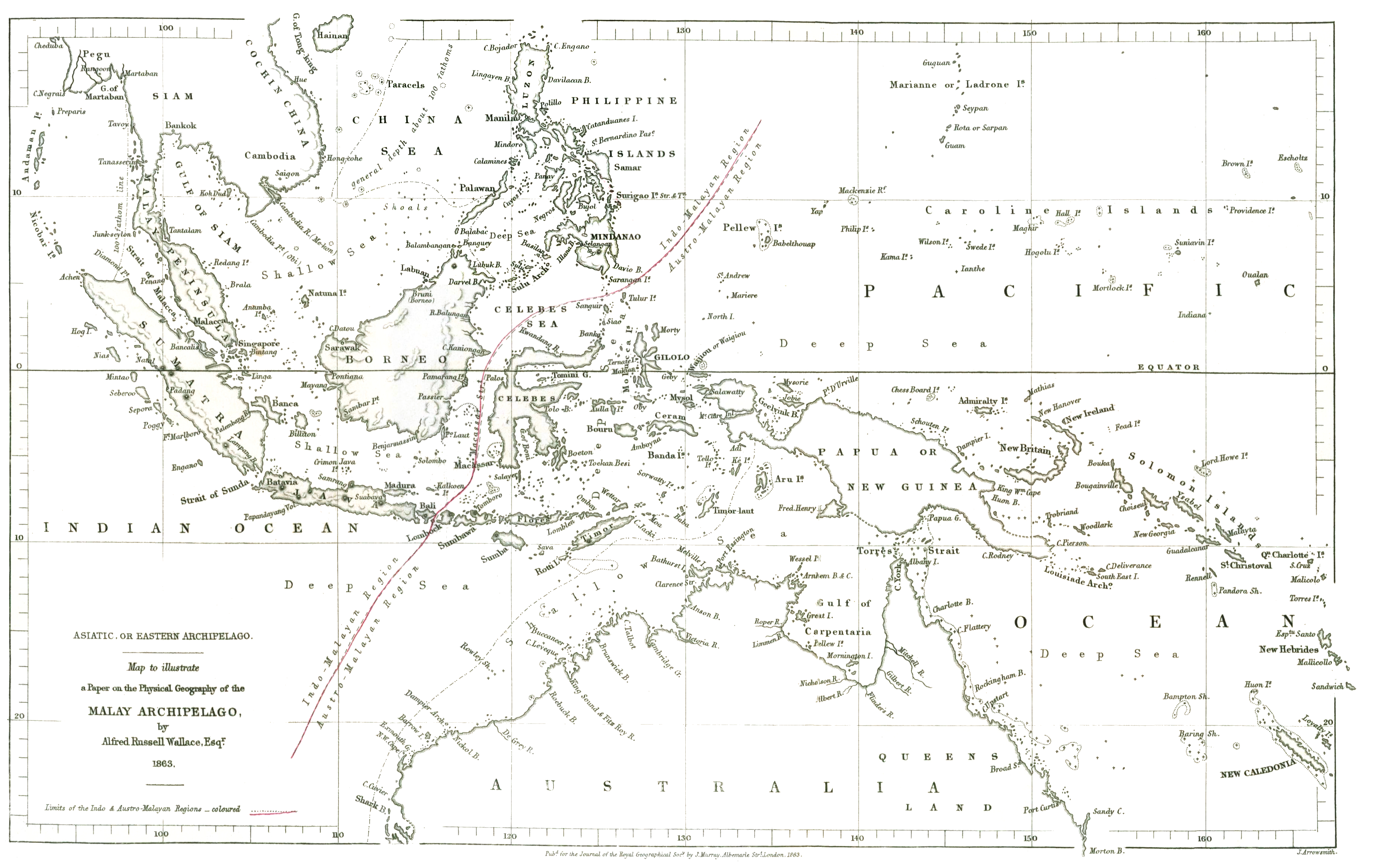
The original drawing of the line in Wallace's paper

One of the earliest descriptions of the biodiversity in the Indo-Australian Archipelago dates back to 1521 when Venetian explorer Antonio Pigafetta recorded the biological contrasts between the Philippines and the Maluku Islands (Spice Islands) (on opposite sides of Wallace's Line) during the continuation of the voyage of Ferdinand Magellan after Magellan had been killed on Mactan.

In 1845, the English navigator G. W. Earl published his observations in faunal differences between the islands in the Indo-Australian archipelago. Earl describes how shallow seas connect islands on the west (Sumatra, Java, etc.) with the Asian continent and with similar wildlife, and islands on the east such as New Guinea are connected to Australia and are characterized by the presence of marsupials.

These early investigations assisted Alfred Russel Wallace in developing his theories about the biogeography which he states in his 1859 paper after extensively traveling the region. He proposes a line to the east of Bali since "all the islands eastward of Borneo and Java formed part of an Australian or Pacific continent, from which they were separated."

The proposal of the line, however, was not the main objective of Wallace's endeavours: his primary purpose was in fact to understand the geological phenomena and the colonization events that caused the boundaries in faunal distribution in the region through the development of his theories of evolution and biogeography. Wallace's studies in Indonesia demonstrate the emerging theory of evolution, at about the same time as J. D. Hooker and Asa Gray published essays also supporting Darwin's hypothesis. On the other hand, the lack of knowledge of tectonic plates and the uncertainty about biodiversity in the Philippines left Wallace with some contradicting points he had to deal with concerning his theory on biogeography.

In fact, Wallace did not include the Philippines in his 1859 paper, and the determination of a line in honor of his name was suggested by T. H. Huxley in 1868. Huxley studied the distribution of gallinaceous birds in the archipelago and noticed that species in the Philippines were remarkably distinct from those in the Asiatic realm. Based on that, he redrew Wallace's boundary placing it to the west of the Philippines and named it "Wallace's Line", even though Wallace did not include the Philippines on the east side of the line. Because of the complexity of the geographical landscape and the differences in diversity of organisms around the archipelago, continuous attempts to characterize faunal and botanical boundaries were carried out after Wallace. Some of them are:

- Sclater line (1894)
- Lydekker's line (1896)
- Pelseneer's faunal balance (1904), also known as the Weber line
- Mayr's faunal balance (1944)

In addition, several smaller transition sub-regional boundaries were also proposed. More recent work assessing biodiversity assemblages, phylogeny, and using computer-based geospatial tools to analyze previous boundaries have led to patterns of division similar to those proposed through the 19th century, although some special cases not explained before are reinforced by these modern analyses. Evaluation of the distribution of land mammals, birds, and amphibians in Wallace's realms concludes that the boundaries suggested by Wallace remain valid. Ali et al. (2020) study the fauna of Christmas Island and indicate that most of the ancestral colonizers of the island's land mammals and amphibians disappeared from the Lombok Strait. Therefore, they propose a re-conformation of Wallace's Line so that Christmas Island would be sited on the Australasian side of the biogeographical divide, instead of the oriental side.

== Biogeography ==
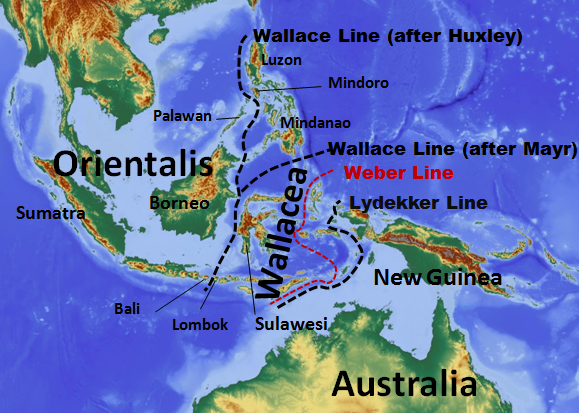
The Wallacea region situated between the Wallace's Line (after Ernst Mayr or Thomas Henry Huxley) and the Lydekker Line.

Understanding of the biogeography of the region centers on the relationship of ancient sea levels to the continental shelves. Wallace's Line is visible geographically when the continental shelf contours are examined. It figures as a deep-water channel that separates the southeastern edge of the Sunda Shelf from the Sahul Shelf. The Sunda Shelf links Borneo, Bali, Java, and Sumatra underwater to the mainland of southeastern Asia, while the Sahul Shelf connects Australia to New Guinea and their adjacent islands.

During the Pleistocene, when the ocean levels were up to 120 metres (390 ft) lower, islands became connected but never united Asia with Australia. Consequently, for over 50 million years, deep water between those two large continental shelf areas created a barrier that kept the flora and fauna of Australia separated from those of Asia. It can reasonably be concluded it was an ocean barrier preventing species migration because the physical aspects of the separated islands are very similar. Thus, the Wallacea region consists of islands that remained isolated on their respective continental land masses, with only those organisms capable of crossing the straits between islands populating them.

Alternatively, "Weber's line" runs through this transitional area (to the east of center), at the tipping point between Asian species against those with Australian origins.

== Zoogeography ==
The distributions of many bird species follow the limits of the line, since many birds do not cross even the shortest stretches of open ocean water. Among mammals, bats have distributions that can cross the line, but larger terrestrial mammals are generally limited to one side or the other. On the Australian side, many species of marsupials are present and some monotremes, alongside native rodents—although the occurrence of rodents in this case is derived from more recent colonization events. By contrast, to the Asian side, marsupials are excluded, and placental mammals such as apes, cats, elephants, monkeys, rhinoceroses, and other species are found. Exceptions to this include macaques, pigs, and tarsiers on Sulawesi.

Other groups of plants and animals show differing patterns, but the overall pattern is striking and reasonably consistent. Flora do not follow the Wallace Line to the same extent as fauna, since their colonization events differ in their ability to spread across bodies of water. One genus of plants that does not cross the line is the Australasian genus Eucalyptus, except for one species, E. deglupta, which naturally occurs on Sulawesi and Mindanao.

== See also ==
- Australasian realm – One of Earth's eight biogeographic realms
- Geography of Indonesia

== Sources ==
- Wallace, A.R. (1862–1863). "On the physical geography of the Malay archipelago". Proceedings of the Royal Geographical Society of London. 7 (5): 205–212. doi:10.2307/1799061. ISSN 1478-615X. JSTOR 179906.
- Wallace, A.R. (1863). "On the physical geography of the Malay archipelago". Journal of the Royal Geographical Society of London. 33: 217–234. doi:10.2307/1798448. ISSN 0266-6235. JSTOR 1798448 – via Internet Archive (archive.org).
