= Wallacea =

Biogeographical region

Wallacea is the group of islands within the red area. The Weber Line in blue has been used to separate Wallacea into a western part pertaining to Asia and an eastern part pertaining to Oceania.

The Sunda and Sahul shelves. Wallacea is the area in between.

Wallacea /wɒˈleɪsiə/ is a biogeographical designation for a group of mainly Indonesian islands separated by deep-water straits from the Asian and Australian continental shelves. Wallacea includes Sulawesi, the largest island in the group, as well as Lombok, Sumbawa, Flores, Sumba, and Timor. The islands of Wallacea lie between the Sunda Shelf (the Malay Peninsula, Sumatra, Borneo, and Java) to the west, and the Sahul Shelf, including Australia, New Guinea, and Maluku Islands to the south and east. The total land area of Wallacea is 347,000 km^{2} (134,000 sq mi).

== Geography ==
Wallacea is defined as the series of islands stretching between the two continental shelves of Sunda and Sahul, but excluding the Philippines. Its eastern border (separating Wallacea from Sahul) is represented by a zoogeographical boundary known as the Lydekker Line, while the Wallace Line (separating Wallacea (Bali and Sulawesi) from Sunda (Borneo and Java)) defines its western border.

The Weber Line is the midpoint, at which Asian and Australian fauna and flora are approximately equally represented. It follows the deepest straits traversing the Indonesian Archipelago.

The Wallace Line is named after the Welsh naturalist Alfred Russel Wallace, who recorded the differences between mammal and bird fauna between the islands on either side of the line. The islands of Sundaland to the west of the line, including Sumatra, Java, and Borneo, share a mammal fauna similar to that of East Asia, which includes tigers, rhinoceros, and apes; whereas the mammal fauna of Lombok and areas extending eastwards are mostly populated by marsupials and birds similar to those in Australasia. Sulawesi shows signs of both.

During the ice ages, sea levels were lower, exposing the Sunda shelf that links the islands of Sundaland to one another and to Asia and allowing Asian land animals to inhabit these islands.

The islands of Wallacea have few land mammals, land birds, or freshwater fish of continental origin, which find it difficult to cross open ocean. Many species of birds, reptiles, and insects were better able to cross the straits, and many such species of Australian and Asian origin are found there. Wallacea's plants are predominantly of Asian origin, and botanists include Sundaland, Wallacea, and Moluucca-New Guinea-Australia as the floristic province of Malesia.

Similarly, Australia and New Guinea to the east are linked by a shallow continental shelf, and were linked by a land bridge during the ice ages, forming a single continent that scientists variously call Australia-New Guinea, Meganesia, Papualand, or Sahul. Consequently, Australia, New Guinea, and the Aru Islands share many marsupial mammals, land birds, and freshwater fish that are not found in Wallacea.

== Biota and conservation issues ==
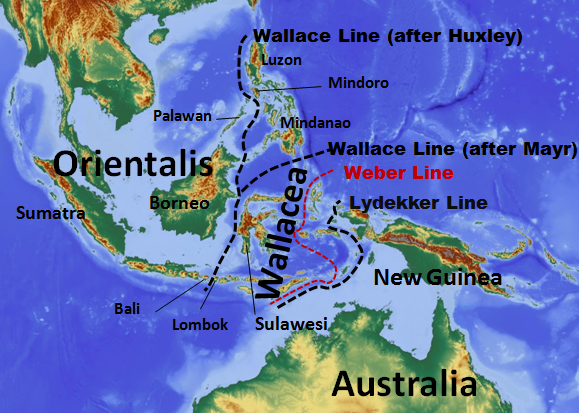
A map of Wallacea, bordered by the Wallace and Lydekker lines.

Although the distant ancestors of Wallacea's flora and fauna may have been from Asia or Australia-New Guinea, Wallacea is home to many endemic species. There is extensive autochthonous speciation and proportionately large numbers of endemics; the area is an important contributor to the overall mega-biodiversity of the Indonesian Archipelago.

Fauna includes the lowland and mountain anoa, or dwarf buffalo (Bubalus sp.), and the babirusa, or "deer-pig" (Babyrousa sp.), both found on Sulawesi, among other islands. Maluku shares a number of similar species with Sulawesi, albeit with fewer total, given the differences in size between the two islands—Sulawesi has at least 4,000 recorded terrestrial plant and animal species, while Maluku has just over 1,000, by comparison. Sulawesi is home to over 2,000 invertebrate species (with over 1,000 known species of arthropod, not including nearly 900 lepidopterans), 100 species of reptiles and amphibians, and 288 bird species. Maluku has around 70 reptile and amphibian, 250 avian, and over 550 invertebrate species. Seram Island is particularly noted for its butterflies and birds, including the Moluccan king parrot. Smaller mammals, including some carnivorans (such as civets), marsupials (such as the cuscus), primates and rodents are common throughout the region.

A large portion of the waters surrounding Wallacea are part of the Coral Triangle, considered to be the richest coral reef and marine ecosystems on earth, with the highest number of species, adding to the total biodiversity of the region.

Wallacea was originally almost completely forested, mostly tropical moist broadleaf forests, with some areas of tropical dry broadleaf forest. The higher mountains are home to montane and subalpine forests, and mangroves are common in coastal areas. According to Conservation International, Wallacea is home to over 10,000 plant species, of which approximately 1,500 (15%) are endemic.

Endemism is higher among terrestrial vertebrate species; out of 1,142 species described there, almost half (529) were endemic. 45% of the region retains some sort of forest cover, though only 52,017 km^{2} (15%) is in a pristine state. Of Wallacea's total 347,000 km^{2}-area, about 20,000 km^{2} are protected.

== Ecoregions ==
Tropical and subtropical moist broadleaf forests:

- Sulawesi lowland rain forests (Sulawesi, Banggai Islands, Sangihe Islands, Talaud Islands)
- Sulawesi montane rain forests (Sulawesi)

Tropical and subtropical dry broadleaf forests:

- Lesser Sundas deciduous forests (Lombok, Sumbawa, Komodo, Flores, Alor, Bali)
- Sumba deciduous forests (Sumba)
- Timor deciduous forests (Timor)

== Distribution between Asia and Australia ==
Australia may be isolated by sea, but technically through Wallacea, it can be zoologically extended. Australian Early-Middle Pliocene rodent fossils have been found in Chinchilla Sands and Bluffs Down in Queensland, but a mix of ancestral and derived traits suggest murid rodents made it to Australia earlier, maybe in the Miocene, over a forested archipelago, i.e. Wallacea, and evolved in Australia in isolation.

Australia's rodents make up much of the continent's placental mammal fauna and include various species from stick-nest rats to hopping mice. Other mammals invaded from the east. Two species of cuscus, the Sulawesi bear cuscus and the Sulawesi dwarf cuscus, are the westernmost representatives of the Australasian marsupials.

The tectonic uplift of Wallacea during the collision between Australia and Asia c. 23 million years ago allowed the global dispersal of passerine birds from Australia across the Indonesian islands. Bustards and megapodes must have somehow colonized Australia. Cockatiels similar to those from Australia inhabit Komodo Island in Wallacea.

A few species of Eucalyptus, a predominant genus of trees in Australia, are found in Wallacea: Eucalyptus deglupta on Sulawesi, and E. urophylla and E. alba in East Nusa Tenggara. For land snails Wallacea and Wallace's Line do not form a barrier for dispersal.
