= Kangean Islands =

Group of islands in Indonesia

Native name: Kepulauan Kangean; Kapoloan Kangayan; Kapuloang Kangayang
- Interactive map of Kangean Archipelago
- Interactive map of Kangean Islands

Geography
- Location: Lesser Sunda Islands
- Archipelago: Kangean Archipelago
- Area: 652.53 km^{2} (251.94 sq mi)

Administration
- Indonesia
- Province: East Java
- Regency: Sumenep Regency

Demographics
- Population: 166,226 (2025)
- Pop. density: 254.74/km^{2} (659.77/sq mi)
- Languages: Indonesian (official); Kangean (co-official)
- Ethnic groups: Kangeanese; Chindo; Bugis; Mangkasara’; Bajo; Mandarese; Madurese; Javanese; Abindo

Additional information
- Time zone: Western Indonesia Time (UTC+7)
- Motto: Habigi Kabecekan Nokolagen Manyak Kamaslahatan (Kangean) "One Kindness Attracts More Benefit"

The Kangean Islands, also known as the Kangean Archipelago (Kangean: Kapoloan Kangayan) are the group of islands within the Lesser Sunda Islands complex of the Indonesian Archipelago located in the northern Bali Sea. It comprises a total of 118 islands (27 inhabited islands) covering a land area of 652.54 km^{2}, with Kangean Island as the main and biggest island in the region. It is administered as a part of Sumenep Regency in the province of East Java.

== Terminology ==
The name of "Kangean" is etymologically derived from the "kangayan" term in Kangeanese, which refers to the sociocultural community of "scion" (a descendant of notable family). Another theory has suggested that "kangayan" could possibly mean "breed" due to historical inter-marriage between the indigenous people of the Kangean Archipelago and those of Sulawesi (mainly Bugis and Mangkasara’). This could also refer to the Bekisar, a well-known chicken breed originating from Kangean island which was bred initially by the Kangean people. The word kangayan could possibly relate to the hypothetical reconstructed proto-Austronesian word of *aŋay, which means "departure", "rendezvous", etc.

In Kangeanese literature, the word "kangayan" was used throughout the Middle Ages to describe the Kangean Islands in general, and it still continues to be used to describe the ancentral homeland region of the Kangean people in the central to eastern part of Kangean island, known as the Kangayan district.

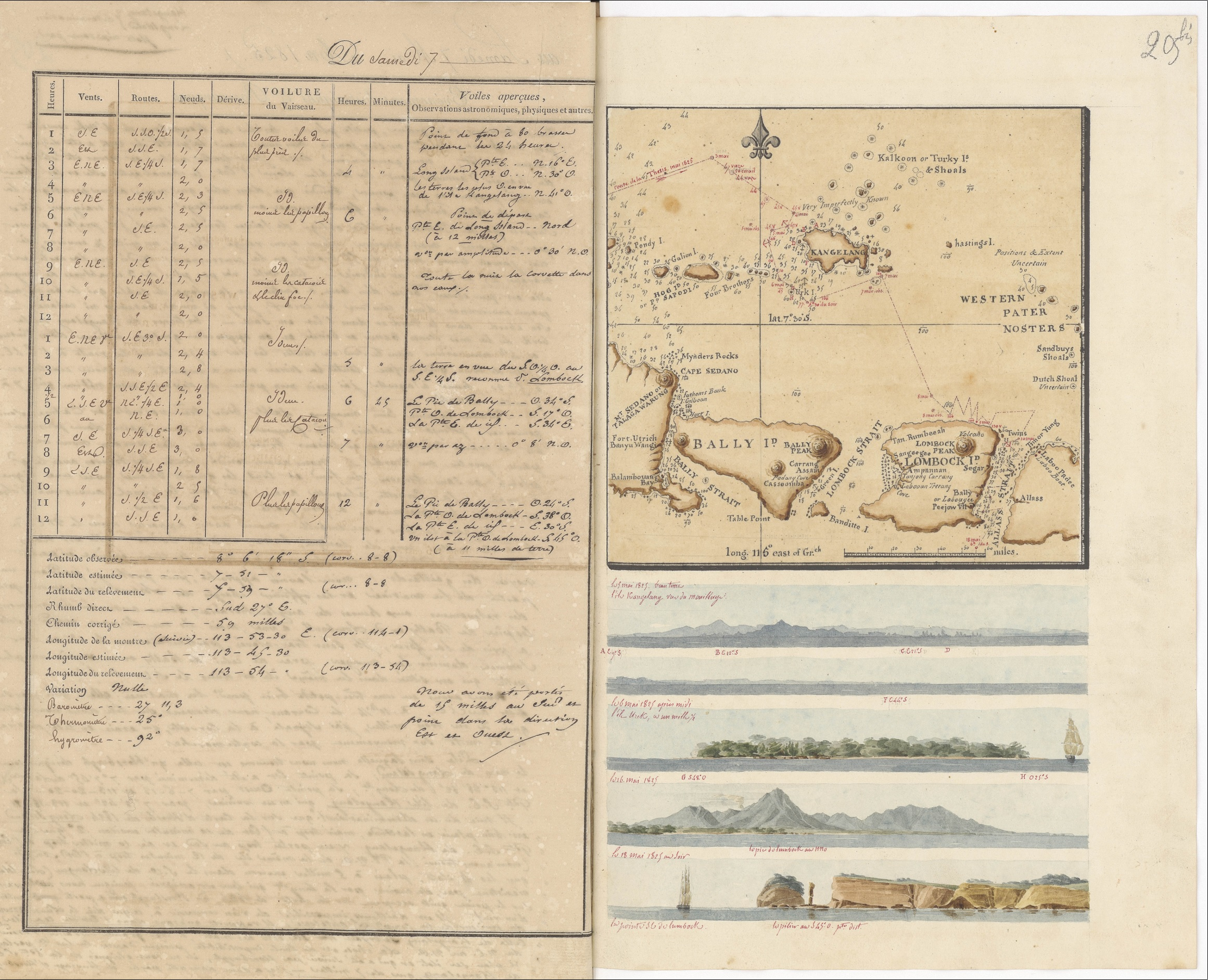
Kangean islands depicted map as Kangelang in the French journal or logbook of the Bougainville Expedition, c. 1820s

During the era of Dutch colonization of Indonesia, the islands of "Kangean" also were identified as Kangayang, Tangayang, or Kangeang.

== Layout ==
The largest island, at about 490 km², is Kangean Island. Other islands include Paliat, Sepanjang, and several smaller islands. The towns of Arjasa and Kalikatak, both on Kangean Island, are the area's largest population centres. The Kangean islands have strong historic and ethnic ties with Madura, Bali, West Nusa Tenggara, Sumbawa, South Borneo, and also South Sulawesi. The majority religion at Kangean is Islam.

The highest elevation point on the islands is in the northeast at 1,192 feet (364 m.), while overall the islands are low in elevation. The weather tends to rain regularly.

The Kangean tit-babbler, once considered a subspecies of gray-cheeked tit-babbler but now considered its own species, is endemic to forests on Kangean Island.

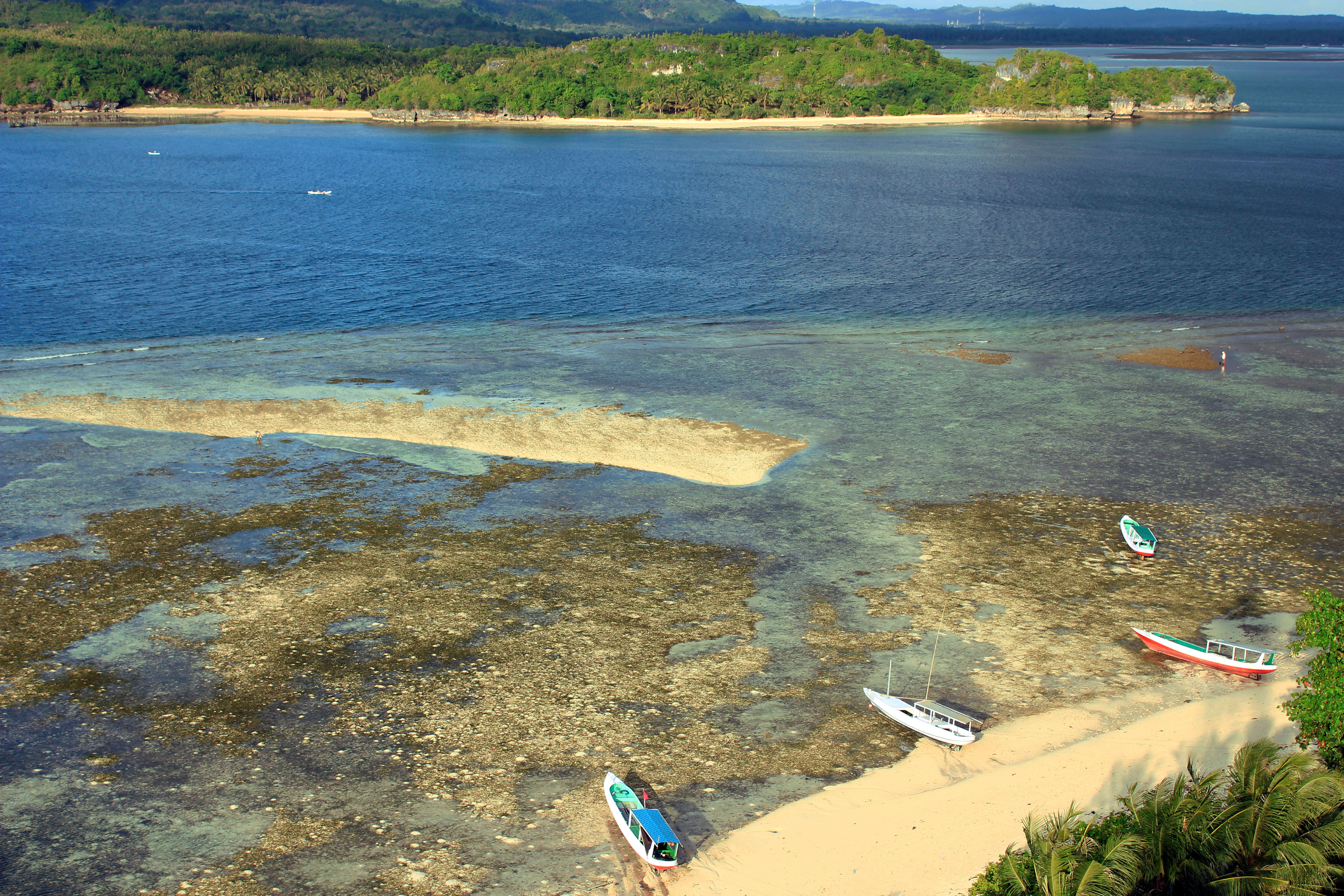
West coast of Kangean Island

Saltwater crocodiles are reported to be present within the island's coastal mangroves.

They are administered as three districts (kecamatan) of Sumenep Regency - Arjasa, Kangayan, and Sapêken - sub-divided into 37 villages (desa). Arjasa District forms the west part of the main island, with overhalf of the population of the archipelago. Kangayan District forms the east part of that island (plus some minor islands to the south including Pulat Saubi, Pulau Cungcung and Pulau Sabunten), and Sapêken District comprises a number of separate islands to the east and southeast of Kangean, of which Pulau Paliat and Pulau Sepanjang (or Pulau Sumurbungkar) are the largest. Together, their population was 108,264 in the 2000 census, increasing to 123,367 in the 2010 count and to 161,056 at the 2020 Census; the estimated population as at mid 2025 was 166,226.

== Ethnic group ==
The Kangeanese (Kangeanese: Oréng Kangéan, Indonesian: Orang Kangean or Suku Kangean) are an Austronesian ethnic group indigenous to the Indonesian island of Kangean and its surrounding islands. The Kangeanese population live mostly on the Kangean Islands, making up c.90% of the island group's population of 161,056 in 2020.

== Languages ==
The Kangean language is mainly spoken throughout the Kangean Islands.

== Exports and reserves ==
Since 1993 the islands have been the site of substantial natural gas mining. The natural gas fields were first discovered and developed by the United States corporation ARCO, which became a subsidiary of BP in 2000. In mid-2004, BP sold its Kangean holdings to an Indonesian corporation, PT Energi Mega Persada. The islands are connected to East Java via a 430 km pipeline, most of which runs underwater.

Other economic activities on the islands include teak, coconut, and salt production.

== Airstrip ==
In 2014, the local government agreed to reactivate an old airstrip in the western (Arjasa) part of Kangean Island. The airstrip is 1,000 metres long and 30 metres wide.
