= Sundaland =

Biogeographic region of Southeast Asia

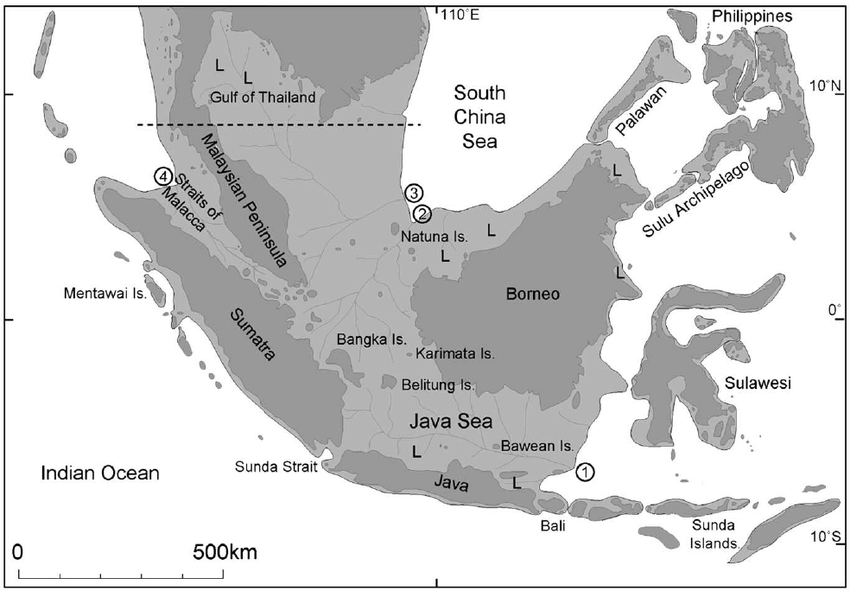
Sundaland during the Last Glacial Maximum

Sundaland (also called Sundaica or the Sundaic region) is a biogeographical region of Southeast Asia corresponding to a larger landmass that was exposed throughout the last 2.6 million years during periods when sea levels were lower. It includes Bali, Borneo, Java, and Sumatra in Indonesia, and their surrounding small islands, as well as the Malay Peninsula on Mainland Southeast Asia.

== Extent ==
The area of Sundaland encompasses the Sunda Shelf, a tectonically stable extension of Southeast Asia's continental shelf that was exposed during glacial periods of the last 2 million years. It is also roughly coterminous with the Sunda plate.

The extent of the Sunda Shelf is approximately equal to the 120-meter isobath. In addition to the Malay Peninsula and the islands of Borneo, Java, and Sumatra, it includes the Java Sea, the Gulf of Thailand, and portions of the South China Sea. In total, the area of Sundaland is approximately 1,800,000 km^{2}. The area of exposed land in Sundaland has fluctuated considerably during the past recent 2 million years; the modern land area is approximately half of its maximum extent.

The western and southern borders of Sundaland are clearly marked by the deeper waters of the Sunda Trench – some of the deepest in the world – and the Indian Ocean. The eastern boundary of Sundaland is the Wallace Line, identified by Alfred Russel Wallace as the eastern boundary of the range of Asia's land mammal fauna, and thus the boundary of the Indomalayan and Australasian realms. The islands east of the Wallace line are known as Wallacea, a separate biogeographical region that is considered part of Australasia. The Wallace Line corresponds to a deep-water channel that has never been crossed by any land bridges. The northern border of Sundaland is more difficult to define in bathymetric terms; a phytogeographic transition at approximately 9ºN is considered to be the northern boundary.

Greater portions of Sundaland were most recently exposed during the last glacial period from approximately 110,000 to 12,000 years ago. When the sea level was decreased by 30–40 meters or more, land bridges connected the islands of Borneo, Java, and Sumatra to the Malay Peninsula and mainland Asia. Because the sea level was 30 meters or more lower throughout much of the last 800,000 years, the current status of Borneo, Java, and Sumatra as islands has been a relatively rare occurrence throughout the Pleistocene. In contrast, the sea level was higher during the late Pliocene, and the exposed area of Sundaland was smaller than what is observed at present. Sundaland was partially submerged starting around 18,000 years ago and continuing until about 5000 BC. During the Last Glacial Maximum the sea level fell by approximately 120 meters, and the entire Sunda Shelf was exposed.

== Modern climate ==
The Sahul Shelf and the Sunda Shelf today. The area in between is called "Wallacea"

All of Sundaland is within the tropics; the equator runs through central Sumatra and Borneo. Like elsewhere in the tropics, rainfall, rather than temperature, is the major determinant of regional variation. Most of Sundaland is classified as perhumid, or everwet, with over 2,000 millimeters of rain annually; rainfall exceeds evapotranspiration throughout the year and there are no predictable dry seasons like elsewhere in Southeast Asia.

The warm and shallow seas of the Sunda Shelf (averaging 28 °C or more) are part of the Indo-Pacific Warm Pool/Western Pacific Warm Pool and an important driver of the Hadley circulation and the El Niño-Southern Oscillation (ENSO), particularly in January when it is a major heat source to the atmosphere. ENSO also has a major influence on the climate of Sundaland; strong positive ENSO events result in droughts throughout Sundaland and tropical Asia.

== Modern ecology ==
The high rainfall supports closed canopy evergreen forests throughout the islands of Sundaland, transitioning to deciduous forest and savanna woodland with increasing latitude. The remaining primary (unlogged) lowland forest is known for giant dipterocarp trees and orangutans; after logging, forest structure and community composition change to be dominated by shade intolerant trees and shrubs. Dipterocarps are notable for mast fruiting events, where tree fruiting is synchronized at unpredictable intervals resulting in predator satiation. Higher elevation forests are shorter and dominated by trees in the oak family. Botanists often include Sundaland, the adjacent Philippines, Wallacea and New Guinea in a single floristic province of Malesia, based on similarities in their flora, which is predominantly of Asian origin.

Research on the biogeographic patterns of squirrels highlights Sundaland (particularly Borneo and Sumatra) as a critical biodiversity hotspot, characterized by pronounced phylogenetic clustering and a high concentration of endemic specialist species that originated during the Miocene.

During the last glacial period, sea levels were lower and all of Sundaland was an extension of the Asian continent. As a result, the modern islands of Sundaland are home to many Asian mammals including elephants, monkeys, apes, tigers, tapirs, and rhinoceros. The flooding of Sundaland separated species that had once shared the same environment. One example is the river threadfin (Polydactylus macrophthalmus, Bleeker 1858), which once thrived in a river system now called "North Sunda River" or "Molengraaff river". The fish is now found in the Kapuas River on the island of Borneo, and in the Musi and Batanghari rivers in Sumatra. Selective pressure (in some cases resulting in extinction) has operated differently on each of the islands of Sundaland, and as a consequence, a different assemblage of mammals is found on each island. However, the current species assemblage on each island is not simply a subset of a universal Sundaland or Asian fauna, as the species that inhabited Sundaland before flooding did not all have ranges encompassing the entire Sunda Shelf. Island area and number of terrestrial mammal species are related, with the largest islands of Sundaland (Borneo and Sumatra) having the highest diversity.

=== Ecoregions ===
Tropical and subtropical moist broadleaf forests

- Eastern Java–Bali rain forests (Java, Bali)
- Eastern Java–Bali montane rain forests (Java, Bali).
- Western Java montane rain forests (Java)
- Western Java rain forests (Java)
- Borneo lowland rain forests (Borneo)
- Borneo montane rain forests (Borneo)
- Borneo peat swamp forests (Borneo)
- Mentawai Islands rain forests (Mentawai Islands)
- Peninsular Malaysian montane rain forests (Malay Peninsula)
- Peninsular Malaysian peat swamp forests (Malay Peninsula)
- Peninsular Malaysian rain forests (Anambas Islands, Malay Peninsula)
- Southwest Borneo freshwater swamp forests (Borneo)
- Sumatran freshwater swamp forests (Sumatra)
- Sumatran lowland rain forests (Sumatra, Nias, Bangka Island)
- Sumatran montane rain forests (Sumatra)
- Sumatran peat swamp forests (Sumatra)
- Sundaland heath forests (Indonesia)

Tropical and subtropical coniferous forests

- Sumatran tropical pine forests (Sumatra)

Montane grasslands and shrublands

- Kinabalu montane alpine meadows (Borneo)

Mangroves

- Sunda Shelf mangroves (Borneo, Sumatra, Riau Islands)

== History ==
=== Early research ===
The name "Sunda" goes back to antiquity, appearing in Ptolemy's Geography, written around 150 AD. In an 1852 publication, English navigator George Windsor Earl advanced the idea of a "Great Asiatic Bank", based in part on common features of mammals found in Java, Borneo and Sumatra.

Explorers and scientists began measuring and mapping the seas of Southeast Asia in the 1870s, primarily using depth sounding. In 1921 Gustaaf Molengraaff, a Dutch geologist, postulated that the nearly uniform sea depths of the shelf indicated an ancient peneplain that was the result of repeated flooding events as ice caps melted, with the peneplain becoming more perfect with each successive flooding event. Molengraaff also identified ancient, now submerged, drainage systems that drained the area during periods of lower sea levels.

The name "Sundaland" for the peninsular shelf was first proposed by Reinout Willem van Bemmelen in his Geography of Indonesia in 1949, based on his research during World War II. The ancient drainage systems described by Molengraaff were verified and mapped by Tjia in 1980 and described in greater detail by Emmel and Curray in 1982 complete with river deltas, floodplains and backswamps.

=== Data types ===
The climate and ecology of Sundaland throughout the Quaternary has been investigated by analyzing foraminiferal δ^{18}O and pollen from cores drilled into the ocean bed, δ^{18}O in speleothems from caves, and δ^{13}C and δ^{15}N in bat guano from caves, as well as species distribution models, phylogenetic analysis, and community structure and species richness analysis.

=== Climate ===
Perhumid climate has existed in Sundaland since the early Miocene; though there is evidence for several periods of drier conditions, a perhumid core persisted in Borneo. The presence of fossil coral reefs dating to the late Miocene and early Pliocene suggests that, as the Indian monsoon grew more intense, seasonality increased in some portions of Sundaland during these epochs. Palynological evidence from Sumatra suggests that temperatures were cooler during the late Pleistocene; mean annual temperatures at high elevation sites may have been as much as 5 °C cooler than present.

Most recent research agrees that Indo-Pacific sea surface temperatures were at most 2-3 °C lower during the Last Glacial Maximum. Snow was found much lower than at present (approximately 1,000 meters lower) and there is evidence that glaciers existed on Borneo and Sumatra around 10,000 years before present. However, debate continues on how precipitation regimes changed throughout the Quaternary. Some authors argue that rainfall decreased with the area of ocean available for evaporation as sea levels fell with ice sheet expansion. Others posit that changes in precipitation have been minimal and an increase in land area in the Sunda Shelf alone (due to lowered sea level) is not enough to decrease precipitation in the region.

One possible explanation for the lack of agreement on hydrologic change throughout the Quaternary is that there was significant heterogeneity in climate during the Last Glacial Maximum throughout Indonesia. Alternatively, the physical and chemical processes that underlie the method of inferring precipitation from δ^{18}O records may have operated differently in the past. Some authors working primarily with pollen records have also noted the difficulties of using vegetation records to detect changes in precipitation regimes in such a humid environment, as water is not a limiting factor in community assemblage.

=== Ecology ===
Sundaland, and in particular Borneo, has been an evolutionary hotspot for biodiversity since the early Miocene due to repeated immigration and vicariance events. The modern islands of Borneo, Java, and Sumatra have served as refugia for the flora and fauna of Sundaland during multiple glacial periods in the last million years, and are serving the same role at present.

==== Savanna corridor theory ====
Dipterocarp trees characteristic of modern Southeast Asian tropical rainforest have been present in Sundaland since before the Last Glacial Maximum. There is also evidence for savanna vegetation, particularly in now submerged areas of Sundaland, throughout the last glacial period. However, researchers disagree on the spatial extent of savanna that was present in Sundaland. There are two opposing theories about the vegetation of Sundaland, particularly during the last glacial period: (1) that there was a continuous savanna corridor connecting modern mainland Asia to the islands of Java and Borneo, and (2) that the vegetation of Sundaland was instead dominated by tropical rainforest, with only small, discontinuous patches of savanna vegetation.

The presence of a savanna corridor—even if fragmented—would have allowed for savanna-dwelling fauna (as well as early humans) to disperse between Sundaland and the Indochinese biogeographic region; emergence of a savanna corridor during glacial periods and subsequent disappearance during interglacial periods would have facilitated speciation through both vicariance (allopatric speciation) and geodispersal. Morley and Flenley (1987) and Heaney (1991) were the first to postulate the existence of a continuous corridor of savanna vegetation through the center of Sundaland (from the modern Malay Peninsula to Borneo) during the last glacial period, based on palynological evidence. Using the modern distribution of primates, termites, rodents, and other species, other researchers infer that the extent of tropical forest contracted—replaced by savanna and open forest —during the last glacial period. Vegetation models using data from climate simulations show varying degrees of forest contraction; Bird et al. (2005) noted that although no single model predicts a continuous savanna corridor through Sundaland, many do predict open vegetation between modern Java and southern Borneo. Combined with other evidence, they suggest that a 50–150 kilometer wide savanna corridor ran down the Malay Peninsula, through Sumatra and Java, and across to Borneo. Additionally, Wurster et al. (2010) analyzed stable carbon isotope composition in bat guano deposits in Sundaland and found strong evidence for the expansion of savanna in Sundaland. Similarly, stable isotope composition of fossil mammal teeth supports the existence of the savanna corridor.

In contrast, other authors argue that Sundaland was primarily covered by tropical rainforest. Using species distribution models, Raes et al. (2014) suggest that Dipterocarp rainforest persisted throughout the last glacial period. Others have observed that the submerged rivers of the Sunda Shelf have obvious, incised meanders, which would have been maintained by trees on river banks. Pollen records from sediment cores around Sundaland are contradictory; for example, cores from highland sites suggest that forest cover persisted throughout the last glacial period, but other cores from the region show pollen from savanna-woodland species increasing through glacial periods. And in contrast to previous findings, Wurster et al. (2017) again used stable carbon isotope analysis of bat guano, but found that at some sites rainforest cover was maintained through much of the last glacial period. Soil type, rather than long-term existence of a savanna corridor, has also been posited as an explanation for species distribution differences within Sundaland; Slik et al. (2011) suggest that the sandy soils of the now submerged seabed are a more likely dispersal barrier.

==== Paleofauna ====
Before Sundaland emerged during the late Pliocene and early Pleistocene (~2.4 million years ago), there were no mammals on Java. As sea level lowered, species such as the dwarf elephantoid Sinomastodon bumiajuensis colonized Sundaland from mainland Asia. Later fauna included tigers, Sumatran rhinoceros, and Indian elephant, which were found throughout Sundaland; smaller animals were also able to disperse across the region.

== Human migrations ==
According to the most widely accepted theory, the ancestors of the modern-day Austronesian populations of the Maritime Southeast Asia and adjacent regions are believed to have migrated southward, from the East Asia mainland to Taiwan, and then to the rest of Maritime Southeast Asia. An alternative theory points to the now-submerged Sundaland as the possible cradle of Austronesian languages: thus the "Out of Sundaland" theory. However, this view is an extreme minority view among professional archaeologists, linguists, and geneticists. The Out of Taiwan model (though not necessarily the Express Train Out of Taiwan model) is accepted by the vast majority of professional researchers.

A study from Leeds University and published in Molecular Biology and Evolution, examining mitochondrial DNA lineages, suggested that shared ancestry between Taiwan and Southeast Asian resulted from earlier migrations. Population dispersals seem to have occurred at the same time as sea levels rose, which may have resulted in migrations from the Philippine Islands to as far north as Taiwan within the last 10,000 years.

The population migrations were most likely to have been driven by climate change — the effects of the drowning of an ancient continent. Rising sea levels in three massive pulses may have caused flooding and the submerging of the Sunda continent, creating the Java and South China Seas and the thousands of islands that make up Indonesia and the Philippines today. The changing sea levels would have caused these humans to move away from their coastal homes and culture, and farther inland throughout southeast Asia. This forced migration would have caused these humans to adapt to the new forest and mountainous environments, developing farms and domestication, and becoming the predecessors to future human populations in these regions.

Stephen Oppenheimer locates the origin of the Austronesians in Sundaland and its upper regions. From the standpoint of historical linguistics, the home of the Austronesian languages is the main island of Taiwan, also known by its unofficial Portuguese name of Formosa; on this island the deepest divisions in Austronesian are found, among the families of the native Formosan languages.

Notable past (purple) and current (orange) land bridges on a bathymetric equirectangular projection centred on 45° E

== See also ==
- Banda Arc
- Father Tongue hypothesis
- Oceania
  - Australasia
    - Australia (continent)
- Oceanic trench
- Plate tectonics
- Sahul
- Sunda Arc
- Sundadonty, named after Sunda
- Sunda Islands
- Wallacea
