= Sumatran peat swamp forests =

Ecoregion in Indonesia

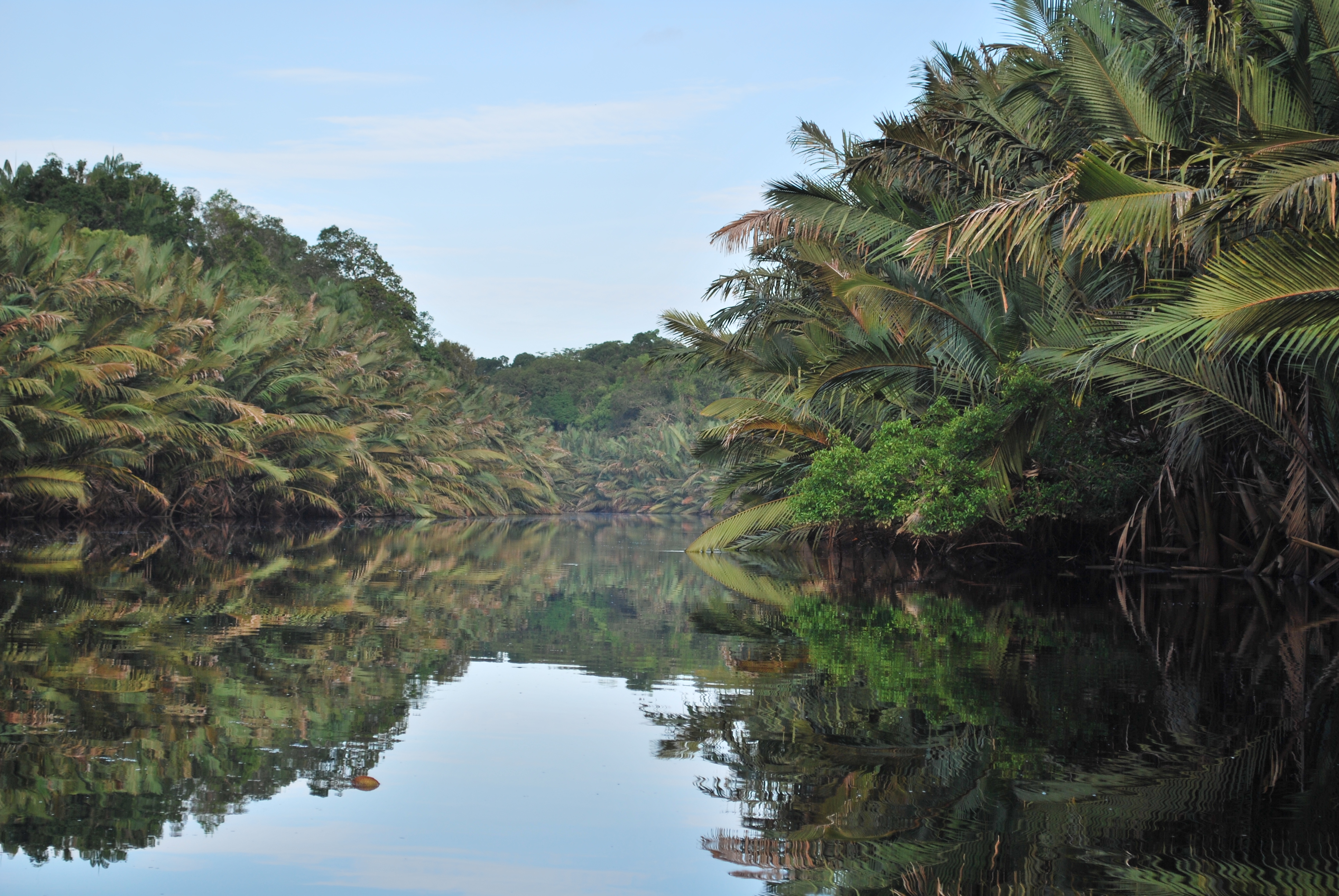
- Berbak National Park 2012

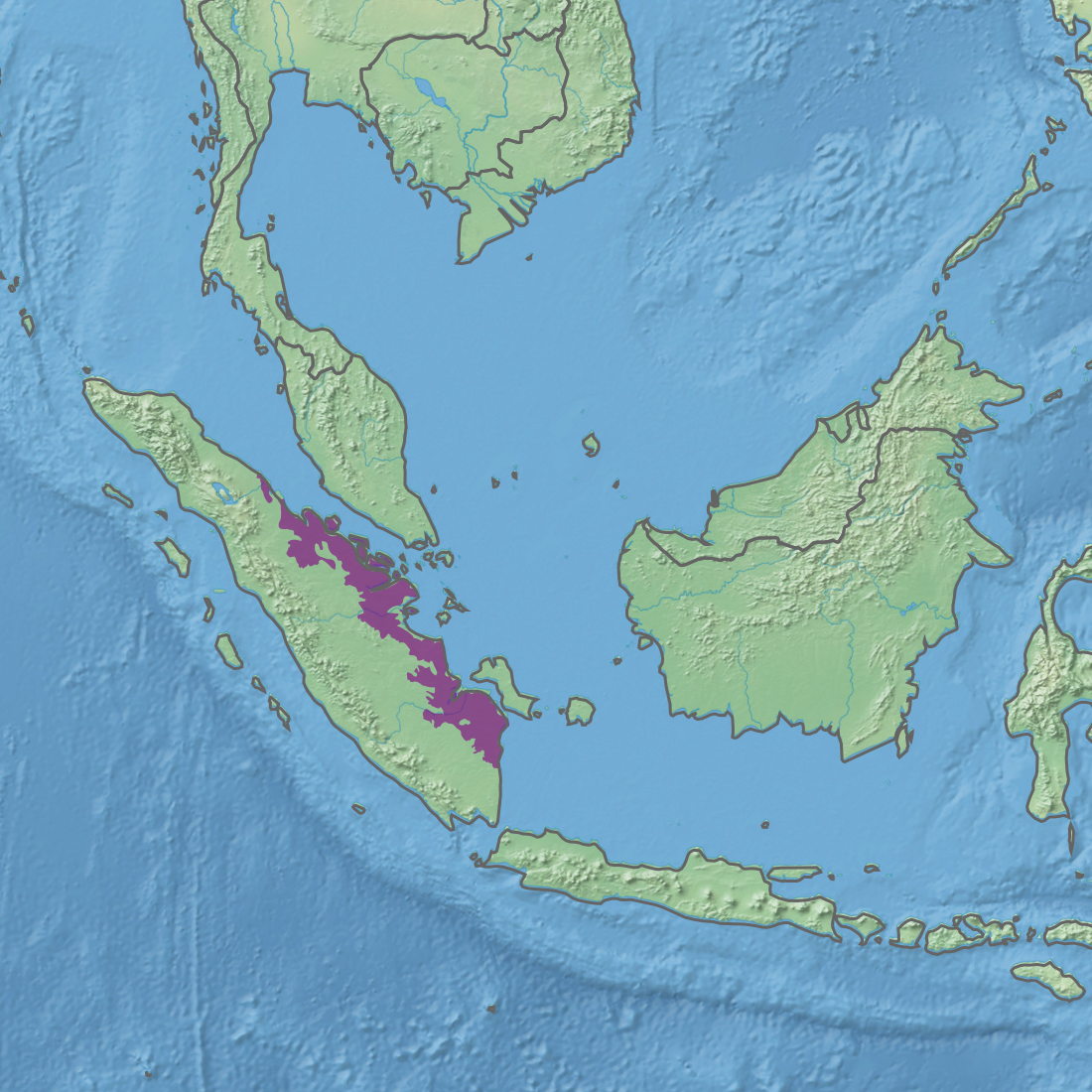
- Ecoregion territory (in purple)

Ecology
- Realm: Indomalayan
- Biome: Tropical and subtropical moist broadleaf forests
- Borders: Sumatran freshwater swamp forests; Sumatran lowland rain forests; Sunda Shelf mangroves

Geography
- Area: 87,706 km^{2} (33,863 mi^{2})
- Country: Indonesia
- Coordinates: 0.5°N 102.5°E

Conservation
- Conservation status: critical/endangered
- Protected: 7.67%

The Sumatran peat swamp forests ecoregion (WWF ID: IM0160) covers the low-lying peat swamp forests along the northeast coast of the island of Sumatra in Indonesia. As is typical for peat swamp forests, this ecoregion lies between a thin strip of saltwater-affected mangroves on the coast, and freshwater swamps and lowland rain forest on better drained soils further inland. Because the peat soil has relatively low nutrient levels, this ecoregion has been less used for agriculture, but burning and clearance has degraded half of the forest.

== Location and description ==
The ecoregion stretches for about 1,000 km down the south-eastern side of Sumatra, averaging 75 km wide, and separated from the sea by only a few kilometers of mangroves. It also covers the islands of Rupat, Bengkalis, Tebing Tinggi, Rangsang, and Mendol off the northeast coast of Sumatra. The peat swamps are ombrogenous (rain fed), and form where sediments have piled up behind the tangled brush of the mangroves.

== Climate ==
The climate of the ecoregion is Tropical rainforest climate (Köppen climate classification (Af)). This climate is characterized as hot, humid, and having at least 60 mm of precipitation every month.

== Flora and fauna ==
The soil in the ecoregion is typically over 65%, with the peat at least 50 cm thick. Biodiversity and endemism of plants is relatively low, due to the specialized conditions of the soil. Habitat type depends on the local levels of nutrients and acidity, with the edges of the swamps generally more nutrient rich than the interior. Characteristic trees of the region include Tristaniopsis obovata, Ploiarium elegans, Maasia glauca, Toona ciliata, Cocos nucifera, Nypa fruticans, and Stemonurus secundiflorus. Peat swamps tend to support fewer species of wildlife than richer habitat; there are no endemic mammals in this ecoregion, and relatively few species of birds. Land clearance for development, particularly in the south, is putting more pressure on the peat swamp forests.

== Protected areas ==
7.67% of the ecoregion is officially protected. These protected areas include:

- Berbak National Park
- Kerumutan Wildlife Reserve
- Sembilang National Park
