= Sembilang National Park =

National park in Indonesia

- IUCN category II (national park)
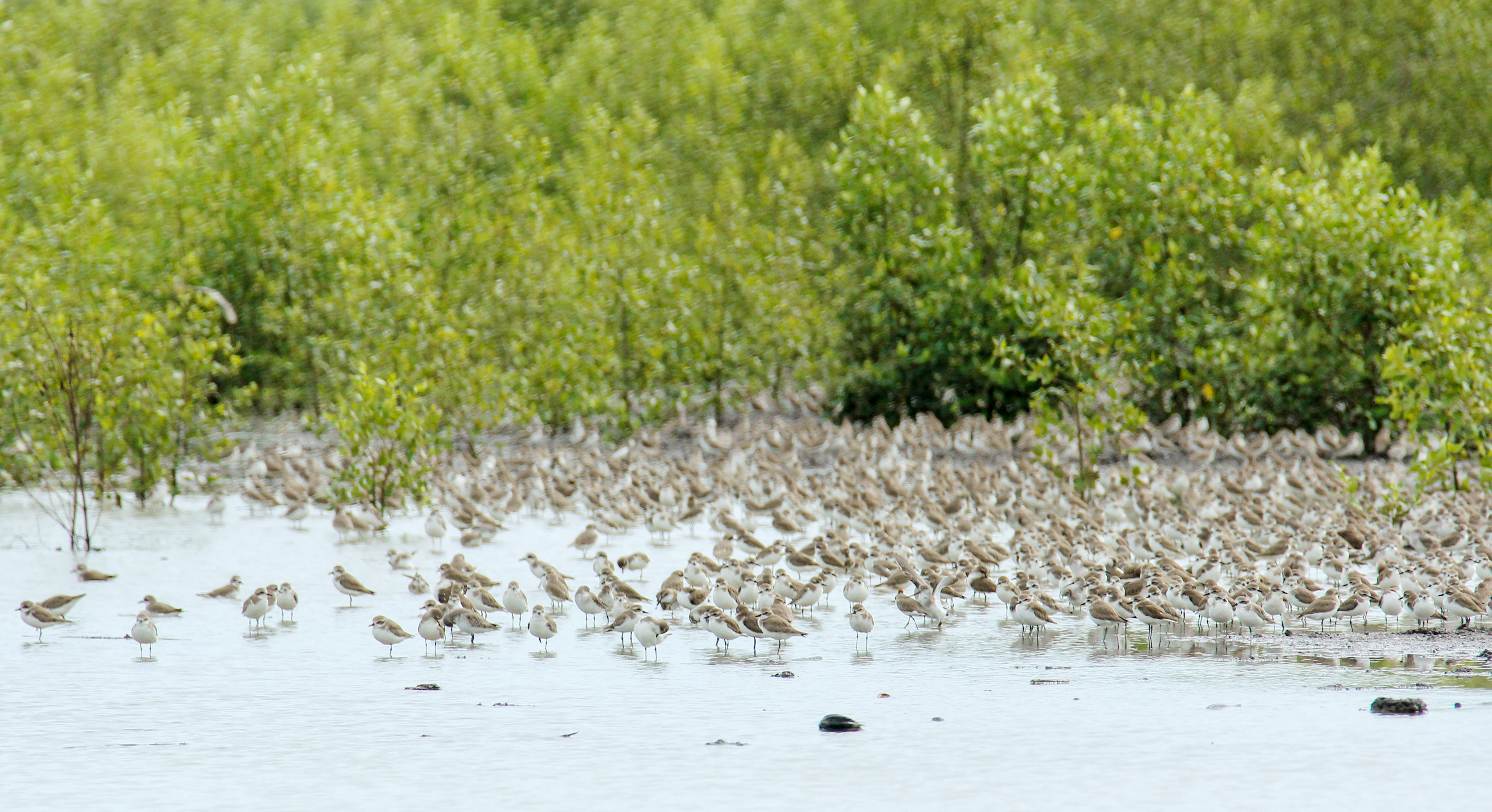

- Location within Sumatra Location within Indonesia
- Location: Sumatra, Indonesia
- Coordinates: 1°57′S 104°34′E
- Area: 2,051 km^{2} (792 sq mi)
- Established: 2001
- Governing body: Ministry of Forestry

Ramsar Wetland
- Designated: 3 June 2011
- Reference no.: 1945

Sembilang National Park is a national park covering 2,051 km^{2} along the east coast of Sumatra, Indonesia. The park is dominated by swamps as peat forests, like the neighbouring Berbak National Park, and both parks are Ramsar wetlands of international importance. The park is considered to have the most complex shorebird community in the world, with 213 species recorded, and supports the world's largest breeding colony of milky storks. From Palembang to the Sembilang National Park needs one hour drive plus one and a half hour by boat and then one hour overland.

== Flora and fauna ==
About half of the park is covered by mangrove forests, while the rest is covered by peat swamp forest, lowland tropical forests, mud flats, freshwater swamp forests and riparian forests.

The park provides habitat for 53 mammal species, including the endangered Sumatran tiger, Sumatran elephant, Malayan tapir, agile gibbon and siamang, as well as the vulnerable Sunda clouded leopard, marbled cat, flat-headed cat, sun bear and southern pig-tailed macaque. Reptiles include the saltwater crocodile and false gharial.

The rivers of the park are inhabited by over 140 species of fish and 38 species of crab, as well as the threatened Eurasian otter, smooth-coated otter, Malaysian giant turtle, Amboina box turtle, Asiatic softshell turtle, finless porpoise and Irrawaddy dolphin.

Within the park is the largest breeding colony of milky storks in the world, and one of the largest colonies of lesser adjutant. Other threatened birds in the park include the Storm's stork, white-winged duck, Nordmann's greenshank and Far Eastern curlew. The total bird population of the park has been estimated to be up to one million, while during winter up to 100,000 migratory birds stop over for rest.

== Conservation and threats ==
The national park has been declared in 2003. It is under threat from small scale illegal logging, 15 meters abrasion a year and coastal fish ponds activities. Mangrove restoration has been implemented for 200 hectares and still been added.

Together with the neighboring Berbak National Park in the province of Jambi, Sembilang is acknowledged as a part of UNESCO World Network of Biosphere Reserves in 2018.

On January 15, 2020, the Jakarta Post announced that an uninhabited island in the park, Betet Island is now submerged at 1 meter below sea level as a result of climate change. Betet Island was formerly home to an endangered Sumatran tiger.
