= Dyera polyphylla =

Conservation status
- Vulnerable (IUCN 2.3)

Scientific classification
- Kingdom: Plantae
- Clade: Embryophytes
- Clade: Tracheophytes
- Clade: Spermatophytes
- Clade: Angiosperms
- Clade: Eudicots
- Clade: Asterids
- Order: Gentianales
- Family: Apocynaceae
- Genus: Dyera
- Species: D. polyphylla

Binomial name
- Dyera polyphylla (Miq.) Steenis

Synonyms
- Alstonia polyphylla Miq.; Dyera borneensis Baill.; Dyera lowii Hook.f.

Species of tropical tree

Dyera polyphylla is a tree species in the family Apocynaceae native to Sumatra and Borneo. It grows to 60 m tall in freshwater swamp forest, peat swamp forest, and kerangas on groundwater podzols.
