= Jelutong (disambiguation) =

Jelutong, Penang, is a suburb of Georgetown, Penang, Malaysia.

Jelutong may also refer to:

- Jelutong (federal constituency), Penang, represented in the Dewan Rakyat
- Jelutong (tree), a species of tropical tree (Dyera costulata)

== See also ==
- Bukit Jelutong, a suburb in Selangor, Malaysia
