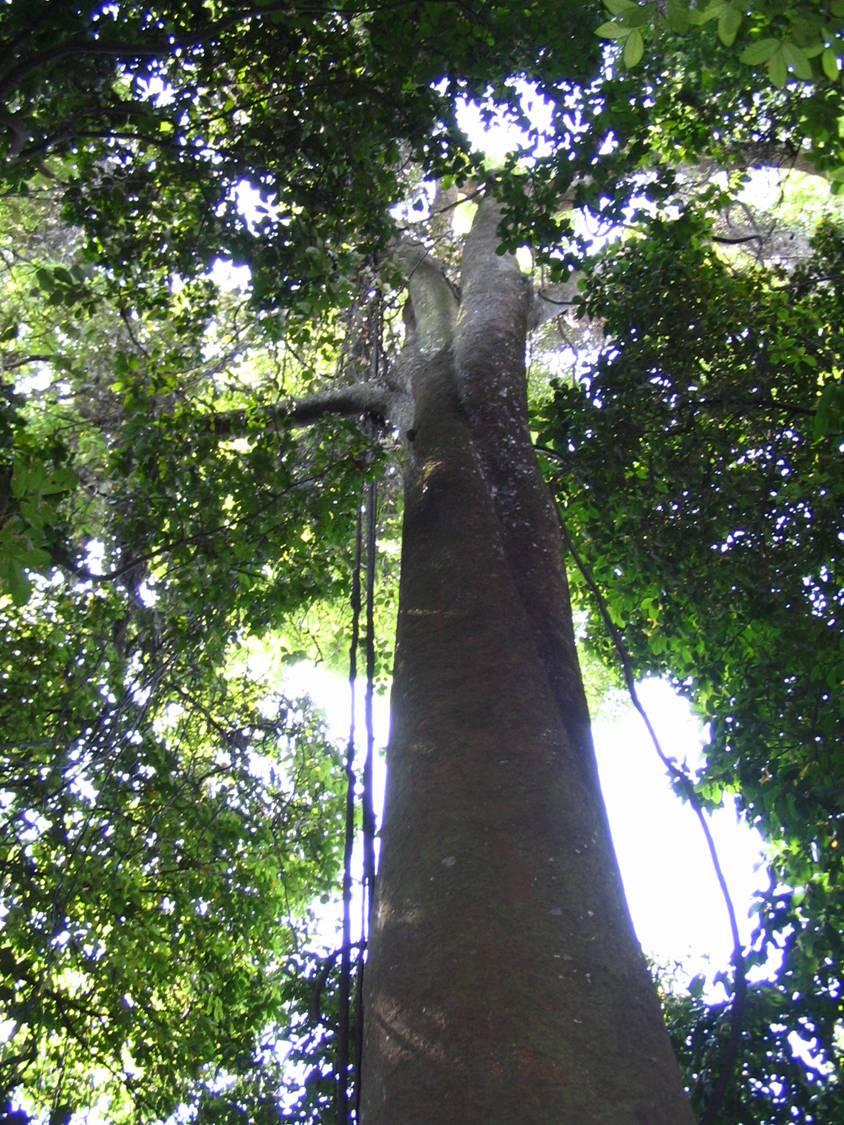

Conservation status
- Least Concern (IUCN 2.3)

Scientific classification
- Kingdom: Plantae
- Clade: Embryophytes
- Clade: Tracheophytes
- Clade: Angiosperms
- Clade: Eudicots
- Clade: Asterids
- Order: Gentianales
- Family: Apocynaceae
- Genus: Dyera
- Species: D. costulata

Binomial name
- Dyera costulata (Miq.) Hook.f

Synonyms
- Alstonia costulata Miq.; Alstonia eximia Miq.; Alstonia grandifolia Miq.; Dyera laxiflora Hook.f.

= Dyera costulata =

Species of tree

Dyera costulata, the jelutong, is a species of tree in the family Apocynaceae. It grows to approximately 60 metres (200 ft) tall with diameters of 2 metres (5 to 6 ft), or even to 80 m (260 ft) tall with diameters to 3 m (10 ft), and boles clear and straight for 30 m (90 ft). It grows in Malaysia, Borneo, Sumatra and southern Thailand. Its natural distribution is scattered locales in low-elevation tropical evergreen forest.

In addition, jelutong can be tapped for latex and from the 1920s through the 1960s, jelutong latex was an important source of chewing gum.

Jelutong has been traditionally overharvested, and is a threatened species in many areas. It is a protected species in parts of Malaysia and Thailand. The tree is grown commercially for timber.

Sawdust from this species has been known to cause allergic dermatitis.

== Uses ==
Jelutong is used for its wood. Along with balsa it is technically a hardwood with many properties similar to that wood. These properties such as the low density, straight grain and fine texture mean it is easy to work with and hence popular with model makers and within the patternmaking trade. The roots are used as a cork substitute.
