= Sumatran freshwater swamp forests =

Ecoregion in Sumatra, Indonesia

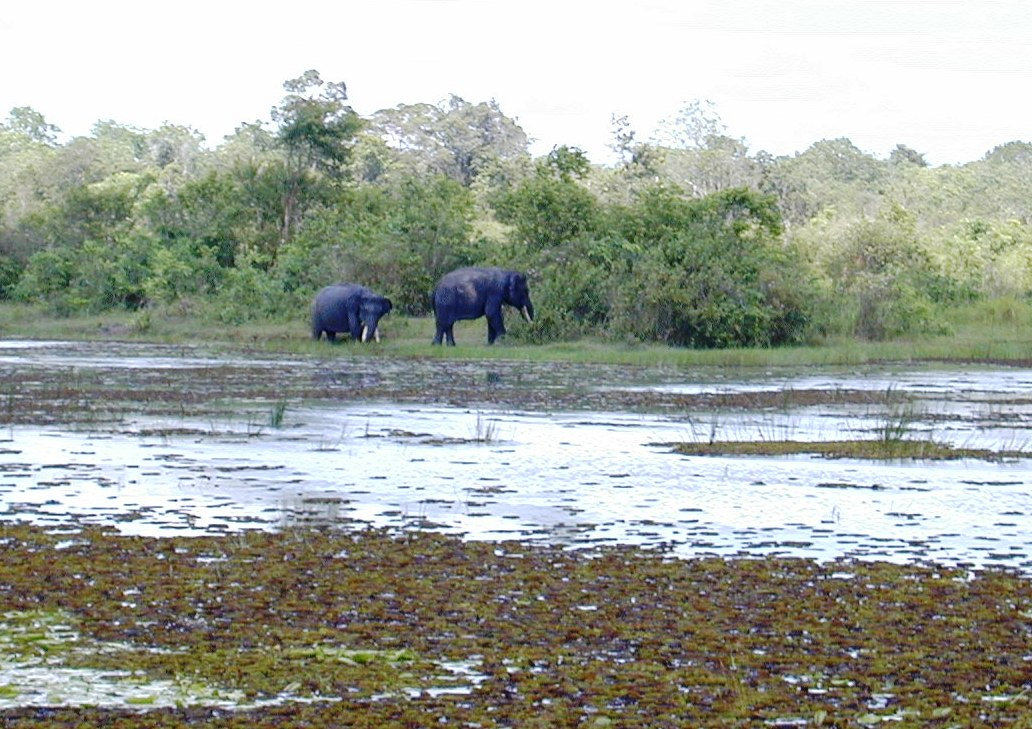
- Way Kambas National Park

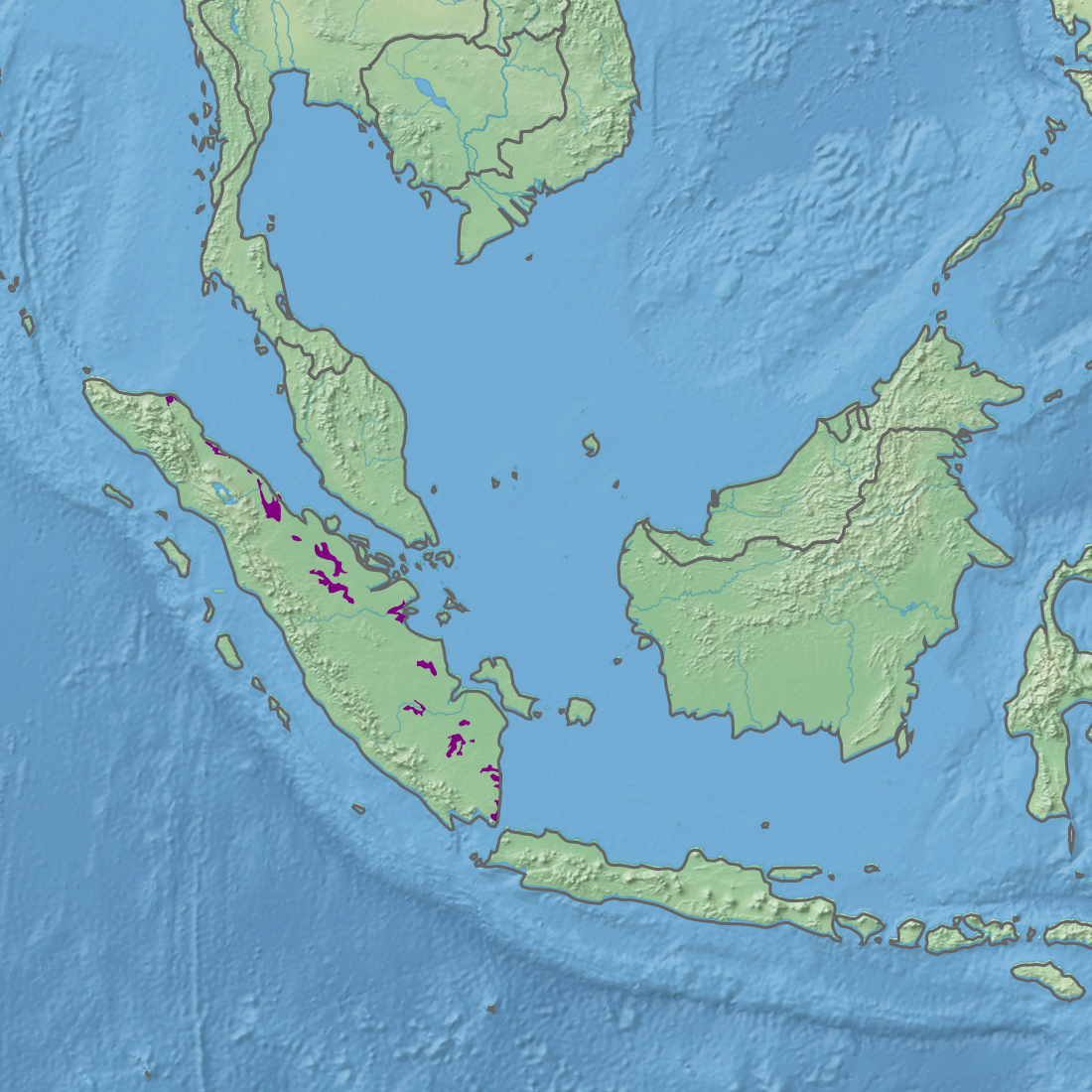
- Ecoregion territory (in purple)

Ecology
- Realm: Indomalayan
- Biome: Tropical and subtropical moist broadleaf forests
- Borders: Sumatran lowland rain forests; Sumatran peat swamp forests; Sunda Shelf mangroves

Geography
- Area: 18,130 km^{2} (7,000 sq mi)
- Country: Indonesia
- Coordinates: 0.75°S 101.75°E

Conservation
- Protected: 3.8%

The Sumatran freshwater swamp forests ecoregion (WWF ID: IM0157) covers disconnected patches of freshwater swamp forest on the alluvial plains of the island of Sumatra in Indonesia. The different locations vary greatly in their vegetation and wildlife habitat depending on the local soil types. The land has been greatly disturbed by human conversion to agriculture and illegal logging in recent years. Several of the sectors support significant populations of Asian elephants (Elephas maximus).

== Location and description ==
The sectors of the ecoregion tend to be bounded on the south by Sumatran lowland rain forests, and on the northern side by Sumatran peat swamp forests. The freshwater swamps differ from the Peat swamp forest in having less waterlogged soil, more fertile soils, and more water derived from rivers and rainwater. The freshwater swamps are all on low plains, with the maximum elevation in the ecoregion only 63 meters.

== Climate ==
The climate of the ecoregion is Tropical rainforest climate (Köppen climate classification (Af)). This climate is characterized as hot, humid, and having at least 60 mm of precipitation every month.

== Flora ==
Trees in swamps must be able to endure prolonged periods of inundation, and many species have developed buttresses, stilt roots, and pneumatophores (ariel roots with specialized respiratory structures). Common species of trees include Adina (a shrub/tree of the coffee family), Alstonia (large trees producing commercially valuable timber), Campnosperma (of the cashew family), Mallotus, the evergreen Dillenia, Dyera (which can grow to 80 meters in height), Coral tree (Erythrina), and the evergreen Eugenia.

== Fauna ==
Mammals of conservation interest, aside from the Asian Elephants, include the endangered Malayan tapir (Tapirus indicus) (very few left as of 1997), and the endangered Sumatran tiger (Panthera tigris). The grasslands in the swamps provide important habitat for waterbirds.

== Protected areas ==
3.8% of this ecoregion is officially protected. Notable protected areas include:

- Way Kambas National Park
