= Berbak National Park =

National park in Indonesia

- IUCN category II (national park)
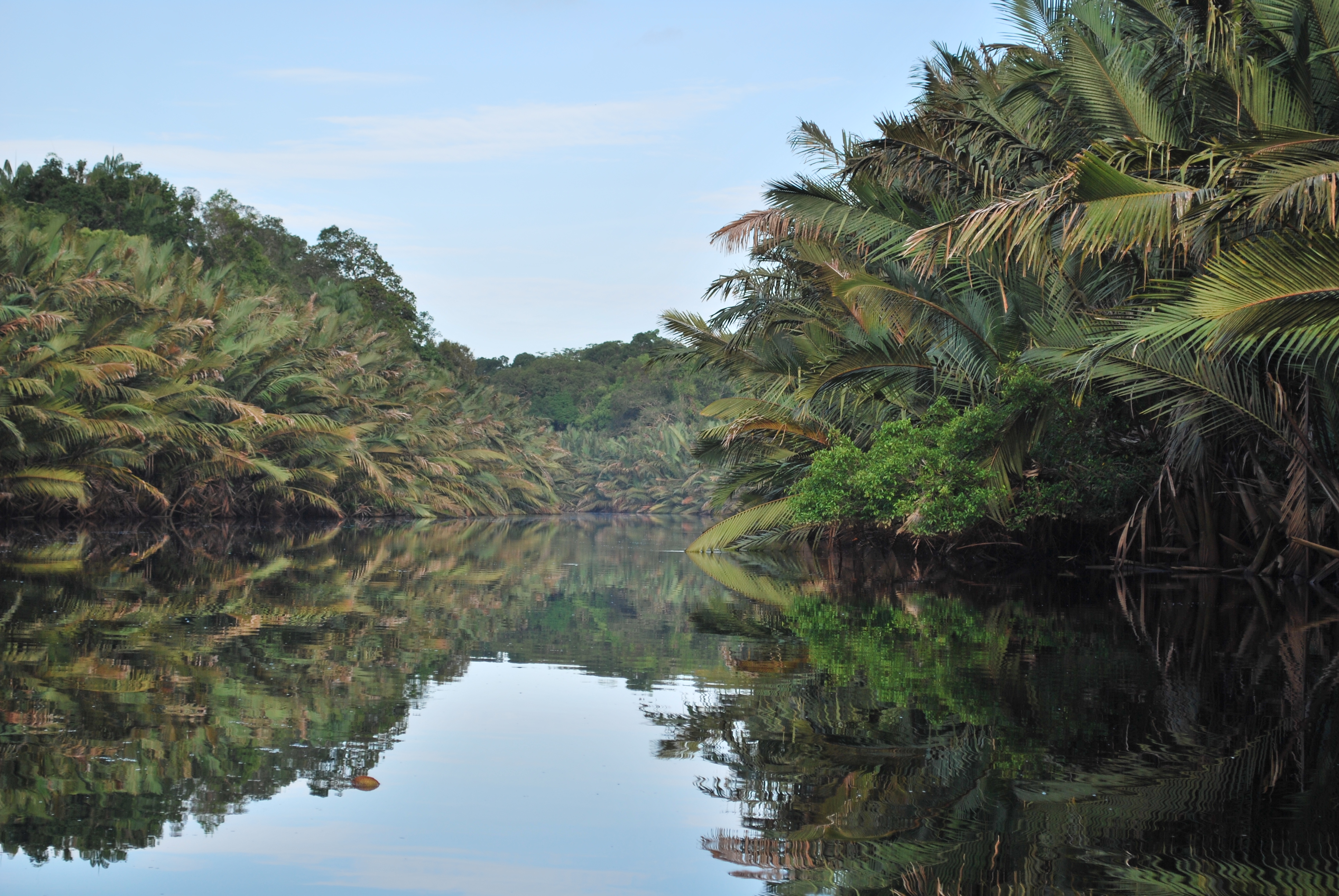

- Location within Sumatra Location within Indonesia
- Location: Sumatra, Indonesia
- Nearest city: Jambi
- Coordinates: 1°23′S 104°20′E
- Area: 1,627 km^{2} (628 sq mi)
- Established: 1992
- Governing body: Ministry of Forestry

Ramsar Wetland
- Designated: 19 November 1991
- Reference no.: 554

The Berbak National Park in Sumatra island, Jambi province of Indonesia, forms part of the largest undisturbed swamp forest in southeastern Asia, and the peat swamp forest with the greatest number of palm species. Protected since 1935 under Dutch colonial law and later declared a national park, it has been also recognised as a wetland of international importance.

== Geography ==
Berbak National Park occupies part of the vast alluvial plain of East Sumatra, which comprises approximately one quarter of the island. The region is predominantly flat, being dissected by a number of meandering rivers that drain in a northeasterly direction toward the coast. Along the coast and lower sections of the rivers, extensive beach ridges and intertidal mudflats occur. The area contains 600 km^{2} of freshwater swamp forest and 1,100 km^{2} of undisturbed peatswamp forest. Its eastern boundary is bordered by muddy coast and a small fringe of mangrove forest. The southern border is the Benu River. The maximum coastal tidal range is 2-2.5 m decreasing to 1 m upstream. The rivers are up to 20 m deep and contain acid peatwater.

== Vegetation and fauna ==
Plant species in the park include genus Shorea rainforest trees and 23 species of palm tree. Of these a number are categorized as endangered, including Johannesteijsmannia altifrons, and a newly found species Lepidaria kingii.

Berbak National Park provides a rich habitat for fauna, which include the endangered Sumatran tiger and Malayan tapir. Small remnant populations of the critically threatened Sumatran rhinoceros may still exist in some areas of the park, although they have not been sighted in recent years. The more than 250 bird species include the Chinese egret, lesser adjutant stork, many species of kingfisher, and the white-winged wood duck. Reptiles include the Malaysian giant turtle, batagur turtle, saltwater crocodile and tiger barb.

== Conservation and threats ==
The area of the national park has been protected since 1935 under Dutch colonial law, and later became a wildlife reserve (Suaka Margasatwa). It has been declared a wetland of international importance under the Ramsar Convention and a national park in 1992

The park has degraded since 1990, mainly due to illegal logging and fires. Major fires occurred in 1994, and again in 1997, destroying about 12,000 ha in the central area of the park along the Air Hitam Laut River, and about 4,000 ha along the Simpang Melaka River. It is estimated that at least 25% of the park has been affected by illegal logging and subsequent fires. Hunting and capturing of animals and some illegal huts also exist within the reserve.

In 2013 a tree house was built at Simpang Malaka, from which researchers and tourists can observe tigers safely. The tree house was built from donation made by Green Sands.
