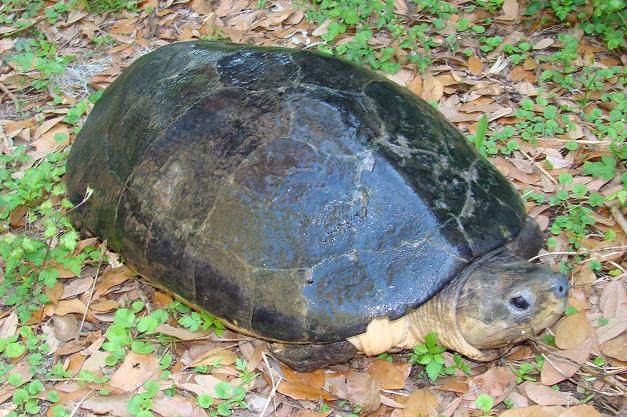

Conservation status
- Critically Endangered (IUCN 3.1)
- CITES Appendix II

Scientific classification
- Kingdom: Animalia
- Phylum: Chordata
- Class: Reptilia
- Order: Testudines
- Suborder: Cryptodira
- Family: Geoemydidae
- Genus: Orlitia; Gray, 1873
- Species: O. borneensis

Binomial name
- Orlitia borneensis Gray, 1873

Synonyms
- Orlitia borneensis Gray, 1873; Clemmys (Heteroclemmys) gibbera Peters, 1874; Bellia borneensis Boulenger, 1889; Cistudo borneensis Boulenger, 1889; Hardella baileyi Bartlett, 1895; Brookeia baileyi Bartlett, 1896; Adelochelys crassa Baur, 1896; Liemys inornata Boulenger, 1897; Brookia baileyi Pritchard, 1967; Orlitia borneoensis Ewert, 1979 (ex errore)

= Malaysian giant turtle =

Species of turtle

The Malaysian giant turtle or also known as the Bornean river turtle (Orlitia borneensis) is a freshwater species of turtle in the family Bataguridae. It is monotypic within the genus Orlitia. It is found in Indonesia and Malaysia. In recent surveys it has been narrowed down to a small region in Southern Thailand, Singapore, Sumatra, and Borneo. The Malaysian giant turtle is currently not a protected species in its natural habitat.

== Description ==
The Malaysian giant turtle is the largest freshwater turtle in Southeast Asia, reaching a maximum length of 80 cm (31 inches) and a maximum weight of up to 50 kg (110 pounds). This species has a dark brown or black carapace which is smooth and oval in shape and a pale yellow-brown to off white plastron. The head is wedge shaped, with strong jaws and a slightly projecting snout, and the heads of adults are uniformly colored dark brown to black whereas juveniles are dark mottled with a pale line extending from the mouth to the back of the head. Endoscopy shows that the Malaysian giant turtle, similar to the loggerhead sea turtle, has esophageal papillae lining the inside of the throat. The papillae are coated in a thin layer of mucus down the entire esophagus.

=== Skeletal structure ===
Fossil evidence supports taxonomic certainty with the Malaysian giant turtle with matching skeletal structures. These structures include a distinct concavity on the sutural connected to the plastral portion on the auxiliary buttress, the carapace portion does not connect with the first two ribs and mushroom-shaped second vertebral scute. The anteromedial part of the first costal is covered by a wide first vertebral covering and elongated first neural covering. All sutural connections to the carapace on the costal are conserved and the costal is 92.6mm long, 61.1mm wide, and 2.8mm thick with a distinct notch in the anteromedial side.

=== Mitochondrial DNA ===
Mitochondrial DNA has shown that the Malaysian giant turtle has the largest control region found in any turtle at 2080bp. This suggests that the mitochondrial DNA in the Malaysian giant turtle had gone through an expansion event. This expansion most likely to be from insertions or duplications over evolutionary history however mitochondrial DNA does have wide variability of mutations that includes strand slippage and mismatch repair in replication creating a series of divergent tandem repeats.

== Distribution and habitat ==
The Malaysian giant turtle inhabits large lakes, swamps, and slow-flowing rivers within the countries it resides in.

In the middle to late Pleistocene fossil evidence suggests that the distribution of the Malaysian giant turtle extended further south reaching Java.

The Malaysian giant turtle is mainly piscivorous however it occasionally takes fallen fruit and may consume and other available vertebrate.

== Environmental threats and conservation ==
The Malaysian giant turtle is Critically Endangered on the IUCN database and despite the rarity of the turtle it is not protected in Malaysia.

Malaysian giant turtles are exported in large amounts from Indonesia for its highly prized flesh and eggs for consumption. Populations of the Malaysian giant turtle suffer from poaching for the Chinese medicinal trade as the organs, bile, and bones are said to be cures for various diseases like smallpox and fevers. Blood of the turtles is also used for a stamina boosting effect. Habitat destruction for palm oil plantations have also contributed to its Critically Endangered IUCN status.

When locals were independently surveyed in Sumatra the majority of indigenous tribes know of the conservation status and practices and unanimously agree that this freshwater turtle habitat should be conserved. However, only 82% of indigenous individuals agree that freshwater turtles should not be captured and should be released when they are captured.

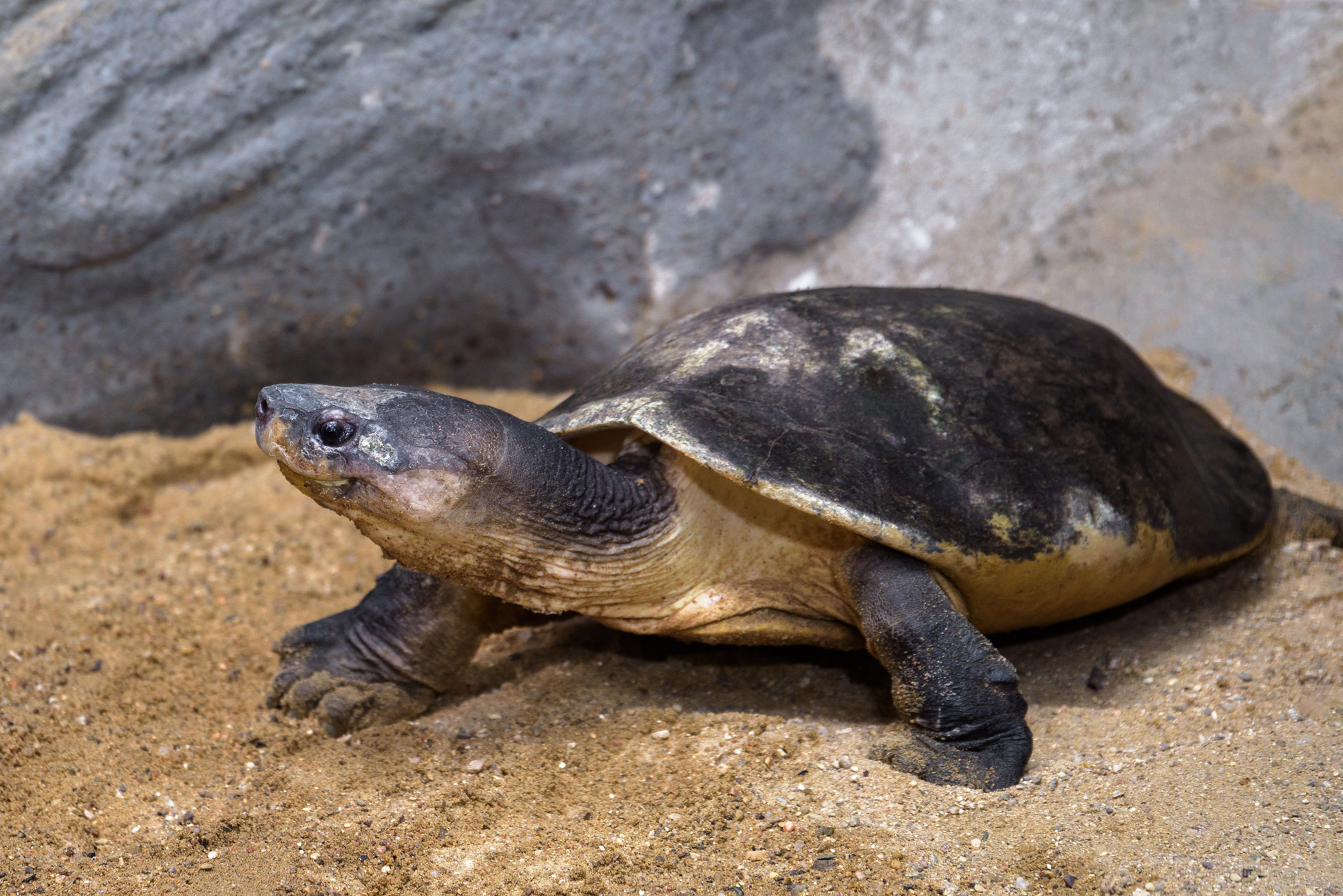
Prague Zoo

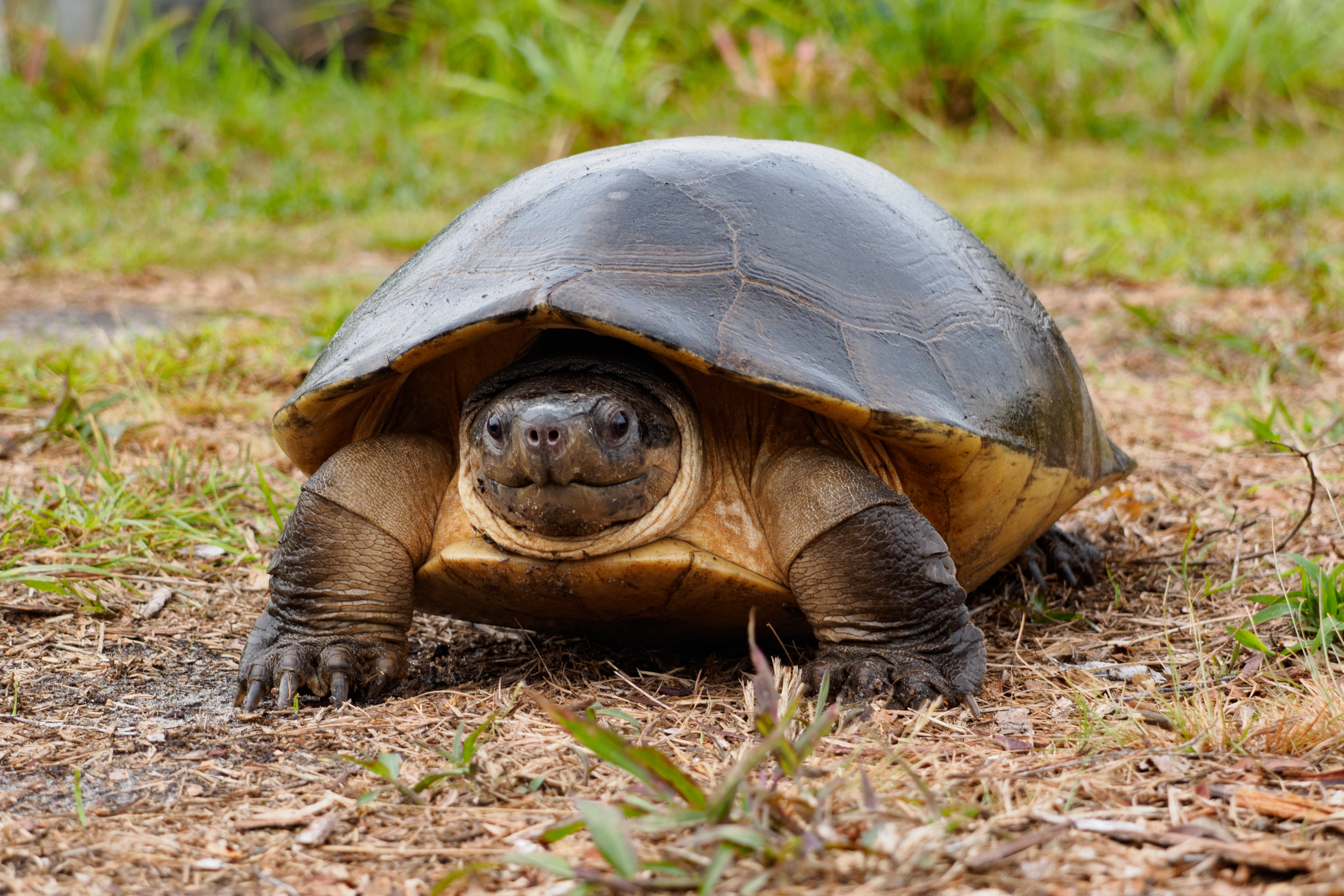
In Indonesia

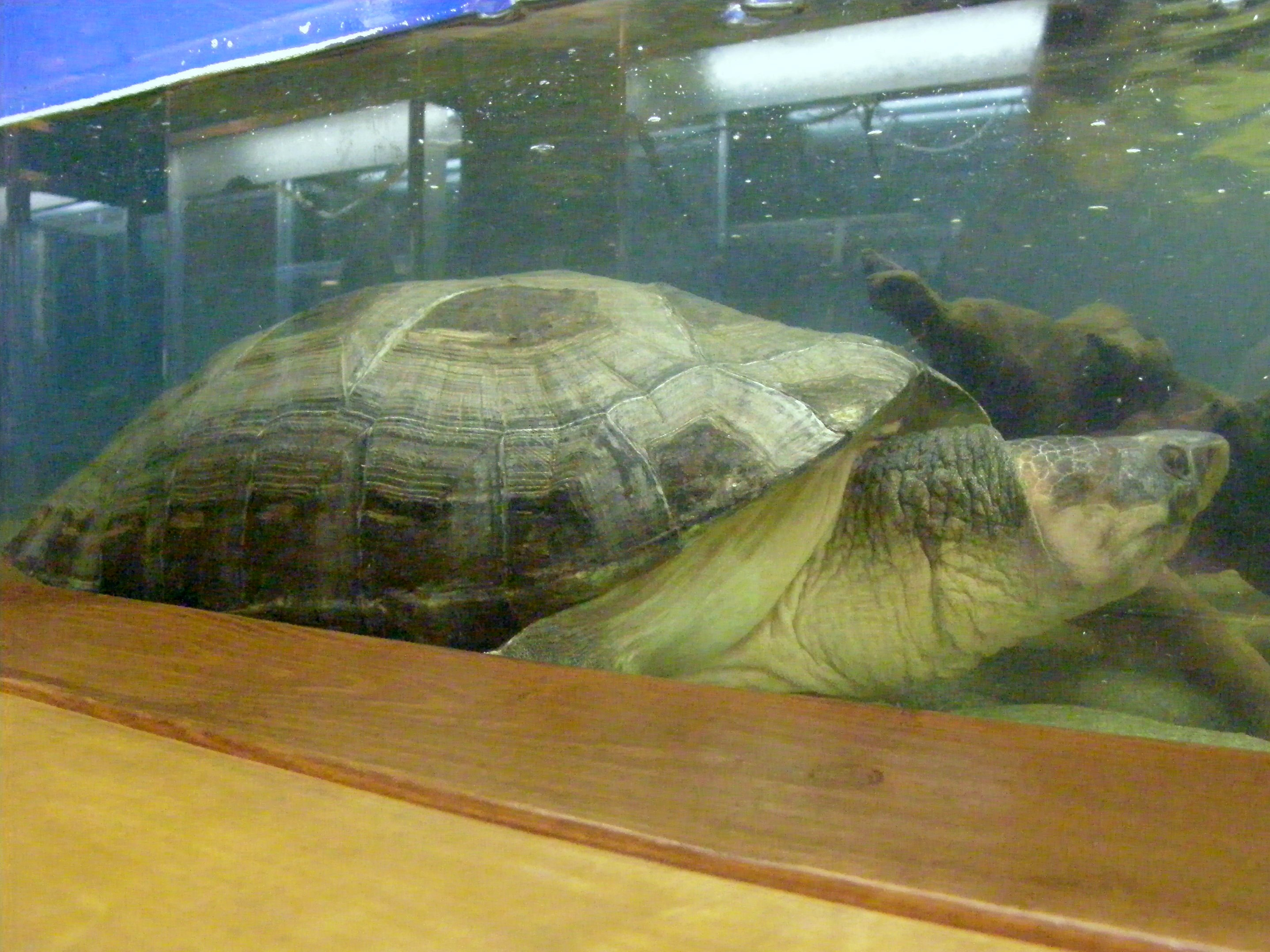
In captivity, underwater
