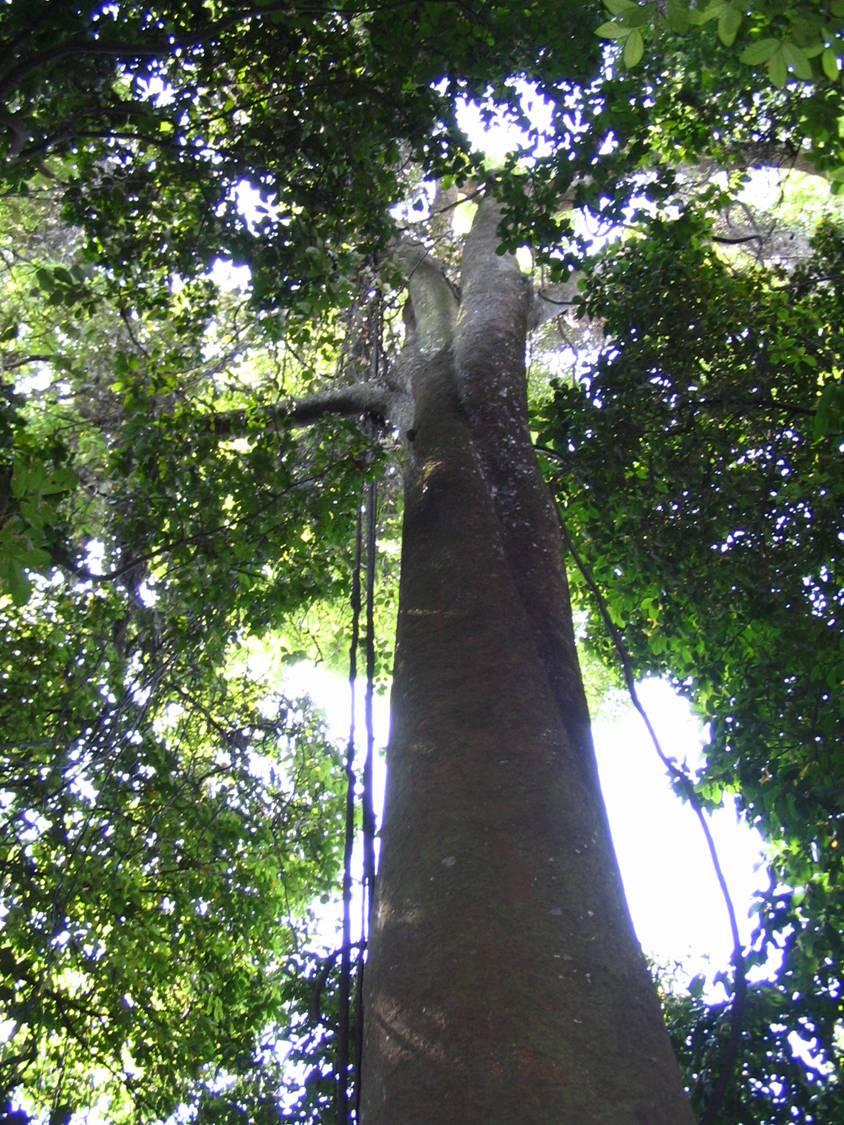
- Dyera costulata

Scientific classification
- Kingdom: Plantae
- Clade: Embryophytes
- Clade: Tracheophytes
- Clade: Spermatophytes
- Clade: Angiosperms
- Clade: Eudicots
- Clade: Asterids
- Order: Gentianales
- Family: Apocynaceae
- Subfamily: Rauvolfioideae
- Tribe: Alstonieae
- Genus: Dyera; Hook.f.

= Dyera =

Genus of tropical trees

Dyera is a genus of tropical trees up to 80 m in height. They are in family Apocynaceae, native to southeast Asia. It was first described as a genus in 1882, by Joseph Dalton Hooker.

== Species ==
Plants of the World Online recognises the following species:

- Dyera costulata (Miq.) Hook.f. - Thailand, Peninsular Malaysia, Borneo, Sumatra
- Dyera polyphylla (Miq.) Steenis - Borneo, Sumatra
