= Sumatran lowland rain forests =

Ecoregion in Sumatra, Indonesia

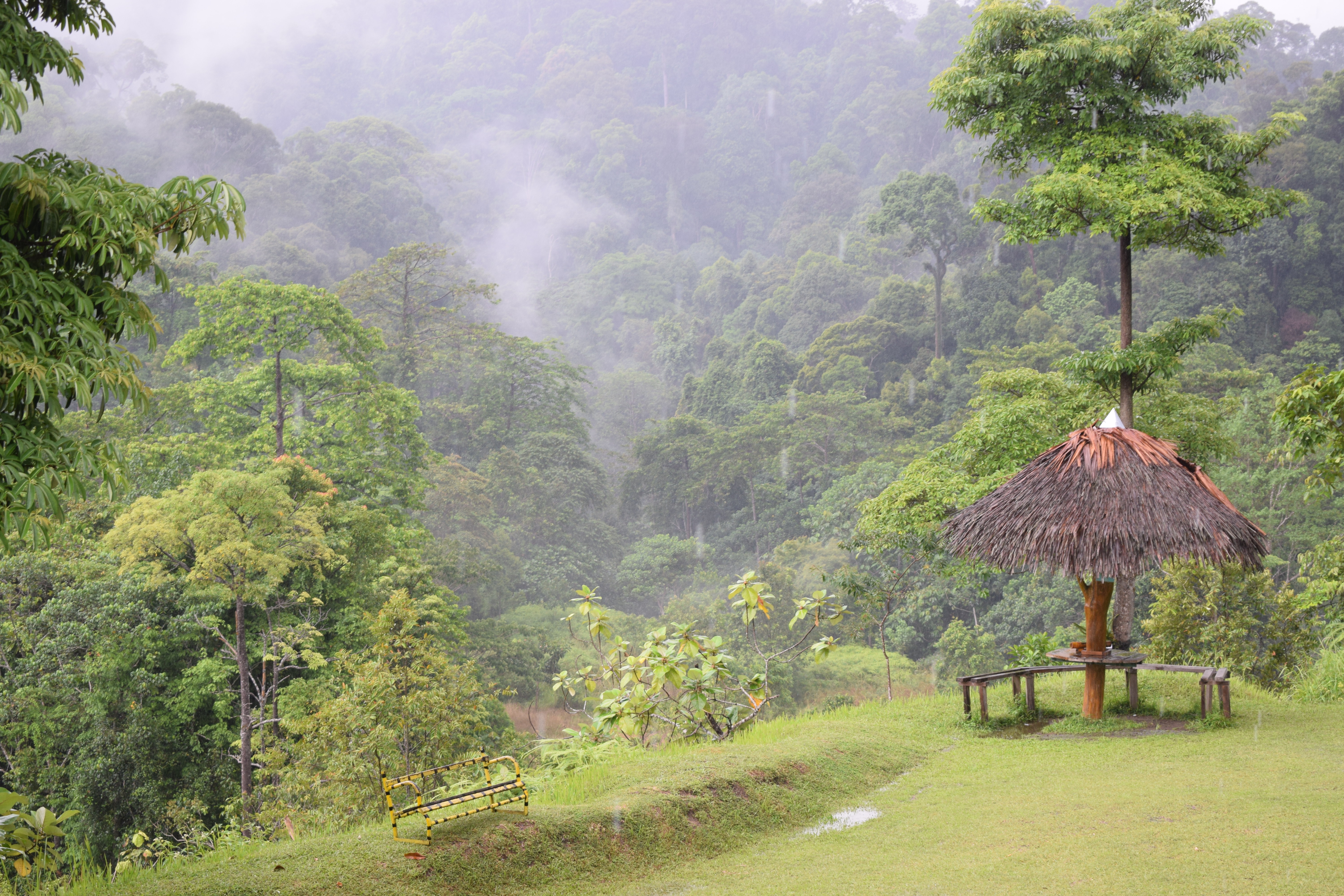
- Camp Granit in Bukit Tigapuluh National Park

- Ecoregion territory (in purple)

Ecology
- Realm: Indomalayan
- Biome: Tropical and subtropical moist broadleaf forests
- Borders: Sumatran freshwater swamp forests; Sumatran montane rain forests; Sumatran peat swamp forests; Sundaland heath forests

Geography
- Area: 260,019 km^{2} (100,394 sq mi)
- Country: Indonesia
- Coordinates: 1.75°S 102.75°E

Conservation
- Conservation status: critical/endangered
- Protected: 7.1%

The Sumatran lowland rain forests ecoregion (WWF ID: IM0158) covers the lowland forests running the length of the island of Sumatra in Indonesia. The region is one of exceptionally high biodiversity, similar to Borneo and New Guinea islands. Many endangered mammals species (including the Sumatran rhinoceros and the Lar gibbon) are present, and over 450 species of birds have been found in the region. In recent years, illegal logging and human encroachment have put great strain on this ecoregion.

== Location and description ==
The ecoregion runs for 1,600 km down the northeast and southwest sides of the Barisan Mountains on the island of Sumatra. The ecoregion thus surrounds the higher elevation Sumatran montane rain forests ecoregion. The lowlands rainforest is at an average elevation of 167 metres (548 ft), and a maximum of 1,411 metres (4,629 ft). Also in this region are the islands of Simeulue, Nias (both about 150 km off the west coast), and Bangka Island off the east coast.

== Climate ==
This ecoregion has a tropical rainforest climate (Köppen: Af). This climate is characterized as hot, humid, and having at least 60 mm of precipitation every month. The lowland rain forests on the west side of the Barisan Mountains are wetter (6,000 mm/year) than those on the east side (2,500+ mm/year).

== Flora and fauna ==
The characteristics trees in the lowland rain forest are those of family Dipterocarpaceae (Greek: di = two, pteron = wing and karpos = fruit). On Sumatra, 111 species of these trees have been recorded, six of which are endemic. These trees in the canopy can reach 90 meters in height. The dipterocarps in the understory are joined by smaller trees of the 'peacock flower' family (Caesalpinioideae). Other trees include torchwood trees (Burseraceae), evergreens of the family Sapotaceae, member of the coffee family (Rubiaceae), members of the soursop family (Annonaceae), laurels (Lauraceae), and the nutmeg family (Myristicaceae). Trees of the mulberry family (Moraceae) are also common, with over 100 species. Epiphytes (plants that grow on the surface of others and gather moisture from the atmosphere or surroundings) are common. There is little ground vegetation, mostly saplings of canopy trees. The soils are commonly Podzols in the lowland rain forest.

Mammals and birds are very diverse, with species similar to Borneo and the Malaysian Peninsula as all three landmasses were connected in the last ice age. Mammals of conservation interest include the endangered Asian elephant (Elephas maximus), the endangered Lar gibbon (Hylobates lar) (the Sumatran rain forests contain many species of primates), the endangered Malayan tapir (Tapirus indicus), and the critically endangered Sumatran rhinoceros (Dicerorhinus sumatrensis). Over 450 species of birds have been recorded. Many endemic species are found in the biodiversity hotspot around Lake Toba, located in the caldera of a supervolcano.

== Protected areas ==
About 7% of the ecoregion is under some form of official protection. The protected areas include:

- Mount Leuser National Park
- Bukit Barisan Selatan National Park
- Kerinci Seblat National Park
- Bukit Tigapuluh National Park
- Tesso Nilo National Park
- Bukit Duabelas National Park
