= Sumatra =

Region & island in western Indonesia

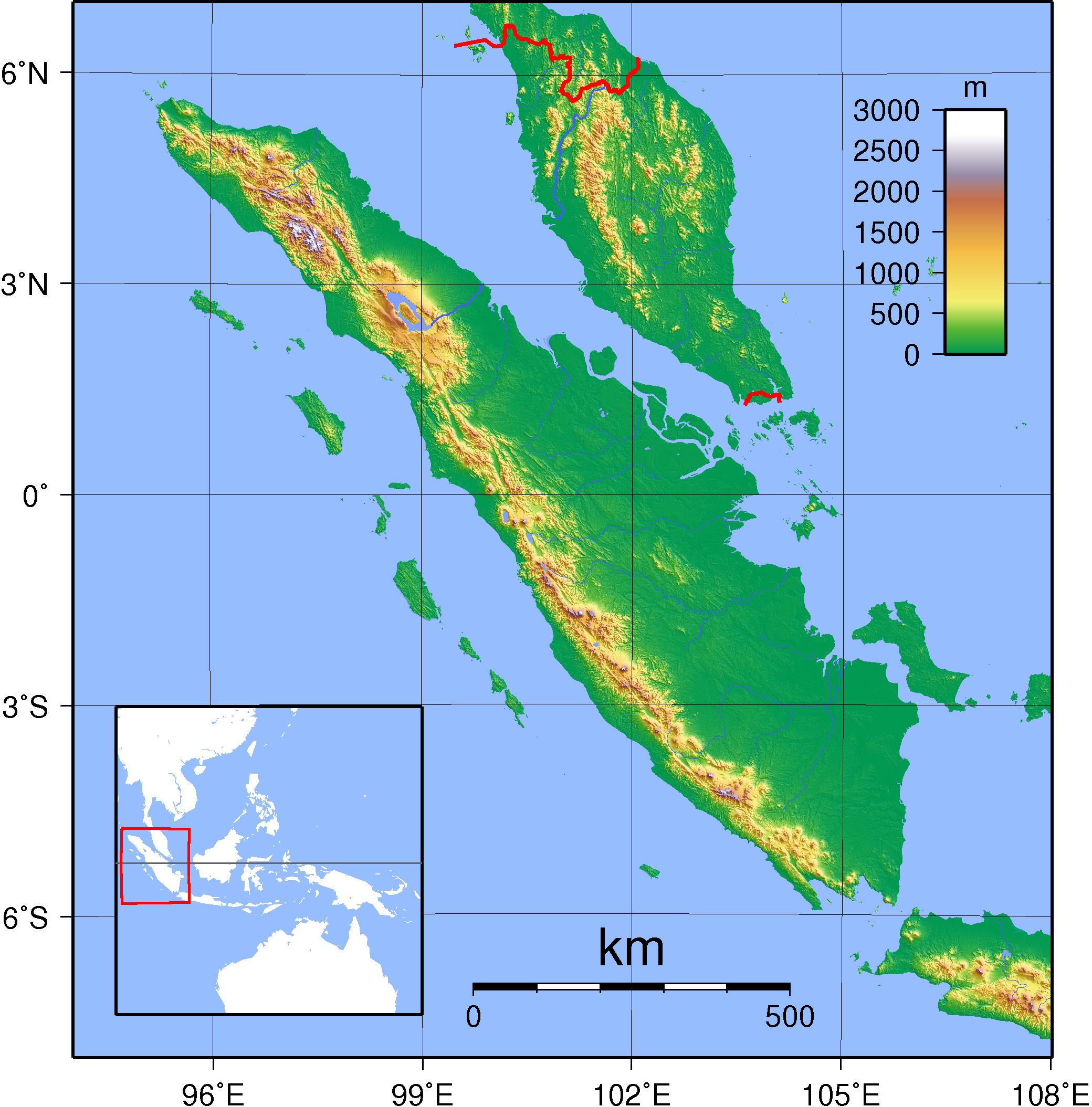
- Topography of Sumatra

- Location of Sumatra within the Indonesian Archipelago

Geography
- Location: Southeast Asia
- Coordinates: 00°N 102°E
- Archipelago: Indonesian Archipelago Greater Sunda Islands
- Area: 482,286.55 km^{2} (186,211.88 sq mi)
- Highest elevation: 3,805 m (12484 ft)
- Highest point: Kerinci

Administration
- Indonesia
- Provinces: Aceh; North Sumatra; West Sumatra; Riau; Riau Islands; Jambi; Bengkulu; South Sumatra; Lampung; Bangka Belitung
- Largest settlement: Medan (pop. 2,498,293 at mid 2025.)

Demographics
- Population: 62,259,500 (mid 2025 estimate)
- Pop. density: 129/km^{2} (334/sq mi)
- Ethnic groups: Acehnese, Batak, Gayonese, Lampung, Malays, Mentawai, Minangkabau, Nias, Palembang, Rejang, Chinese, Javanese, Sundanese etc.

Additional information
- Time zone: Indonesia Western Time (UTC+7)

Sumatra (Note: The Kamus Besar Bahasa Indonesia states that Sumatra is the correct spelling in Indonesian; however, it is popularly and legislatively spelled in Indonesian as Sumatera.) (/sʊˈmɑːtrə/) is one of the Sunda Islands of western Indonesia. It is the largest island that is fully within Indonesian territory, as well as the sixth-largest island in the world at 482,286.55 km^{2} (182,812 mi.^{2}), including adjacent islands and archipelagos. The island is divided into ten Indonesian provinces. The most populous city is Medan.

Sumatra is an elongated landmass spanning a diagonal northwest–southeast axis, with the equator crossing the island at its centre. It has a tropical rainforest climate. The island is seismically active, and the site of several of the largest volcanic eruptions and earthquakes in history, due to the Great Sumatran fault and Sunda megathrust. The Indian Ocean borders the northwest, west, and southwest coasts of Sumatra, with the island chain of Simeulue, Nias, Mentawai, and Enggano off the western coast. In the northeast, the narrow Strait of Malacca separates the island from the Malay Peninsula, which is an extension of the Eurasian continent.

In the southeast, the narrow Sunda Strait, containing the Krakatoa archipelago, separates Sumatra from Java. The northern tip of Sumatra is near the Nicobar Islands, while off the southeastern coast lie the islands of Bangka and Belitung, Karimata Strait and the Java Sea. The Bukit Barisan mountains, which contain several active volcanoes, form the backbone of the island for effectively its entire length, while the northeastern area contains large plains and lowlands with swamps, mangrove forest and complex river systems.

The island is rich in biodiversity and endemic species. Tropical rain forest once dominated the landmass, although expansive deforestation and industrial agriculture in the past century has degraded Sumatra's ecosystems and caused severe seasonal haze. Species found in Sumatra now critically endangered include the Sumatran tiger, Sumatran elephant, Sumatran rhinoceros, Sumatran orangutan and Tapanuli orangutan.

Sumatra has been inhabited by humans since prehistoric times. The island has been the centre of major regional powers throughout history, including the Melayu Kingdom, Srivijaya Empire and Aceh Sultanate. Through global and regional trading ports, Sumatra played a central role in the spread of Islam across Southeast Asia. Parts of the island were subsumed into regional empires such as the Majapahit, and the Dutch East Indies and Japanese Empire before becoming a founding province of Indonesia.

Sumatra's diverse population of around 62 million people are from several Indigenous and other ethnic groups, and more than 52 spoken languages. The majority of Sumatrans practice Islam, along with several minority religions.

== Etymology ==
Before it was known as Sumatra, the region was referred to as Melayu (also known as Malay in English), named after the ancient Melayu Kingdom based in Jambi. The name Melayu appeared in early historical records, including inscriptions and Chinese chronicles, before being replaced by Sumatra in the 14th century.

Sumatra was known in ancient times by the Sanskrit names of Svarṇadvīpa ('Island of Gold') and Svarṇabhūmi ('Land of Gold'), because of the gold deposits in the island's highlands. The earliest known mention of the current form "Sumatra" was in 1017, when the local king Haji Sumatrabhumi ("king of the land of Sumatra") sent an envoy to China. In the Maldives, Sumatra was known as Sarunadipa (meaning Golden island).

Arab traders first referenced the island as Ramni in the ninth century, and later on as Lamuri, in reference to a kingdom near modern-day Banda Aceh which was the first landfall for traders. The island has also been known by other names, including Andalas or Percha Island. Scholars suggest that mention of Suwarnadwipa in the Hindu Epic the Ramayana may be a reference to Sumatra. According to experts on The Ramayana, the epic is one of the first sources to document the relationship between India and the Indonesian archipelago.

In the late 13th century, Marco Polo referred to the kingdom as Samara, while his contemporary fellow Italian traveller Odoric of Pordenone used the form Sumoltra. Later in the 14th century the local form "Sumatra" became popular abroad due to the rising power of the kingdom of Samudera Pasai and the subsequent Sultanate of Aceh.

From then on, subsequent European writers mostly used Sumatra or similar forms of the name for the entire island.

== History ==
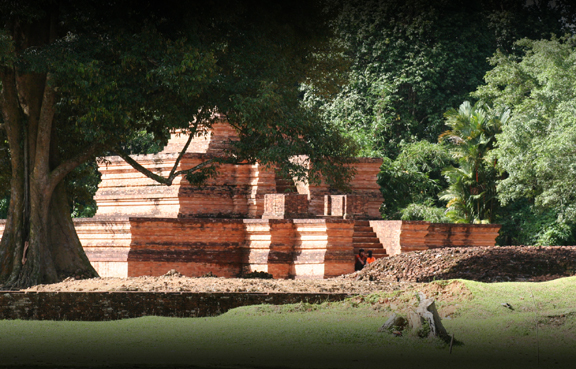
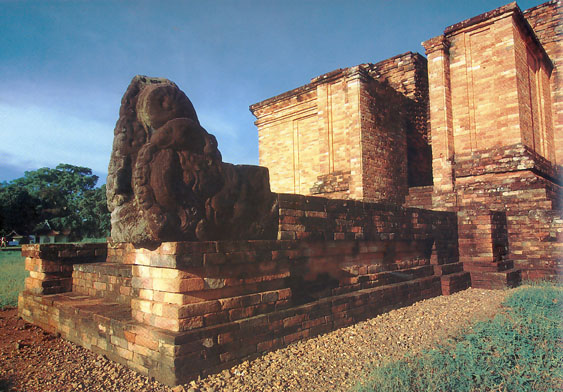
Muaro Jambi Temple Compounds, built by the Melayu Kingdom, is one of the largest and best-preserved ancient temple complexes in South East Asia.

By 692 CE, the Melayu Kingdom was absorbed by Srivijaya. Srivijaya's influence decreased in the 11th century, specifically in the year 1025, after suffering defeat at the hands of the Chola Empire in southern India By the end of the 12th century, Srivijaya had been reduced to a kingdom, and its dominant role in South Sumatra ended with the last king, Ratu Sekekhummong, who founded the milestone of Kepaksian Sekala Brak in the 13th century AD with the Dalom building.

At the same time, the spread of Islam in Indonesia occurred gradually and indirectly, starting from the western regions such as the Sumatra area which became the first place for the spread of Islam in the archipelago, then Java, then to the eastern regions of Indonesia, Sulawesi and Maluku. The island of Sumatra became the first area to receive the spread of Islam because of the position of the island of Sumatra which is close to the Malacca strait.

The initial process of Islamization related to trade and also the formation of the kingdom. Islam entered Sumatra through pious Arabs and Tamil traders in the 6th and 7th centuries AD. At the beginning and end of the 13th century the formation of the kingdom, the king of the Samudra kingdom had converted to Islam. Marco Polo visited the island in 1292, and his fellow Italian Odoric of Pordenone in 1321.

Aceh in the north of Sumatra became known in the 16th century as a trading centre for the pepper trade by shipping high-quality peppercorns. Aceh became the main commercial centre of the Aceh Sultanate and trading routes were established to the Mediterranean via the Red Sea to rival the Portuguese shipping lanes. The reign of Iskandar Muda is known as the golden age of Sumatra because he extended the cultural influence of the Aceh Sultanate to Padang and Johor.

The Aceh Sultanate sustained the rivalry with the Johor sultanate, the Dutch, and the Portuguese throughout the 16th and 17th century. When the Dutch were weakened in the 18th century the British empire began to actively intervene in Aceh, establishing close relations between Banda Aceh and Penang. In the 17th and 18th century the Aceh Sultanate battled the Siak sultanate in the south of Sumatra. The port city of Banda Aceh was recorded in European historical writings since the 13th century.

In terms of economic development the port of Banda Aceh only started to face competition in the 18th century when more ports were constructed in Sumatra for maritime transport. Nevertheless, major pepper suppliers used the port of Banda Aceh at the beginning of the 19th century. The port in Medan grew swiftly in the late 19th and early 20th century. Meanwhile the medium sized port of Palembang faced a stiff economic decline as the heritage of the Srivijaya empire was superseded by the economic policy of the Singhasari and Majapahit. The Palembang sultanate experienced a terminal decline in the early 19th century.

With the coming of the Dutch Empire, the many Sumatran princely states gradually fell under their control. Aceh posed major obstacles, as the Dutch were involved in the long and costly Aceh War (1873–1903).

During the Second World War, Japan invaded Sumatra in 1942.

The Free Aceh Movement fought against Indonesian government forces in the Aceh Insurgency from 1976 to 2005. Security crackdowns in 2001 and 2002 resulted in several thousand civilian deaths.

The island was heavily impacted by both the 1883 Krakatoa eruption and the 2004 Indian Ocean earthquake and tsunami.

== Demographics ==
Historical population
Year	Pop.	±%
1971	20,808,148	—
1980	28,016,160	+34.6%
1990	36,506,703	+30.3%
1995	40,830,334	+11.8%
2000	42,616,164	+4.4%
2005	45,839,041	+7.6%
2010	50,613,947	+10.4%
2015	55,198,752	+9.1%
2020	58,557,211	+6.1%
2025	62,259,500	+6.3%

Sumatra's population as of mid 2025 was estimated to be about 62,259,500 it has about the same number of inhabitants as South Africa, making it the fifth-most populous island in the world. Yet because it is such a large island, it is not densely populated: it has an average of about 129 people per km^{2}.

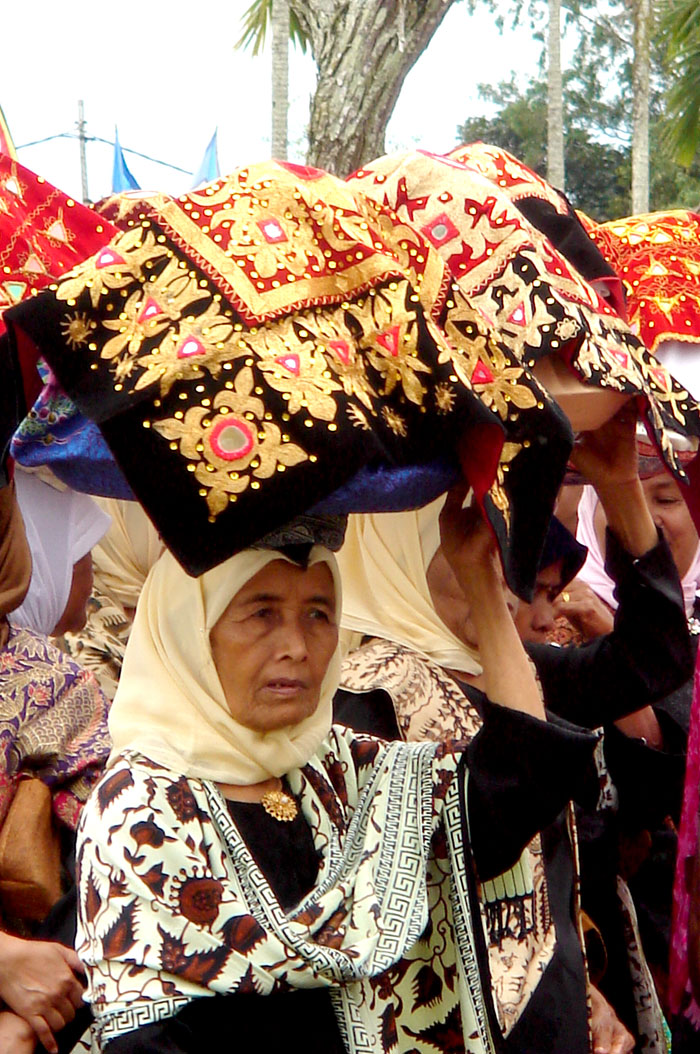
Minangkabau women carrying platters of food to a ceremony

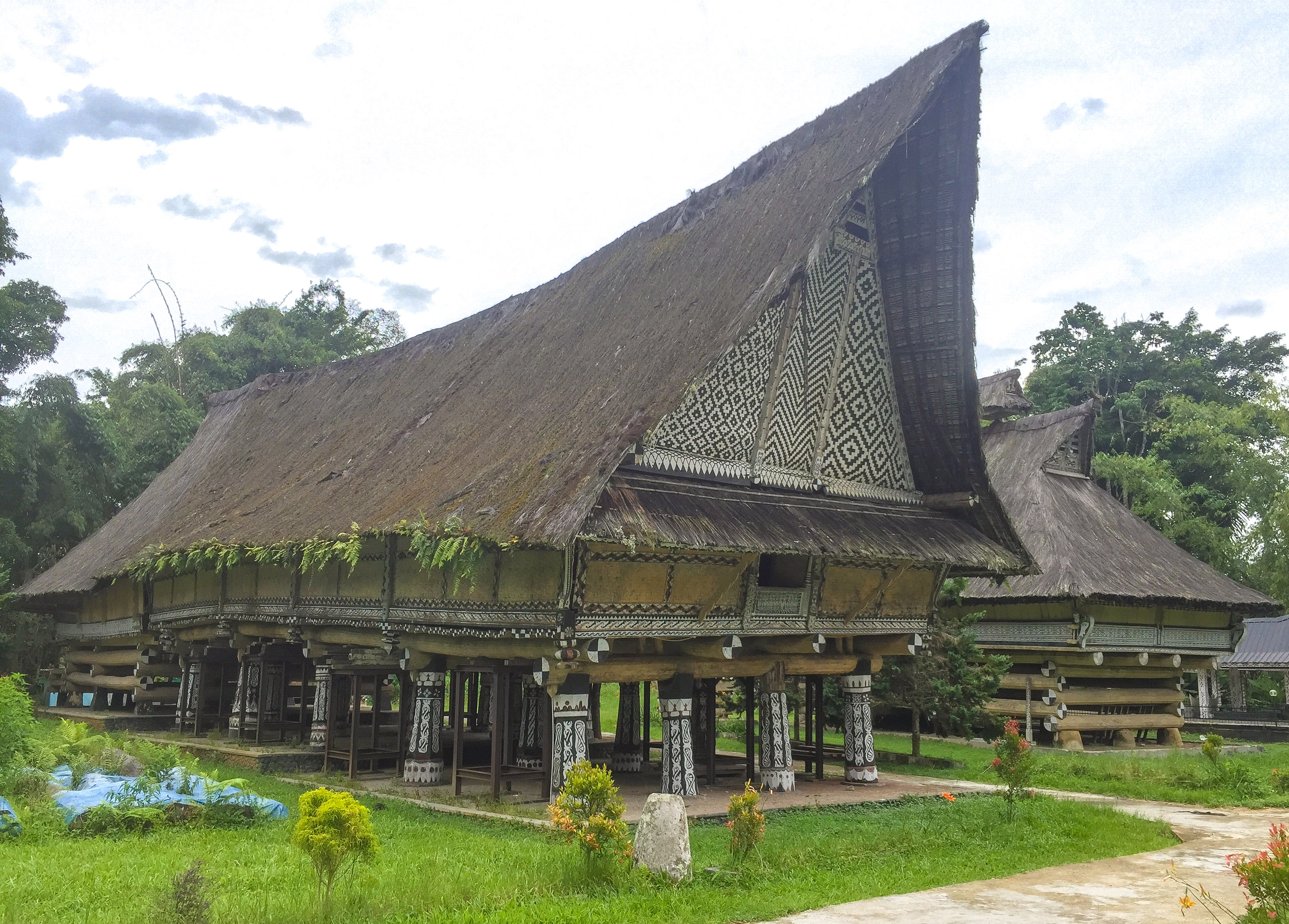
Traditional house in Simalungun North Sumatra

== Ethnic groups ==
Map of the ethnic groups of Sumatra.

The largest Indigenous ethnic groups in Sumatra are Malays, Minangkabaus, Bataks, Acehnese, and Lampungs. Other major non-indigenous ethnic groups are Javanese, Sundanese, and Chinese.

Below are 11 largest ethnic groups in Sumatra based on the 2010 census (including Riau Islands, Bangka Belitung, Nias, Mentawai, Simeulue and islands around it)

Ethnic groups	Population
Javanese	15,239,275
Bataks	7,302,330
Minangkabau	5,799,001
Ethnic groups from South Sumatra	4,826,272
Malays	4,016,182
Ethnic groups from Aceh	3,991,883
Ethnic groups from Jambi	1,379,351
Sundanese	1,231,888
Ethnic groups from Lampung	1,109,601
Nias	1,021,267
Other	2,086,804

=== Languages ===
Speakers of Acehnese.

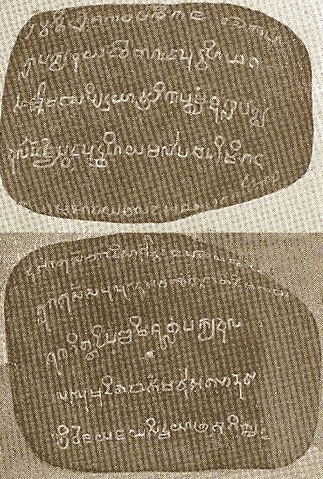
Kedukan Bukit Inscription, using Pallava alphabet, is the oldest surviving specimen of the Old Malay language in South Sumatra, Indonesia.

There are over 52 languages spoken, all of which (except Chinese and Tamil) belong to the Malayo-Polynesian branch of the Austronesian language family. Within Malayo-Polynesian, they are divided into several sub-branches: Chamic (which are represented by Acehnese in which its closest relatives are languages spoken by Ethnic Chams in Cambodia and Vietnam), Malayic (Malay, Minangkabau and other closely related languages), Northwest Sumatra–Barrier Islands (Batak languages, Gayo and others), Lampungic (includes Proper Lampung and Komering) and Bornean (represented by Rejang in which its closest linguistic relatives are Bukar Sadong and Land Dayak spoken in West Kalimantan and Sarawak (Malaysia)).

Northwest Sumatra–Barrier Islands and Lampungic branches are endemic to the island. Like all parts of Indonesia, Indonesian (which was based on Riau Malay) is the official language and the main lingua franca. Although Sumatra has its own local lingua franca, variants of Malay like Medan Malay and Palembang Malay are popular in North and South Sumatra, especially in urban areas. Minangkabau (Padang dialect) is popular in West Sumatra, some parts of North Sumatra, Bengkulu, Jambi and Riau (especially in Pekanbaru and areas bordered with West Sumatra) while Acehnese is also used as an inter-ethnic means of communication in some parts of Aceh province.

=== Religion ===
Religion in Sumatra (2023)
1. Islam (87.4%)
2. Protestantism (9.15%)
3. Roman Catholic (1.68%)
4. Buddhism (1.36%)
5. Hinduism (0.32%)
6. Confucianism (0.06%)
7. Folk religion (0.02%)

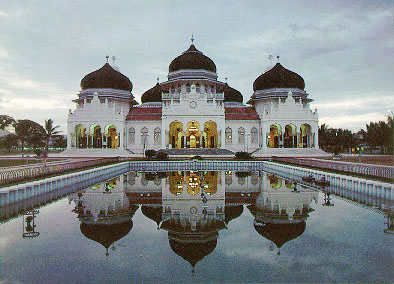
Baiturrahman Grand Mosque in Banda Aceh

Religions	Total
Islam	53,409,001
Protestantism	5,592,010
Roman Catholicism	1,023,603
Buddhism	832,415
Hinduism	193,917
Confucianism	37,214
Aliran Kepercayaan	10,893
Overall	61,099,053

The majority of people in Sumatra are Muslims (87.12%), while 10.69% are Christians, and less than 2.19% are Buddhists and Hindus.

== Administration ==
Sumatra, together with its adjacent smaller islands and groups as mentioned above, forms one of seven geographical regions of Indonesia. Sumatra was one of the eight original provinces of Indonesia between 1945 and 1948. Including adjacent archipelagoes normally included with Sumatra (such as the Riau Islands Province, Nias Island, the Bangka-Belitung group and other offshore islands), it now comprises ten of Indonesia's 38 provinces, which are set out below with their areas and populations.

Provinces within the region of Sumatra
Name	Map	Area (km^{2})	Census population				Population estimate 2025	Capital
Name	Map	Area (km^{2})	2000	2010	2015	2020	Population estimate 2025	Capital
Aceh		58,485.90	4,073,006	4,486,570	4,993,385	5,274,871	5,626,000	Banda Aceh
North Sumatra		72,460.74	11,642,488	12,326,678	13,923,262	14,799,361	15,785,800	Medan
West Sumatra		42,119.54	4,248,515	4,846,909	5,190,577	5,534,472	5,914,300	Padang
Riau		89,935.90	3,907,763	5,543,031	6,330,941	6,394,097	6,811,200	Pekanbaru
Riau Islands		8,269.71	1,040,207	1,685,698	1,968,313	2,064,564	2,213,500	Tanjung Pinang
Jambi		49,026.58	2,407,166	3,088,618	3,397,164	3,548,228	3,768,500	Jambi
South Sumatra		91,592.43	6,210,800	7,446,401	8,043,042	8,467,432	8,928,500	Palembang
Bengkulu		20,130.21	1,455,500	1,713,393	1,872,136	2,010,670	2,138,000	Bengkulu
Lampung		33,575.41	6,730,751	7,596,115	8,109,601	9,007,848	9,522,900	Bandar Lampung
Bangka Belitung		16,690.13	899,968	1,223,048	1,370,331	1,455,678	1,550,800	Pangkal Pinang
Totals		482,286.55	42,616,164	50,613,947	55,198,752	58,557,211	62,259,500	

== Geography ==
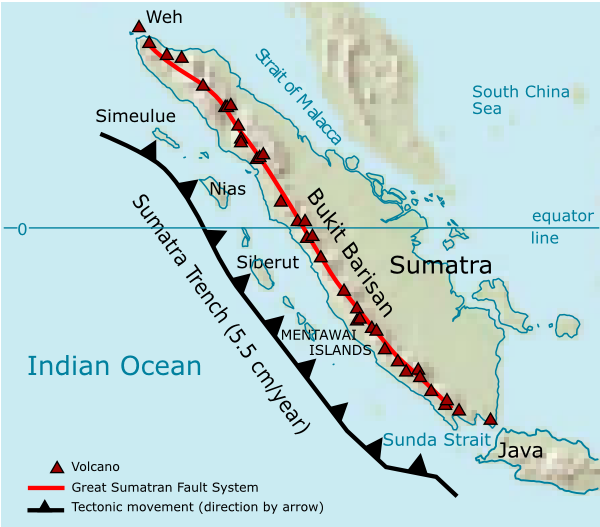
Map of geological formation of Sumatra island

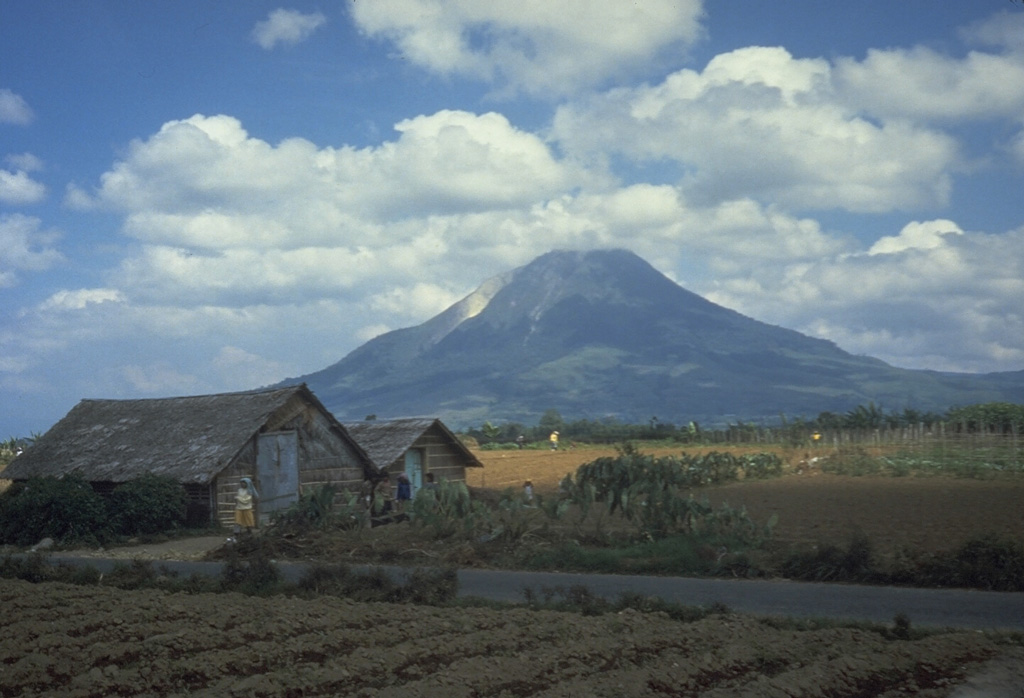
Mount Sinabung, North Sumatra

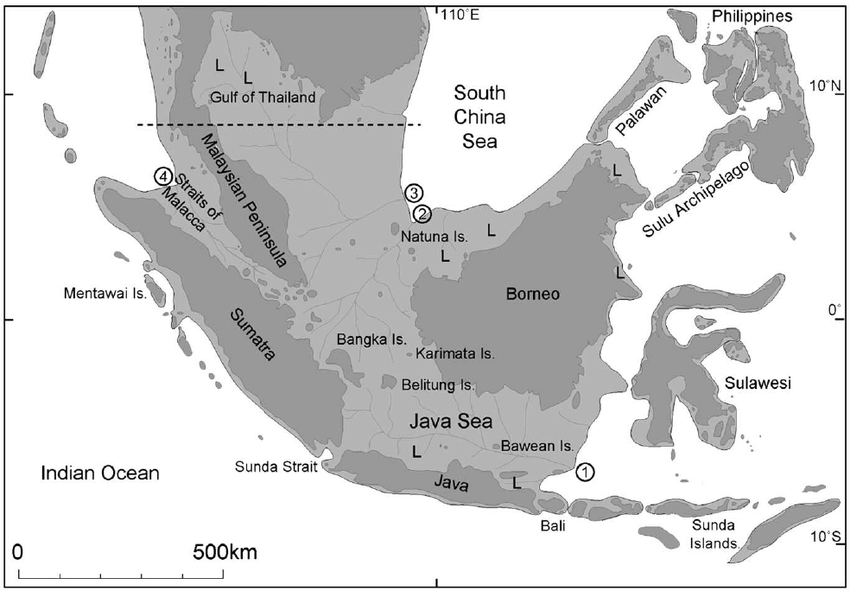
Sumatra was once connected to mainland Asia as part of Sundaland.

The longest axis of the island runs approximately 1,790 km (1,110 mi) northwest–southeast, crossing the equator near the centre. At its widest point, the island spans 435 km (270 mi). The interior of the island is dominated by the Barisan Mountains in the west and swampy plains in the east. Sumatra is the closest Indonesian island to mainland Asia.

To the southeast is Java, separated by the Sunda Strait. To the north is the Malay Peninsula (located on the Asian mainland), separated by the Strait of Malacca. To the east is Borneo, across the Karimata Strait. West of the island is the Indian Ocean.

Sumatra is very prone to earthquakes. The Great Sumatran fault (a strike-slip fault) and the Sunda megathrust (a subduction zone) run the entire length of the island along its west coast. Huge earthquakes have been recorded throughout history. In 1797, an 8.9 earthquake shook Western Sumatra, and in 1833, a 9.2 earthquake shook Bengkulu and Western Sumatra. Both events caused large tsunamis. Earthquakes are very common throughout the coastal area of the west and center of the island, and tsunamis are common due to the high seismicity in the area.

On 26 December 2004, the western coast and islands of Sumatra, particularly Aceh province, were struck by a tsunami following the Indian Ocean earthquake. This was the longest earthquake recorded, lasting between 500 and 600 seconds (8.33–10 minutes). More than 170,000 Indonesians were killed, primarily in Aceh. Other recent earthquakes to strike Sumatra include the 2005 Nias–Simeulue earthquake and the 2010 Mentawai earthquake and tsunami.

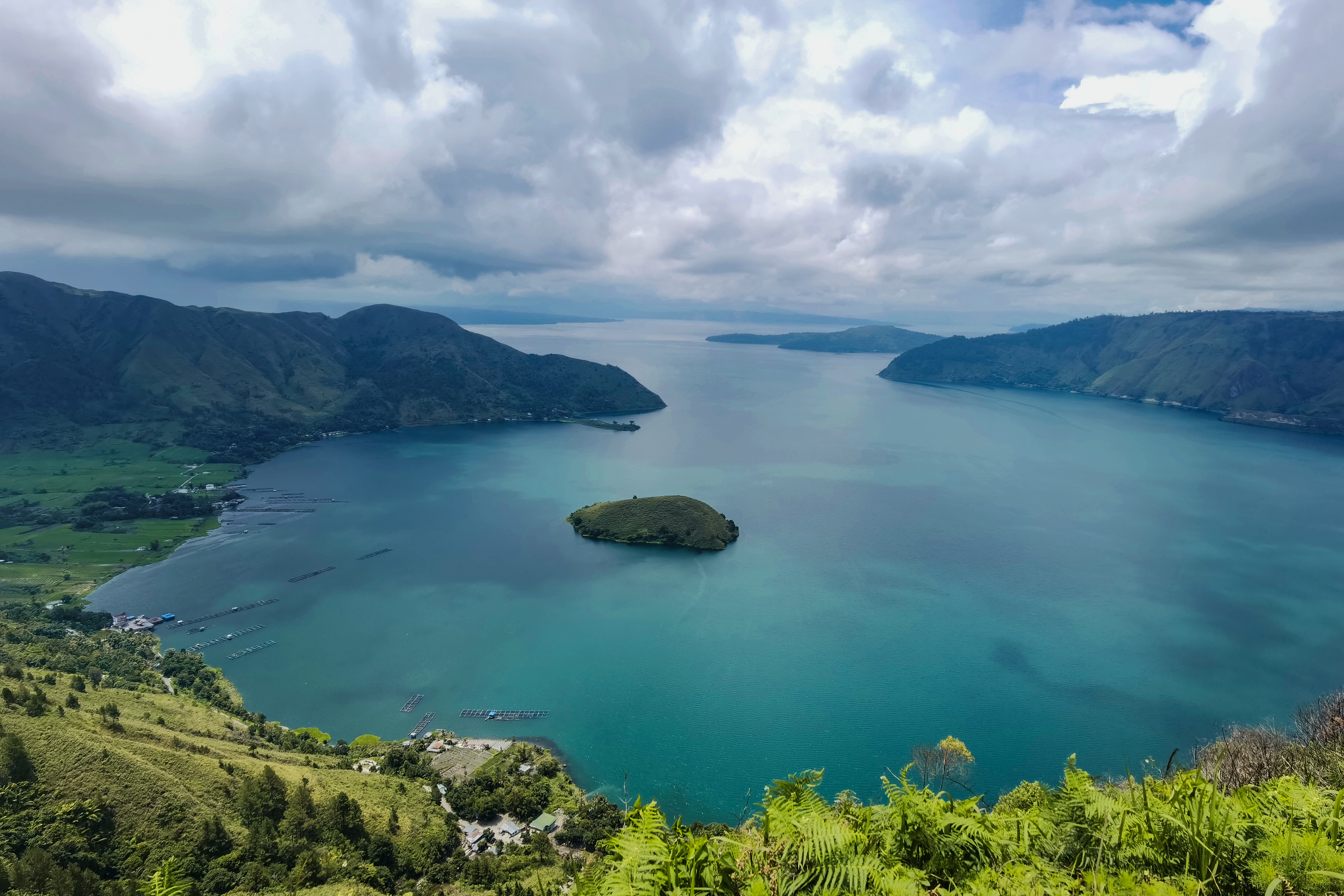
Lake Toba was formed during the Youngest Toba eruption.

Lake Toba is the site of a supervolcanic eruption around 74,000 years ago, temporarily changing the Earth's climate. The most important rivers in Sumatra belong to the catchment area of the South China Sea. Heading north to south, the Asahan, Rokan, Siak, Kampar, Indragiri, Batanghari flow into the Malacca Strait, while the island's largest river, the Musi, flows into the sea at Bangka Strait in the south. To the east, big rivers carry silt from the mountains, forming the vast lowland interspersed by swamps. Although mostly unsuitable for farming, the area is currently of great economic importance for Indonesia. It produces oil from both above and below the soil: palm oil and petroleum.

Sumatra is the largest producer of Indonesian coffee. Small-holders grow Arabica coffee (Coffea arabica) in the highlands, while Robusta (Coffea canephora) is found in the lowlands. Arabica coffee from the regions of Gayo, Lintong and Sidikilang is typically processed using the Giling Basah (wet hulling) technique, which gives it a heavy body and low acidity.

== Largest cities ==
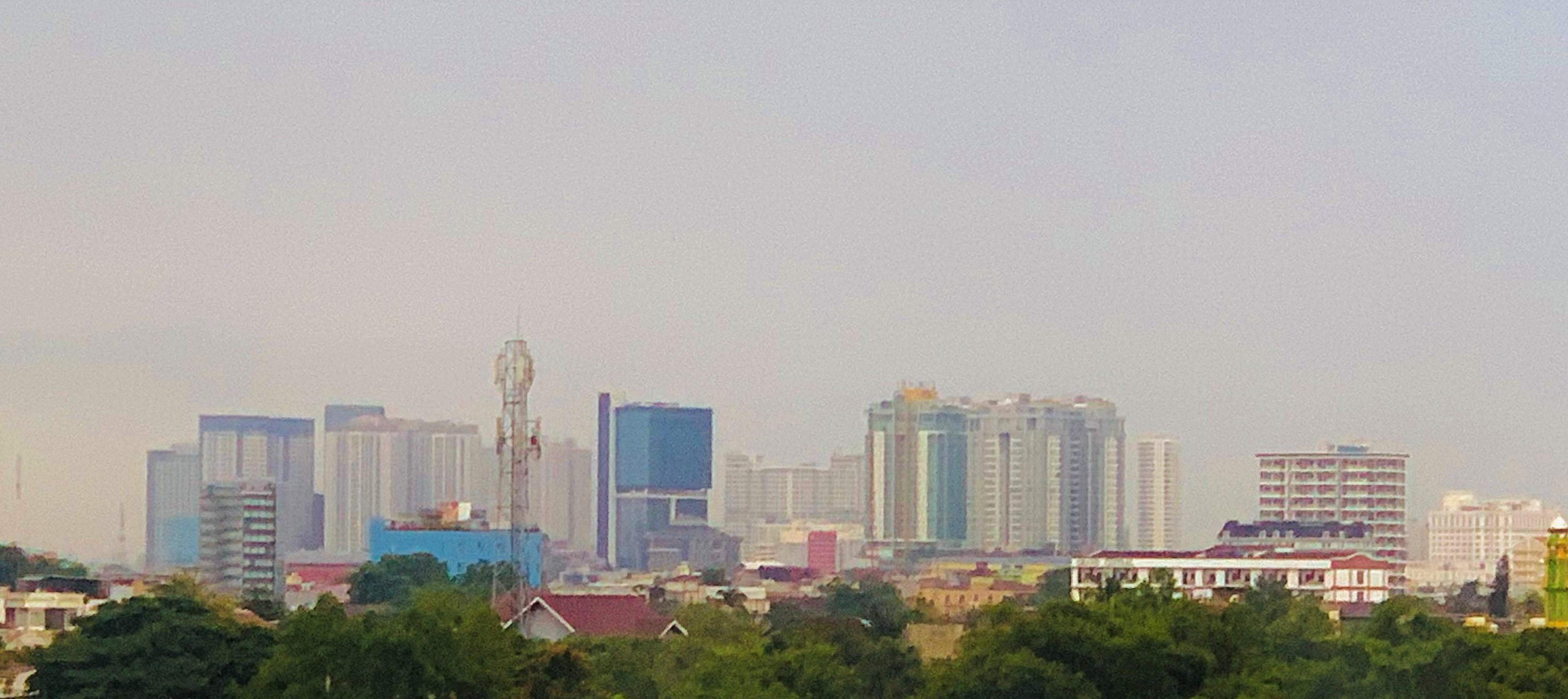
Medan, the largest city in Sumatra

By population, Medan is the largest city in Sumatra. Medan is also the most visited and developed city in Sumatra.

Rank	City	Province	City Birthday	Area (in km^{2})	Population 2010 census	Population 2020 census
1	Medan	North Sumatra	1 July 1590	265.10	2,097,610	2,435,252
2	Palembang	South Sumatra	17 June 683	400.61	1,455,284	1,668,848
3	Bandar Lampung	Lampung	17 June 1682	169.21	881,801	1,166,066
4	Pekanbaru	Riau	23 June 1784	633.01	897,767	983,356
5	Padang	West Sumatra	7 August 1669	694.96	833,562	909,040
6	Jambi	Jambi	17 May 1946	205.00	531,857	606,200
7	Bengkulu	Bengkulu	18 March 1719	144.52	308,544	373,591
8	Dumai	Riau	20 April 1999	2,039.35	253,803	316,782
9	Binjai	North Sumatra		90.24	246,154	291,842
10	Pematang Siantar	North Sumatra	24 April 1871	60.52	234,698	268,254
11	Banda Aceh	Aceh	22 April 1205	61.36	223,446	252,899
12	Lubuklinggau	South Sumatra	17 August 2001	419.80	201,308	234,166

== Flora and fauna ==
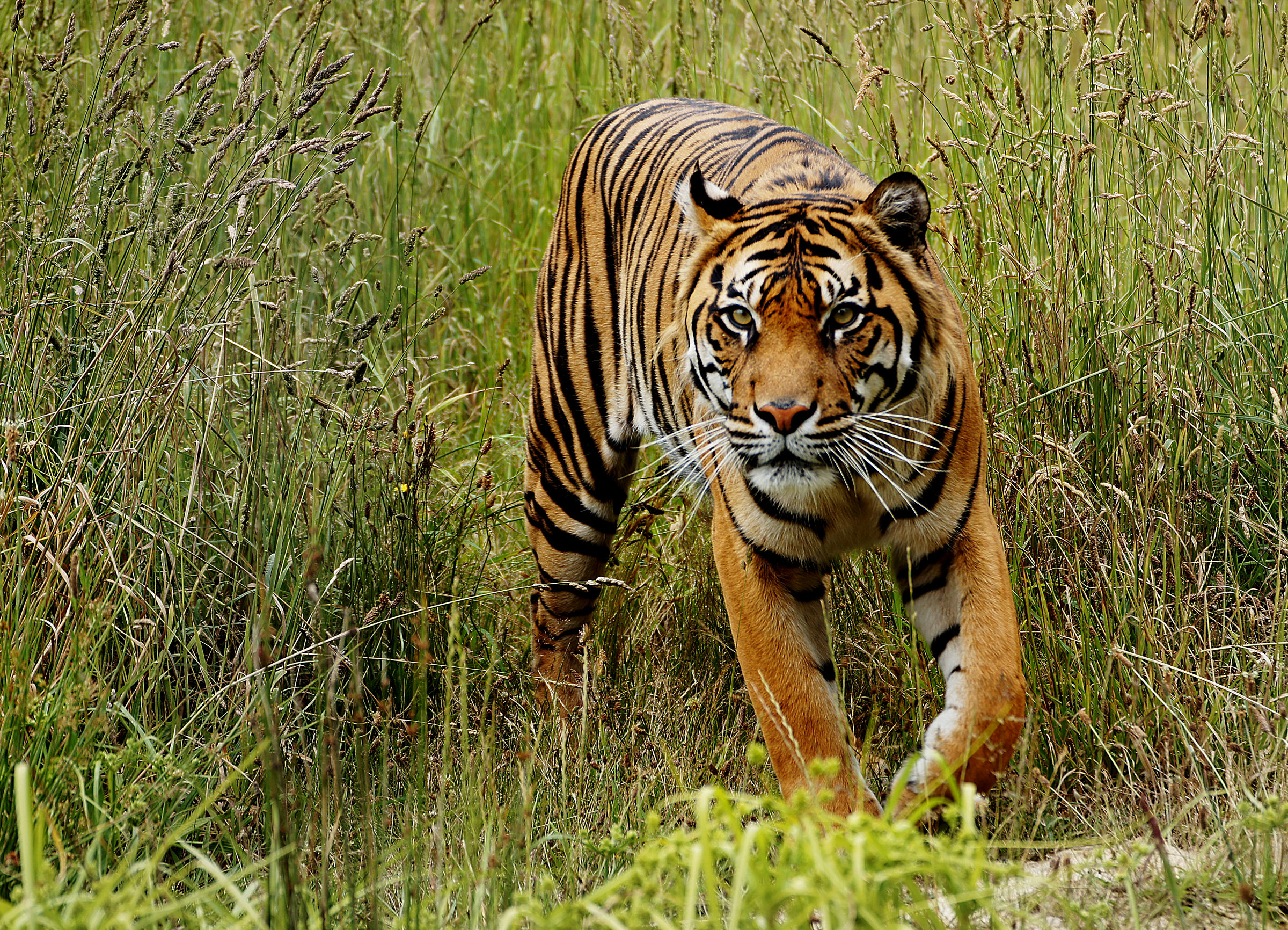
Sumatran tiger

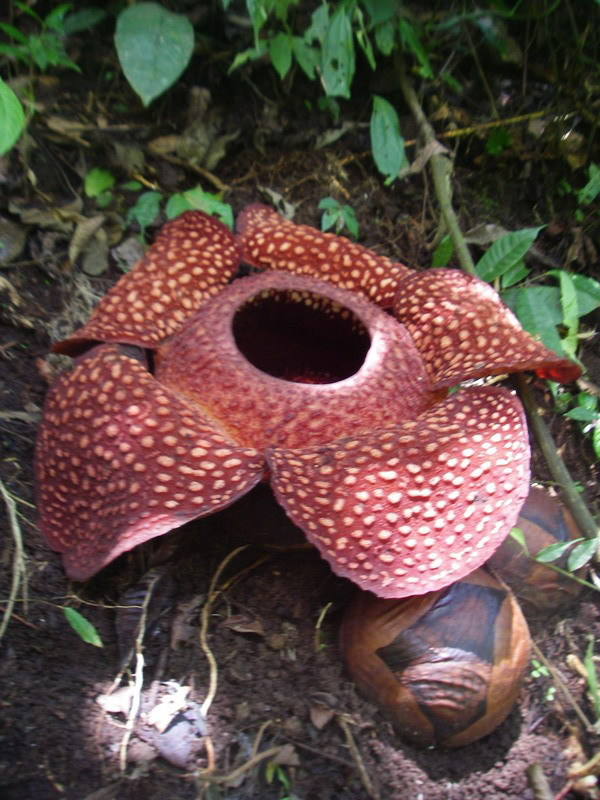
Rafflesia arnoldii

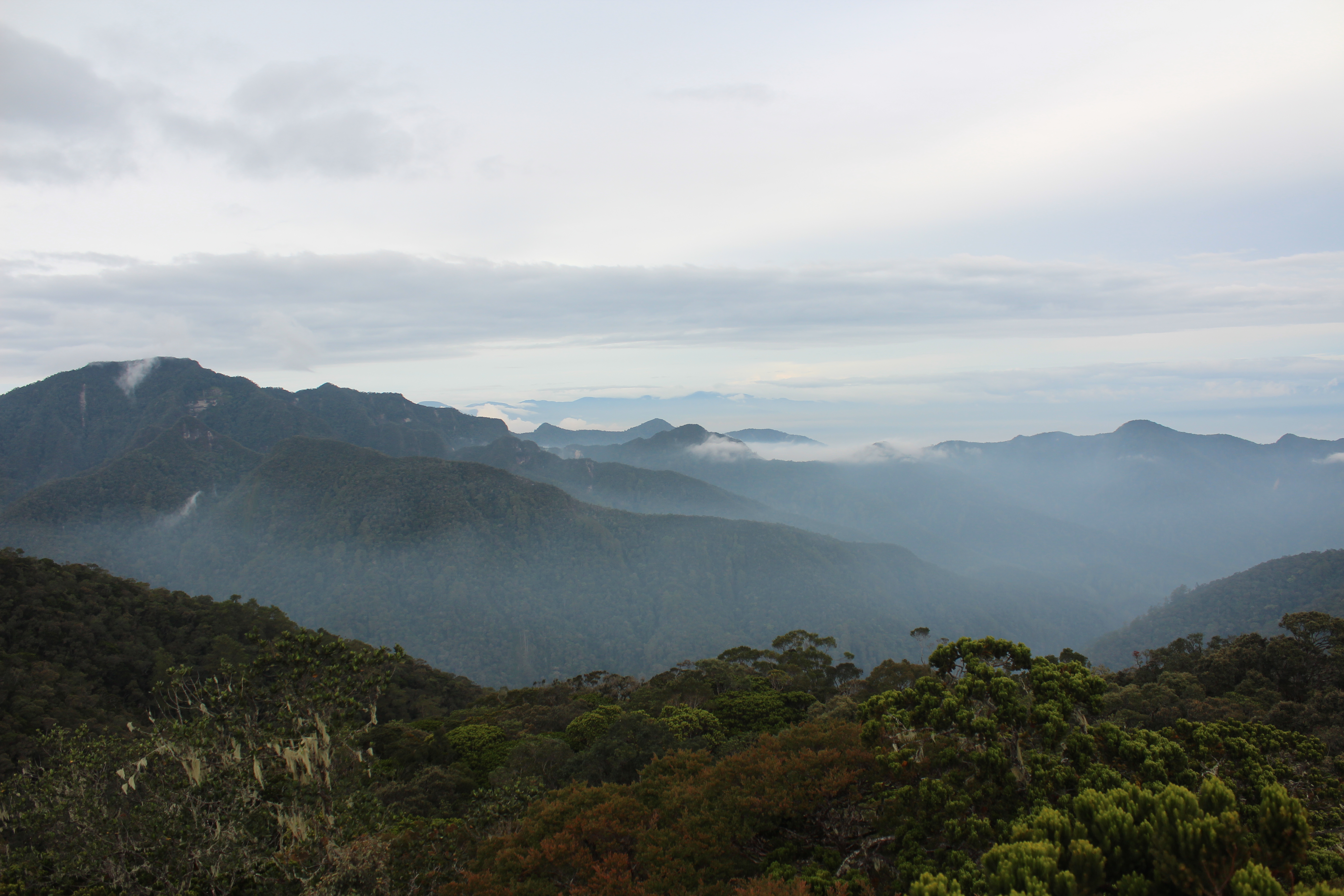
Tropical rainforest in Mugajah, Aceh.

Sumatra supports a wide range of vegetation types that are home to a rich variety of species, including 17 endemic genera of plants. Unique species include the Sumatran pine which dominates the Sumatran tropical pine forests of the higher mountainsides in the north of the island and rainforest plants such as Rafflesia arnoldii (the world's largest individual flower), and the titan arum (the world's largest unbranched inflorescence).

The island is home to 201 mammal species and 580 bird species. There are nine endemic mammal species on mainland Sumatra and 14 more endemic to the nearby Mentawai Islands. There are about 300 freshwater fish species in Sumatra. There are 93 amphibian species in Sumatra, 21 of which are endemic to Sumatra.

The Sumatran tiger, Sumatran rhinoceros, Sumatran elephant, Sumatran orangutan and Tapanuli orangutan are all critically endangered, indicating the highest level of threat to their survival. In October 2008, the Indonesian government announced a plan to protect Sumatra's remaining forests.

The island includes more than 10 national parks, including three which are listed as the Tropical Rainforest Heritage of Sumatra World Heritage Site – Gunung Leuser National Park, Kerinci Seblat National Park and Bukit Barisan Selatan National Park. The Berbak National Park is one of three national parks in Indonesia listed as a wetland of international importance under the Ramsar Convention.

Sumatra has lost almost 50% of its tropical rainforest since 1980. Many species are now critically endangered, such as the Sumatran ground cuckoo, the Sumatran tiger, the Sumatran elephant, the Sumatran rhinoceros, and the Sumatran orangutan. Deforestation on the island has also resulted in serious seasonal smoke haze over neighbouring countries, such as the 2013 Southeast Asian haze which caused considerable tensions between Indonesia and affected countries Malaysia and Singapore. The widespread deforestation and other environmental destruction in Sumatra and other parts of Indonesia has often been described by academics as an ecocide.

== Rail transport ==
Several unconnected railway networks built during Netherlands East Indies exist in Sumatra, such as the ones connecting Banda Aceh-Lhokseumawe-Besitang-Medan-Tebingtinggi-Pematangsiantar-Rantau Prapat in Northern Sumatra (the Banda Aceh-Besitang section was closed in 1971, but is currently being rebuilt). Padang-Solok-Bukittinggi in West Sumatra, and Bandar Lampung-Palembang-Lahat-Lubuklinggau in Southern Sumatra.

== See also ==
- Architecture of Sumatra
- Bukit Seguntang
- Communism in Sumatra
- Music of Sumatra
