= List of tropical and subtropical moist broadleaf forests ecoregions =

This is a list of tropical and subtropical moist broadleaf forest ecoregions, arranged by biogeographic realm.

== Afrotropical realm ==
Afrotropical tropical and subtropical moist broadleaf forests ecoregions
Albertine Rift montane forests	Democratic Republic of the Congo, Burundi, Rwanda, Tanzania, Uganda
Atlantic Equatorial coastal forests	Angola, Cameroon, Democratic Republic of the Congo, Republic of the Congo, Equatorial Guinea, Gabon
Cameroonian Highlands forests	Cameroon, Nigeria
Central Congolian lowland forests	Democratic Republic of the Congo
Comoros forests	Comoros
Cross–Niger transition forests	Nigeria
Cross–Sanaga–Bioko coastal forests	Cameroon, Equatorial Guinea, Nigeria
East African montane forests	Kenya, South Sudan, Tanzania, Uganda
Eastern Arc forests	Tanzania, Kenya
Eastern Congolian swamp forests	Democratic Republic of the Congo
Eastern Guinean forests	Benin, Ghana, Ivory Coast, Togo
Ethiopian montane forests	Eritrea, Ethiopia, Somalia, Sudan
Granitic Seychelles forests	Seychelles
Guinean montane forests	Guinea, Ivory Coast, Liberia, Sierra Leone
Knysna–Amatole montane forests	South Africa
KwaZulu–Cape coastal forest mosaic	South Africa
Madagascar lowland forests	Madagascar
Madagascar subhumid forests	Madagascar
Maputaland coastal forest mosaic	Eswatini (Swaziland), Mozambique, South Africa
Mascarene forests	Mauritius, Réunion
Mount Cameroon and Bioko montane forests	Cameroon, Equatorial Guinea
Niger Delta swamp forests	Nigeria
Nigerian lowland forests	Benin, Nigeria
Northeastern Congolian lowland forests	Cameroon, Central African Republic, Gabon, Republic of the Congo
Northern Zanzibar–Inhambane coastal forest mosaic	Kenya, Somalia, Tanzania
Northwestern Congolian lowland forests	Cameroon, Central African Republic, Gabon, Republic of the Congo
São Tomé, Príncipe, and Annobón forests	Equatorial Guinea, São Tomé and Príncipe
Southern Zanzibar–Inhambane coastal forest mosaic	Malawi, Mozambique, Tanzania, Zimbabwe
Western Congolian swamp forests	Democratic Republic of the Congo, Republic of the Congo
Western Guinean lowland forests	Guinea, Ivory Coast, Liberia, Sierra Leone

== Australasian realm ==
Australasian tropical and subtropical moist broadleaf forests ecoregions
Admiralty Islands lowland rain forests	Papua New Guinea
Banda Sea Islands moist deciduous forests	Indonesia
Biak–Numfoor rain forests	Indonesia
Buru rain forests	Indonesia
Central Range montane rain forests	Indonesia, Papua New Guinea
Halmahera rain forests	Indonesia
Huon Peninsula montane rain forests	Papua New Guinea
Lord Howe Island subtropical forests	Australia
Louisiade Archipelago rain forests	Papua New Guinea
New Britain–New Ireland lowland rain forests	Papua New Guinea
New Britain–New Ireland montane rain forests	Papua New Guinea
New Caledonia rain forests	New Caledonia
Norfolk Island subtropical forests	Australia
Northern New Guinea lowland rain and freshwater swamp forests	Indonesia, Papua New Guinea
Northern New Guinea montane rain forests	Indonesia, Papua New Guinea
Queensland tropical rain forests	Australia
Seram rain forests	Indonesia
Solomon Islands rain forests	Papua New Guinea, Solomon Islands
Southeastern Papuan rain forests	Papua New Guinea
Southern New Guinea freshwater swamp forests	Indonesia, Papua New Guinea
Southern New Guinea lowland rain forests	Indonesia, Papua New Guinea
Sulawesi lowland rain forests	Indonesia
Sulawesi montane rain forests	Indonesia
Trobriand Islands rain forests	Papua New Guinea
Vanuatu rain forests	Solomon Islands, Vanuatu
Vogelkop montane rain forests	Indonesia
Vogelkop–Aru lowland rain forests	Indonesia
Yapen rain forests	Indonesia

== Indomalayan realm ==
Indomalayan tropical and subtropical moist broadleaf forests ecoregions
Andaman Islands rain forests	India
Borneo lowland rain forests	Brunei, Indonesia, Malaysia
Borneo montane rain forests	Brunei, Indonesia, Malaysia
Borneo peat swamp forests	Brunei, Indonesia, Malaysia
Brahmaputra Valley semi-evergreen forests	India
Cardamom Mountains rain forests	Cambodia, Thailand, Vietnam
Chao Phraya freshwater swamp forests	Thailand
Chao Phraya lowland moist deciduous forests	Thailand
Chin Hills–Arakan Yoma montane forests	Myanmar, India
Christmas and Cocos Islands tropical forests	Australia
Eastern Highlands moist deciduous forests	India
Eastern Java–Bali montane rain forests	Indonesia
Eastern Java–Bali rain forests	Indonesia
Greater Negros–Panay rain forests	Philippines
Hainan Island monsoon rain forests	China
Himalayan subtropical broadleaf forests	Bhutan, India, Nepal
Irrawaddy freshwater swamp forests	Myanmar
Irrawaddy moist deciduous forests	Myanmar
Jiang Nan subtropical evergreen forests	China
Kayah–Karen montane rain forests	Myanmar, Thailand
Lower Gangetic Plains moist deciduous forests	Bangladesh, India
Luang Prabang montane rain forests	Laos
Luzon montane rain forests	Philippines
Luzon rain forests	Philippines
Malabar Coast moist forests	India
Maldives–Lakshadweep–Chagos Archipelago tropical moist forests	British Indian Ocean Territory, India, Maldives
Meghalaya subtropical forests	India
Mentawai Islands rain forests	Indonesia
Mindanao montane rain forests	Philippines
Mindanao–Eastern Visayas rain forests	Philippines
Mindoro rain forests	Philippines
Mizoram–Manipur–Kachin rain forests	Bangladesh, India, Myanmar
Myanmar coastal rain forests	Myanmar
Nansei Islands subtropical evergreen forests	Japan
Nicobar Islands rain forests	India
North Western Ghats moist deciduous forests	India
North Western Ghats montane rain forests	India
Northern Annamites rain forests	Laos, Vietnam
Northern Indochina subtropical forests	China, Laos, Myanmar, Thailand, Vietnam
Northern Khorat Plateau moist deciduous forests	Laos, Thailand
Northern Thailand-Laos moist deciduous forests	Laos, Thailand
Northern Triangle subtropical forests	Myanmar
Northern Vietnam lowland rain forests	Vietnam
Orissa semi-evergreen forests	India
Palawan rain forests	Philippines
Peninsular Malaysian montane rain forests	Malaysia, Thailand
Peninsular Malaysian peat swamp forests	Malaysia, Thailand
Peninsular Malaysian rain forests	Indonesia, Malaysia, Singapore, Thailand
Red River freshwater swamp forests	Vietnam
South China Sea Islands	disputed between China, Malaysia, Philippines, Taiwan, Vietnam
South China–Vietnam subtropical evergreen forests	China, Vietnam
South Taiwan monsoon rain forests	Taiwan
South Western Ghats moist deciduous forests	India
South Western Ghats montane rain forests	India
Southern Annamites montane rain forests	Cambodia, Laos, Vietnam
Southwest Borneo freshwater swamp forests	Indonesia
Sri Lanka lowland rain forests	Sri Lanka
Sri Lanka montane rain forests	Sri Lanka
Sulu Archipelago rain forests	Philippines
Sumatran freshwater swamp forests	Indonesia
Sumatran lowland rain forests	Indonesia
Sumatran montane rain forests	Indonesia
Sumatran peat swamp forests	Indonesia
Sundaland heath forests	Indonesia
Sundarbans freshwater swamp forests	Bangladesh, India
Taiwan subtropical evergreen forests	Taiwan
Tenasserim–South Thailand semi-evergreen rain forests	Malaysia, Myanmar, Thailand
Tonle Sap freshwater swamp forests	Cambodia, Vietnam
Tonle Sap–Mekong peat swamp forests	Cambodia, Vietnam
Upper Gangetic Plains moist deciduous forests	India
Western Java montane rain forests	Indonesia
Western Java rain forests	Indonesia

== Neotropical realm ==
Neotropical tropical and subtropical moist broadleaf forests ecoregions
Alto Paraná Atlantic forests	Argentina, Brazil, Paraguay
Araucaria moist forests	Argentina, Brazil
Atlantic Coast restingas	Brazil
Bahia coastal forests	Brazil
Bahia interior forests	Brazil
Bolivian Yungas	Bolivia, Peru
Caatinga enclaves moist forests	Brazil
Caquetá moist forests	Brazil, Colombia
Catatumbo moist forests	Venezuela
Cauca Valley montane forests	Colombia
Cayos Miskitos–San Andrés and Providencia moist forests	Colombia, Nicaragua
Central American Atlantic moist forests	Costa Rica, Nicaragua, Panama
Central American montane forests	El Salvador, Guatemala, Honduras, Mexico, Nicaragua
Chiapas montane forests	Mexico
Chimalapas montane forests	Mexico
Chocó–Darién moist forests	Colombia, Ecuador, Panama
Cocos Island moist forests	Costa Rica
Cordillera de la Costa montane forests	Venezuela
Cordillera Oriental montane forests	Colombia, Venezuela
Costa Rican seasonal moist forests	Costa Rica, Nicaragua
Cuban moist forests	Cuba
Eastern Cordillera Real montane forests	Colombia, Ecuador, Peru
Eastern Panamanian montane forests	Colombia, Panama
Fernando de Noronha-Atol das Rocas moist forests	Brazil
Guayanan Highlands moist forests	Brazil, Colombia, Guyana, Suriname, Venezuela
Guianan moist forests	Brazil, French Guiana, Guyana, Suriname, Venezuela
Guianan piedmont and lowland moist forests	Brazil, Venezuela
Gurupa várzea	Brazil
Hispaniolan moist forests	Dominican Republic, Haiti
Iquitos várzea	Bolivia, Brazil, Peru
Isthmian–Atlantic moist forests	Costa Rica, Nicaragua, Panama
Isthmian–Pacific moist forests	Costa Rica, Panama
Jamaican moist forests	Jamaica
Japurá–Solimões–Negro moist forests	Brazil, Colombia, Venezuela
Juruá–Purus moist forests	Brazil
Leeward Islands moist forests	Antigua, British Virgin Islands, Guadeloupe, Montserrat, Nevis, Saint Kitts, British Virgin Islands
Madeira–Tapajós moist forests	Bolivia, Brazil
Magdalena Valley montane forests	Colombia
Magdalena–Urabá moist forests	Colombia
Marajó várzea	Brazil
Maranhão Babaçu forests	Brazil
Mato Grosso tropical dry forests	Brazil
Monte Alegre várzea	Brazil
Napo moist forests	Colombia, Ecuador, Peru
Negro–Branco moist forests	Brazil, Colombia, Venezuela
Northeastern Brazil restingas	Brazil
Northwestern Andean montane forests	Colombia, Ecuador
Oaxacan montane forests	Mexico
Orinoco Delta swamp forests	Guyana, Venezuela
Pantanos de Centla	Mexico
Paramaribo swamp forests	Guyana, Suriname
Pernambuco coastal forests	Brazil
Pernambuco interior forests	Brazil
Peruvian Yungas	Peru
Petén–Veracruz moist forests	Mexico
Puerto Rican moist forests	Puerto Rico
Purus várzea	Brazil
Purus–Madeira moist forests	Brazil
Rio Negro campinarana	Brazil, Colombia
Santa Marta montane forests	Colombia
Serra do Mar coastal forests	Brazil
Sierra de los Tuxtlas	Mexico
Sierra Madre de Chiapas moist forests	El Salvador, Guatemala, Mexico
Solimões–Japurá moist forests	Brazil, Colombia, Peru
South Florida rocklands	United States
Southern Andean Yungas	Argentina, Bolivia
Southwest Amazon moist forests	Bolivia, Brazil, Peru
Talamancan montane forests	Costa Rica, Panama
Tapajós–Xingu moist forests	Brazil
Tepuis	Brazil, Guyana, Suriname, Venezuela
Tocantins–Araguaia–Maranhão moist forests	Brazil
Trinidad and Tobago moist forests	Trinidad and Tobago
Trindade-Martin Vaz Islands tropical forests	Brazil
Uatuma–Trombetas moist forests	Brazil, Guyana, Suriname
Ucayali moist forests	Peru
Venezuelan Andes montane forests	Colombia, Venezuela
Veracruz moist forests	Mexico
Veracruz montane forests	Mexico
Western Ecuador moist forests	Colombia, Ecuador
Windward Islands moist forests	Dominica, Grenada, Martinique, Saint Lucia, Saint Vincent and the Grenadines
Xingu–Tocantins–Araguaia moist forests	Brazil
Yucatán moist forests	Belize, Guatemala, Mexico

== Oceanian realm ==
Oceanian tropical and subtropical moist broadleaf forests ecoregions
Carolines tropical moist forests	Federated States of Micronesia
Central Polynesian tropical moist forests	Cook Islands, Jarvis Island, Johnston Atoll, Kiribati, Palmyra Atoll
Cook Islands tropical moist forests	Cook Islands
Eastern Micronesia tropical moist forests	Kiribati, Marshall Islands, Nauru, Wake Island
Fiji tropical moist forests	Fiji, Wallis and Futuna
Hawaiian tropical rainforests	Hawaiʻi
Kermadec Islands subtropical moist forests	New Zealand
Marquesas tropical moist forests	French Polynesia
Ogasawara subtropical moist forests	Bonin Islands (Japan)
Palau tropical moist forests	Palau
Rapa Nui and Sala-y-Gomez tropical broadleaf forests	Easter Island (Chile)
Samoan tropical moist forests	American Samoa, Samoa
Society Islands tropical moist forests	French Polynesia
Tongan tropical moist forests	Niue, Tonga
Tuamotu tropical moist forests	French Polynesia, Pitcairn Islands
Tubuai tropical moist forests	French Polynesia
Western Polynesian tropical moist forests	Baker Island, Howland Island, Kiribati, Swains Island, Tokelau, Tuvalu

== Palearctic realm ==
Palearctic tropical and subtropical moist broadleaf forests ecoregions
Guizhou Plateau broadleaf and mixed forests	China
Yunnan Plateau subtropical evergreen forests	China

== See also ==
- Biome
- Ecoregion
- Tropical and subtropical moist broadleaf forests
- Tropical rainforest
