= Geography of Kiribati =

- Region: Oceania
- Coordinates: 1°25′N 173°00′E
- Area: Ranked 172nd
  - Total: 811 km^{2} (313 sq mi)
  - Land: .1%
  - Water: 99.9%
- Coastline: 1,143 km (710 mi)
- Borders: None
- Highest point: Unnamed location on Banaba; 81 m (266 ft)
- Lowest point: Sea Level, 0 m (0 ft)
- Climate: Maritime
- Terrain: Atolls
- Natural resources: Guano, fish, coconuts, petroleum
- Natural hazards: Cyclones
- Environmental issues: rising sea levels
- Exclusive economic zone: 3,441,810 km^{2} (1,328,890 mi^{2})

Kiribati consists of 32 atolls and one island in an expanse of ocean equivalent in size to the contiguous United States. The islands are scattered such that Kiribati has territory located in each of the four hemispheres. The islands of Kiribati lie roughly halfway between Hawaii and Australia in the Micronesian and Polynesian regions of the South Pacific. The three main island groupings are the Gilbert Islands, Phoenix Islands, and Line Islands. On 1 January 1995 Kiribati moved the International Date Line to include its easternmost islands and make it the same day throughout the country.

== Geography ==
Kiribati includes Kiritimati (Christmas Atoll; in the Line Islands), the largest coral atoll (in terms of land area, not dimensions) in the world, and Banaba (Ocean Island), one of the three great phosphate rock islands in the Pacific.

Kiribati straddles the equator in the Pacific Ocean, about one-half of the way from Hawaii to Australia. On 1 January 1995, Kiribati unilaterally moved the International Date Line from the middle of the country to include its easternmost islands and make it the same day throughout the country.

=== Area ===
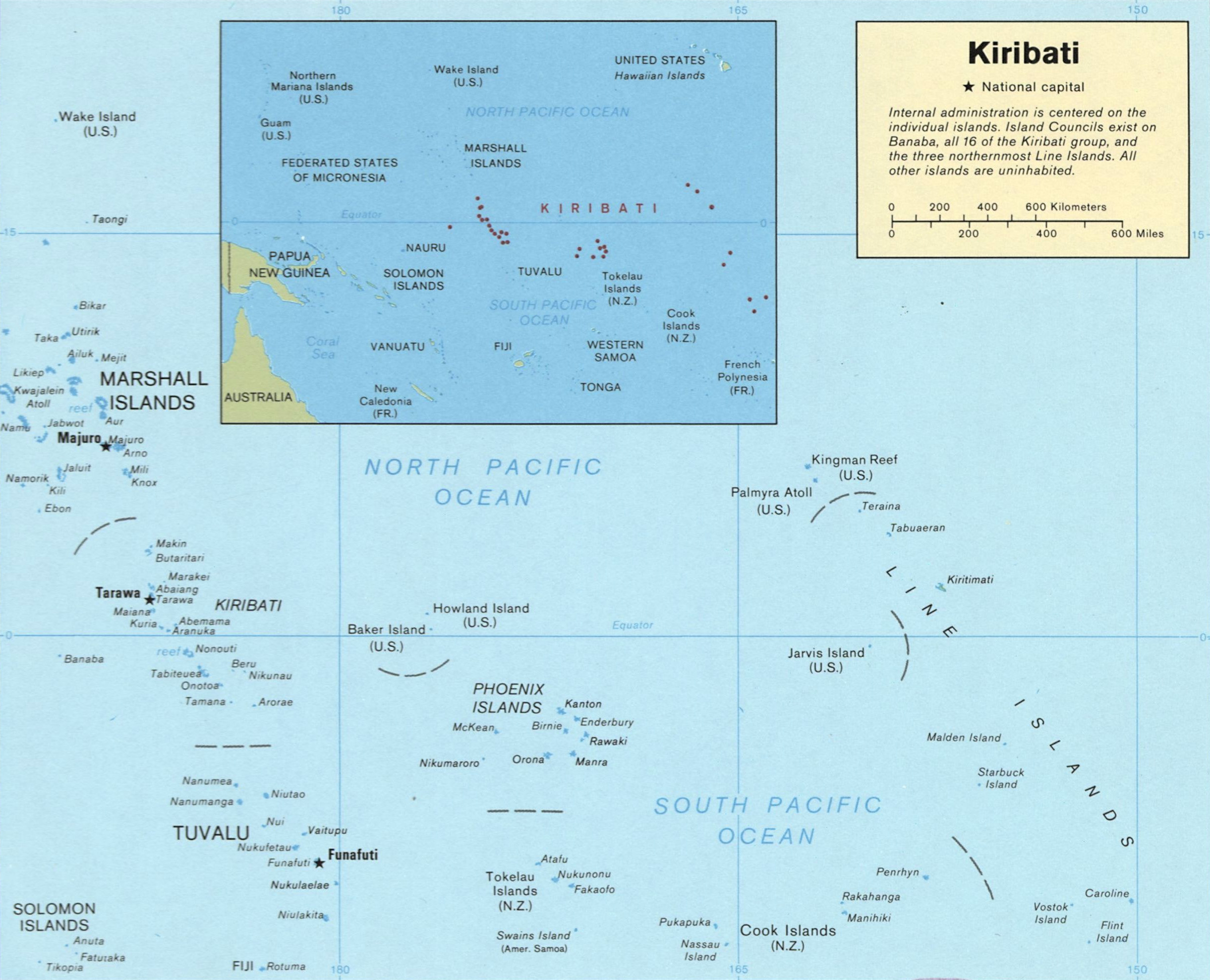
A map of Kiribati

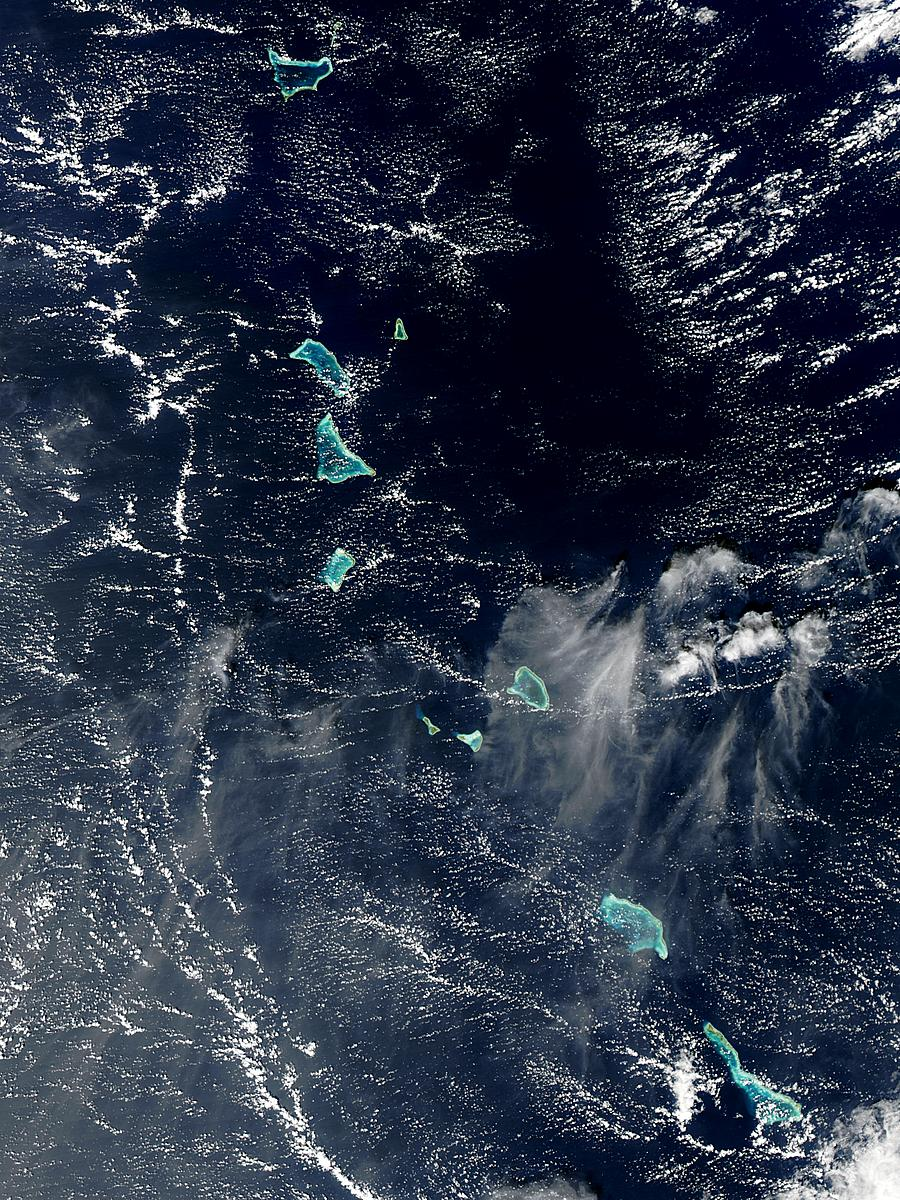
Kiribati's Gilbert Islands

The total land area mass total 811 km^{2} (313 sq mi). It includes three island groups - Gilbert Islands, Line Islands, Phoenix Islands. Most of the land on these islands is less than two metres above sea level. Including the amount of water, the total water and land area is 2485 square miles. A 1989 United Nations report identified Kiribati as one of the countries that could completely disappear in the 21st century if steps are not taken to address global climate change.

The coastline of the islands total 1,143 km (710 mi) in length. Kiribati has the 12th largest exclusive economic zone of 3,441,810 km^{2} (1,328,890 mi^{2}) (200 nautical miles). The islands are relatively flat and very spread out. The highest point, on Banaba Island, is 265 feet above sea level.

=== Climate ===
Due to its location, Kiribati exhibits a maritime climate. Temperatures range between 26 and 32 °C year-round, with the water temperature sitting on a comfortable year-round 28-29 °C. The dry season is from December to March while the wet season last from February to May and from September to November. In the driest years, the islands have received 150mm of rainfall while its wettest years have seen upwards of 4000mm.

Climate data for Tarawa (Köppen Af)
Month	Jan	Feb	Mar	Apr	May	Jun	Jul	Aug	Sep	Oct	Nov	Dec	Year
Record high °C (°F)	35.0 (95.0)	33.0 (91.4)	35.0 (95.0)	34.5 (94.1)	34.5 (94.1)	33.5 (92.3)	34.5 (94.1)	34.5 (94.1)	34.5 (94.1)	35.0 (95.0)	35.0 (95.0)	35.0 (95.0)	35.0 (95.0)
Mean daily maximum °C (°F)	30.7 (87.3)	30.6 (87.1)	30.7 (87.3)	30.7 (87.3)	30.8 (87.4)	30.8 (87.4)	30.9 (87.6)	31.0 (87.8)	31.1 (88.0)	31.2 (88.2)	31.3 (88.3)	30.9 (87.6)	30.9 (87.6)
Daily mean °C (°F)	28.2 (82.8)	28.1 (82.6)	28.1 (82.6)	28.2 (82.8)	28.4 (83.1)	28.3 (82.9)	28.2 (82.8)	28.3 (82.9)	28.4 (83.1)	28.6 (83.5)	28.5 (83.3)	28.2 (82.8)	28.3 (82.9)
Mean daily minimum °C (°F)	25.3 (77.5)	25.3 (77.5)	25.2 (77.4)	25.3 (77.5)	25.5 (77.9)	25.3 (77.5)	25.1 (77.2)	25.2 (77.4)	25.3 (77.5)	25.4 (77.7)	25.4 (77.7)	25.3 (77.5)	25.3 (77.5)
Record low °C (°F)	21.5 (70.7)	22.5 (72.5)	22.5 (72.5)	22.5 (72.5)	21.0 (69.8)	21.0 (69.8)	21.0 (69.8)	21.5 (70.7)	22.5 (72.5)	22.0 (71.6)	22.5 (72.5)	22.0 (71.6)	21.0 (69.8)
Average precipitation mm (inches)	271 (10.7)	218 (8.6)	204 (8.0)	184 (7.2)	158 (6.2)	155 (6.1)	168 (6.6)	138 (5.4)	120 (4.7)	110 (4.3)	115 (4.5)	212 (8.3)	2,052 (80.8)
Average precipitation days (≥ 0.3 mm)	15	12	14	15	15	14	16	18	15	11	10	17	172
Average relative humidity (%)	81	80	81	82	81	81	80	79	77	77	79	81	80
Mean monthly sunshine hours	220.1	192.1	207.7	201.0	229.4	219.0	229.4	257.3	243.0	260.4	240.0	189.1	2,688.5
Mean daily sunshine hours	7.1	6.8	6.7	6.7	7.4	7.3	7.4	8.3	8.1	8.4	8.0	6.1	7.4
Source: Deutscher Wetterdienst

Climate data for Kiritimati (Köppen BSh)
Month	Jan	Feb	Mar	Apr	May	Jun	Jul	Aug	Sep	Oct	Nov	Dec	Year
Record high °C (°F)	32 (89)	33 (91)	33 (92)	33 (92)	34 (93)	32 (90)	32 (90)	33 (91)	33 (91)	33 (92)	33 (92)	33 (91)	34 (93)
Mean daily maximum °C (°F)	29 (85)	29 (85)	30 (86)	30 (86)	31 (87)	31 (87)	30 (86)	31 (87)	31 (87)	31 (87)	30 (86)	30 (86)	30 (86)
Daily mean °C (°F)	27 (80)	27 (80)	27 (81)	27 (81)	27 (81)	27 (81)	27 (81)	28 (82)	27 (81)	27 (81)	27 (81)	27 (80)	27 (81)
Mean daily minimum °C (°F)	24 (75)	24 (75)	24 (76)	24 (76)	24 (76)	24 (76)	24 (76)	25 (77)	24 (76)	24 (75)	24 (76)	24 (75)	24 (76)
Record low °C (°F)	19 (66)	22 (71)	22 (71)	21 (70)	23 (73)	20 (68)	22 (72)	22 (71)	21 (69)	20 (68)	19 (67)	21 (69)	19 (66)
Average precipitation mm (inches)	25 (1.0)	71 (2.8)	64 (2.5)	210 (8.1)	89 (3.5)	81 (3.2)	51 (2.0)	15 (0.6)	2.5 (0.1)	2.5 (0.1)	7.6 (0.3)	15 (0.6)	633.6 (24.8)
Average precipitation days	2.4	4.6	6.0	13.8	6.8	6.1	3.0	1.8	0.1	0.3	0.7	1.7	47.3
Average relative humidity (%)	77	80	80	83	81	80	78	75	74	74	73	75	78
Source: Weatherbase

=== Land use ===
The amount of arable land is at 2.5%. Crop usage stands at about 40% of the available land. A few trees exist and occupy 10% of the land. About 50% of the land is used for housing and commercial use.

=== Natural environment ===
==== Ecoregions ====
Kiribati is part of three terrestrial ecoregions:

- the Line Islands are in the Central Polynesian tropical moist forests ecoregion
- the Phoenix Islands are in the Western Polynesian tropical moist forests ecoregion
- the Gilbert islands and Banaba are in the Eastern Micronesia tropical moist forests ecoregion

==== Natural resources ====
Much of the natural resources have been exhausted before its 1979 independence. On the island of Banaba, the British mined guano for phosphorus, until exhaustion of supply, an event that was before independence.

==== Natural hazards ====
Cyclones can occur any time, but usually November to March; occasional tornadoes; low level of some of the islands make them very sensitive to changes in sea level. The Climate Change in the Pacific Report (2011) describes Kiribati as having a low risk of cyclones; however in March 2015 Kiribati experienced flooding and destruction of seawalls and coastal infrastructure as the result of Cyclone Pam, a Category 5 cyclone that devastated Vanuatu.

==== Pollution ====
The island of Banaba has suffered greatly from the after effects of the massive phosphorus mining. Most of the population were forced to evacuate to the island country of Fiji due to its effects. In addition, the atoll near the island of Tarawa is vulnerable to the effects of solid waste disposal. A report by the United Nations say the wildlife from the region are endangered. The islands are very sensitive to the damaging effects.

=== International conventions ===
The country signed the Convention on Diversity on 6 August 1994.

It also signed conventions on the Climate Change-Kyoto Protocol, Desertification, Hazardous Wastes, Law of the Sea, Marine Dumping, Ozone Layer Protection.

=== Protected area ===
Kiribati's territorial waters (EEZ)

The Phoenix Islands Protected Area constitutes 11.34% of Kiribati's Exclusive Economic Zone (EEZ) with a size of 408,250 km^{2} (157,630 sq mi). This is the second largest marine protected area (MPA) in the Pacific Ocean.

=== Additional notes ===
21 of the 33 islands are inhabited.

Banaba (Ocean Island) in Kiribati is one of the three great phosphate rock islands in the Pacific Ocean.

Kiribati is the only country in the world whose land exists in all four hemispheres.

== Extreme points ==
This is a list of the extreme points of Kiribati, the points that are farther north, south, east or west than any other location.

- Northernmost point – Teraina (Washington Island), Line Islands
- Easternmost point – Caroline Island, Line Islands
- Southernmost point – Flint Island, Line Islands
- Westernmost point - Banaba Island
