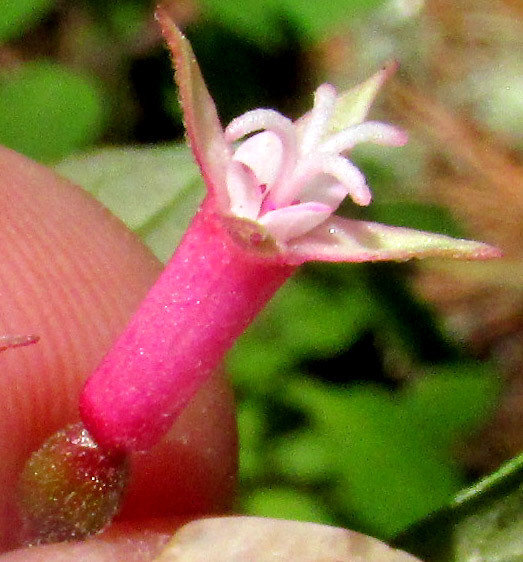

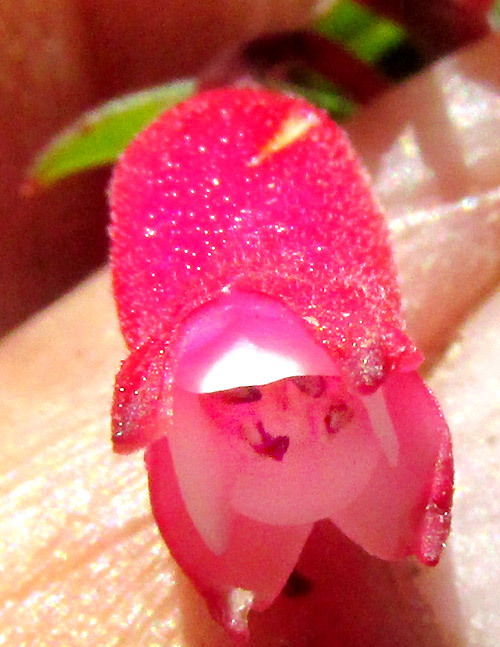
- Female flower (top) and male flower (bottom)

Scientific classification
- Kingdom: Plantae
- Clade: Tracheophytes
- Clade: Angiosperms
- Clade: Eudicots
- Clade: Rosids
- Order: Myrtales
- Family: Onagraceae
- Genus: Fuchsia
- Species: F. encliandra

Binomial name
- Fuchsia encliandra (Zucc.) Steud. (1840)

Synonyms
- Encliandra parviflora Zucc. (1837); Fuchsia parviflora Zucc. (Zucc.) Hemsl. (1878)

= Fuchsia encliandra =

Shrub species of Fuchsia

Fuchsia encliandra is a species of shrub that grows up to 2 meters (6½ feet) tall. Simple leaves with smooth edges arise opposite one another at stem nodes. Flowers are either male or female, sometimes plants bearing flowers of only one sex, but other times the sexes mixed on one plant -- they are "subdioecious." It occurs from central Mexico south into Nicaragua. The species grows in the mountains, primarily in the seasonally dry tropical type of biome.

== Taxonomy ==
Three subspecies are recognized for the species. Subspecies encliandra is common in Mexico's mountain forests of pine, oak and arbutus from the states of Jalisco and San Luis Potosí south to central Oaxaca.

Subspecies microphylloides is abundant in wet pine-oak forests and cloud forests along mountain crests in Guerrero, Michoacán and Oaxaca.

Subspecies tetradactyla is locally abundant but in scattered communities in forests of pine, oak and arbutus from central Chiapas in southern Mexico south into northern Nicaragua.
