= Seasonal tropical forest =

Type of tropical forest

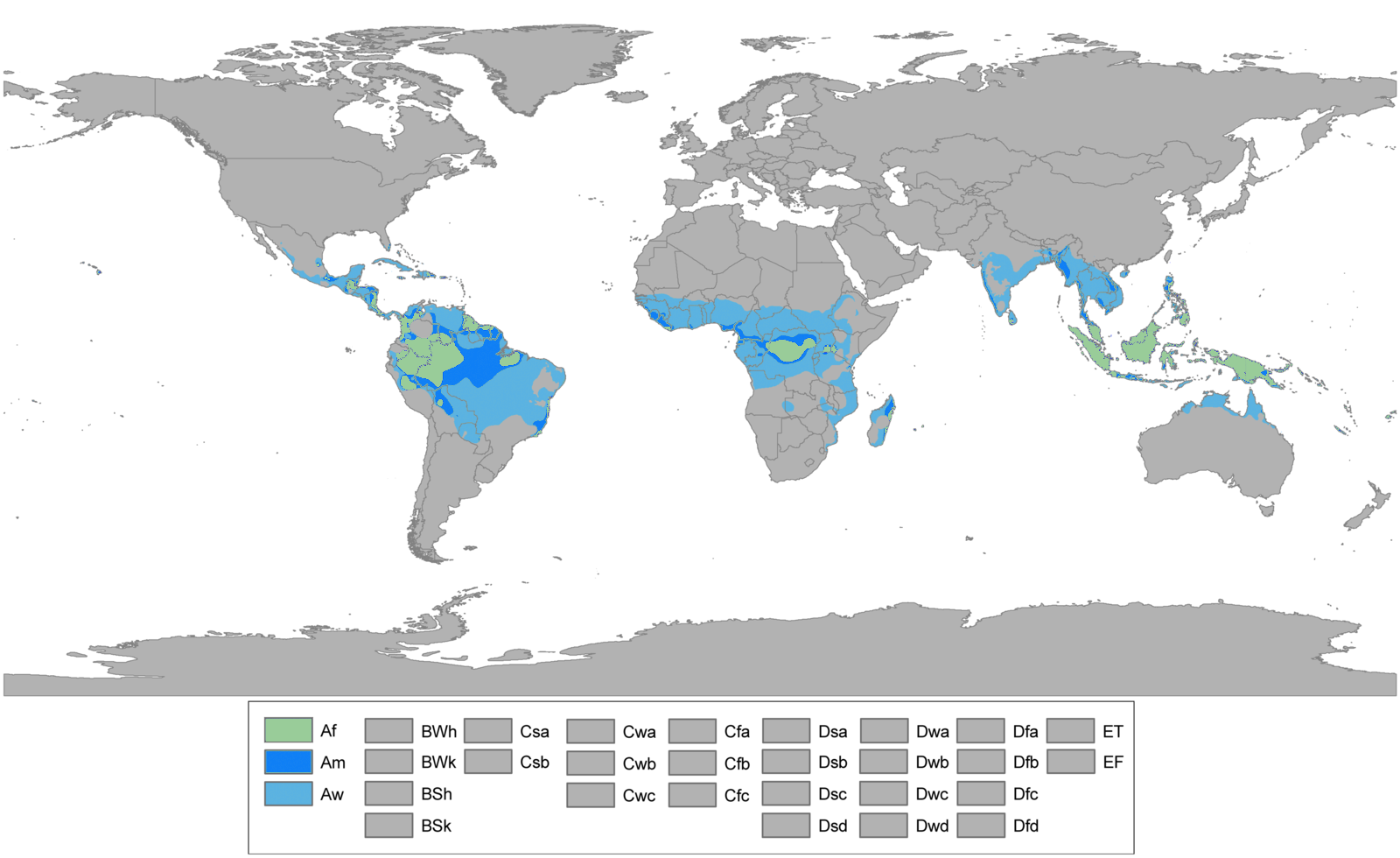
Tropical seasonal climate sub-types: Am—Tropical monsoon climate. Aw/As—Tropical savanna climate. (note: Af in light green is Tropical rainforest)

Seasonal tropical forest, also known as moist deciduous, semi-evergreen seasonal, tropical mixed or monsoon forest, is a type of tropical forest that typically contains a range of tree species, only some of which drop some or all of their leaves during the dry season. This classified under the Walter system as (i) tropical climate with high overall rainfall (typically in the 1000–2500 mm range; 39–98 inches) and (ii) having a very distinct wet season with (an often cooler "winter") dry season. These forests represent a range of habitats influenced by monsoon (Am) or tropical wet savanna (Aw/As) climates (as in the Köppen climate classification). Drier forests in the Aw/As climate zone are typically deciduous and placed in the Tropical dry forest biome: with further transitional zones (ecotones) of savannah woodland then tropical and subtropical grasslands, savannas, and shrublands.

== Distribution ==
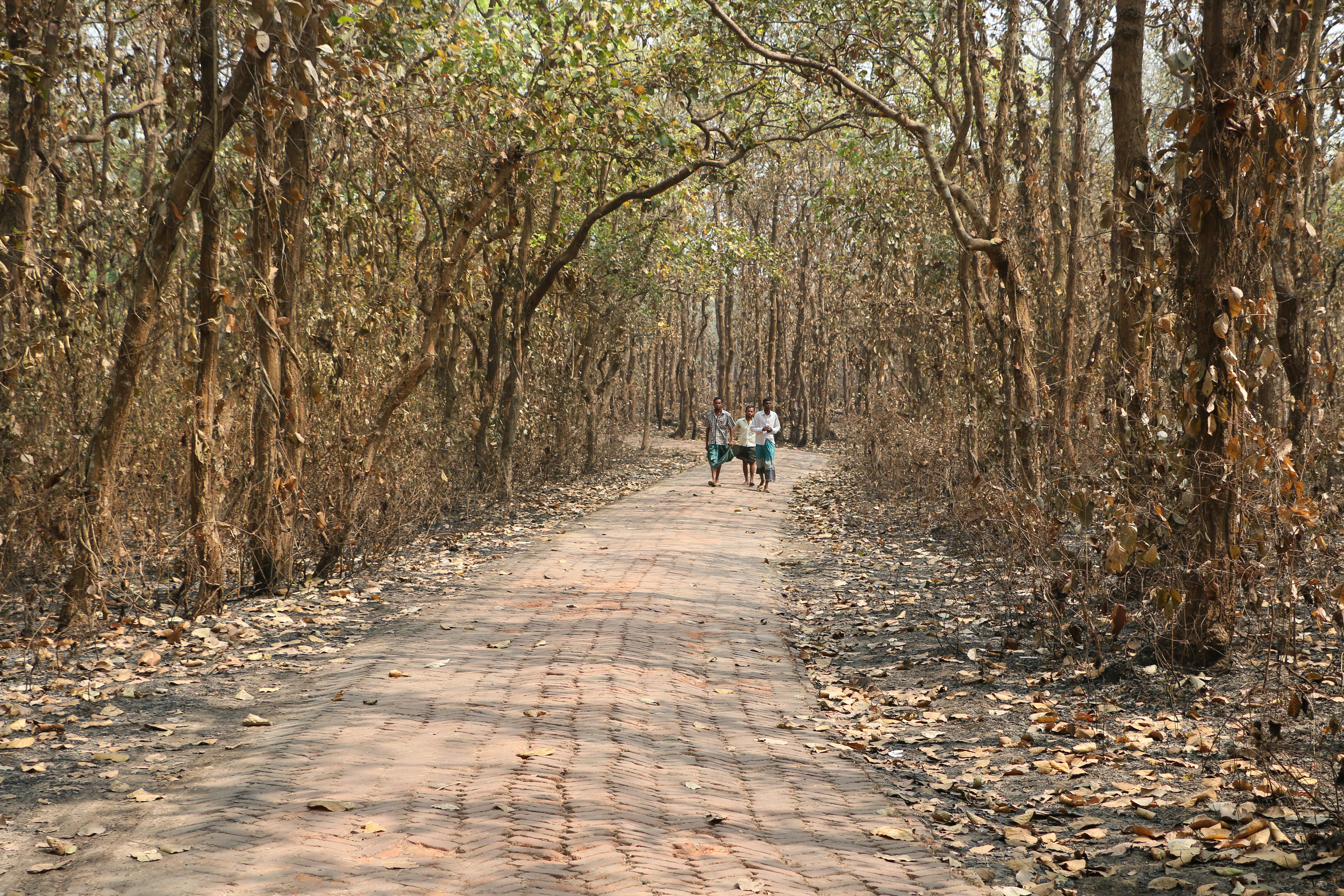
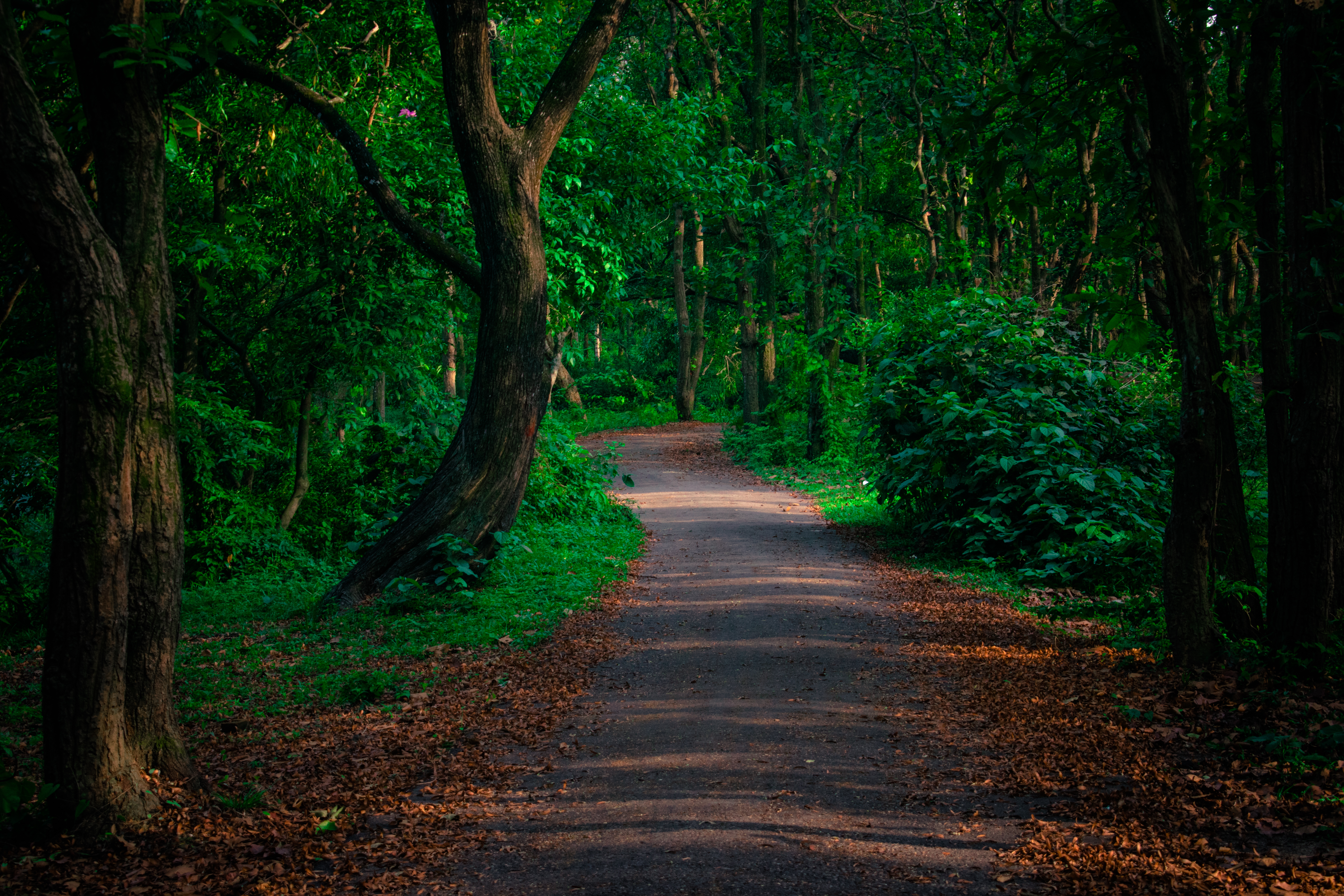
Extreme differences are very much evident between the wet and dry seasons in a tropical seasonal forest. The image to the left shows Bhawal National Park in central Bangladesh during the dry season, while the image to the right depicts the same area during monsoon season.

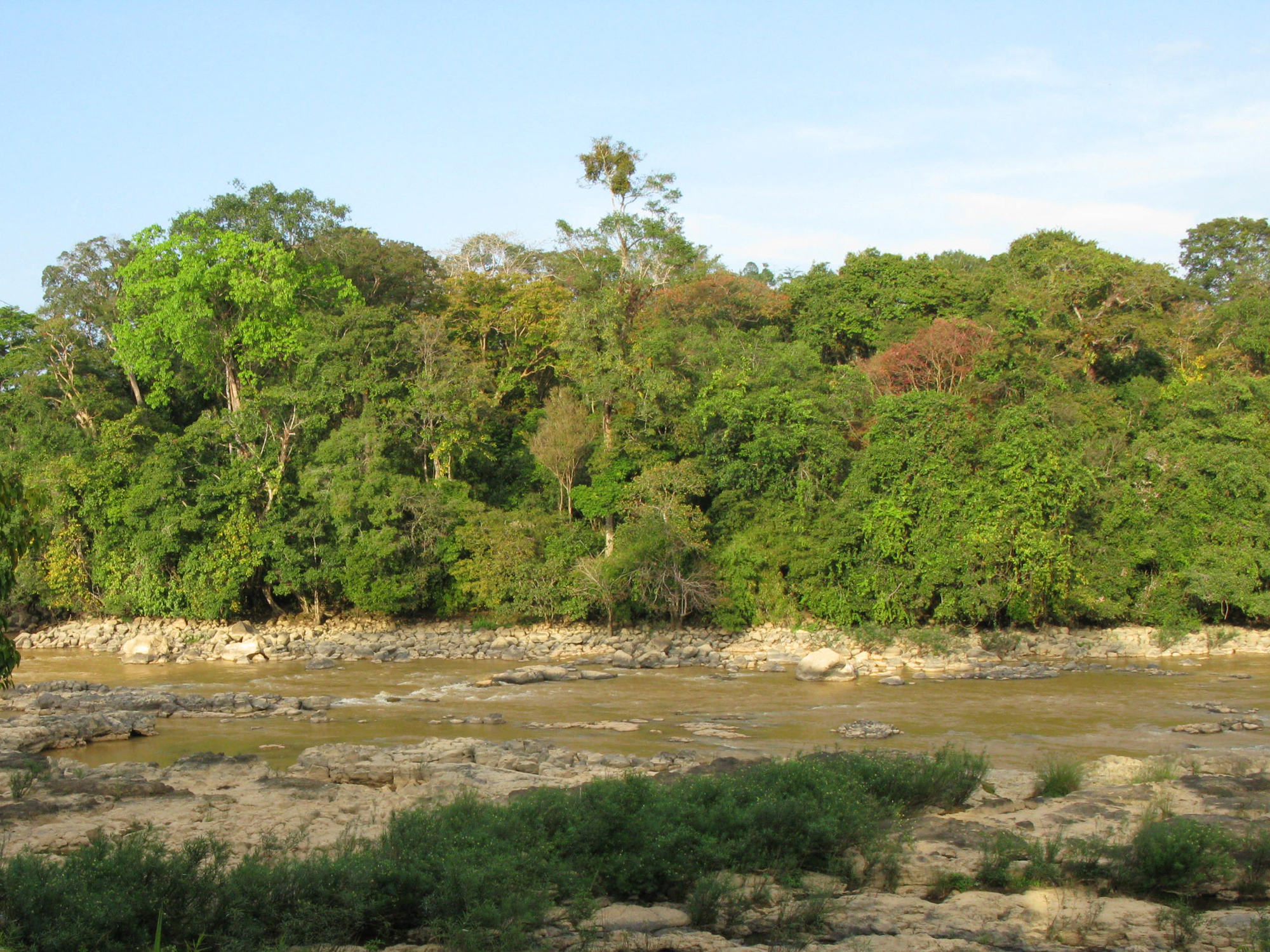
Trees at Cat Tien National Park: showing seasonal forest structure in the early dry season (December)

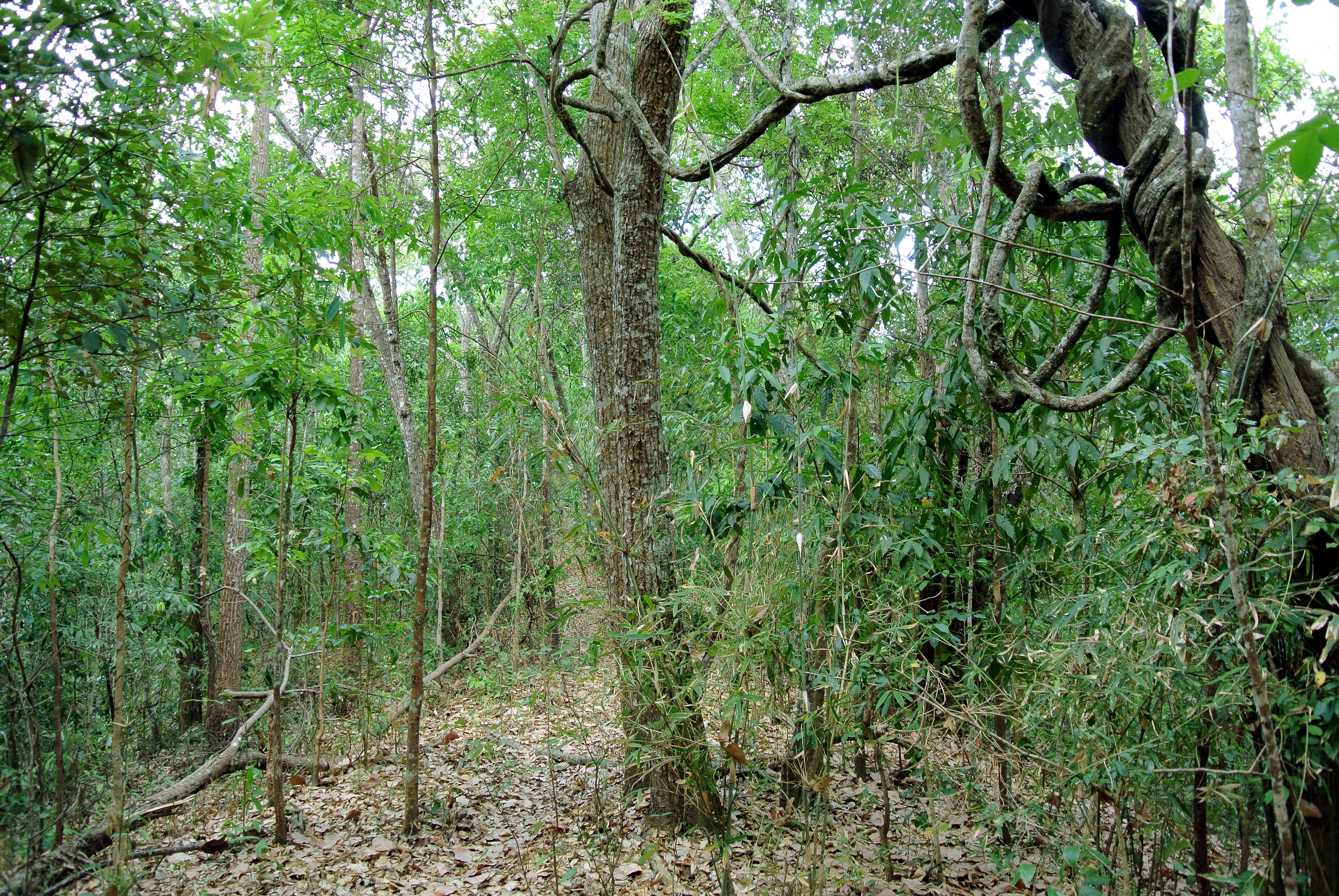
Seasonal forest in Northern Thailand

Seasonal (mixed) tropical forests can be found in many parts of the tropical zone, with examples found in:

- In the Asia-Pacific region: seasonal forests predominate across large areas of the Eastern Java, Wallacea, Indian subcontinent and Indochina
  - Eastern Java monsoon forests
  - Wallacea Forest
  - Margalla Hills
  - Himalayan subtropical broadleaf forests
  - Brahmaputra Valley semi-evergreen forests
  - Upper Gangetic Plains moist deciduous forests
  - Mondulkiri Province, Cambodia
  - Cat Tien National Park, Vietnam
  - Khao Yai National Park and Huai Kha Khaeng Wildlife Sanctuary, Thailand
  - Northern Australia: Cape York Peninsula (Queensland), Arnhem Land (Northern Territory), The Kimberly (Western Australia)

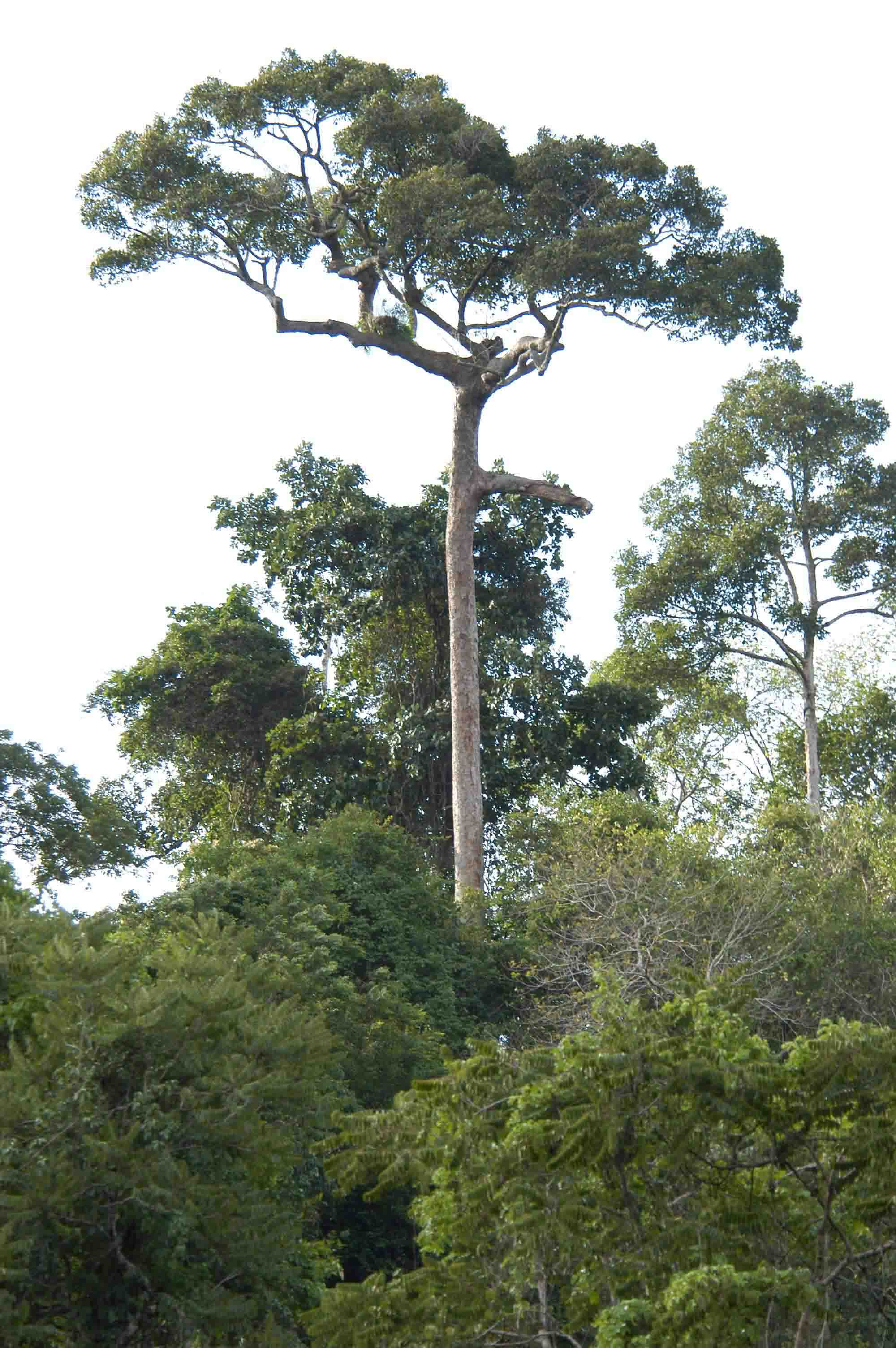
Emergent tree rising above the main canopy in Khao Yai National Park forest

- In the Americas
  - Atlantic forests of Brazil
  - Central and eastern Panama: with Barro Colorado Island especially well studied
- In Africa
  - Coastal West Africa: Guinean seasonal forest: from south-western Gambia to eastern Ghana

== Climate ==
The climate of seasonal forests is typically controlled by a system called the Intertropical Convergence Zone (ITCZ), located near the equator and created by the convergence of the trade winds from the Northern and Southern Hemispheres. The position of these bands vary seasonally, moving north in the northern summer and south in the northern winter, and ultimately controlling the wet and dry seasons in the tropics. These regions appear to have experienced strong warming, at a mean rate of 0.26 degrees Celsius per decade, which coincides with a global rise in temperature resulting from the anthropocentric inputs of greenhouse gases into the atmosphere. Studies have also found that precipitation has declined and tropical Asia has experienced an increase in dry season intensity whereas Amazonian has no significant pattern change in precipitation or dry season. Additionally, El Niño-Southern Oscillation (ENSO) events drive the inter-annual climatic variability in temperature and precipitation and result in drought and increased intensity of the dry season. As anthropogenic warming increases the intensity and frequency of ENSO will increase, rendering tropical rainforest regions susceptible to stress and increased mortality of trees and other plants.

Onset dates and prevailing wind currents of the southwest summer monsoon.

== Structure ==
As with tropical rainforests there are different canopy layers, but these may be less pronounced in mixed forests, which are often characterised by numerous lianas due to their growth advantage during the dry season. The colloquial term jungle, derived from the Sanskrit word for "forest", has no specific ecological meaning but originally referred to this type of primary and especially secondary forest in the Indian subcontinent. Determining which strands of mixed forest are primary and secondary can also be problematic, since the species mixture is influenced by factors such as soil depth and climate, as well as human interference.

== Characteristic biology ==
The fauna and flora of seasonal tropical mixed forest are usually distinctive. Examples of the biodiversity and habitat type are often well described for National Parks in:

- Africa represented by:
  - the northern part of Korup National Park in Cameroon (central region)

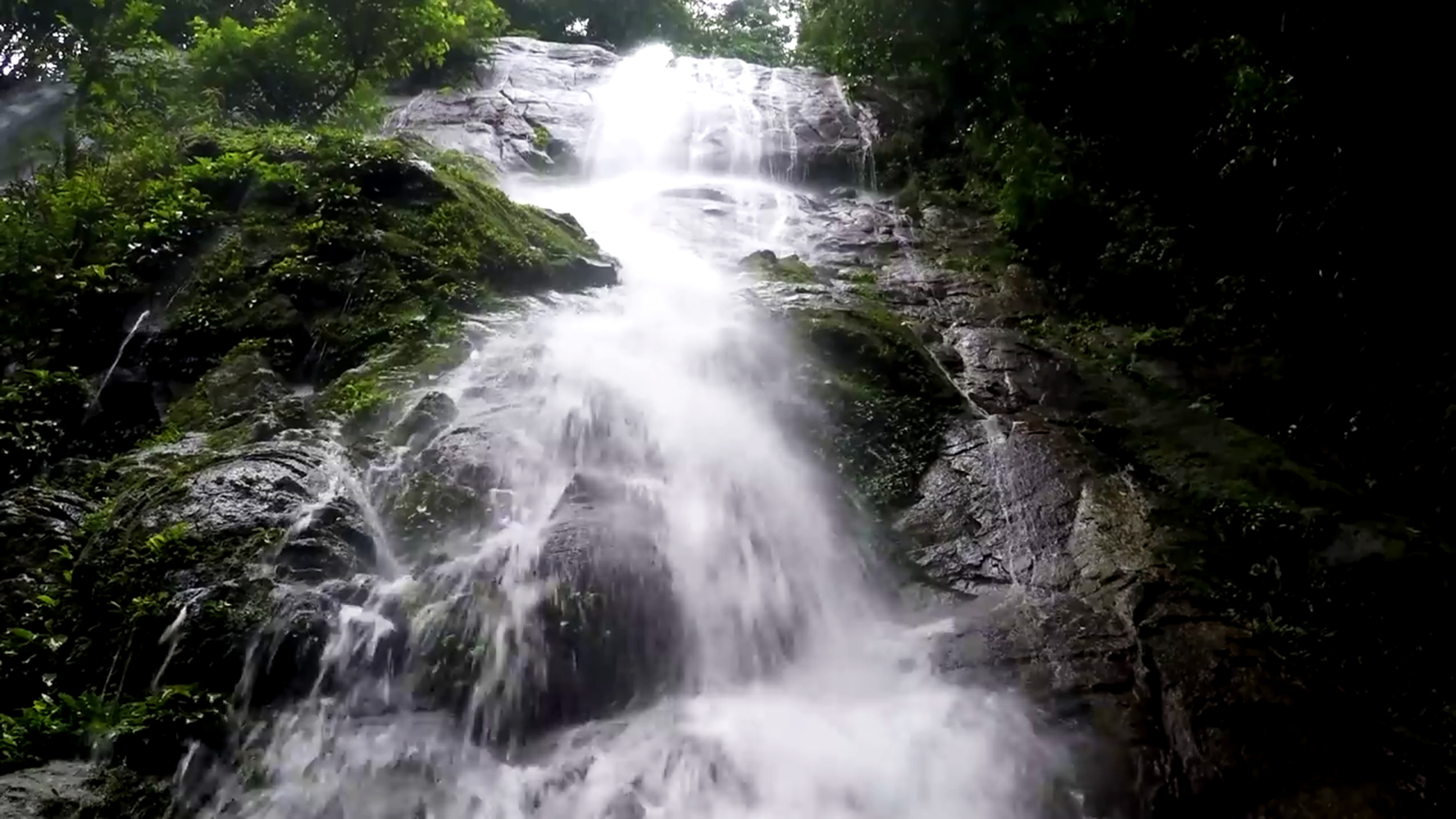
Falling Waters in Korup National Park

  - the Upper Guinean forests (West Africa)
- Asia represented by Cat Tien National Park and Huai Kha Khaeng in the (Indochina region)
- Pacific region: including the Queensland forest reserves
- Central American wildlife is well represented in:
  - Costa Rica e.g. Corcovado National Park
  - the Soberanía National Park in Panama.
- South American flora listed and represented in Rio Doce State Park

== See also ==
- International Tropical Timber Organization (ITTO)
- List of tropical and subtropical moist broadleaf forests ecoregions
- Trees of the world
- Tropical dry forest
- Tropical rainforest
- Tropical vegetation
