= Oceanian realm =

Terrestrial biogeographic realm

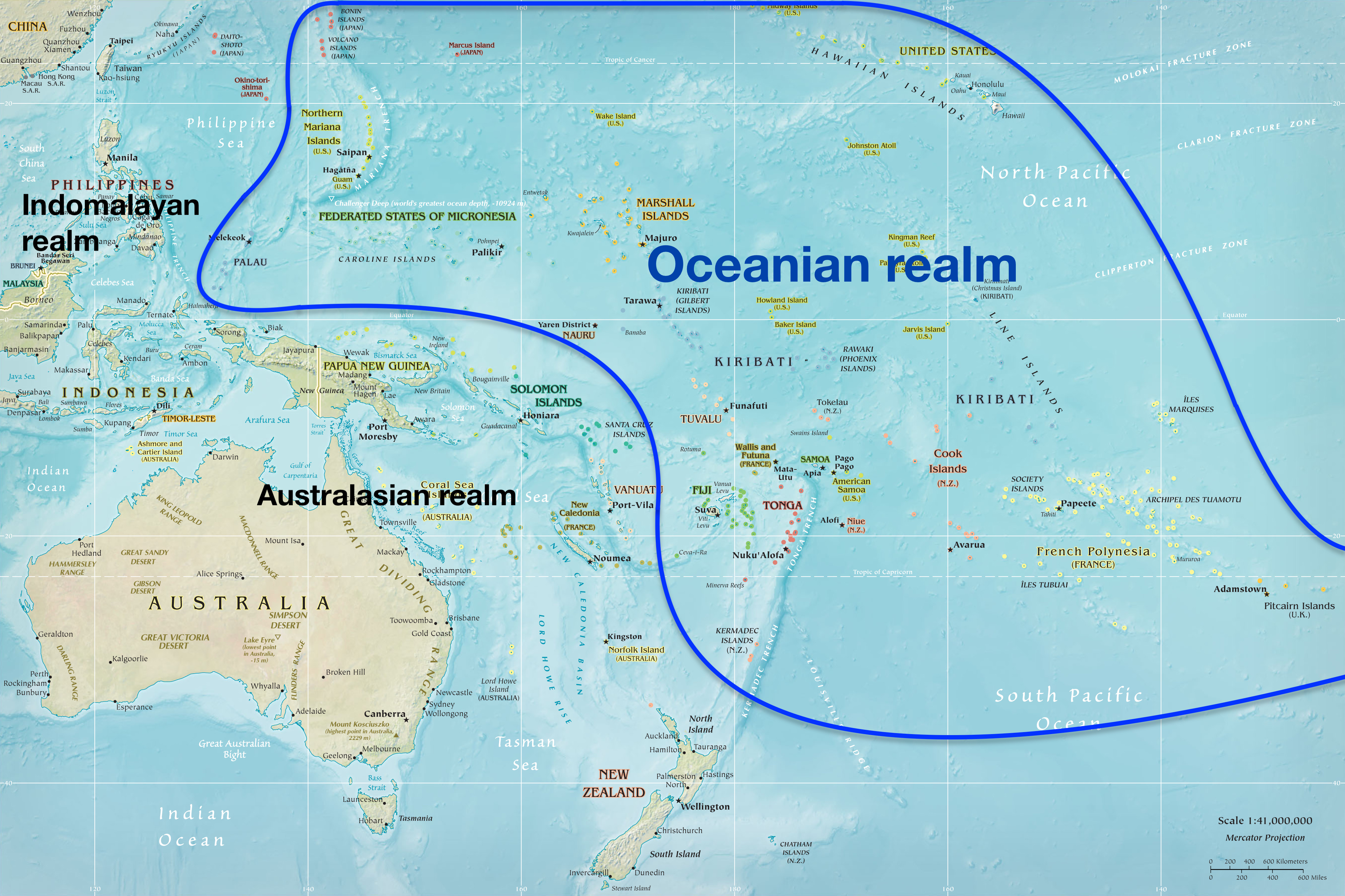
Map of Oceanian realm. It extends further east to include Rapa Nui and Sala y Gomez.

The Oceanian realm is one of the eight biogeographic realms and is unique in not including any continental land mass. It has the smallest land area of any of the WWF realms.

This realm includes the islands of the Pacific Ocean in Micronesia, the Fijian Islands, the Hawaiian Islands, and Polynesia (with the exception of New Zealand). New Zealand, Australia, and most of Melanesia including New Guinea, Vanuatu, the Solomon Islands, and New Caledonia are included within the Australasian realm.

Conversely, New Guinea, New Caledonia, the Solomon Islands and New Zealand are included in the Oceanian realm in the classification scheme developed by Miklos Udvardy in 1975.

The Juan Fernández Islands have been included in both the Oceanian and Temperate South American realms. Despite only being a few hundred miles removed from the South American coast, the islands have strong Hawaiian and southeast Polynesian biogeographic influences, and the presence of an endemic insect and plant family. The uninhabited French territory of Clipperton Island, 1,000 kilometers off the coast of Mexico, has also been associated with the realm.

== Geology ==
Oceania is geologically the youngest realm. While other realms include old continental land masses or fragments of continents, Oceania is composed mostly of volcanic high islands and coral atolls that arose from the sea in geologically recent times, many of them in the Pleistocene. They were created either by hotspot volcanism, or as island arcs pushed upward by the collision and subduction of tectonic plates. The islands range from tiny islets, sea stacks and coral atolls to large mountainous islands, like Hawaii and Fiji.

== Climate ==
The climate of Oceania's islands is tropical or subtropical, and range from humid to seasonally dry. Wetter parts of the islands are covered by tropical and subtropical moist broadleaf forests, while the drier parts of the islands, including the leeward sides of the islands and many of the low coral islands, are covered by tropical and subtropical dry broadleaf forests and Tropical and subtropical grasslands, savannas, and shrublands. Hawaii's high volcanoes, Mauna Kea and Mauna Loa, are home to some rare tropical montane grasslands and shrublands.

== Flora and fauna ==
Since the islands of Oceania were never connected by land to a continent, the flora and fauna of the islands originally reached them from across the ocean (though at the height of the last ice age sea levels were much lower than today and many current seamounts were islands, so some now isolated islands were once less isolated). Once they reached the islands, the ancestors of Oceania's present flora and fauna adapted to life on the islands.

Larger islands with diverse ecological niches encouraged floral and faunal adaptive radiation, whereby multiple species evolved from a common ancestor, each species adapted to a different ecological niche; the various species of Hawaiian honeycreepers (Family Drepanididae) are a classic example. Other adaptations to island ecologies include gigantism, dwarfism, and among birds, loss of flight. Oceania has a number of endemic species; Hawaii in particular is considered a global center of endemism, with its forest ecoregions having one of the highest percentages of endemic plants in the world.

=== Flora ===
Land plants disperse by several different means. Many plants, mostly ferns and mosses but also some flowering plants, disperse on the wind, relying on tiny spores or feathery seeds that can remain airborne over long distances notably Metrosideros trees from New Zealand spread on the wind across Oceania. Other plants, notably coconut palms and mangroves, produce seeds that can float in salt water over long distances, eventually washing up on distant beaches, and thus Cocos trees are ubiquitous across Oceania. Birds are also an important means of dispersal; some plants produce sticky seeds that are carried on the feet or feathers of birds, and many plants produce fruits with seeds that can pass through the digestive tracts of birds. Pandanus trees are fairly ubiquitous across Oceania.

Botanists generally agree that much of the flora of Oceania is derived from the Malesian Flora of the Malay Peninsula, Indonesia, the Philippines, and New Guinea, with some plants from Australasia and a few from the Americas, particularly in Hawaii. Easter Island has some plants from South America such as the totora reed.

=== Fauna ===
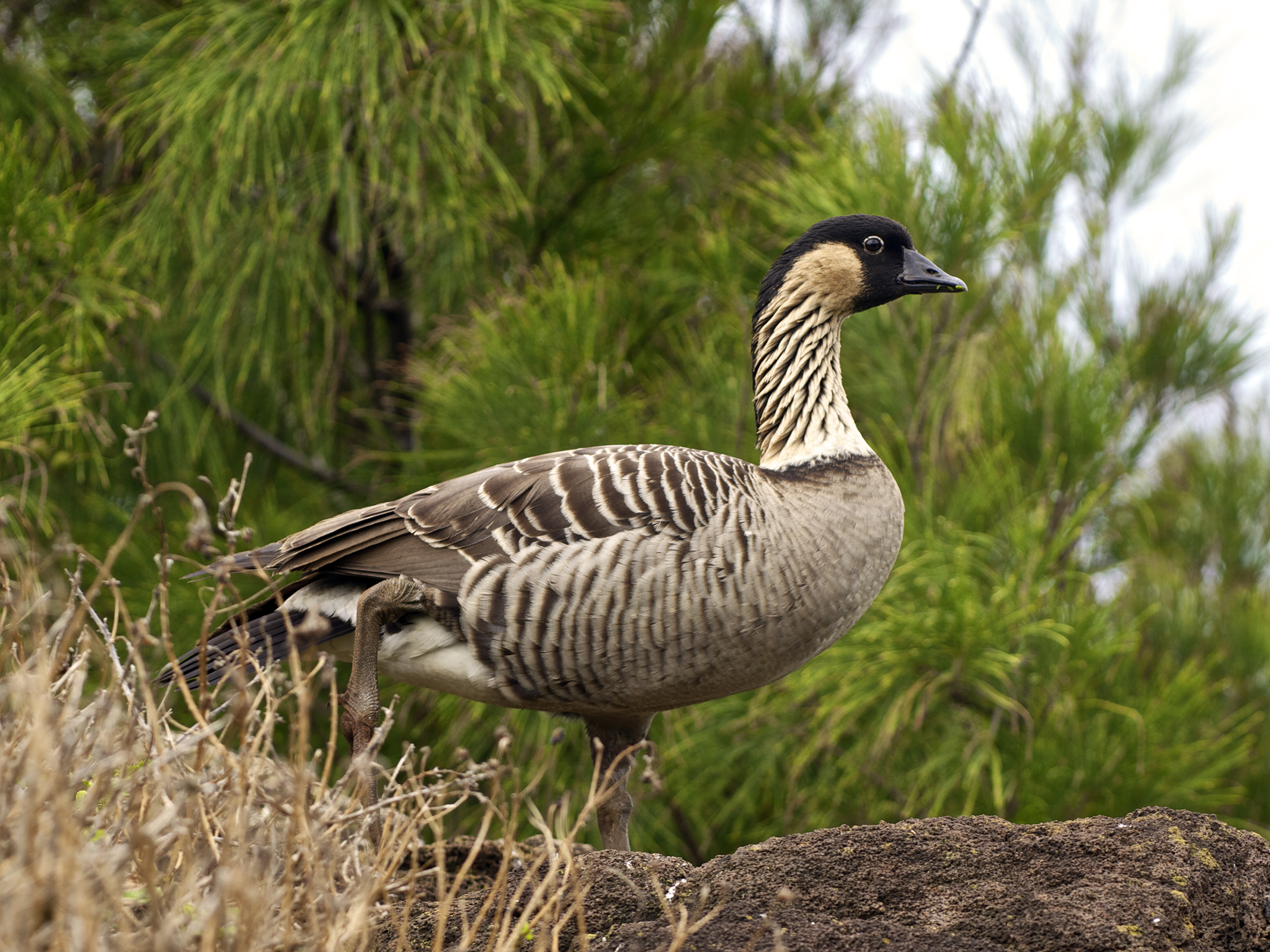
Nene (Branta sandvicensis), a native goose from Hawaii

Dispersal across the ocean is difficult for most land animals, and Oceania has relatively few indigenous land animals compared to other realms. Certain types of animals that are ecologically important on the continental realms, like large land predators and grazing mammals, were entirely absent from the islands of Oceania until humans brought them. Birds are relatively common, including many seabirds and some species of land birds whose ancestors may have been blown out to sea by storms. Some birds evolved into flightless species after their ancestors arrived, including several species of rails. A number of islands have indigenous lizards, including geckoes and skinks, whose ancestors probably arrived on floating rafts of vegetation washed out to sea by storms. With the exception of bats, which live on most of the island groups, there are few if any indigenous non-marine mammals in Oceania.

== Impact of settlement ==
Many animal and plant species have been introduced by humans in two main waves.

Malayo-Polynesian settlers brought pigs, dogs, chickens and polynesian rats to many islands; and had spread across the whole of Oceania by 1200 CE. From the seventeenth century onwards European settlers brought other animals, including cats, cattle, horses, small Asian mongoose (Herpestes javanicus), sheep, goats, and the brown rat (Rattus norvegicus). These and other introduced species, in addition to overhunting and deforestation, have dramatically altered the ecology of many of Oceania's islands, pushing many species to extinction or near-extinction, or confining them to small islets uninhabited by humans.

The absence of predator species caused many bird species to lose the instinct to flee from predators and to lay their eggs on the ground, which makes them vulnerable to predators such as cats, dogs, mongooses or rats. The arrival of humans on these island groups often resulted in disruption of the indigenous ecosystems and waves of species extinctions (see Holocene extinction event). Easter Island, the easternmost island in Polynesia, shows evidence of ecosystem collapse, probably caused by human activity, several hundred years ago, which contributed (along with slave raiding and European diseases) to a 99% decline in the human population of the island. The island, once lushly forested, is now mostly windswept grassland. More recently, Guam's native bird and lizard species were decimated after the introduction of the brown tree snake (Boiga irregularis) in the 1940s.

== Ecoregions ==
Ecoregions of the Oceanian realm. OC0101: Carolines tropical moist forests; OC0102: Central Polynesian tropical moist forests; OC0103: Cook Islands tropical moist forests; OC0104: Eastern Micronesia tropical moist forests; OC0105: Fiji tropical moist forests; OC0106: Hawaiian tropical rainforests; OC0107: Kermadec Islands subtropical moist forests; OC0108: Marquesas tropical moist forests; OC0109: Ogasawara subtropical moist forests; OC0110: Palau tropical moist forests; OC0111: Rapa Nui and Sala-y-Gomez tropical broadleaf forests; OC0112: Samoan tropical moist forests; OC0113: Society Islands tropical moist forests; OC0114: Tongan tropical moist forests; OC0115: Tuamotu tropical moist forests; OC0116: Tubuai tropical moist forests; OC0117: Western Polynesian tropical moist forests; OC0201: Fiji tropical dry forests; OC0202: Hawaiian tropical dry forests; OC0203: Marianas tropical dry forests; OC0204: Yap tropical dry forests; OC0701: Hawaiian tropical high shrublands; OC0702: Hawaiian tropical low shrublands; OC0703: Northwestern Hawaii scrub.

Oceanian tropical and subtropical moist broadleaf forests ecoregions
Carolines tropical moist forests	Federated States of Micronesia
Central Polynesian tropical moist forests	Cook Islands, Jarvis Island, Johnston Atoll, Kiribati, Palmyra Atoll
Cook Islands tropical moist forests	Cook Islands
Eastern Micronesia tropical moist forests	Kiribati, Marshall Islands, Nauru, Wake Island
Fiji tropical moist forests	Fiji, Wallis and Futuna
Hawaiian tropical rainforests	Hawaiʻi
Kermadec Islands subtropical moist forests	New Zealand
Marquesas tropical moist forests	French Polynesia
Ogasawara subtropical moist forests	Bonin Islands (Japan)
Palau tropical moist forests	Palau
Rapa Nui and Sala-y-Gomez tropical broadleaf forests	Easter Island (Chile)
Samoan tropical moist forests	American Samoa, Samoa
Society Islands tropical moist forests	French Polynesia
Tongan tropical moist forests	Niue, Tonga
Tuamotu tropical moist forests	French Polynesia, Pitcairn Islands
Tubuai tropical moist forests	French Polynesia
Western Polynesian tropical moist forests	Baker Island, Howland Island, Kiribati, Swains Island, Tokelau, Tuvalu

Oceanian tropical and subtropical dry broadleaf forests ecoregions
Fiji tropical dry forests	Fiji
Hawaiian tropical dry forests	Hawaiʻi
Marianas tropical dry forests	Guam, Northern Mariana Islands
Yap tropical dry forests	Federated States of Micronesia
