= Palau tropical moist forests =

Ecoregion in Micronesia

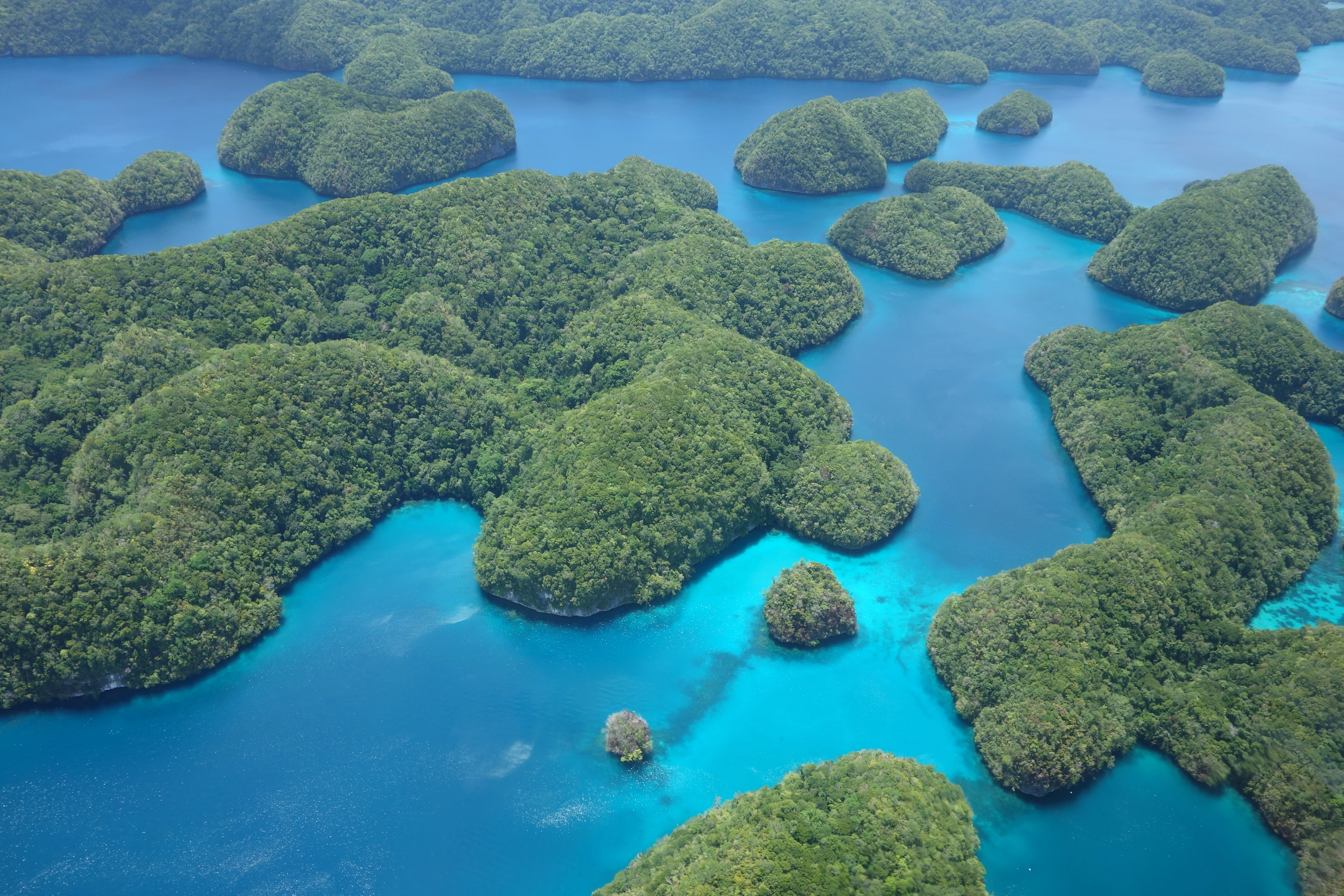
- Rock Islands of Palau

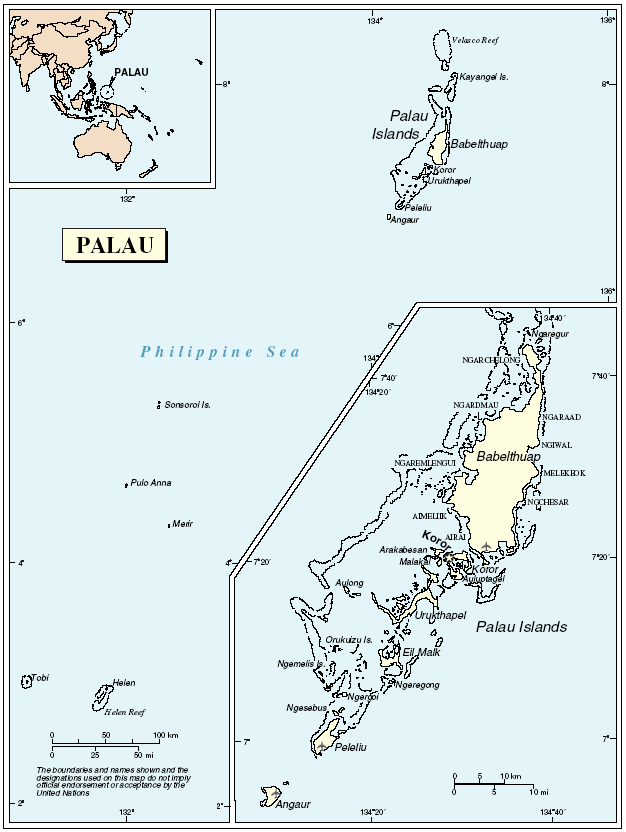
- Map of Palau

Ecology
- Realm: Oceanian
- Biome: tropical and subtropical moist broadleaf forests

Geography
- Area: 463 km^{2} (179 sq mi)
- Country: Palau

Conservation
- Conservation status: Critical/endangered
- Global 200: South Pacific Islands forests
- Protected: 24.7%

The Palau tropical moist forests is a tropical and subtropical moist broadleaf forests ecoregion in Micronesia. It encompasses the nation of Palau.

== Geography ==
The Palau Islands are an archipelago approximately 200 km in length, located 800 km north of the equator and 800 km east of the Philippines. Kayangel is the northernmost island in the archipelago, and the island of Angaur is the southernmost. Babeldaob, or Babelthaup, is the largest island (376 km^{2}) in the archipelago, and is 70% of the ecoregion's land area. Much of the archipelago is enclosed in a barrier reef.

Some islands, including Babeldaob and Koror, have a core of weathered volcanic rock. Much of the archipelago is composed of uplifted marine limestone, which has eroded into dramatic karstic landscapes.

The ecoregion also includes some outlying atolls stretching southwest of the Palau Islands, including The Sonsorol islands (Fanna, Sonsorol, Pulo Anna, and Merir), Tobi, and Helen.

== Climate ==
The ecoregion has a humid tropical climate. The mean annual temperature in the capital city of Koror is 27º C, and the mean annual rainfall averages 3,730 mm. Rainfall is plentiful year-round, with more during the May through November summer rainy season, and less between February and April.

== Flora ==
The natural vegetation consists mostly of tropical moist broadleaf forests. The forests include eight main types – upland forest on the high volcanic islands, swamp forest, mangrove forest, atoll forest, casuarina forest, limestone forest, plantation forest, and palm forest.

The forests on much of Babeldaob have been cleared and replaced with grassland.

== Fauna ==
The ecoregion has 13 endemic species of birds – the Palau ground dove (Alopecoenas canifrons), Palau fruit dove (Ptilinopus pelewensis), Palau nightjar (Caprimulgus phalaena), Palau swiftlet (Aerodramus pelewensis), Palau scops owl ( Otus podarginis), Palau kingfisher (Todiramphus pelewensis), morningbird (Pachycephala tenebrosa), Palau cicadabird (Edolisoma monacha), Palau fantail (Rhipidura lepida), Palau flycatcher (Myiagra erythrops), Palau bush warbler (Horornis annae), giant white-eye (Megazosterops palauensis), and dusky white-eye (Zosterops finschii). The Palau scrubfowl (Megapodius laperouse senex) is an endemic subspecies of Micronesian scrubfowl, which also inhabits the Marianas.

== Protected areas ==
24.7% of the ecoregion is in protected areas.
