= Carolines tropical moist forests =

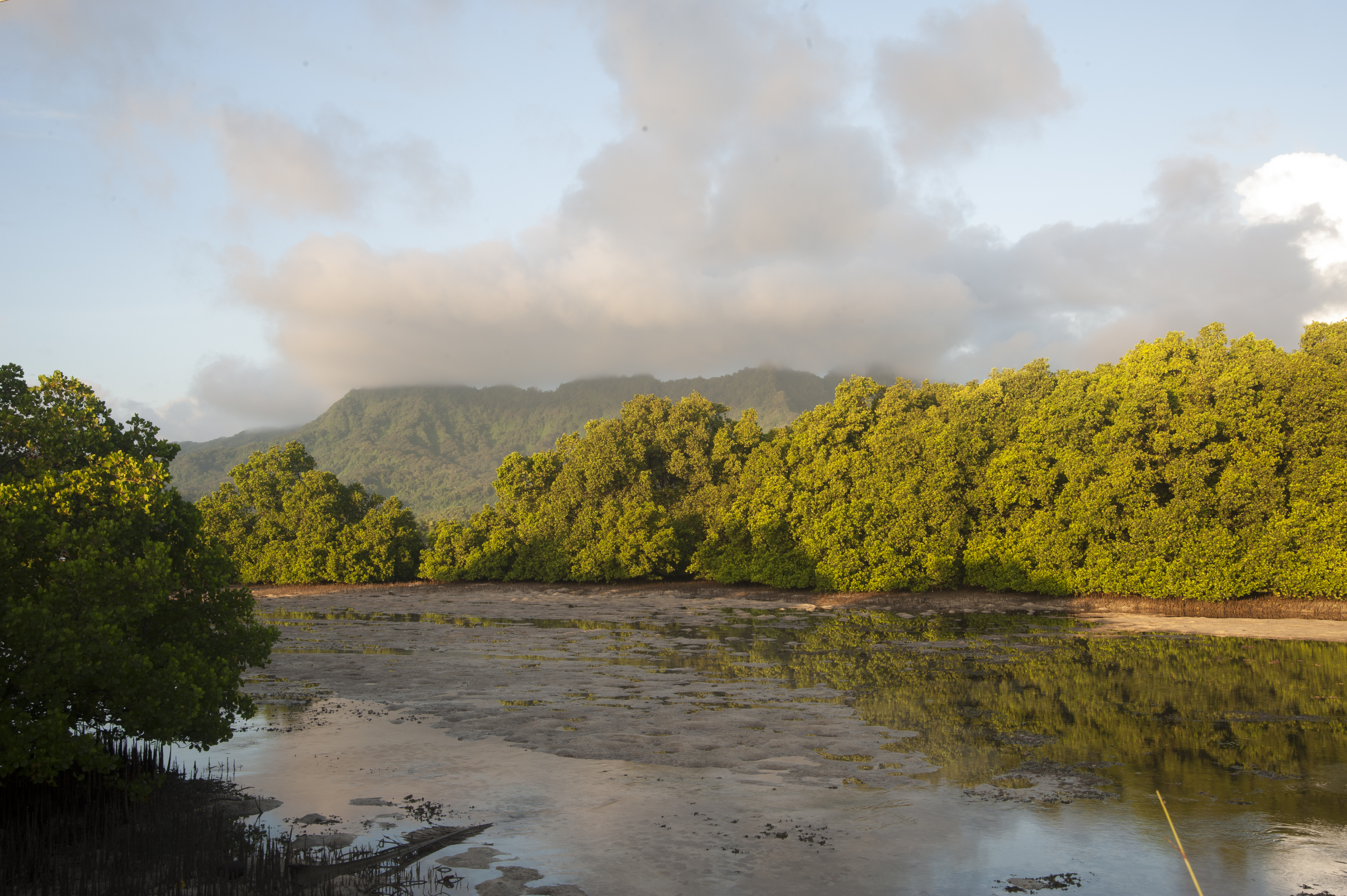
- forest on Kosrae

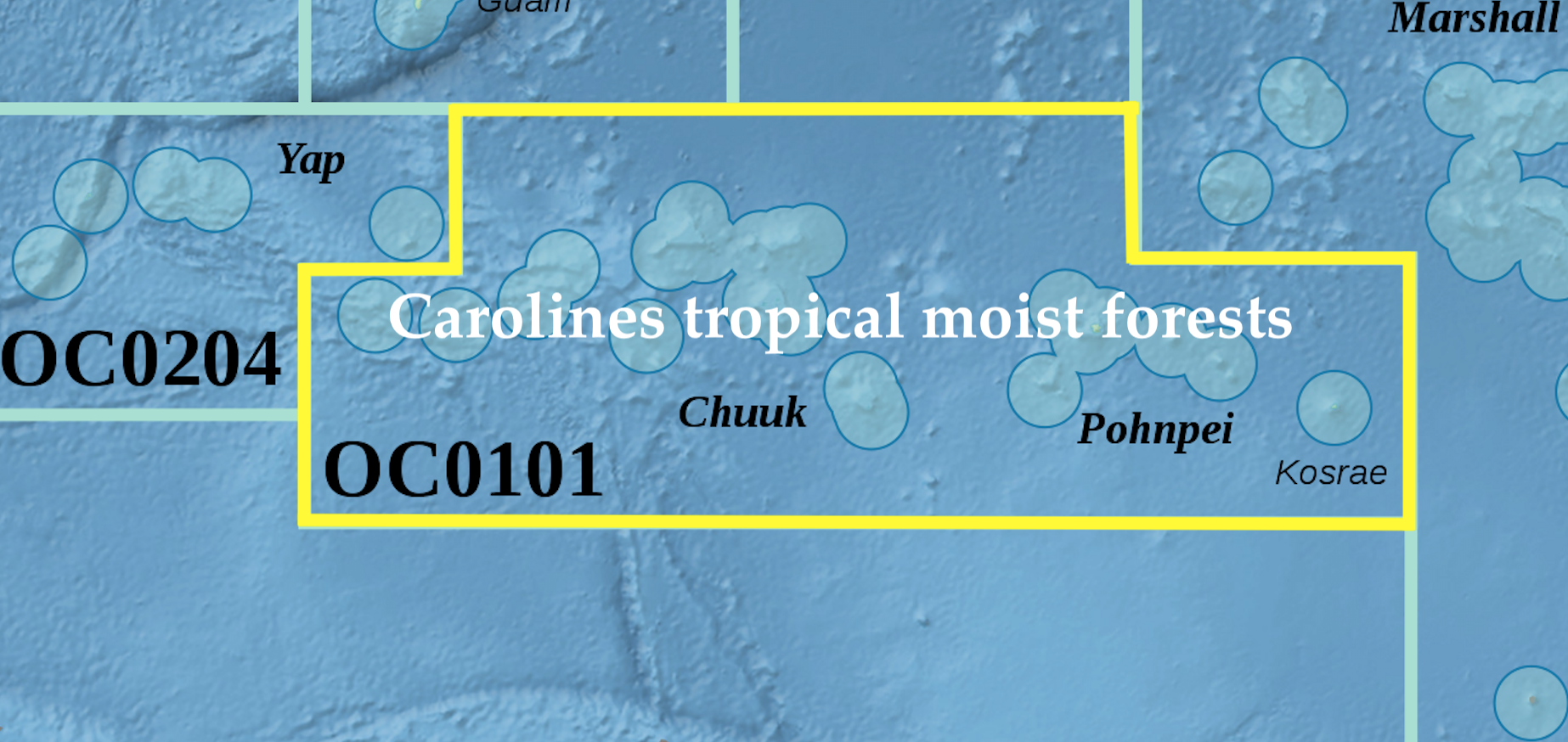
- Map of the Carolines tropical moist forests ecoregion

Ecology
- Realm: Oceanian
- Biome: tropical and subtropical moist broadleaf forests

Geography
- Area: 582 km^{2} (225 sq mi)
- Country: Federated States of Micronesia
- States: Chuuk; Kosrae; Pohnpei, Yap (portion)

Conservation
- Conservation status: Critical/endangered
- Protected: 0.03%

The Carolines tropical moist forests is a tropical and subtropical moist broadleaf forests ecoregion in Micronesia. It includes the central and eastern Caroline Islands in the Federated States of Micronesia.

== Geography ==
The ecoregion spans the central and eastern Caroline Islands, and include most of the Federated States of Micronesia it includes the states of Chuuk, Pohnpei, and Kosrae and the eastern islands of Yap State, known as the Remetau.

The ecoregion includes both high volcanic islands and low atolls, islands of coralline sand ringing a central lagoon.

The Chuuk islands are surrounded by almost circular barrier reef more than 60 km across at its widest point, which encloses a lagoon and 69 low islets composed of coral sand. Within the lagoon are 10 principal and many smaller volcanic islands in two clusters, the Faichuk group to the west and the Nomoneas group to the east. The largest island, Tol, reaches 443 meters elevation.

Pohnpei is an extinct volcano 650 km east of Chuuk. The island has an area of 335 km^{2}. It is composed of weathered basalt, and geologically younger than Chuuk. The center of the island is a tableland with 11 separate peaks, the tallest of which reaches 734 meters elevation.

Kosrae lies 550 km to southeast of Pohnpei towards the eastern end of the Carolines. It is a deeply dissected volcanic island with several steep high peaks, the highest of which reaches 629 meters elevation.

The ecoregion includes many atolls and atoll groups, including the Hall Islands north of Chuuk, the Remetau group west of Chuuk, and the Nomoi Islands southeast of Chuuk, and the Senyavin Islands around Pohnpei.

Palikir, the capital of the Federated States of Micronesia, is on Pohnpei. The largest city is Weno in Chuuk.

== Climate ==
The climate of the ecoregion is humid and tropical, with little variation in temperature from season to season. Rainfall is highest at the eastern end of the ecoregion, decreasing and becoming more seasonal towards the west. Pohnpei averages more than 4,500 mm of annual rainfall. Parts of Kosrae receive more than 6,400 mm per year.

== Flora ==
The natural vegetation of the islands was mostly tropical rain forest, with smaller areas of savanna and scrub, and mangroves along the shore. Atoll forests and coastal strand vegetation are found on the atolls. The principal forest types on the volcanic islands include lowland forest, montane forest, and cloud forest. Cloud forests occur as low as 450 meters on Pohnpei and 300 meters on Kosrae, which makes them some of the lowest-elevation tropical cloud forests in the world. The cloud forests are some of Oceania's most species-rich and are high in endemism. The islands are sufficiently close to Southeast Asia's diverse forests to allow plants to disperse, while the islands' age and relative isolation allowed plants to evolve into distinct species.

Humans have altered the islands vegetation, increasing the savanna area, especially in the western islands, with fires, and converting much of the lowland into gardens, fields, and plantations or secondary forest.

=== Pohnpei ===
Pohnpei is the highest and wettest island, and its vegetation is less degraded than the other islands.

The native lowland forests are mostly gone. There are areas of secondary forest and savanna, and well-preserved mangrove forests and freshwater swamp forests along the coast. Steeper slopes are covered in thickets of Hibiscus tiliaceus. About a third of Pohnpei is covered with a local silvicultural system of rotating tree gardens.

Areas of primary montane rain forest and cloud forest still exist in the mountainous center of the island. Upland forests are of two main plant associations, a Maesa carolinensis association between 450 and 680 meters elevation, and a Sphaeropteris lunulata–Pandanus patina on the highest slopes.

In the Maesa carolinensis association, the endemic palm Clinostigma ponapense forms the upper canopy layer, and the tree fern Sphaeropteris nigricans is dominant in the lower canopy. Maesa carolinensis and other shrubs are abundant in the understory. Other montane forest trees include species of Glochidion, Myrsine, Elaeocarpus, Syzygium, Psychotria, Timonius, Gynotroches, and Astronidium, and the palms Ptychosperma and Metroxylon. Lianas of Ipomoea, Merremia, Freycinetia, Hypserpa, and Pachygone are abundant, and there are many terrestrial and epiphytic ferns.

=== Kosrae ===
Primary montane forests and cloud forests persist in the highlands of Kosrae. The principal trees of Kosrae's montane forests include species of Horsfieldia, Neuburgia, Psychotria, Syzgium, Campnosperma, Macaranga, Dendrocnide, Boehmeria, and Ficus, tree ferns (Sphaeropteris sp.), and the sole indigenous palm Ponapea ledermanniana. Terrestrial and epiphytic fern are abundant and diverse.

The montane forests transition to dwarf cloud forest above 300 meters elevation. Canopy trees include Sphaeropteris lunulata, Elaeocarpus carolinensis, and Astronidium carolinense, with Polyscias subcapitata and Syzygium stelechanthoides abundant in the lower canopy. The understory is composed of lush mosses, herbaceous hepatics (members of the buttercup family, and the ferns Marattia fraxinea and Pteris spinescens There are many epiphytes, including Elaphoglossum carolinense, Hymenophyllum polyanthos, Lindsaea rigida, and the endemic Peperomia kusaiensis.

=== Chuuk ===
Little intact lowland or montane forest survives on Chuuk. The largest remnant montane forest is on Uinipot Peak on Tol Island. It is home to the endemic plants Heptapleurum kraemeri, Semecarpus kraemeri, and Atractocarpus carolinensis.

=== Atolls ===
The flora of the atolls is mostly of widespread coastal Indo-Pacific species, with relatively few endemic species.

== Fauna ==
Thirteen species of birds are endemic to the ecoregion. Three species are endemic to Chuuk, the Chuuk monarch (Metabolus rugensis), Chuuk flycatcher (Myiagra oceanica), and teardrop white-eye (Rukia ruki). Five are endemic to Pohnpei, including the Pohnpei fantail (Rhipidura kubaryi), Pohnpei mountain starling (Aplonis pelzeni), Pohnpei lory (Trichoglossus rubiginosus), and long-billed white-eye (Rukia longirostra). The Caroline ground-dove (Pampusana kubaryi) lives on Chuuk and Pohnpei, and the Caroline reed warbler (Acrocephalus syrinx) inhabits the ecoregion's high islands and atolls.

Another five species are restricted-range, and extend other Micronesian ecoregions. These include the Caroline swiftlet (Aerodramus inquietus), Micronesian imperial pigeon (Ducula oceanica), Micronesian starling (Aplonis opaca), citrine white-eye (Zosterops semperi), and Micronesian myzomela (Myzomela rubratra). 24 of the 29 recorded bird species on Pohnpei make extensive use of the upland forests.

The Kosrae crake (Porzana monasa) and Kosrae starling (Aplonis corvina)m formerly endemic to Kosrae, are extinct. Several other species are endangered or threatened. Native birds are threatened by habitat loss, and the introduced Polynesian rat (Rattus exulans) and other introduced rats which prey heavily on native birds. The mottled munia (Lonchura hunsteini) was introduced to Pohnpei from New Ireland in the 1920s, and is abundant on the north and east of the island.

The islands' native non-marine mammals are bats, including the widespread Pacific sheath-tailed bat (Emballonura semicaudata) and two endemic bats, the Caroline flying fox (Pteropus molossinus) and Pteropus pelagicus. P. pelagicus has subspecies on the Chuuk and Mortlock islands. The fruit bats are threatened by habitat loss and hunting for export.

There are 24 species of reptiles and amphibians in the Caroline islands, including four endemic species and one endemic genus.

The cloud forest on Pohnpei is home to 26 species of land snails, which represent 74 percent of the total species recorded on the island.

== Conservation and threats ==
Humans have dwelled in the ecoregion for over 2500 years. Early settlers brought and cultivated coconut, breadfruit, taro, bananas, and sugarcane in the lowlands.

Sakau (Piper methysticum) is grown on the three high islands. It requires fertile organic soil, and montane forests are being cleared to expand its cultivation.

== Protected areas ==
Pohnpei has protected all of its mangrove forests, and in 1987 established the Pohnpei Watershed Forest Reserve which protects 51 km^{2} of the island's interior forests.
