= Eastern Micronesia tropical moist forests =

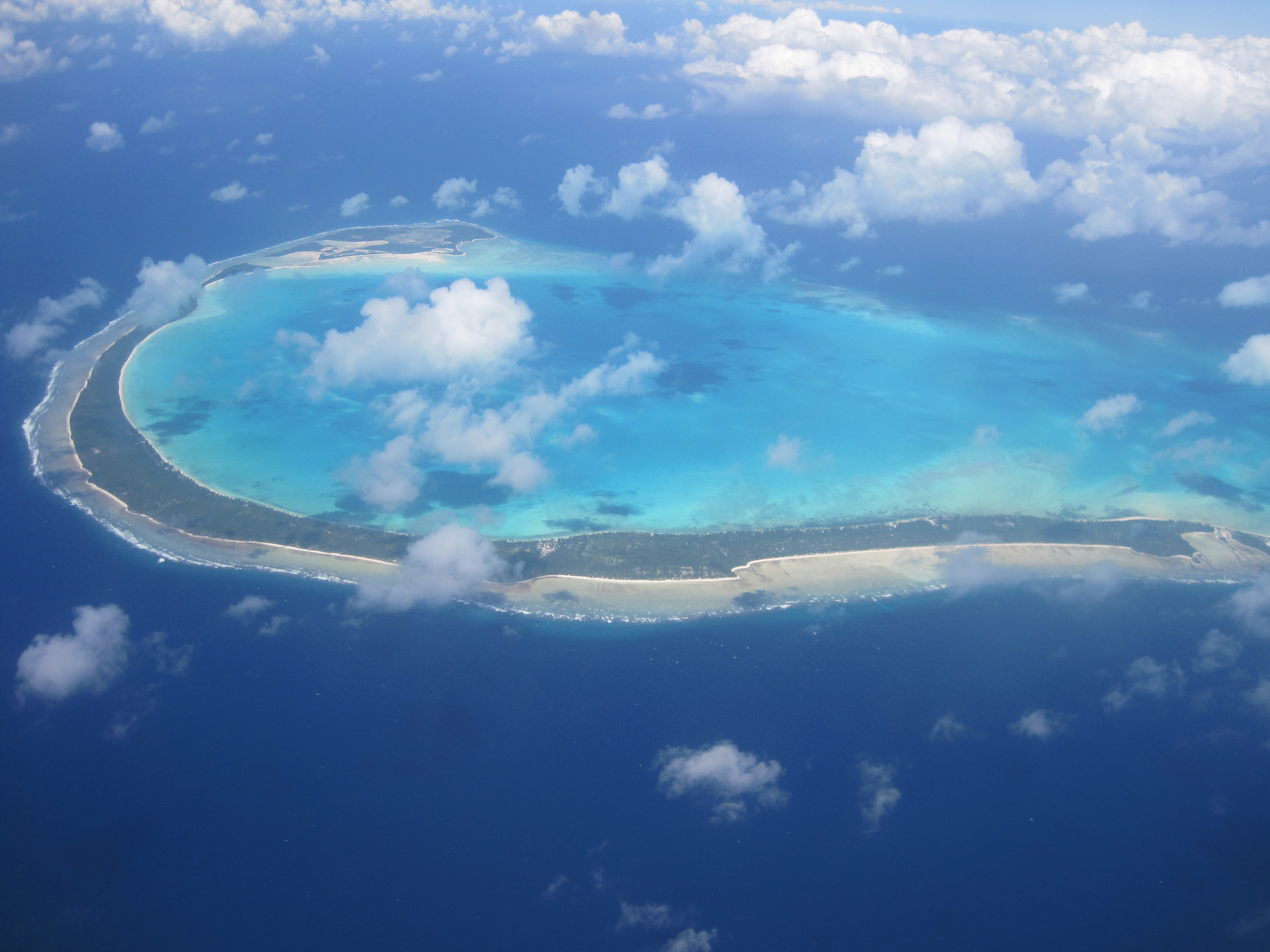
- Onotoa atoll in the Gilbert Islands

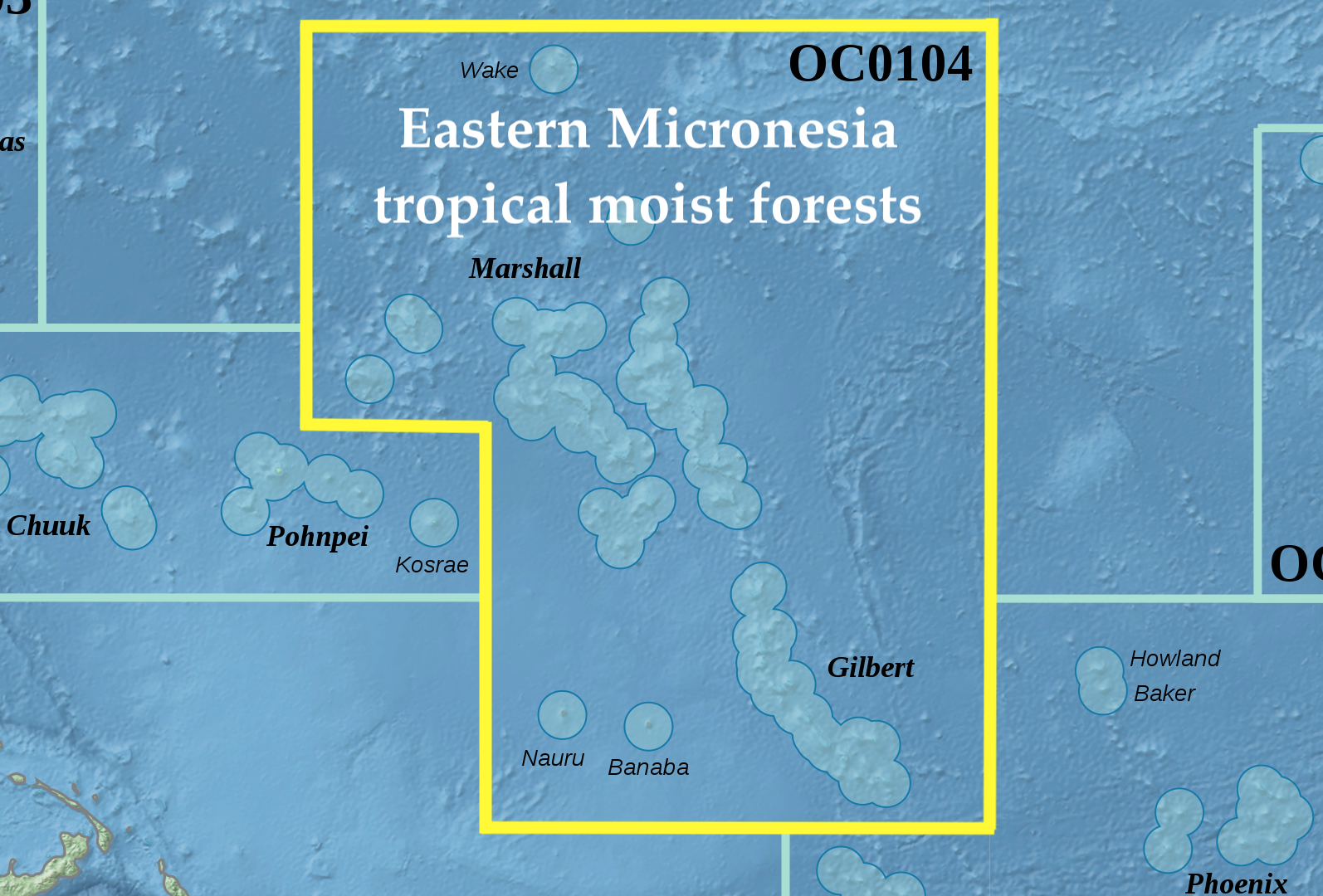
- Map of the Eastern Micronesia tropical moist forests ecoregion

Ecology
- Realm: Oceanian
- Biome: tropical and subtropical moist broadleaf forests

Geography
- Area: 534 km^{2} (206 sq mi)
- Countries: Kiribati; Marshall Islands; Nauru; United States

Conservation
- Conservation status: Critical/endangered
- Global 200: South Pacific Islands forests
- Protected: 8.2%

The Eastern Micronesia tropical moist forests is a tropical and subtropical moist broadleaf forests ecoregion in Micronesia. It includes the Marshall Islands, Banaba and the Gilbert Islands in Kiribati, Nauru, and Wake Island, a possession of the United States.

== Geography ==
The islands are mostly atolls, low islands of coralline sand ringing a central lagoon, or raised platforms of coralline limestone.

There are 30 atolls in the Marshall Islands, made up of more than 1000 islands. They form two parallel island chains that run southwest to northeast, extending 1,300 km from east to west and 1,150 km north to south. The western Ralik, or "sunset" chain extends from Enewetak to Ebon, and the eastern Ratak or "sunrise" chain from Bokak to Mili.

The Gilbert Islands lie southeast of the Marshall Islands, and include 16 atolls and coral islands.

Nauru and Banaba are low islands composed of uplifted coralline limestone lying west of the Gilbert Islands. Nauru is an independent country, and Banaba is part of Kiribati.

Wake Island is an isolated atoll north of the Marshall Islands.

== Climate ==
The climate of the islands is tropical, with little seasonal temperature variation.

The central part of the ecoregion lies in the trade wind belt, and receives the highest rainfall, up to 3000 mm annually. The northern islands, including the northern Marshalls and Wake island, are drier, as are the southern Gilberts. May through November are generally the wettest months. The Marshalls experience typhoons.

== Flora ==
The predominant vegetation on wetter islands is tropical moist forest. Forests nearer the shore are of short to medium stature, with the trees Heliotropium arboreum, Guettarda speciosa, Pisonia grandis, Pandanus tectorius, Allophylus timoriensis, Cordia subcordata, Hernandia nymphaeifolia, and Thespesia populnea. In the island interiors, mature forests of Ochrosia oppositifolia can grow in pure stands on the more humid islands. Pisonia grandis also occurs in monospecific stands, and can grow up to 30 meters tall with trunks more than two meters in diameter. The mature Ochrosia and Pisonia forests form a dense canopy, and little grows in the shady understory.

On drier islands and in areas exposed to salt spray, vegetation includes low grasses and beach creepers, coastal scrub, and low-canopied mixed forests.

The flora is mostly of widespread coastal Indo-Pacific species, with relatively few endemic species.

== Fauna ==
Native vertebrates are chiefly seabirds, which form large colonies on many islands. The Insular flying fox (Pteropus tonganus) and Pacific sheath-tailed bat (Emballonura semicaudata) are the only native non-marine mammals.

The Nauru reed warbler (Acrocephalus rehsei) is endemic to Nauru.

== Protected areas ==
8.2% of the ecoregion is in protected areas.
