= Western Polynesian tropical moist forests =

Terrestrial ecoregion in western Polynesia

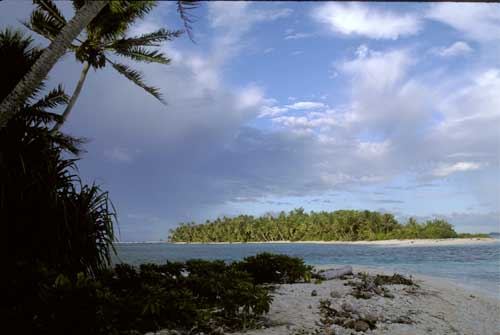
- Fualifeke islet of Funafuti atoll, Tuvalu

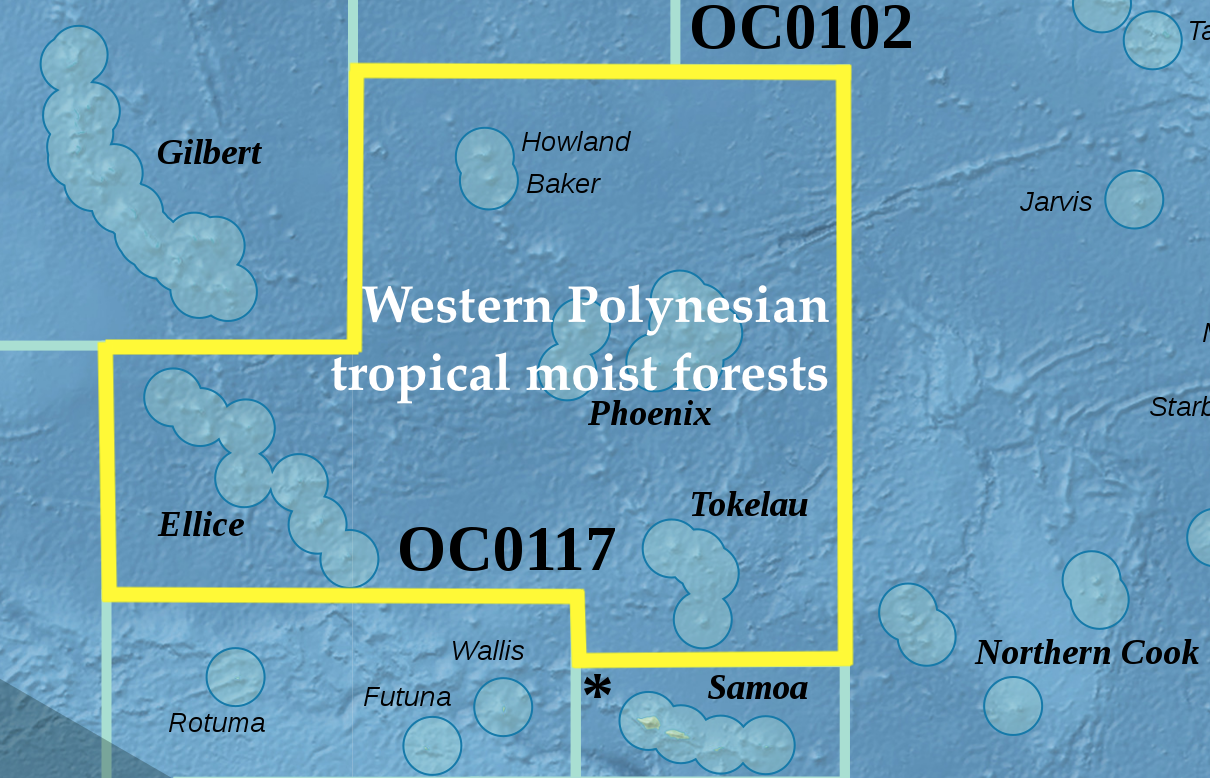
- Map of the Western Polynesian tropical moist forests ecoregion

Ecology
- Realm: Oceanian
- Biome: tropical and subtropical moist broadleaf forests

Geography
- Area: 93 km^{2} (36 mi^{2})
- Countries: Kiribati; Tokelau; Tuvalu; United States

Conservation
- Conservation status: Critical/endangered
- Global 200: South Pacific Islands forests
- Protected: 64.3%

The Western Polynesian tropical moist forests is a tropical and subtropical moist broadleaf forests ecoregion in Polynesia. It includes Tuvalu, the Phoenix Islands in Kiribati, Tokelau, and Howland and Baker islands, which are possessions of the United States.

== Geography ==
The islands are mostly atolls, low islands of coralline sand ringing a central lagoon, or raised platforms of coralline limestone. The ecoregion includes three archipelagos along with some scattered islands.

Tuvalu, formerly known as the Ellice Islands, includes nine atolls between 6º to 9º S latitude and 176º to 180º E longitude.

The Phoenix Islands include eight atolls between 2º to 5º S latitude and 171º to 175º W longitude. They are part of Kiribati, and mostly uninhabited.

Tokelau includes three inhabited atolls, Atafu, Nukunonu, and Fakaofo, and uninhabited Swain's Island, which is disputed with American Samoa. Tokelau lies between 8º to 12º S latitude and 170º to 173º W longitude.

Howland and Baker islands lie north of the Phoenix Islands.

== Climate ==
The climate of the islands is tropical, with little seasonal variation in temperature.

Tuvalu and Tokelau are in the trade wind belt, and average annual rainfall ranges 150 to 350 centimetres (59 to 138 in), falling relatively consistently from month to month and year to year.

Most of the Phoenix Islands and Howland and Baker islands receive less than 100 centimetres (39 in) of rain annually, with a March through June dry season. Rainfall on these islands is also more variable from year to year, with droughts during El Niño cycles.

== Flora ==
Native vegetation on the wetter islands is principally tropical moist forest, with shrub and herbaceous plant communities in rocky areas and shoreline areas exposed to salt spray. Characteristic canopy trees include Pisonia grandis up to 25 meters high, Cordia subcordata, and Heliotropium arboreum in single-species or mixed stands, with Calophyllum inophyllum, Pandanus tectorius, Hernandia nymphaeifolia, Ficus tinctoria, and Guettarda speciosa. Understory plants include the shrubs Suriana maritima and Pemphis acidula, the fern Asplenium nidus, and the vine Ipomoea violacea. Forests are interspersed with areas of Scaevola taccada and Morinda citrifolia scrub.

The drier islands are covered with low plants, including sparse grassland dominated by Lepturus repens, the creepers Portulaca spp., Sida fallax, and Sesuvium portulacastrum, the grass Eragrostis paupera, and occasionally the shrubs Cordia subcordata, Abutilon indicum, Suriana maritima, Pemphis acidula, and Tribulus cistoides.

The flora is mostly of widespread coastal Indo-Pacific species, with relatively few endemic species.

== Fauna ==
The native vertebrates are mostly seabirds, who roost in large numbers on many of the islands. The only forest birds are the Pacific imperial pigeon (Ducula pacifica), a year-round resident, and the migratory Pacific long-tailed cuckoo (Urodynamis taitensis), which winters in the tropical Pacific and breeds in New Zealand during the spring and summer. There are no native non-marine mammals or amphibians.

Polynesian rat (Rattus exulans) and house cats have been introduced to several islands, and prey heavily on native birds. Buff-banded rails (Hypotaenidia philippensis) from Fiji have recently colonized Niulakita in Tuvalu.

== Protected areas ==
64.3% of the ecoregion is in protected areas. Protected areas include the Phoenix Islands Protected Area.
