= Tamaulipan matorral =

Xeric shrubland ecoregion in Nuevo León and Tamaulipas, Mexico

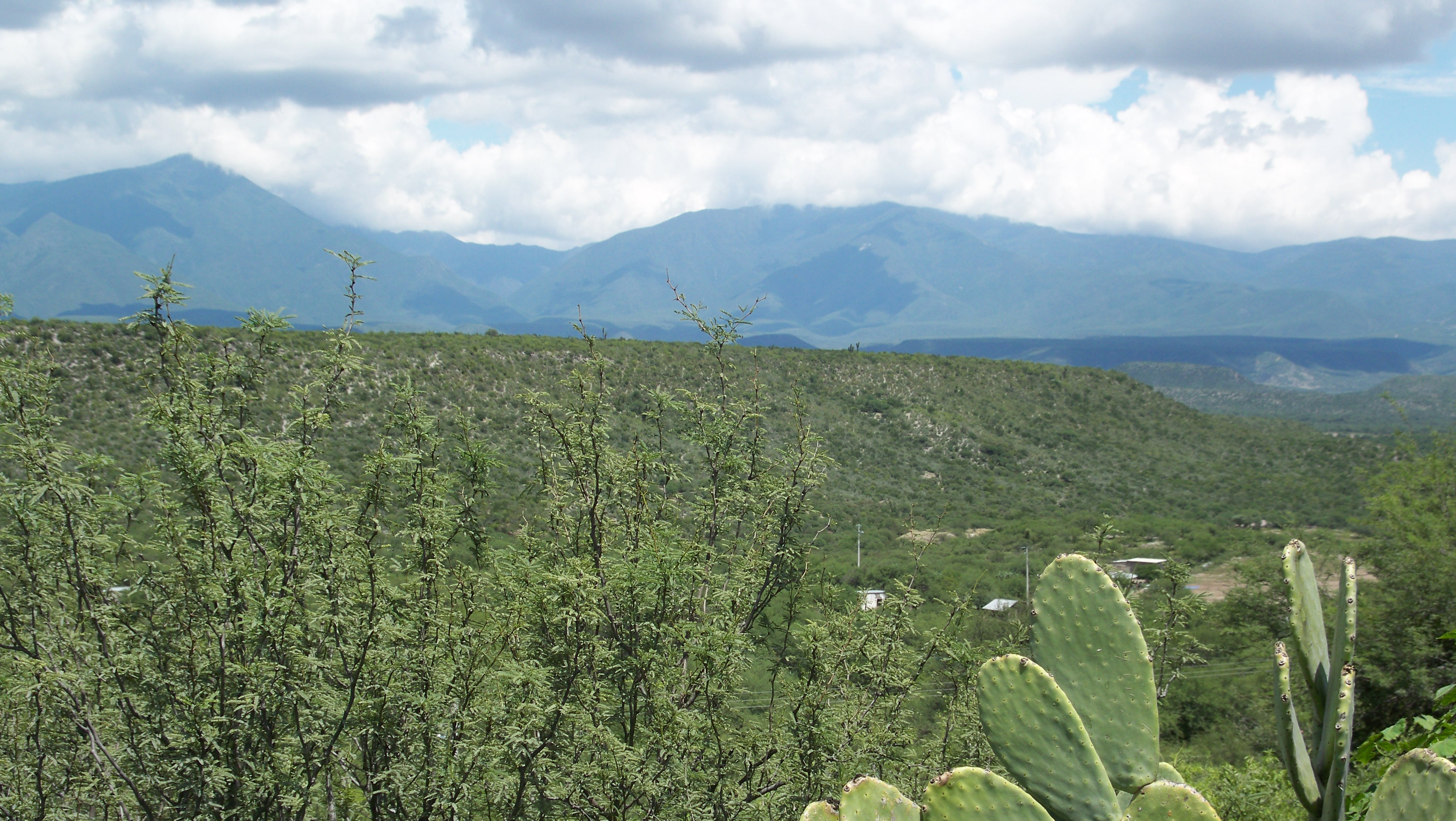
- Jaumave, Tamaulipas

- Tamaulipan matorral

Ecology
- Realm: Nearctic
- Biome: deserts and xeric shrublands
- Borders: Tamaulipan mezquital; Sierra Madre Oriental pine-oak forests; Veracruz moist forests

Geography
- Area: 16,300 km^{2} (6,300 mi^{2})
- Country: Mexico
- States: Tamaulipas; Nuevo León

Conservation
- Conservation status: Critical/endangered
- Global 200: No
- Protected: 6.15%

The Tamaulipan matorral is an ecoregion in the deserts and xeric shrublands biome located on the eastern slopes of the Sierra Madre Oriental range in northeastern Mexico. It is a transitional ecoregion between the Tamaulipan mezquital and the Sierra Madre Oriental pine-oak forests to the west and the Veracruz moist forests to the south.

The Tamaulipan matorral is a desert shrubland where the flora mainly consists of woody shrubs, small trees, cacti, and succulents. Piedmont scrub occurs in shallow hollows and montane chaparral occurs above about 1,700 m (5,600 ft). There are a number of resident bird species and the mammals include Allen's squirrel, collared peccary and coyote.

== Setting ==
The Tamaulipan matorral extends along the eastern slopes of the Sierra Madre Oriental range in northeastern Mexico, extending from central Tamaulipas state across central Nuevo León. The ecoregion covers an area of 16,300 km^{2} (6,300 sq mi). The humid Veracruz moist forests lie to the southeast, on the Gulf Coastal Plain of southern Tamaulipas and Veracruz states; the Tamaulipan mezquital lies in the Rio Grande lowlands to the east and northeast. The Sierra Madre Oriental pine-oak forests occupy higher elevations of the Sierra Madre Oriental range to the west.

== Flora ==
The ecoregion is predominantly a desert shrubland made up of woody shrubs, small trees, cacti, and succulents. Dominant plant species include Cylindropuntia leptocaulis, Opuntia engelmannii var. lindheimeri, Prosopis juliflora, P. laevigata, Yucca filifera, Salvia ballotiflora, Jatropha dioica, cenizo (Leucophyllum frutescens), Mammillaria heyderi hemisphaerica, tepeguaje (Leucaena pulverulenta) and Mimosa aculeaticarpa var. biuncifera. Piedmont scrub is found in shallow soils derived from sedimentary rocks at the base of the Sierra Madre (below 2,000 m or 6,600 ft) and receives 450–900 mm (18–35 in) of annual rainfall. It is composed of relatively short plants (3 to 5 m or 9.8 to 16.4 ft in height) such as Helietta parvifolia, Neopringlea integrifolia and Acacia spp. Montane chaparral is a distinct plant community found above 1,700 m (5,600 ft) in the Sierra Madre Oriental, composed of oaks (Quercus spp.), Arbutus, Yucca, Cercocarpus, and Bauhinia.

== Fauna ==
Mammals present in this ecoregion include the nine-banded armadillo (Dasypus novemcinctus mexicanus) Allen's squirrel (Sciurus alleni), collared peccary (Pecari tajacu) and coyote (Canis latrans). Birds such as the eastern screech-owl (Megascops asio mcallii), hooded oriole (Icterus cucullatus), eastern meadowlark (Sturnella magna), long-billed thrasher (Toxostoma longirostre), common yellowthroat (Geothlypis trichas), blue bunting (Cyanocompsa parellina) and olive sparrow (Arremonops rufivirgatus) are resident.

== Protected areas ==
6.15% of the ecoregion is in protected areas. Protected areas include Cumbres de Monterrey National Park, Cerro de la Silla Natural Monument, and the Cerro El Topo, Cerro La Mota, Sierra Cerro de la Silla, Sierra El Fraile y San Miguel, Sierra Las Mitras, and Sierra Picachos ecological conservation areas.

== See also ==
- List of ecoregions in Mexico
