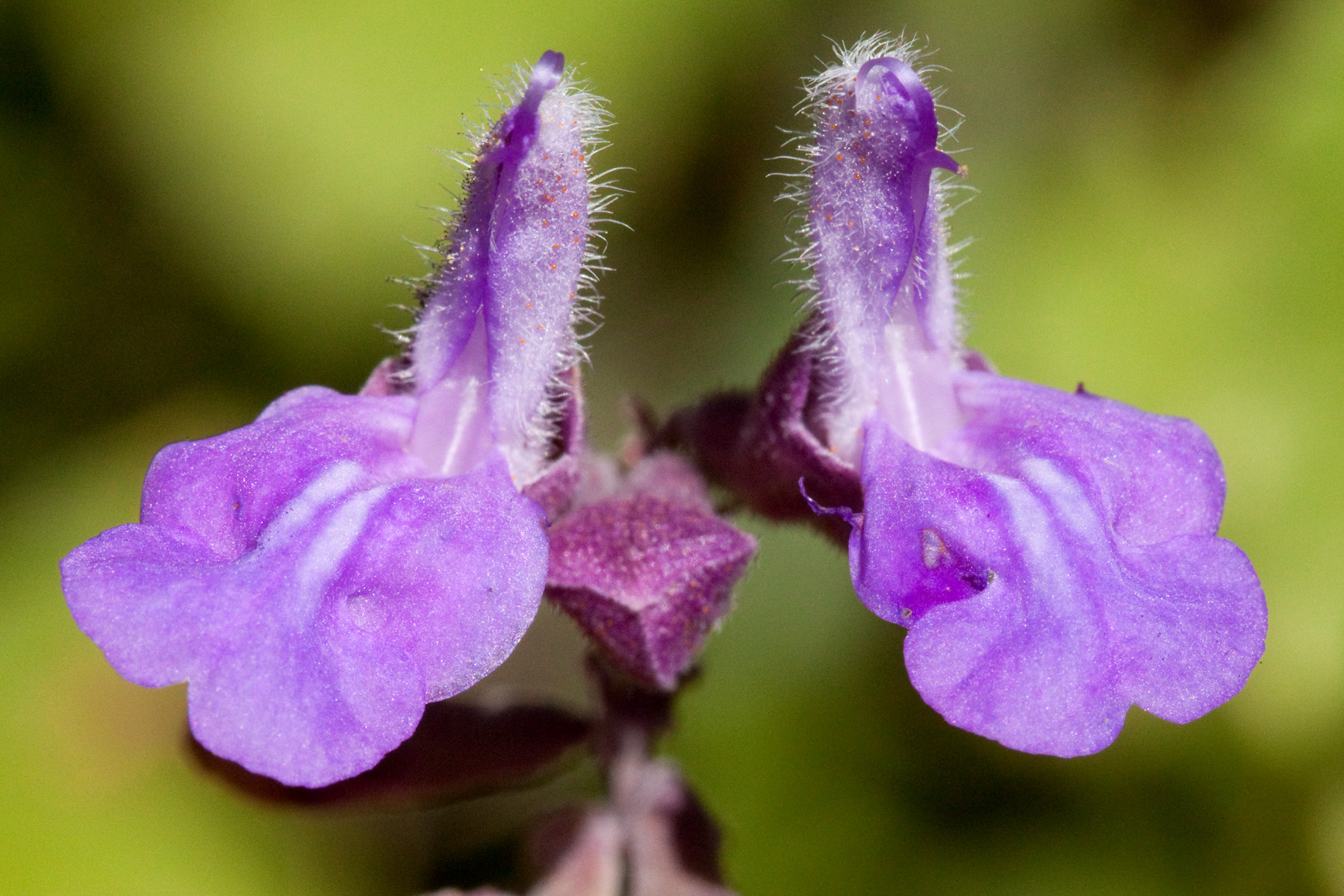

Scientific classification
- Kingdom: Plantae
- Clade: Tracheophytes
- Clade: Angiosperms
- Clade: Eudicots
- Clade: Asterids
- Order: Lamiales
- Family: Lamiaceae
- Genus: Salvia
- Species: S. pinguifolia

Binomial name
- Salvia pinguifolia (Fernald) Wooton & Standl.

Synonyms
- Salvia ballotiflora var. pinguifolia Fernald

= Salvia pinguifolia =

Species of flowering plant

Salvia pinguifolia (rock sage) is a species of flowering plant in the family Lamiaceae that is native to southern Arizona, southern New Mexico, and western Texas in the United States as well as Chihuahua in Mexico. It inhabits rocky slopes at elevations of 2,000–7,000 ft (610–2,130 m). The specific name is derived from the Latin words pinguis, meaning, "grease", and folium, meaning "leaf," referring to the texture of the leaves. Leaf shape is ovate-deltoid to oblong elliptical. S. pinguifolia had a greater range during the Late Wisconsin glacial period; for example, it was present in the Waterman Mountains of southeastern Arizona (northern Pima County) in that earlier epoch, but is no longer extant there.
