= Veracruz dry forests =

Ecoregion in Mexico

Coordinates: 18.71°N 95.93°W

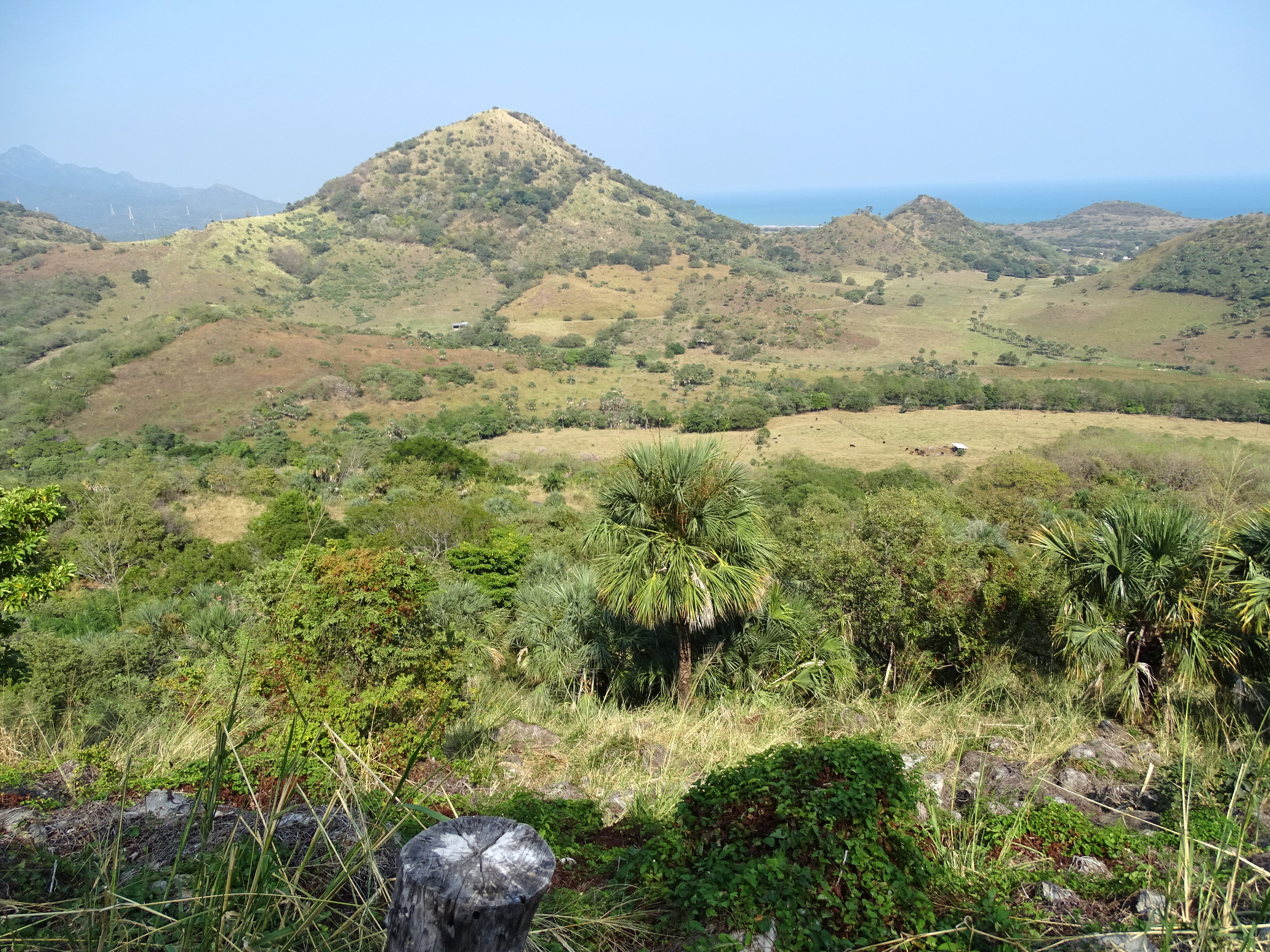
- Countryside outside Quiahuiztlan Archaeological Site, Veracruz

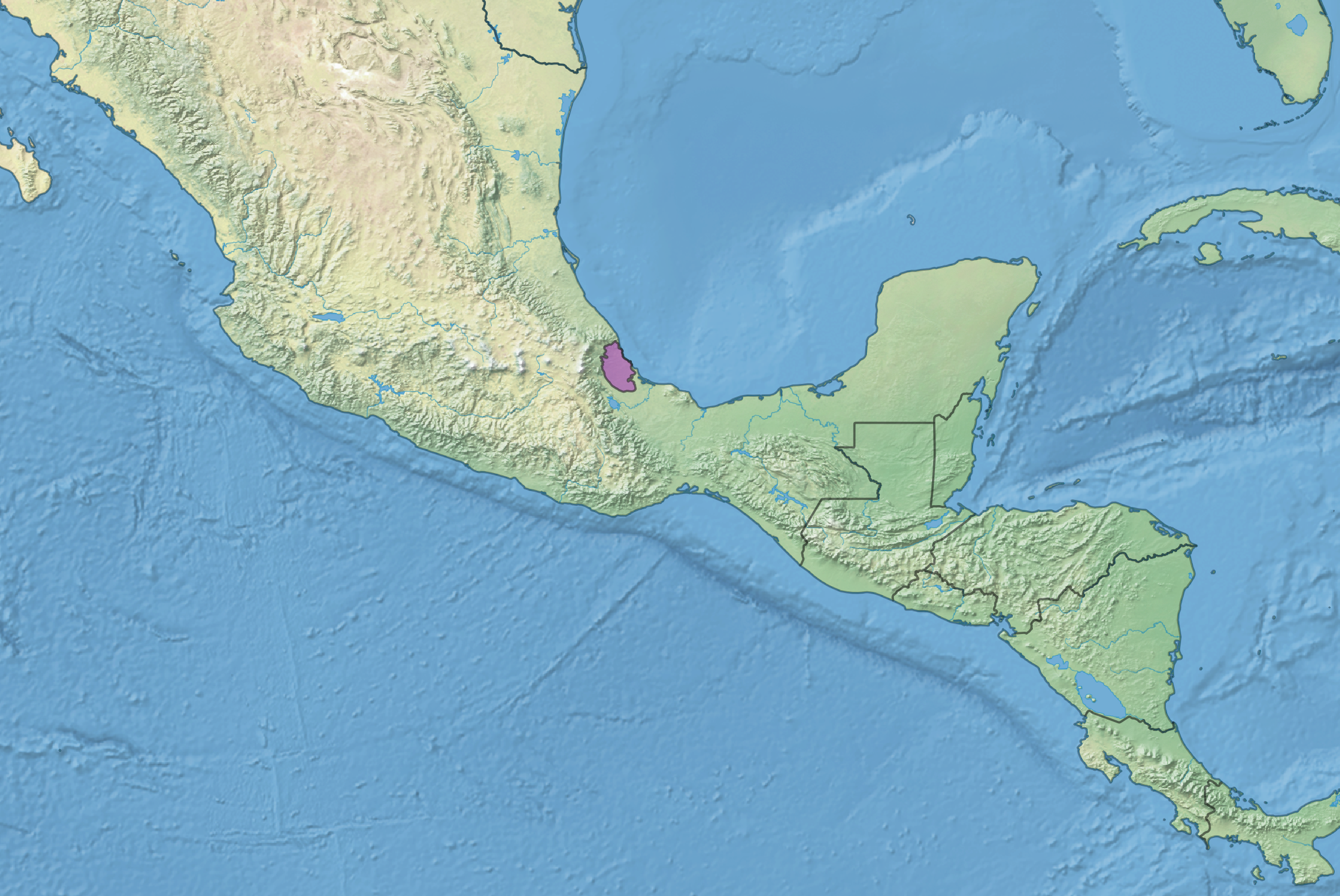
- Map of the Veracruz dry forests (purple)

Ecology
- Realm: Neotropical
- Biome: tropical and subtropical dry broadleaf forests
- Borders: Petén–Veracruz moist forests; Veracruz moist forests

Geography
- Area: 6,591 km^{2} (2,545 sq mi)
- Country: Mexico
- States: Veracruz

Conservation
- Conservation status: Critical/endangered
- Protected: 234 km^{2} (4%)

The Veracruz dry forests are a tropical and subtropical dry broadleaf forest ecoregion located in central Veracruz, Mexico. They cover an area of 6,600 km^{2} (2,500 sq mi). The dry climate is a result of the rain shadow created by the Sierra de Chiconquiaco. The forests receive <1,000 mm (39 in) of annual rainfall, and a long dry season forces many plants to be deciduous. Soils are derived from sedimentary rocks and are calcareous.

== Flora ==
Cordia dodecandra, Tabebuia chrysantha, Piscidia piscipula, Crescentia alata, Enterolobium cyclocarpum, Ehretia tenuifolia and Tabebuia rosea are dominant species. Succulents are abundant and include species of Acanthocereus, Agave and Opuntia. Epiphytes and shrubs in the genera Acacia, Bursera, Ficus, Phyllanthus, and Pithecellobium have the greatest diversity of species. Herbaceous plants are scarce.

== Fauna ==
Birds of the Veracruz dry forests include the sharp-shinned hawk (Accipiter striatus), merlin (Falco columbarius), white-winged dove (Zenaida asiatica), lesser roadrunner (Geococcyx velox), Mexican sheartail (Doricha eliza), Couch's kingbird (Tyrannus couchii), Swainson’s thrush (Catharus ustulatus), red-eyed vireo (Vireo olivaceous), magnolia warbler (Dendroia magnolia), and blue-black grassquit (Vilatinia jacarina). The area is rich in herpetofauna such as the black-spotted newt (Notophthalmus meridionalis), and Tabasco mud turtle (Kinosternon acutum).

== See also ==
- List of ecoregions in Mexico
