= Pánuco minnow =

Conservation status
- Near Threatened (IUCN 3.1)

Scientific classification
- Kingdom: Animalia
- Phylum: Chordata
- Class: Actinopterygii
- Order: Cypriniformes
- Family: Leuciscidae
- Subfamily: Pogonichthyinae
- Genus: Tampichthys
- Species: T. catostomops

Binomial name
- Tampichthys catostomops (C. L. Hubbs & R. R. Miller, 1977)

Synonyms
- Dionda catostomops Hubbs & Miller, 1977

Species of fish

The Pánuco minnow (Tampichthys catostomops) is a species of freshwater ray-finned fish belonging to the family Leuciscidae, the shiners, daces and minnows. This fish is endemic to Mexico.
