= Blackstripe minnow =

Conservation status
- Endangered (IUCN 3.1)

Scientific classification
- Kingdom: Animalia
- Phylum: Chordata
- Class: Actinopterygii
- Order: Cypriniformes
- Family: Leuciscidae
- Subfamily: Pogonichthyinae
- Genus: Tampichthys
- Species: T. rasconis

Binomial name
- Tampichthys rasconis (D. S. Jordan & Snyder, 1899)

Synonyms
- Notropis rasconis D. S. Jordan & Snyder, 1953; Dionda rasconis (D. S. Jordan & Snyder, 1953)

Species of fish

The blackstripe minnow (Tampichthys rasconis) is a species of freshwater ray-finned fish belonging to the family Leuciscidae, the shiners, daces and minnows. This fish is endemic to Mexico.
