= Flatjaw minnow =

Conservation status
- Endangered (IUCN 3.1)

Scientific classification
- Kingdom: Animalia
- Phylum: Chordata
- Class: Actinopterygii
- Order: Cypriniformes
- Family: Leuciscidae
- Subfamily: Pogonichthyinae
- Genus: Tampichthys
- Species: T. mandibularis

Binomial name
- Tampichthys mandibularis (Contreras-Balderas & Verduzco-Martínez, 1977)

Synonyms
- Dionda mandibularis Contreras-Balderas & Verduzco-Martínez, 1977

Species of fish

The flatjaw minnow (Tampichthys mandibularis) is a species of freshwater ray-finned fish belonging to the family Leuciscidae, the shiners, daces and minnows. This fish is endemic to Mexico. It is considered critically endangered.
