= Tampichthys =

Scientific classification
- Kingdom: Animalia
- Phylum: Chordata
- Class: Actinopterygii
- Order: Cypriniformes
- Family: Leuciscidae
- Subfamily: Pogonichthyinae
- Genus: Tampichthys; Schönhuth, Doadrio, Domínguez-Domínguez, Hillis & Mayden, 2008

Type species
- Notropis rasconis D. S. Jordan & Snyder, 1899

Genus of fishes

Tampichthys is a genus of freshwater ray-finned fish belonging to the family Leuciscidae, the shiners, daces and minnows. The fishes in this genus are endemic to east–central Mexico. They are entirely restricted to the Pánuco River basin, except T. ipni, which also occurs in some other Mexican rivers that drain into the Gulf of Mexico.

These are small fish, generally no more than 9 cm (3.5 in) long, and overall brownish-silvery with a distinct dark horizontal line from the head to the tail base.

== Species ==
Tampichthys was formerly considered a part of Dionda instead of a separate genus. Below is a list of the described species in Tampichthys, but undescribed species are known.

- Tampichthys catostomops (C. L. Hubbs & R. R. Miller, 1977) (Pánuco minnow)
- Tampichthys dichromus (C. L. Hubbs & R. R. Miller, 1977) (Bicolor minnow)
- Tampichthys erimyzonops (C. L. Hubbs & R. R. Miller, 1974) (Chubsucker minnow)
- Tampichthys ipni (Álvarez & L. Navarro, 1953) (Lantern minnow)
- Tampichthys mandibularis (Contreras-Balderas & Verduzco-Martínez, 1977) (Flatjaw minnow)
- Tampichthys rasconis (D. S. Jordan & Snyder, 1899) (Blackstripe minnow)
