= Lantern minnow =

Conservation status
- Least Concern (IUCN 3.1)

Scientific classification
- Kingdom: Animalia
- Phylum: Chordata
- Class: Actinopterygii
- Order: Cypriniformes
- Family: Leuciscidae
- Subfamily: Pogonichthyinae
- Genus: Tampichthys
- Species: T. ipni

Binomial name
- Tampichthys ipni (Álvarez & L. Navarro, 1953)

Synonyms
- Notropis ipni Alvarez & Navarro, 1953; Dionda ipni (Alvarez & Navarro, 1953)

Species of fish

The lantern minnow (Tampichthys ipni) is a species of freshwater ray-finned fish belonging to the family Leuciscidae, the shiners, daces and minnows. This fish is endemic to Mexico.
