= Chubsucker minnow =

Conservation status
- Data Deficient (IUCN 3.1)

Scientific classification
- Kingdom: Animalia
- Phylum: Chordata
- Class: Actinopterygii
- Order: Cypriniformes
- Family: Leuciscidae
- Subfamily: Pogonichthyinae
- Genus: Tampichthys
- Species: T. erimyzonops

Binomial name
- Tampichthys erimyzonops (C. L. Hubbs & R. R. Miller, 1974)

Synonyms
- Dionda erimyzonops Hubbs & Miller, 1974

Species of fish

The chubsucker minnow (Tampichthys erimyzonops) is a species of freshwater ray-finned fish belonging to the family Leuciscidae, the shiners, daces and minnows.This fish is endemic to Mexico.
