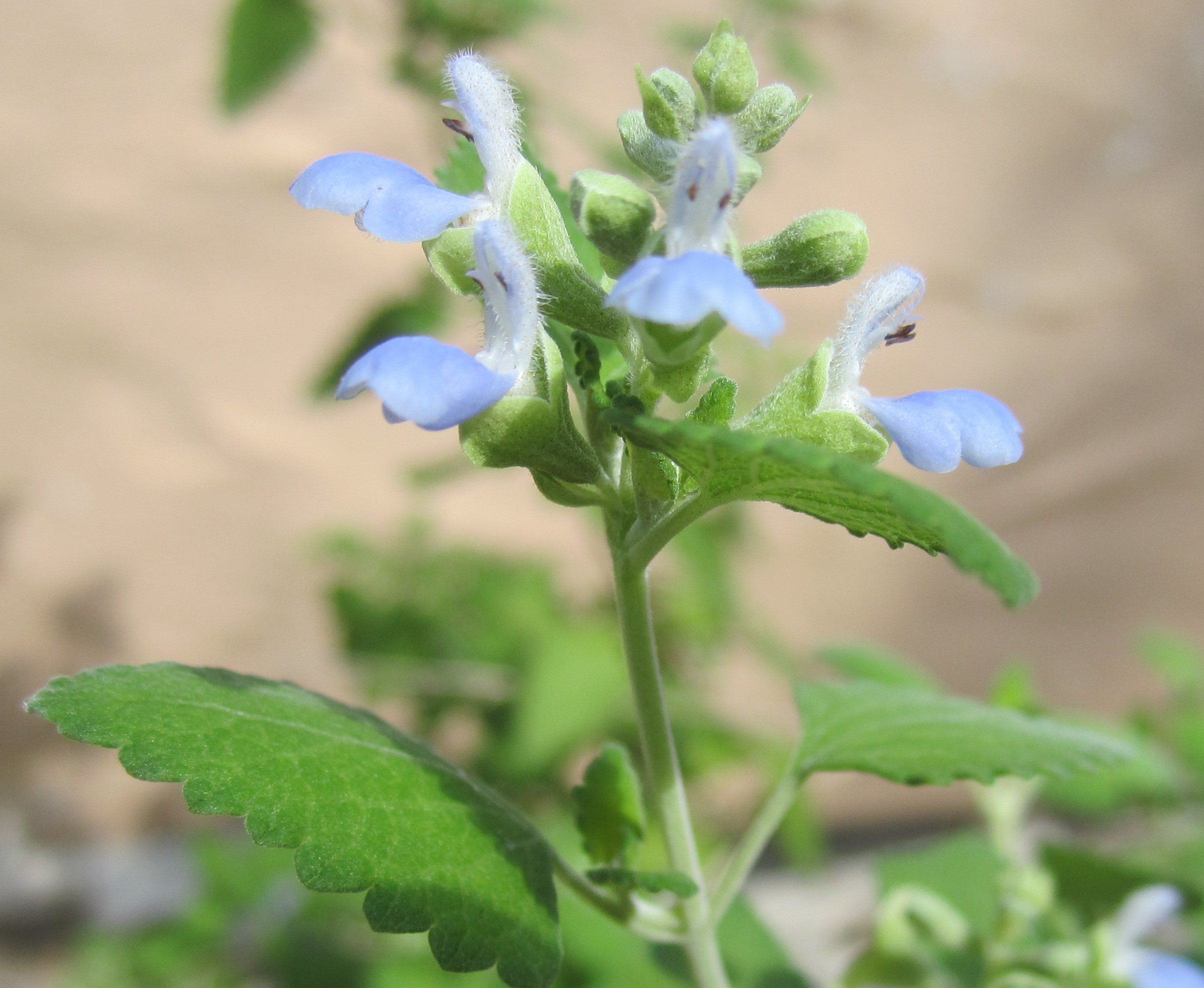

Scientific classification
- Kingdom: Plantae
- Clade: Tracheophytes
- Clade: Angiosperms
- Clade: Eudicots
- Clade: Asterids
- Order: Lamiales
- Family: Lamiaceae
- Genus: Salvia
- Species: S. ballotiflora

Binomial name
- Salvia ballotiflora Benth.

Synonyms
- Salvia ballotaeflora

= Salvia ballotiflora =

Species of flowering plant

Salvia ballotiflora is a species of flowering plant in the mint family, Lamiaceae, that is native to Texas in the United States as well as northeastern and central Mexico. Common names include shrubby blue sage and mejorana.

== Description ==
Shrubby blue sage is a shrub, growing to a height of 1.2–1.8 m (3.9–5.9 ft) with a spread half of that. The ovate leaves are 1.5–3.8 cm (0.59–1.50 in) long and have serrated or wavy margins. Trichomes on the upper and lower surfaces of the leaves give them a rough texture. Its profuse light blue to purple flowers are less than 1.3 cm (0.51 in) in length and are produced from April to October.

== Habitat and range ==
Salvia ballotiflora is found in the Edwards Plateau and Tamaulipan mezquital of southern and western Texas. Its range in Mexico includes the states of Coahuila, Durango, Hidalgo, Nuevo León, and Zacatecas. It prefers alkaline soils, such as those of limestone canyons.

== Uses ==
The leaves of shrubby blue sage are used for flavoring foods. It is cultivated as an ornamental for its colorful blooms.
