= Ría Celestun Biosphere Reserve =

Biosphere reserve in Mexico

- IUCN category VI (protected area with sustainable use of natural resources)
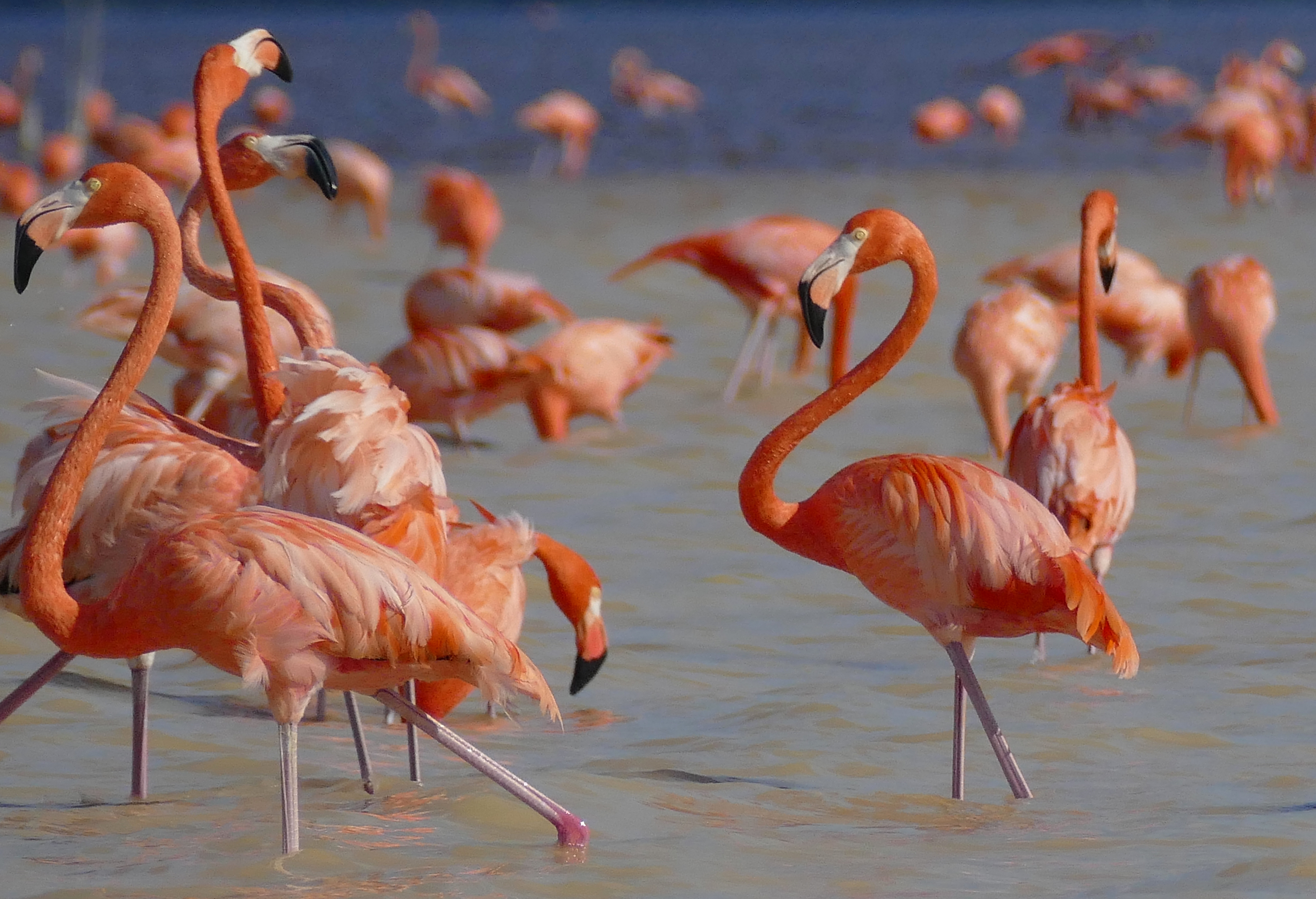
- American flamingoes (Phoenicopterus ruber) at Ría Celestun Biosphere Reserve

- Location within Mexico
- Location: Yucatán Peninsula, Mexico
- Nearest town: Celestún, Yucatán
- Coordinates: 20°45′N 90°22′W
- Area: 814.82 km^{2} (314.60 sq mi)
- Designation: Biosphere reserve
- Designated: 2000 (national) 2004 (UNESCO)
- Governing body: National Commission of Natural Protected Areas

Ramsar Wetland
- Official name: Reserva de la Biosfera Ría Celestún
- Designated: 2 February 2004
- Reference no.: 1333

Ría Celestun Biosphere Reserve (Spanish: Reserva de la Biosfera Ría Celestún) is a biosphere reserve in Mexico. It is located on the northwestern Yucatán Peninsula in the states of Yucatán and Campeche. The reserve is home to extensive mangrove wetlands, and rich in birds and other wildlife.

== Geography ==
The reserve covers an area of 814.82 square kilometres (314.60 sq mi). It is bounded on the west by the Gulf of Mexico. It adjoins Los Petenes Biosphere Reserve to the south, and El Palmar State Reserve to the north.

The reserve includes coastal beaches and dunes, which enclose lagoons and wetlands. There are low uplands in the eastern portion of the reserve.

The reserve is home to about 7000 people. Celestún, located on the coast within the reserve, is the largest settlement. It a center for visitor-serving activities and eco-tourism. Other economic activities in the reserve include fishing and harvesting sea salt.

== Ecology ==
The reserve protects extensive mangrove wetlands, part of a mangrove corridor known as the Petenes mangroves which extends along the western shore of the Yucatán Peninsula. Freshwater from the peninsula's extensive aquifer has an outlet in the reserve, mixing with the salt waters of the Gulf of Mexico in the wetlands.

There are coastal dunes, and tropical dry forests in the uplands.

The reserve is home to large and diverse populations of migratory and resident birds, with over 304 species identified. 56% of species are year-round residents, 43% are seasonal, and 1% are occasional visitors. American flamingoes (Phoenicopterus ruber) are a prominent species, with a population that can reach over 23,000 birds. Other bird species present here include the plumbeous kite (Ictinia plumbea) brant goose (Branta bernicla), Muscovy duck (Cairina moschata), piping plover (Charadrius melodus), ocellated turkey (Agriocharis ocellata), Yucatan poorwill (Nyctiphrynus yucatanicus), Yucatan wren (Campylorhynchus yucatanicus), Yucatan jay (Cyanocorax yucatanicus), and orange oriole (Icterus auratus). The reserve, together with the adjacent El Palmar State Reserve, is designated an Important bird area.

== Conservation ==
The area was designated a biosphere reserve in 2000 by the Mexican government. In 2004 UNESCO designated it a biosphere reserve in the international Man and the Biosphere Programme, and in the same year it was designated a wetland of international importance under the Ramsar Convention.

In 2008 the Mexican government nominated the Ría Celestún and adjacent Los Petenes reserves as a World Heritage Site.

In Campeche’s Isla Arena, within the reserve, Conservation International Mexico and the National Commission of Natural Protected Areas (CONANP) carried out a pilot community mangrove restoration project aimed at restoring 217 hectares of degraded mangroves, including hydrological restoration to re-establish water flow in affected areas. The work has also been described as including channel-digging to restore hydrology after road construction disrupted local water flow through mangrove areas.
