= Los Petenes Biosphere Reserve =

Protected area in Campeche, Mexico

- IUCN category Ia (strict nature reserve)
- Location within Mexico
- Location: Yucatán Peninsula, Mexico
- Nearest town: Campeche, Campeche
- Coordinates: 20°11′N 90°32′W
- Area: 2,828.58 km^{2} (1,092.12 sq mi)
- Designation: Biosphere reserve
- Designated: 1999
- Governing body: National Commission of Natural Protected Areas

Ramsar Wetland
- Official name: Reserva de la Biosfera Los Petenes
- Designated: 2 February 2004
- Reference no.: 1354

Los Petenes Biosphere Reserve (Spanish: Reserva de la Biosfera Los Petenes) is a biosphere reserve in Mexico. It is located on the western Yucatán Peninsula in the state of Campeche. The reserve is home to extensive mangrove wetlands, and rich in birds and other wildlife.

== Geography ==
The reserve covers an area of 814.82 square kilometres (314.60 sq mi). It is bounded on the west by the Gulf of Mexico. It adjoins Ría Celestun Biosphere Reserve on the north. The city of Campeche is south of the reserve.

The reserve includes coastal beaches and dunes, which enclose lagoons and wetlands. There are low uplands in the eastern portion of the reserve.

== Ecology ==
The reserve protects extensive mangrove wetlands, part of a mangrove corridor known as the Petenes mangroves which extends along the western shore of the Yucatán Peninsula. Freshwater from the peninsula's extensive aquifer has outlets in the reserve, mixing with the salt waters of the Gulf of Mexico in the wetlands.

Button mangrove (Conocarpus erectus) and Campeche wood (Haematoxylum campechianum) are notable mangrove species. There are seagrass beds offshore and in the lagoons, and tropical dry forests in the uplands.

The reserve is home to large and diverse populations of migratory and resident birds, with over 300 species identified. 56% of species are year-round residents, 43% are seasonal, and 1% are occasional visitors. Bird species present include the American flamingo (Phoenicopterus ruber), jabiru (Jabiru mycteria), wood stork (Mycteria americana), Muscovy duck (Cairina moschata), snail kite (Rostrhamus sociabilis), orange oriole (Icterus auratus), hooded oriole (Icterus cucullatus), least tern (Sternula antillarum), crane hawk (Geranospiza caerulescens), common black hawk (Buteogallus anthracinus), black hawk-eagle (Spizaetus tyrannus), Yucatan amazon (Amazona xantholora), bat falcon (Falco rufigularis), ferruginous pygmy owl (Glaucidium brasilianum), least bittern (Ixobrychus exilis), reddish egret (Egretta rufescens), blue-winged teal (Spatula discors), northern pintail (Anas acuta), American wigeon (Mareca americana), lesser scaup (Aythya affinis), king vulture (Sarcoramphus papa), and hen harrier (Circus cyaneus).

The reserve is designated an Important bird area.

== Conservation ==
The area was designated a biosphere reserve in 1999 by the Mexican government. In 2004 it was designated a wetland of international importance under the Ramsar Convention.

In 2008 the Mexican government nominated the Los Petenes and adjacent Ría Celestún reserves as a World Heritage Site.
