= Conservation International Mexico =

Country programme of Conservation International in Mexico

- Conservación Internacional México
- Abbreviation: CI-México
- Formation: 1990
- Type: Country programme
- Headquarters: Mexico City, Mexico
- Region served: Mexico
- Fields: Biodiversity conservation; coastal and marine conservation; landscape restoration; conservation finance
- Parent organization: Conservation International
- Website: mexico.conservation.org

Conservation International Mexico (Conservación Internacional México) is the Mexico country programme of Conservation International. It has worked in Mexico since 1990.

Its work in Mexico has included landscape-scale biodiversity conservation, ecological land-use planning and landscape restoration in Oaxaca and Chiapas, coastal and marine conservation in Quintana Roo, the Gulf of California and the Yucatán Peninsula, and conservation finance initiatives linked to Mexico's biodiversity targets, including the Mex30x30 project and sustainable financial models for agroforestry and protected areas.

== Overview ==
Operating locally as Conservación Internacional México, A.C., the programme is headquartered in Mexico City and maintains offices in Oaxaca and Chiapas. Its geographic focus combines southern landscape work in Oaxaca and Chiapas with coastal and marine initiatives in Quintana Roo, the Gulf of California and the Yucatán Peninsula.

The programme's thematic work includes biodiversity conservation in priority landscapes, coastal and marine conservation, restoration, and conservation finance. In Oaxaca and Chiapas it has worked on forest restoration, biodiversity monitoring, and ecological land-use planning, while in Oaxaca, Chiapas and the Yucatán Peninsula it has also pursued sustainable financial models; more recent national finance work has included participation in the Mex30x30 project.

== History ==
Conservation International began working in Mexico in 1990.

From 1996 to 2003, CI Mexico participated in a USAID-supported coastal-management programme that combined site-based conservation with capacity building and broader integrated coastal management efforts in Quintana Roo and the Gulf of California.

== Programmes and operations ==
Selected programme locations mentioned in the article (1 Mexico City, 2 Oaxaca, 3 Chiapas, 4 Quintana Roo, 5 Gulf of California, and 6 Yucatán Peninsula)

=== National initiatives ===
Landscape-restoration work in Oaxaca and Chiapas promoted by Conservation International Mexico and partners has been included in Mexico's national restoration-information system, the Sistema Nacional de Información para la Restauración Ambiental (SNIRA), and its geospatial interface (HG‑SNIRA), maintained by the National Commission for the Knowledge and Use of Biodiversity (CONABIO). SNIRA compiles information from more than 4,500 restoration projects and experiences nationwide, and the HG‑SNIRA interface supports restoration planning by enabling users to consult more than 50 national-scale geospatial layers and generate automated diagnostic reports for areas of interest.

=== Oaxaca and Chiapas ===
In southern Mexico, Conservation International Mexico has worked on integrated landscape conservation in priority landscapes of Oaxaca and Chiapas through the GEF-financed project Conservation and Sustainable Use of Biological Diversity in Priority Landscapes of Oaxaca and Chiapas. The project applied an integrated landscape approach across three priority landscapes--the Sierra Madre de Chiapas, the Sierra Sur and Isthmus of Oaxaca, and the Pacific South Coast of Oaxaca and Chiapas--and combined biodiversity conservation with sustainable production across about 2.6 million hectares (26,000 km2). The same landscape approach was later tied to regional ecological land-use planning in both states and to restoration initiatives in Oaxaca and Chiapas.

In Chiapas, a 2019 decree established the Programa de Ordenamiento Ecológico Regional del Territorio de la Región Sierra Madre y Costa de Chiapas, covering 2,492,915 hectares (24,929 km2) and organising the planning framework around 990 Unidades de Gestión Ambiental (UGA). State reporting also described coordination activities for municipal participation in implementation of the regional ecological land-use programme.

In Oaxaca, terms of reference published by the state environment secretariat set out preparation of a regional ecological land-use programme for the Sierra Sur and Coast of Oaxaca as part of the same GEF project. The programme was defined for 76 municipalities and incorporated public consultation and consultation with Indigenous and Afro-Mexican communities as described in the document.

Conservation International Mexico presents landscape-restoration work in Oaxaca and Chiapas under the Restauración de Paisajes Emblemáticos initiative. The initiative has aimed to restore 17,657 hectares (177 km2) through methods including assisted natural regeneration and agroforestry systems.

=== Coastal and marine conservation ===
From 1996 to 2003, CI Mexico participated in a USAID-supported coastal-management programme that used site-based initiatives as entry points for broader integrated coastal management. The programme linked biodiversity conservation with capacity building and strategic innovation in coastal governance, and sought to build upward from local coastal opportunities toward wider collaboration in resource management and decision-making.

In Quintana Roo, work around Xcalak, Costa Maya and Chetumal Bay contributed to the establishment and active management of Xcalak Reefs National Park, training for authorities reviewing tourism developments, and capacity-building with the University of Quintana Roo and other local actors around bay management and coastal planning.

On Mexico's Pacific coast and in the Gulf of California, the programme also supported integrated bay management in Bahía Santa María, development of good practices for shrimp mariculture and marina projects, and broader regional-governance efforts for coastal resource management.

=== Yucatán Peninsula ===
In Campeche's Isla Arena, within the Ría Celestún Biosphere Reserve, Conservation International Mexico and the National Commission of Natural Protected Areas (CONANP) carried out a pilot community mangrove-restoration project aimed at restoring 217 hectares (2.17 km2) of degraded mangroves. The work centered on hydrological restoration to re-establish water flow in affected areas, and later reporting on the same project described community members digging channels to support mangrove recovery after road construction had disrupted local hydrology.

Selected programme landscapes and locations of Conservation International Mexico
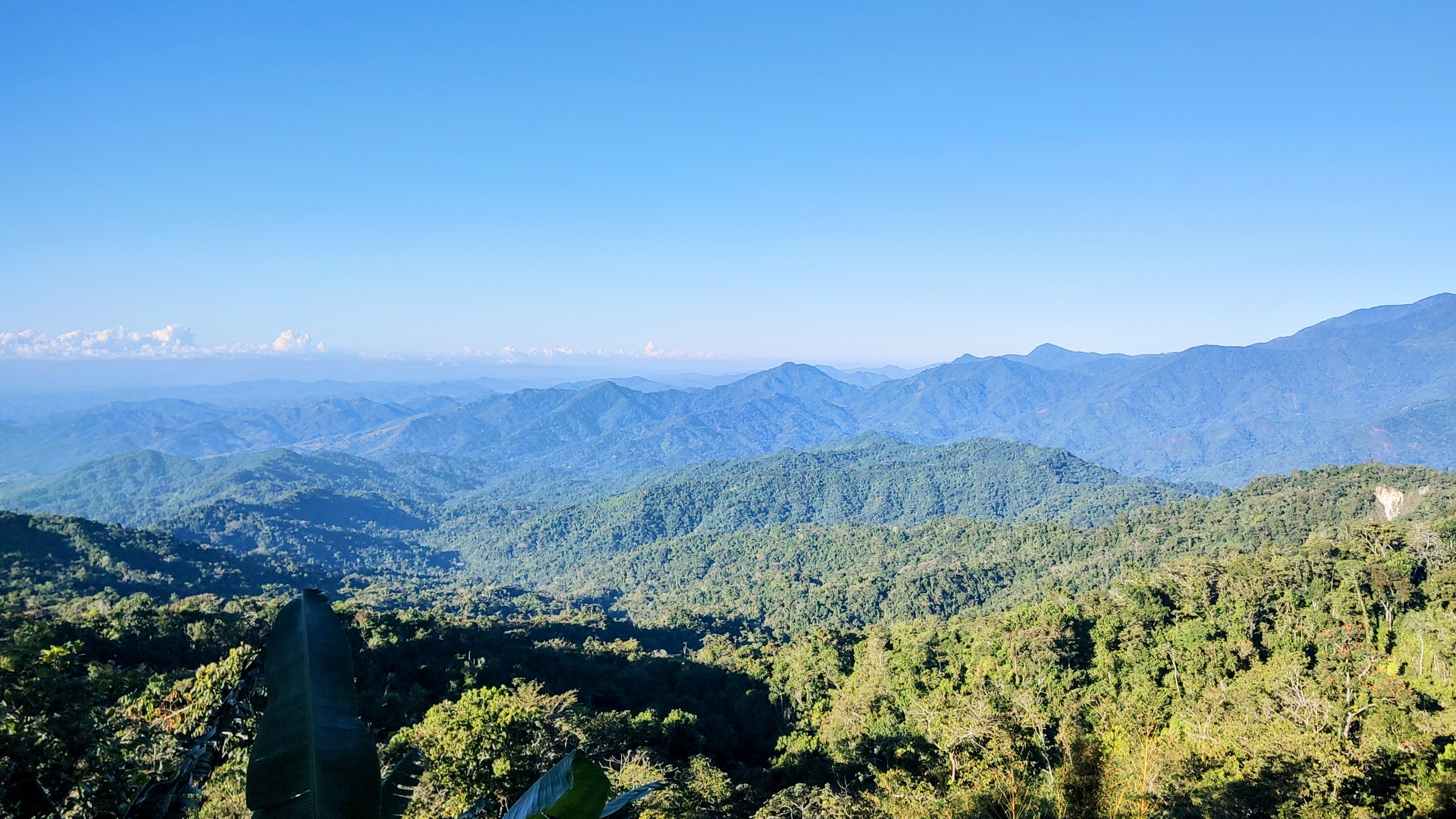
The Sierra Sur of Oaxaca, part of the southern Mexico landscape region where CI Mexico has supported restoration and ecological land-use planning

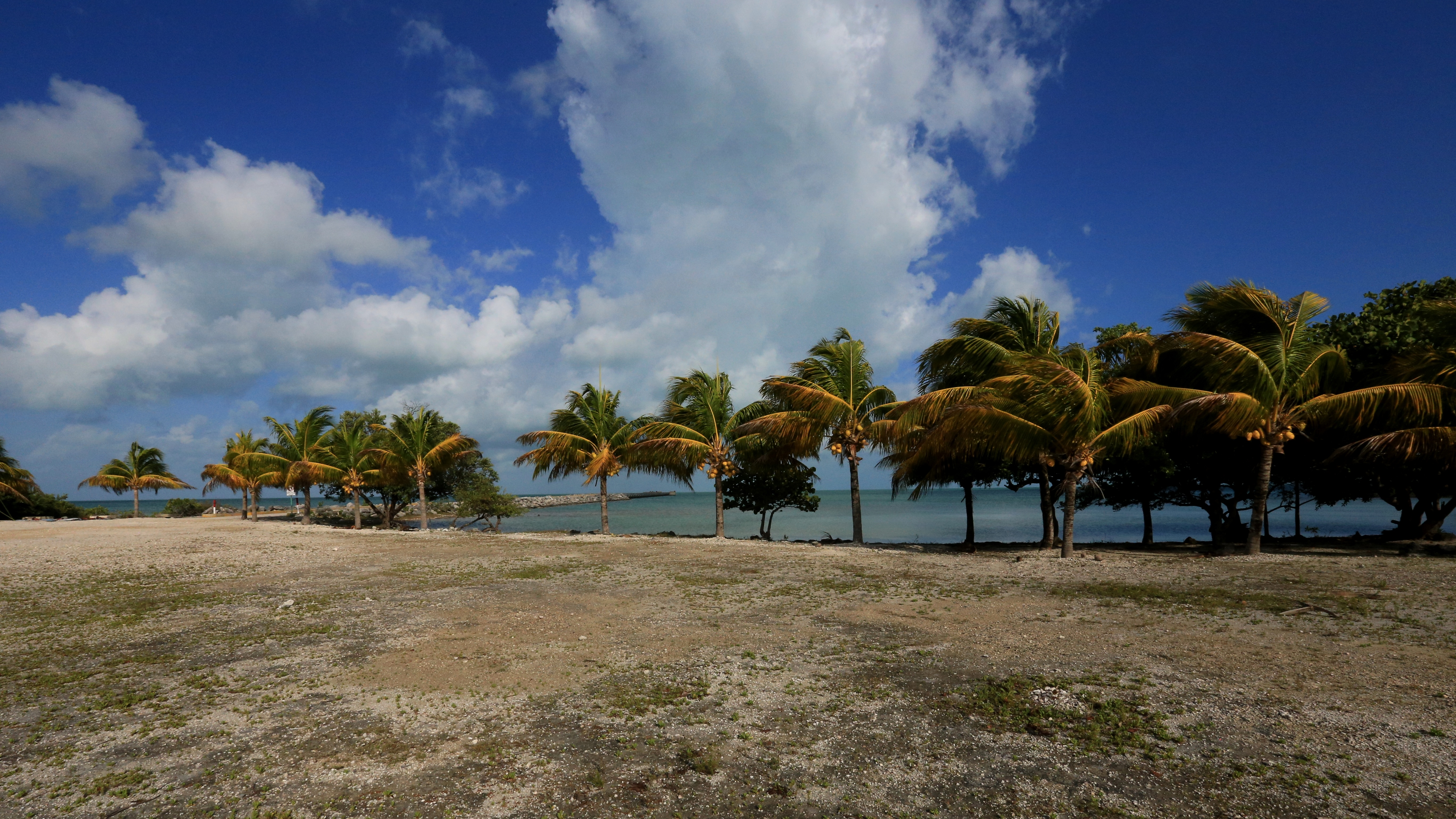
La Aguada de Xcalak, Quintana Roo, in the Costa Maya coastal region

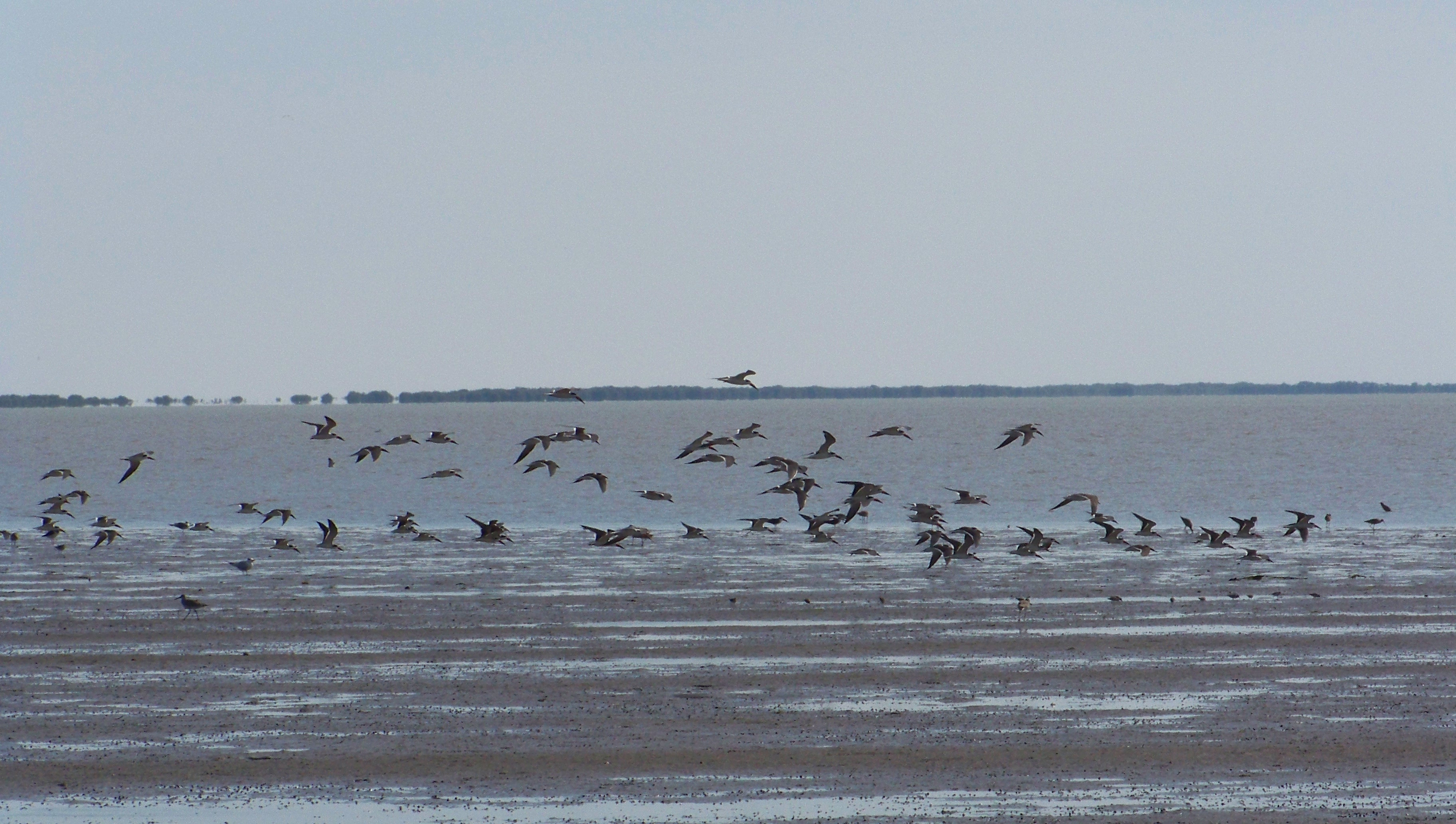
Shorebirds at La Reforma, Sinaloa, on Santa María Bay in the Gulf of California

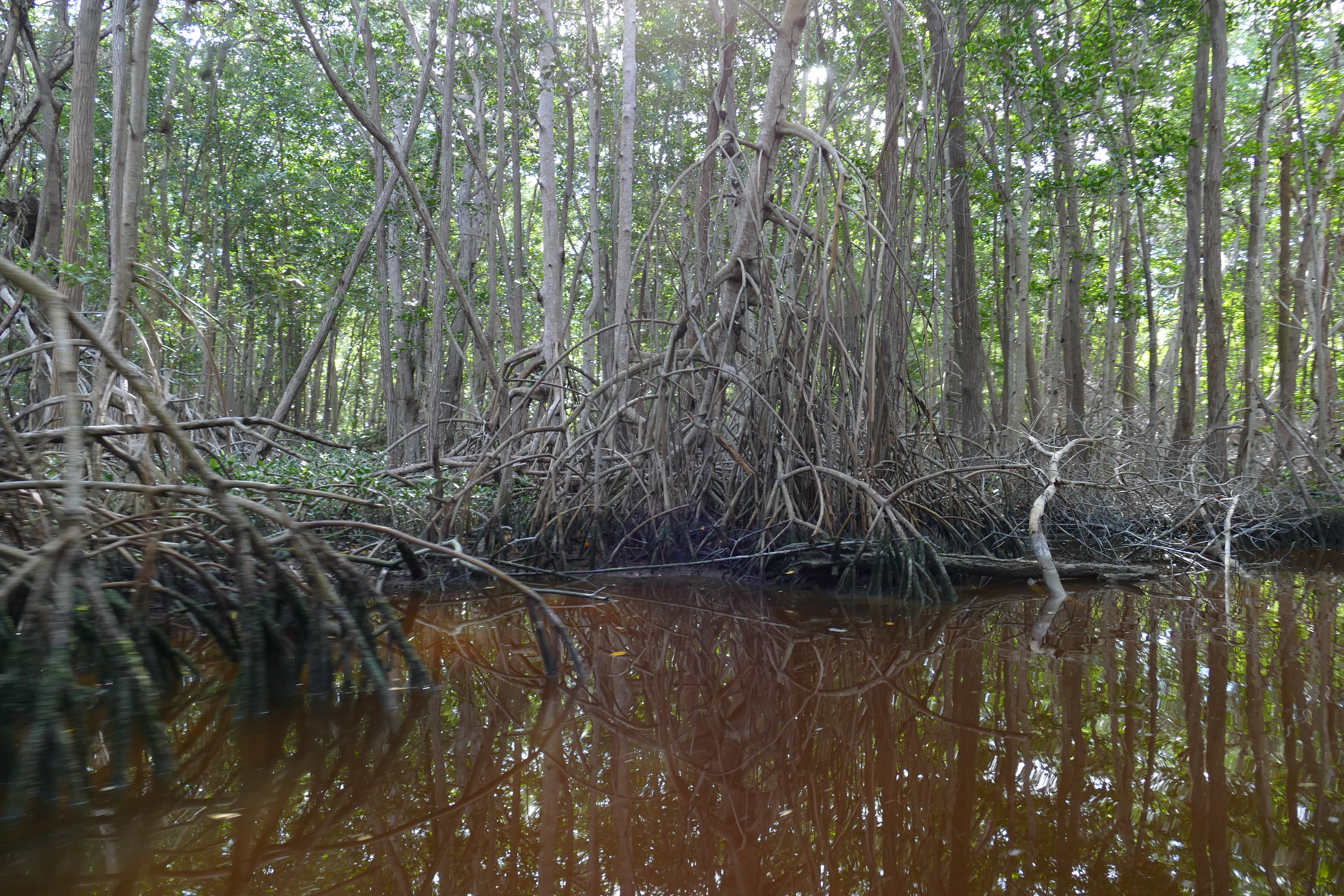
White mangrove in the Ría Celestun Biosphere Reserve, where CI Mexico and CONANP have worked on mangrove restoration around Isla Arena

== Partnerships ==
Recurring public-sector and finance partners in CI Mexico's work have included CONANP in southern landscapes, mangrove restoration and the Mex30x30 project; state-level environment authorities in Chiapas and Oaxaca in regional ecological land-use planning; and international finance architecture linked to the Global Environment Facility and the Global Biodiversity Framework Fund. For Mex30x30, project materials identify Conservation International as implementing agency, Fondo Mexicano para la Conservación de la Naturaleza (FMCN) as the organization that will conduct the project from 2025 to 2030, and CONANP as government partner.

Recurring local, community and technical partners have included municipal authorities participating in ecological land-use planning in Chiapas, Indigenous and Afro-Mexican communities consulted in Oaxaca's regional ecological-ordering process, community and academic actors involved in coastal-management work in Quintana Roo, and local community members participating in mangrove-restoration work in Isla Arena.

== Funding and conservation finance ==
Conservation finance linked to CI Mexico's work has included Mex30x30, approved in 2024 under the Global Biodiversity Framework Fund with GBFF financing of US$16,672,477 and a reported total project value of US$115.54 million. Under the approved structure, Conservation International is the implementing agency, FMCN is to conduct the project from 2025 to 2030, and CONANP is the government partner. The project was presented as the first GBFF project to be executed and as a mechanism to advance Mexico's 30x30 target through long-term financing for existing national protected areas and Areas Voluntarily Designated for Conservation (ADVCs).

Project documentation describes a financing model that combines strengthening CONANP's ability to expand revenue streams—including federal appropriations, entrance and user fees, payment for ecosystem services and compensations—with a long-term financing mechanism following a Project Finance for Permanence approach. The same design includes a transition fund to cover financing gaps while public revenue streams grow and an endowment for selected protected areas and ADVCs, including an ADVC complex in the Chimalapas region of Oaxaca.

In southern Mexico, the Oaxaca-Chiapas landscape project also included measures intended to support the long-term financial sustainability of integrated landscape management, and programme materials state that in Oaxaca, Chiapas and the Yucatán Peninsula CI Mexico is developing sustainable financial models for the agroforestry sector intended to benefit small-scale growers and direct investment toward projects that reduce deforestation.

== Impact and evaluation ==
A retrospective assessment of the 1996–2003 coastal-management programme framed the initiative around four intermediate results: getting site-based management efforts underway, encouraging lower-impact coastal practices, developing policy options, and building organizational capacity. It concluded that Xcalak and Bahía Santa María met their results targets over the life of the project, while Chetumal Bay made rapid progress in its later stages, and treated site-based pilots as an effective starting point for broader integrated coastal management in Mexico.

The same assessment identified stronger results where work focused on locally compelling issues, built engaged local teams, and linked planning to implementation, behavior change and continuous monitoring. It highlighted the growth of co-management arrangements, networks and coalitions as important institutional gains, and treated the incorporation of low-impact development practices into the Costa Maya regional ecological programme and state guidance as a notable policy outcome. At the same time, it concluded that broader coastal-governance reform had advanced more slowly than expected, that some NGO-led efforts placed too little emphasis on direct engagement with influential government agencies, and that bottom-up and top-down strategies still needed to converge for wider adoption.
