= Yucatán moist forests =

Tropical moist broadleaf forest ecoregion in Mexico

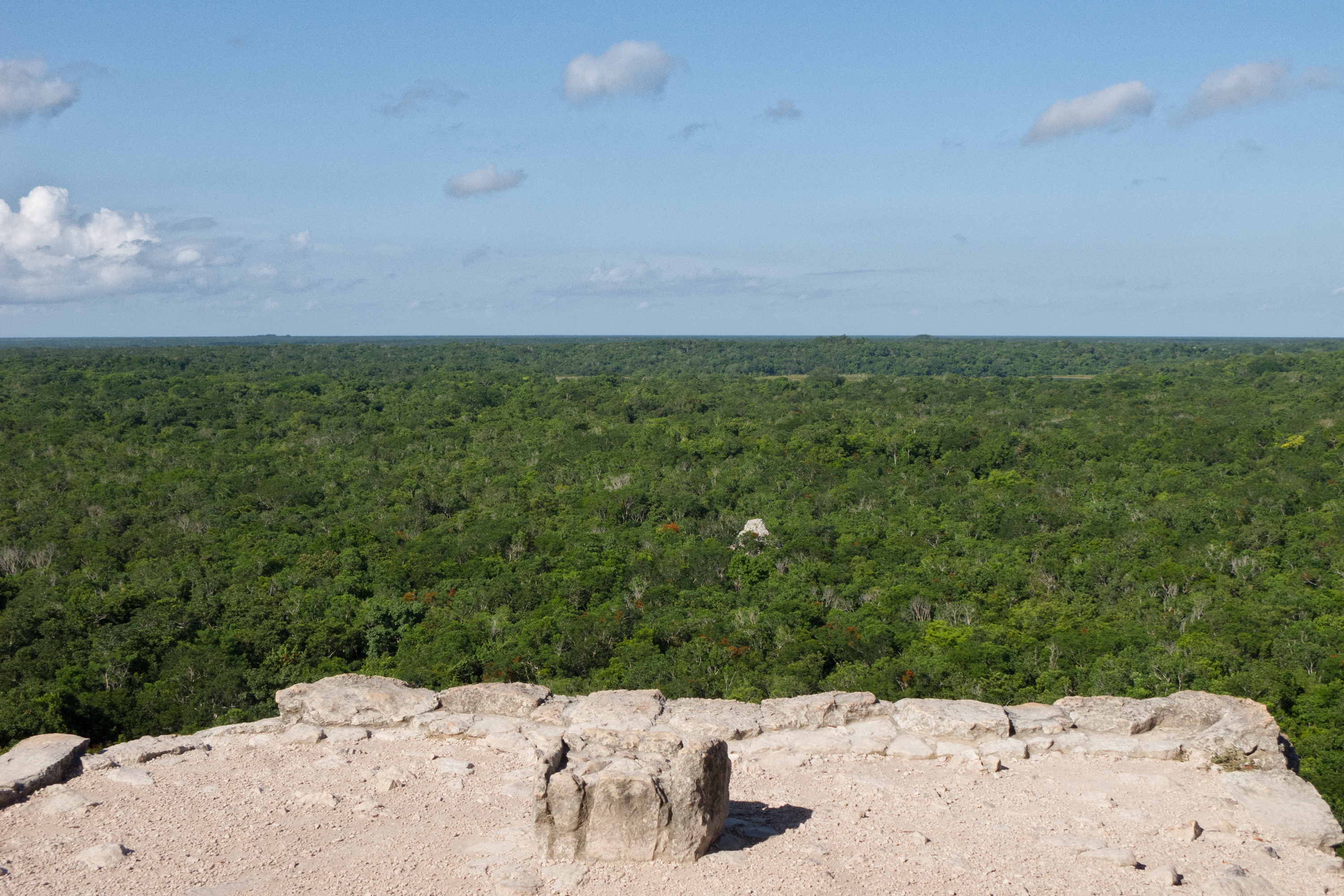
- Forests surrounding the ancient Maya city of Cobá in the northeast of the Yucatán Peninsula.

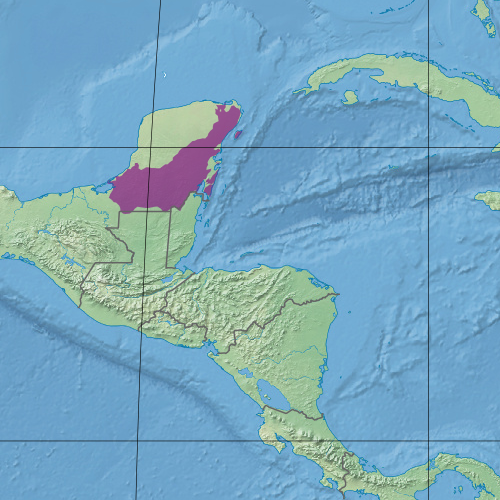
- Ecoregion territory (in purple)

Ecology
- Realm: Neotropical
- Biome: tropical and subtropical moist broadleaf forests
- Borders: List: Mayan Corridor mangroves; Pantanos de Centla; Petén–Veracruz moist forests; Ría Lagartos mangroves; Usumacinta mangroves; Yucatán dry forests

Geography
- Area: 69,849 km^{2} (26,969 mi^{2})
- Countries: southeastern Mexico; Guatemala; Belize

Conservation
- Conservation status: Vulnerable
- Protected: 23.5%

The Yucatán moist forests are an ecoregion of the tropical and subtropical moist broadleaf forests biome, as defined by the World Wildlife Fund.

It is found in the Yucatán Peninsula in southern Mexico, northern Guatemala, and small adjacent parts of extreme northern Belize.

== Geography ==
The ecoregion covers an area of 69,849 square kilometres (26,969 sq mi). It has little topographic relief. Porous limestone underlies much of the ecoregion, and it has few permanent rivers despite its humid climate.

It is bounded on the northwest by the semi-arid Yucatán dry forests. The Petén–Veracruz moist forests lie to the south.

== Climate ==
The ecoregion has a tropical humid climate. Average annual rainfall ranges from 1000 to 1500 mm, generally lower in the north and higher in the south and east. Rainfall varies seasonally, with September and October the rainiest months.

== Flora ==
The most common plant communities are high and medium semi-evergreen forest. The trees form a canopy 20 to 35 meters high. Approximately 25 to 50% of the trees lose their leaves during the annual dry season. Manilkara zapota is the most common forest tree; others include Brosimum alicastrum, Pimenta dioica, Lonchocarpus castilloi, Pouteria campechiana, Swietenia macrophylla, Alseis yucatanensis, Zuelania guidonia, Cedrela odorata, Swartzia cubensis, Orbignya cohune, Aspidosperma desmanthum, and Aspidosperma megalocarpon.

Low flooded semi-evergreen forest grows in seasonally-flooded areas known as bajos. The canopy is 8 to 10 meters high, and about half the trees lose their leaves during the dry season. Typical trees include Cameraria latifolia, Vachellia pringlei, Dalbergia glabra, Pisonia aculeata, Pithecellobium dulce, Pseudophoenix sargentii, Haematoxylon campechianum, and Acoelorraphe wrightii. Ferns and epiphytes are common.

== Fauna ==
Large grazing mammals include the Central American tapir (Tapirus bairdii), white-lipped peccary (Tayassu pecari), collared peccary (Dicotyles tajacu) white-tailed deer (Odocoileus virginianus), Yucatan brown brocket deer (Mazama pandora), and Central American red brocket deer (Mazama temama).

There are five species of felids in the ecoregion – jaguar (Panthera onca), puma (Puma concolor), ocelot (Leopardus pardalis), jaguarundi (Herpailurus yagouaroundi), and margay (Leopardus wiedii).

Native primates include the Yucatan spider monkey (Ateles geoffroyi yucatanensis) and Guatemalan black howler (Alouatta pigra).

Yucatán endemic birds, not necessarily limited to the ecoregion, include the ocellated turkey (Meleagris ocellata), Yucatan nightjar (Antrostomus badius), Yucatán woodpecker (Melanerpes pygmaeus), Yucatan poorwill (Nyctiphrynus yucatanicus), yellow-lored parrot (Amazona xantholora), Yucatan flycatcher (Myiarchis yucatanensis), Yucatan jay (Cyanocorax yucatanicus), rose-throated tanager (Piranga roseogularis), and orange oriole (Icterus auratus). Three bird species are endemic to Cozumel - the Cozumel emerald (Chlorostilbon forficatus), Cozumel vireo (Vireo bairdi), and Cozumel thrasher (Toxostoma guttatum).

== Conservation and threats ==
Although some protection exists, the ecoregion is under threat by logging and cattle farming.

== Protected areas ==
23.5% of the ecoregion is in protected areas. Protected areas include Sian Ka'an Biosphere Reserve, Tulum National Park, Ría Lagartos Biosphere Reserve, Laguna de Términos Flora and Fauna Protection Area, Uaymil Flora and Fauna Protection Area, Yum Balam Flora and Fauna Protection Area, Balam-Kin, and El Zapotal Voluntary Conservation Area.

== See also ==
- List of ecoregions in Mexico
