= Ría Lagartos mangroves =

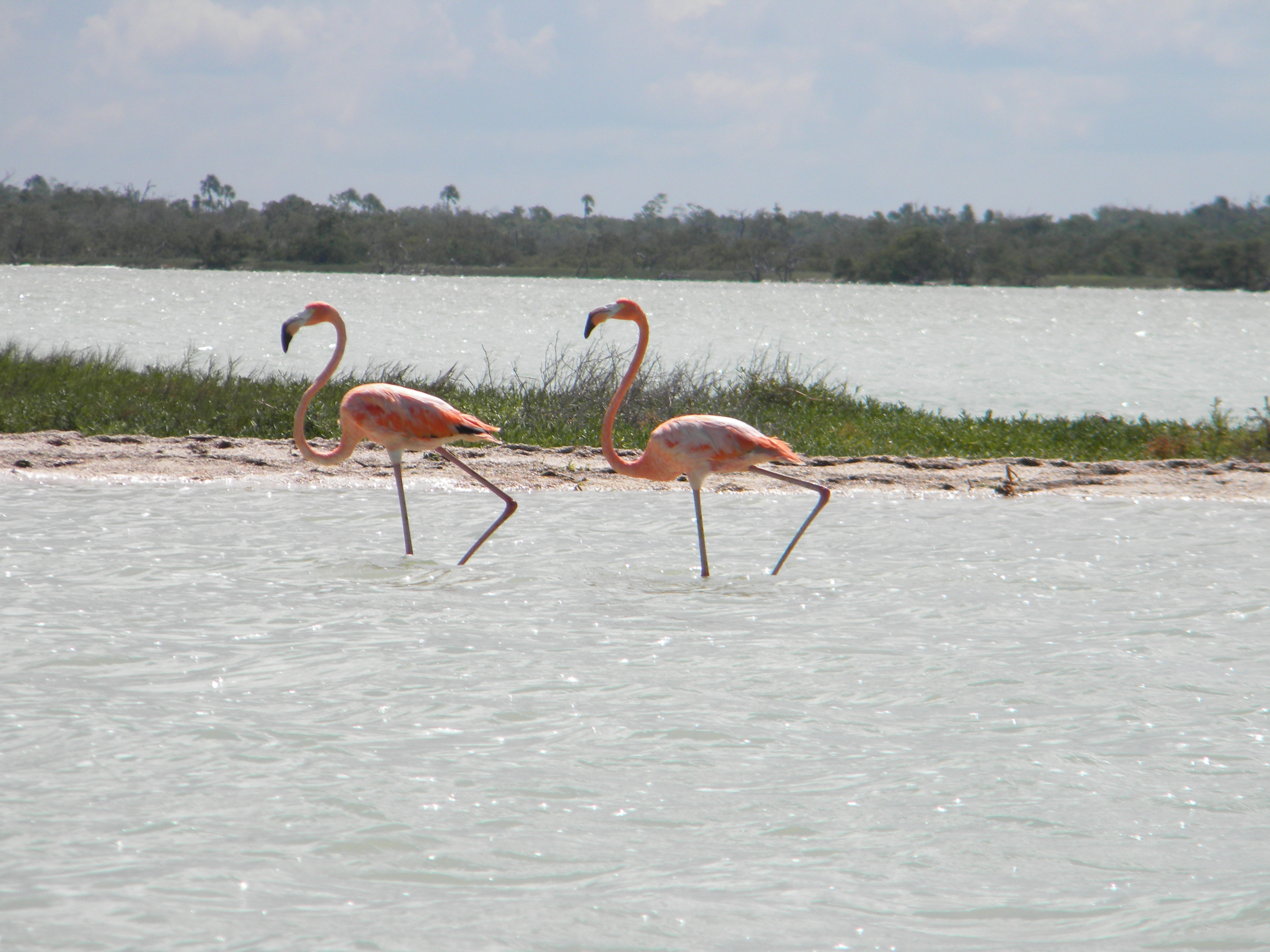
- American flamingo (Phoenicopterus ruber)

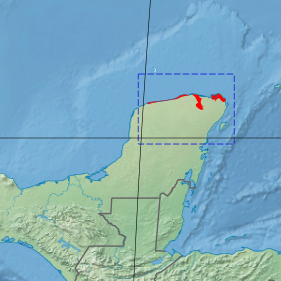
- Ecoregion territory (in red)

Ecology
- Realm: Neotropical
- Biome: Mangroves
- Borders: Yucatán dry forests; Yucatán moist forests

Geography
- Area: 3,626 km^{2} (1,400 sq mi)
- Country: Mexico
- Coordinates: 21.6°N 88.08°W

The Ría Lagartos mangroves ecoregion (WWF ID: NT1430) covers mangrove habitats of along the northern coast of the Yucatan Peninsula, including the Ria Lagartos Lagoon ('Ria' meaning lagoon). A prominent section of the ecoregion is covered by the Ría Lagartos Biosphere Reserve. The site is an important area for migratory birds, fish, and sea turtles.

== Location and description ==
The ecoregion stretches across 300 km of the northeastern coast of the Yucatan Peninsula, from the coastal town of Chelem in the west to the coastal lagoons north of Cancun. The region also reaches inland for 50 km on flat land south of Playa las Coloradas. The distinctive character of the mangroves is partly due to the karst (limestone) topography and freshwater source. The ecoregion is surrounded on the land side by the Yucatan dry forests ecoregion.

== Climate ==
The climate of the ecoregion is Tropical savanna climate - dry winter (Köppen climate classification (Aw)). This climate is characterized by relatively even temperatures throughout the year, and a pronounced dry season. The driest month has less than 60 mm of precipitation, and is drier than the average month.

== Flora and fauna ==
Characteristic tree species of the ecoregion are the red mangrove (Rhizophora mangle) and the black mangrove (Avicennia germinans). Mangroves are found in two general types: pygmy mangroves (plants under 2 meters in height), and fringe mangroves (where trees may reach 20 meters.)

Over 280 species of aquatic birds have been recorded in the region, include the cormorant (Phalacrocorax), wood stork (Mycteria americana), boat-billed heron (Cochlearius cochlearia), and the white egret (Egretta alba). 73 fish species are supported by the mangroves of the region.

== Protected areas ==
Officially protected areas of the ecoregion include:

- Ría Lagartos Biosphere Reserve
- Reserva Estatal de Dzilam de Bravo
