= Petenes mangroves =

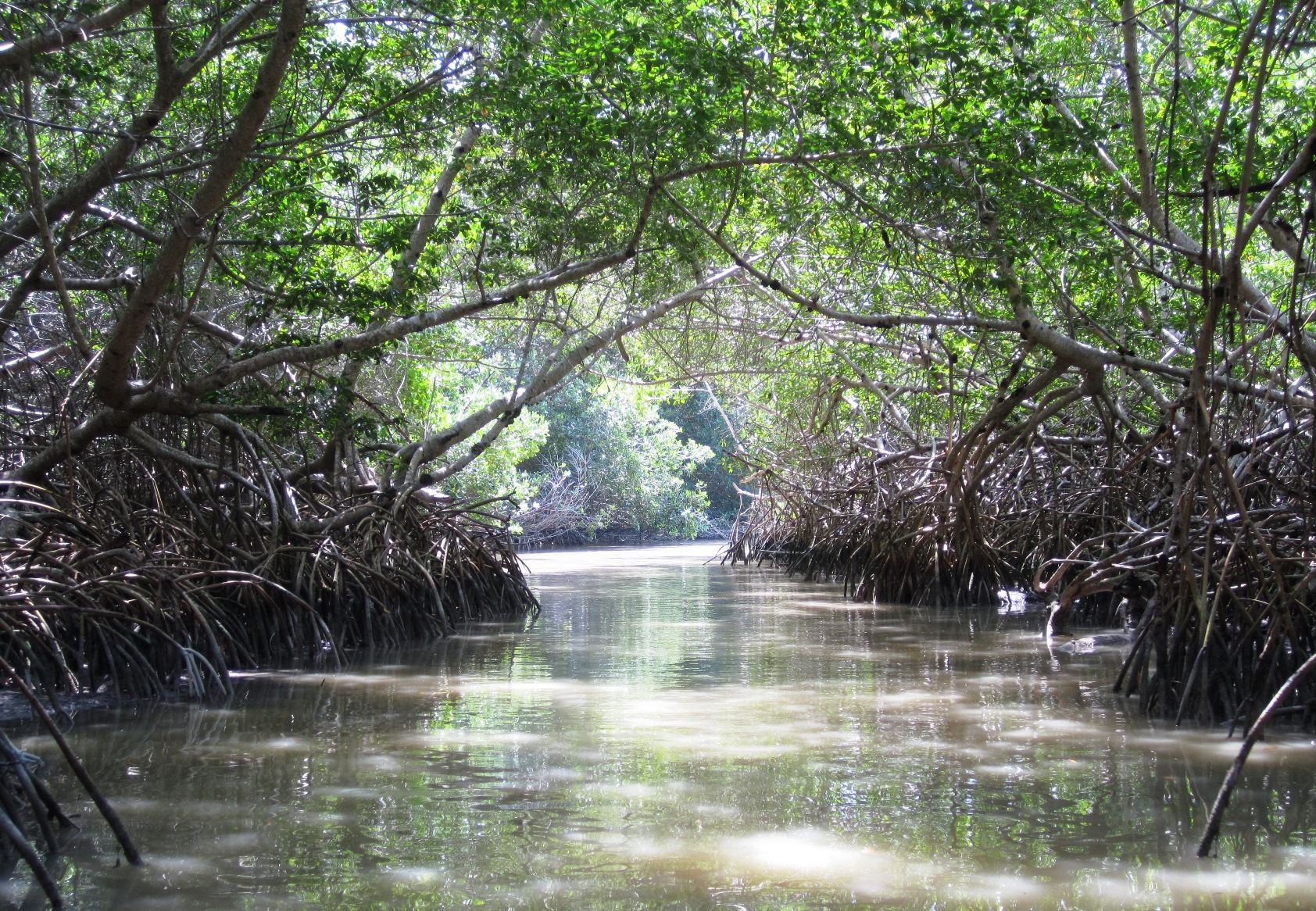
- Mangrove forest in Ría Celestún Biosphere Reserve

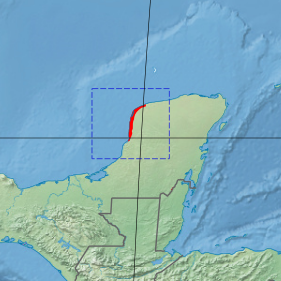
- Ecoregion territory (in red)

Ecology
- Realm: Neotropic
- Biome: Mangroves

Geography
- Area: 2,072 km^{2} (800 sq mi)
- Country: Mexico
- Coordinates: 20.66°N 90.37°W

The Petenes mangroves ecoregion (WWF ID: NT1428) covers mangrove habitat along the Gulf of Mexico coast of southern Mexico, where Campeche state and Yucatan state meet, centering on the Celestun Lagoon inland from the barrier-island town of Celestún. Because the region has relatively little rainfall and no rivers feeding the lagoons, the freshwater to support the mangrove ecosystem springs from underground aquifers. The area is important for migratory birds (there are five areas in this one small ecoregion that have been designated as important bird areas), and as a nesting area for sea turtles. The area around the Celestun Lagoon is protected by the Ría Celestún Biosphere Reserve, a UNESCO Biosphere Reserve, and Los Petenes Biosphere Reserve in Campeche.

== Location and description ==
The ecoregion stretches along 150 km of coastal, from the town of Campeche City to Sisal, Yucatán. The ecoregion only reaches about 10 km inland, to where the salt water influence ends. The region is surrounded inland by the Yucatan dry forests ecoregion. The area is relatively well-preserved, with only two small towns on the coast in the ecoregion.

'Peten mangroves' are a particular type of mangrove association of plants, featuring irregular hummocks of non-mangrove tree species within the regular mangrove. The ecosystem draws freshwater from openings in the underlying karst, mixing with saline seawater. The coast along the western side of the Yucatan peninsula is within the Los Petenes Biosphere Reserve.

== Climate ==
The climate of the ecoregion is Tropical monsoon climate (Köppen climate classification (Am)). This climate is characterized by relatively even temperatures throughout the year (all months being greater than 18 °C (64 °F) average temperature), and a pronounced dry season. The driest month has less than 60 mm of precipitation, but more than (100-(average/25) mm. This climate is mid-way between a tropical rainforest and a tropical savannah. The dry month usually at or right after the winter solstice in the Northern Hemisphere. Precipitation in the ecoregion averages 450 mm/year.

== Flora and fauna ==
A variety of habitats exist in the ecoregion, including mangroves, seagrass beds, coastal dunes, marshlands, low flooded forests, saline coastal lagoons, small estuaries, coastal inlets, and karst caves. Long barrier islands protect the inland lagoons and margins, which are frequently flooded. the most common tree species are red mangrove (Rhizophora mangle) and white mangrove (Laguncularia racemosa). Associated species include swamp sawgrass (Cladium jamaicensis), southern cattail (Typha domingensis), dwarf saltwort (Salicornia bigelovii), and beachwort (Batis maritima).

304 species of birds have been recorded in the region, most notably American flamingo (Phoenicopterus ruber). The importance of mangroves as protective areas for fish is illustrated by the 107 species of fish that have been recorded.

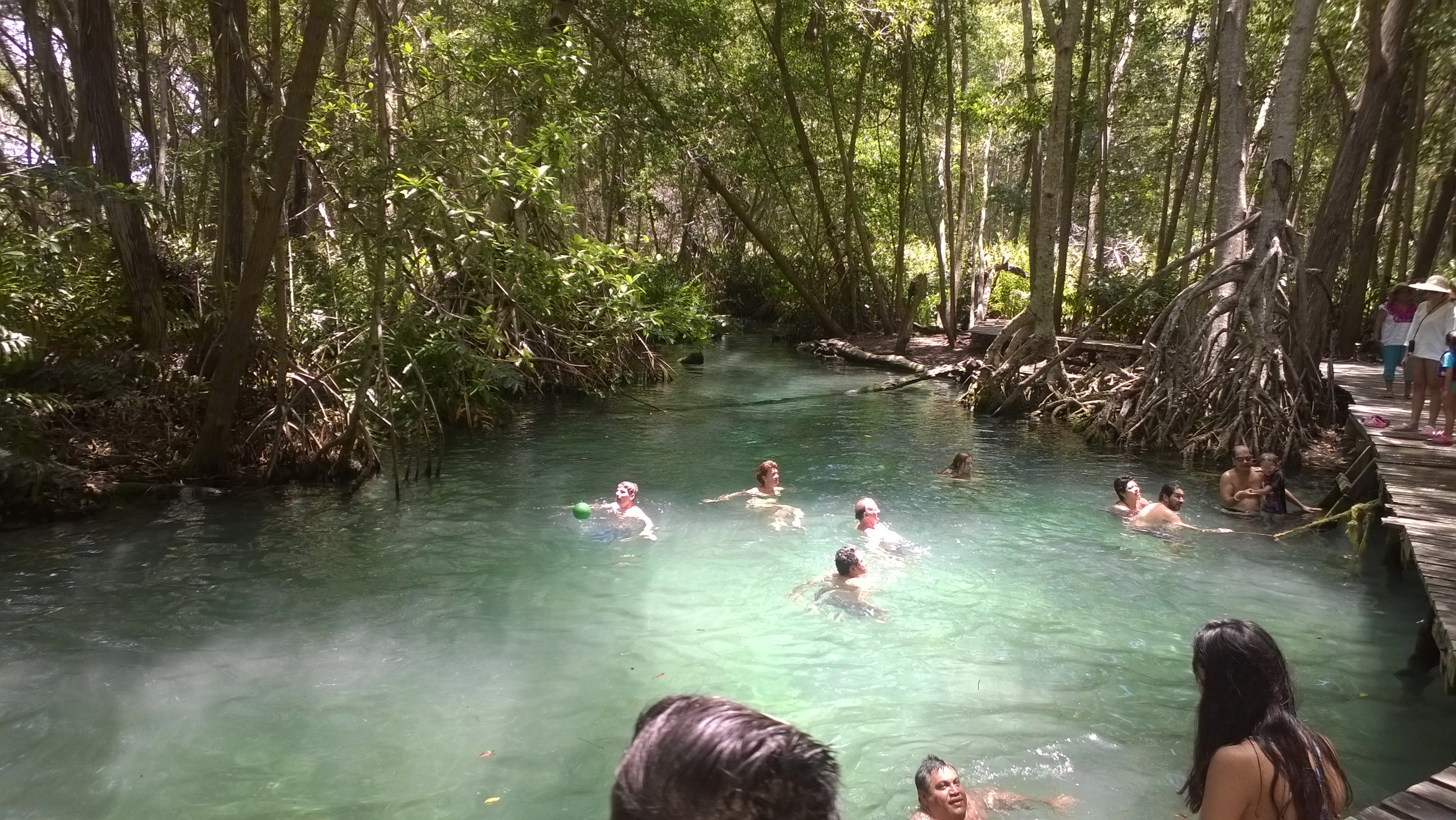
Swimming at Ojo de Agua Baldiosera, Ría Celestún Biosphere Reserve

== Protected areas ==
Officially protected areas in the ecoregion include:

- Ría Celestún Biosphere Reserve
- Los Petenes Biosphere Reserve
