= Celestún =

Town in the Mexican state of Yucatán

Celestun
- Town
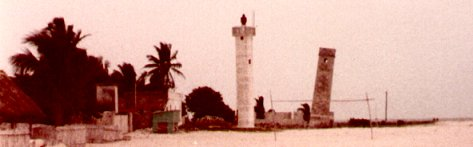

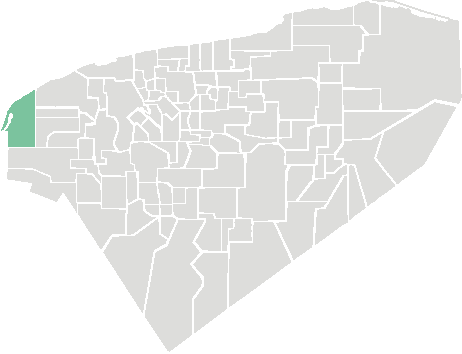

- Location within Yucatán (state) Location within Mexico
- Coordinates: 20°51′30″N 90°24′0″W
- Country: Mexico
- State: Yucatán

Government
  - Municipal President: Araci Guadalupe Villanueva Pinto

Population (2005)
  - Total: 6,269
- Municipality
- Time zone: UTC-6 (Central Standard Time)
- INEGI Code: 011
- Major Airport: Merida (Manuel Crescencio Rejón) International Airport
- IATA Code: MID
- ICAO Code: MMMD
- Website: Nuestros municipios - Celestún

Celestún is a town in Yucatán, Mexico. It is located in the northwest corner of the state, just north of the border with the state of Campeche, on the Gulf of Mexico.

== On the town ==
In 2000, it had a population of just under 6,000 people; however, the population swells to 10,000 during the octopus hunting season. It is mostly a fishing town, with a 19th-century lighthouse (as well as a more modern one) and an abandoned historic hacienda. Besides fishing, Celestún also produces salt, as it has done from pre-Columbian times. Tourism is also making up an increasing portion of the town's economy, as the community has many kilometers of sand beaches and abundant wildlife.

One of the busiest times for tourism is Holy Week, when people from around the region visit Celestun. Local folk-catholic traditions are abundant during this time, when the town's patron saint is floated out to sea surrounded by candles, and visited by the patron saint of nearby Kinchil. There is a church in the town built during the colonial period

As the town of Celestun is the seat of the municipality (municipio) of Celestun, it attracts various carnivals, dances and musicians to its town square on a regular basis.

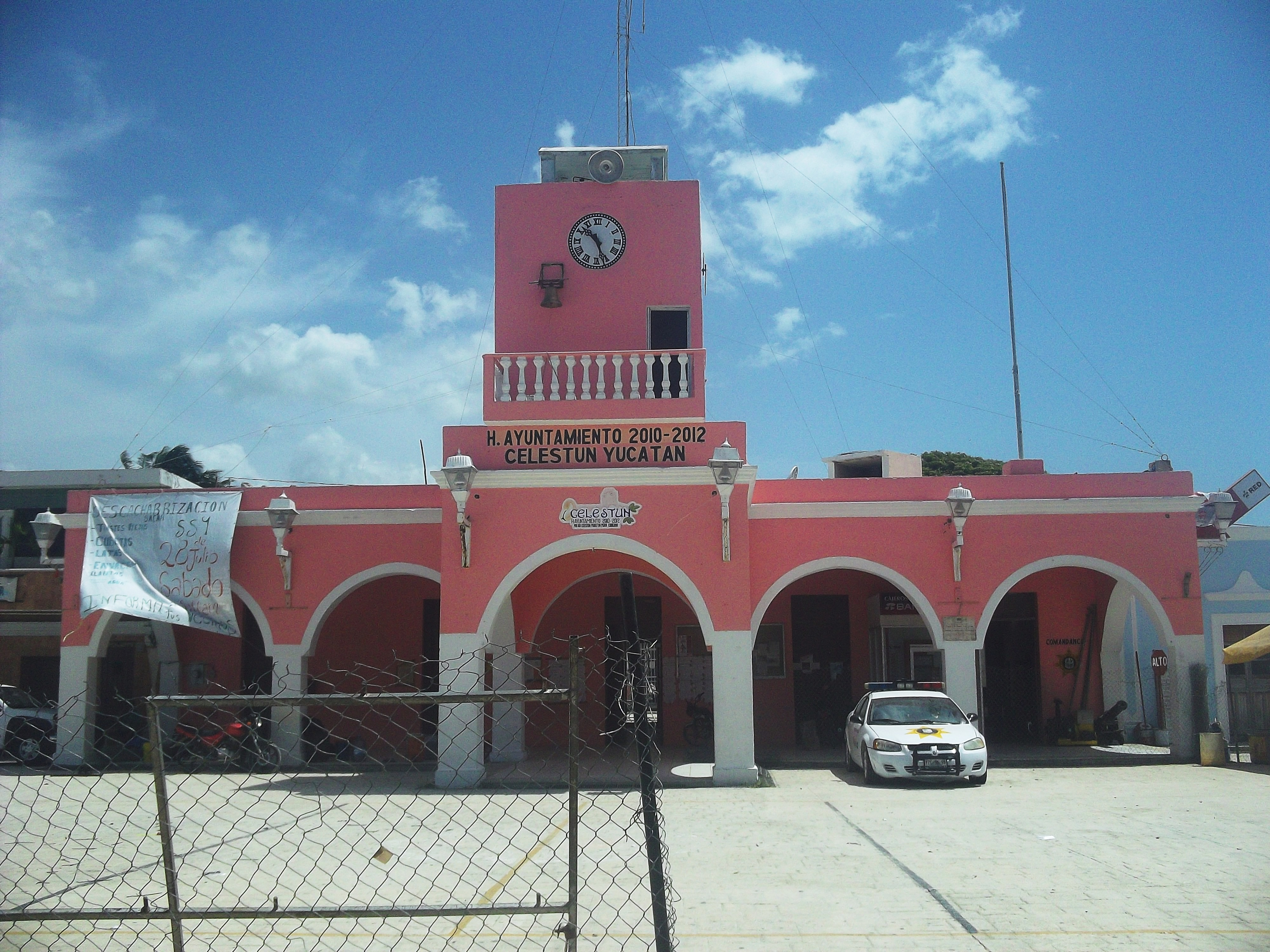
City hall, in Celestún

== Geography ==
It is located in the northwest corner of the state, just north of the border with the state of Campeche.

Surrounding the town is the 147,500-acre (600 km^{2}) Ría Celestún Biosphere Reserve, a wetland reserve that is the winter home to vast flocks of flamingos, as well as many herons and other bird species. This location is set within the Petenes mangroves ecoregion. In addition, more than 200 species of birds pass through on migration, or live there. Celestun's ecosystem is unique because of a combination of freshwater from the century estuary and saltwater from the Gulf of Mexico. The reserve also has two types of pelicans - large white Canadian and smaller gray Mexican ones. Celestun is also known as a hatching ground for endangered sea turtles. Wildlife conservationists have an ongoing project to protect the sea turtles from encroaching modernization.

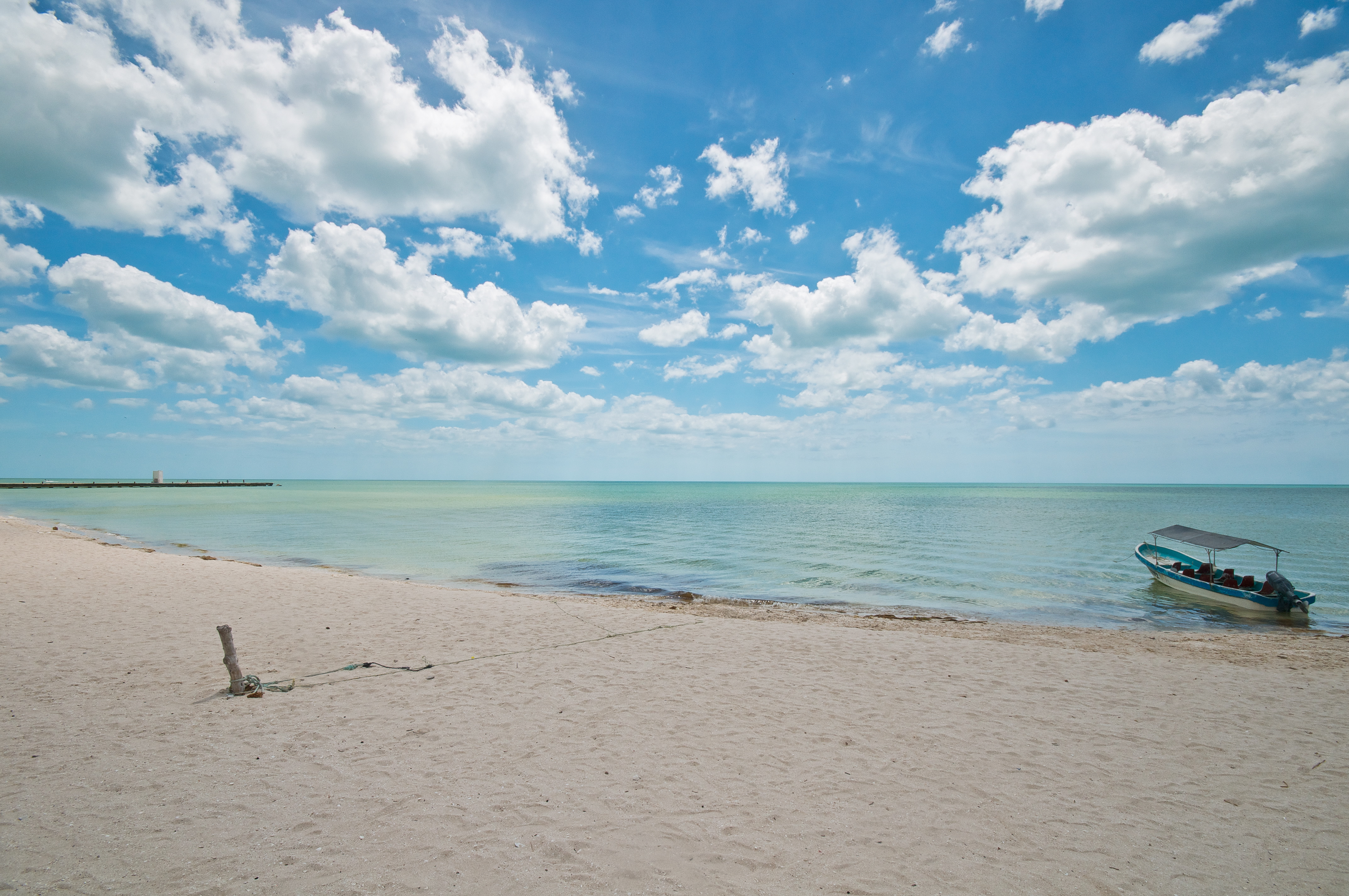
A beach in Celestún

=== Climate ===
Climate data for Celestún
Month	Jan	Feb	Mar	Apr	May	Jun	Jul	Aug	Sep	Oct	Nov	Dec	Year
Mean daily maximum °C (°F)	29 (84)	29.9 (85.8)	32 (90)	34.3 (93.7)	35 (95)	34.3 (93.7)	33.8 (92.8)	33.5 (92.3)	32.9 (91.2)	31.7 (89.1)	30.2 (86.4)	29.1 (84.4)	32 (90)
Mean daily minimum °C (°F)	17.3 (63.1)	17.6 (63.7)	19.0 (66.2)	20.7 (69.3)	22 (72)	22.5 (72.5)	22 (72)	22.3 (72.1)	22.4 (72.3)	21.7 (71.1)	20 (68)	18.0 (64.4)	20.5 (68.9)
Average precipitation cm (inches)	2.5 (1)	2.0 (0.8)	0.76 (0.3)	1.0 (0.4)	3.6 (1.4)	11 (4.3)	12 (4.9)	12 (4.8)	14 (5.7)	8.6 (3.4)	3.3 (1.3)	2.8 (1.1)	75 (29.4)
Source: Weatherbase

=== Ecological park ===
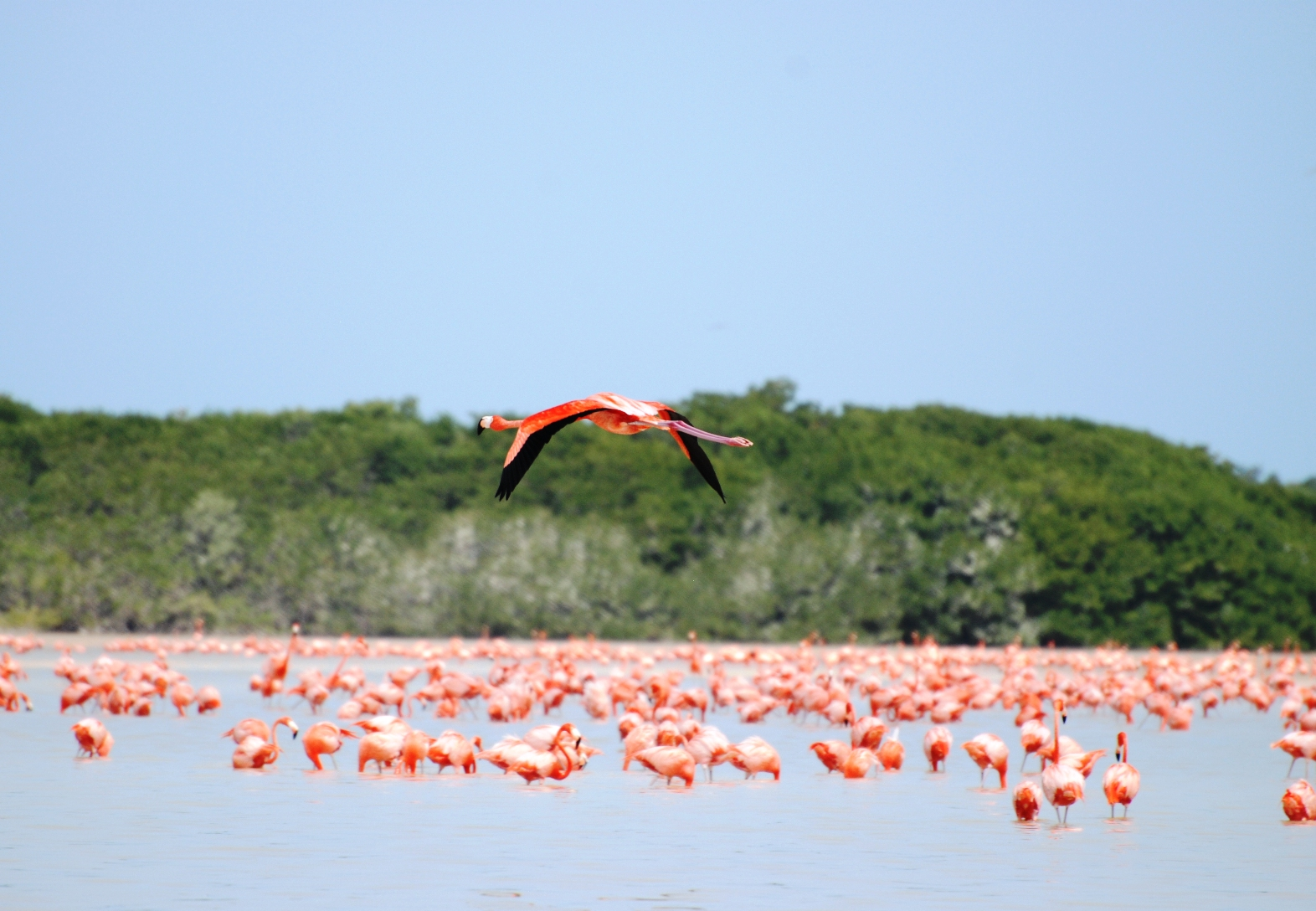
Flamingo flying near Celestun

Nearby there is the Ría Celestun Biosphere Reserve.

== Gallery ==
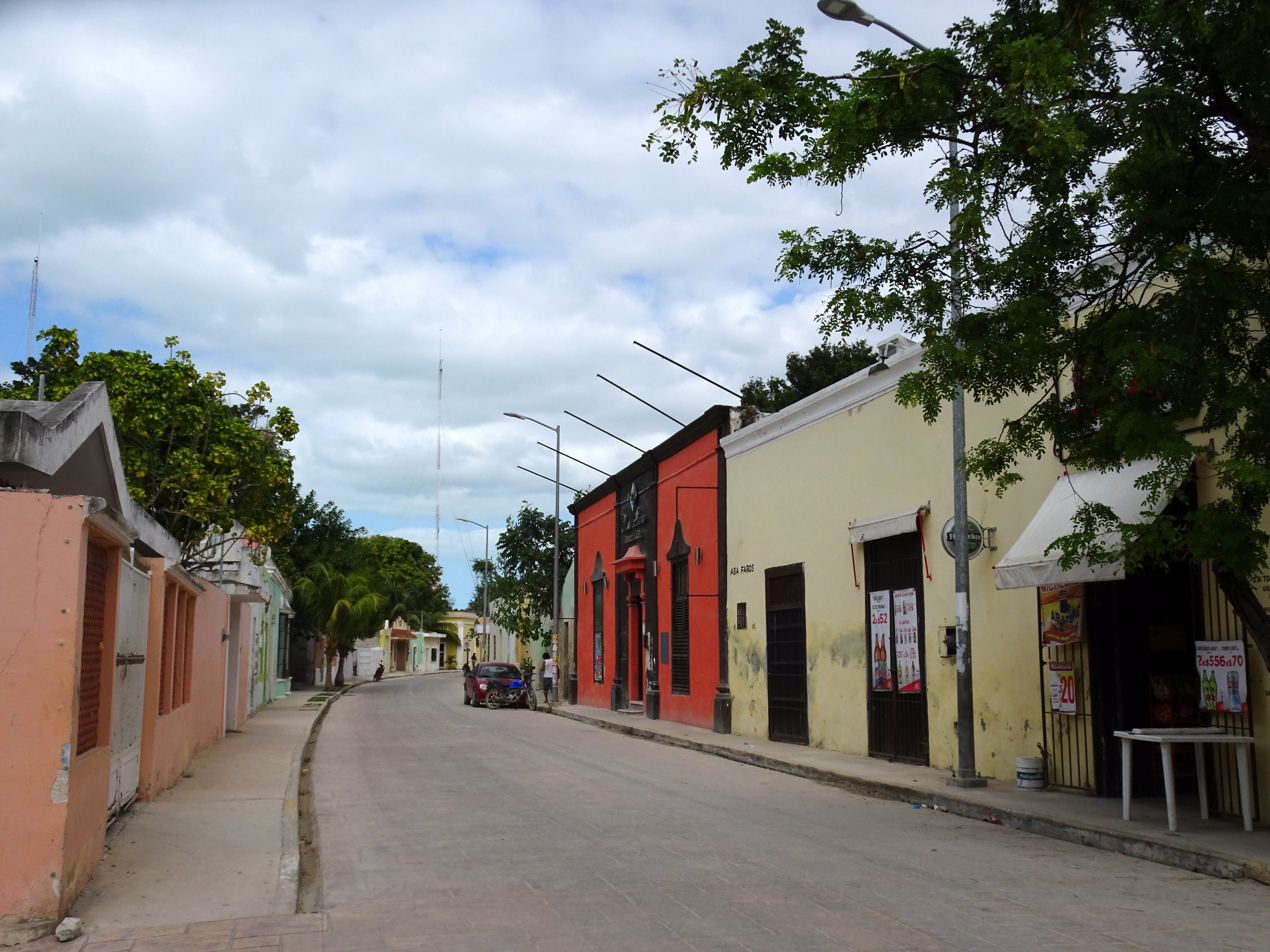
Street in Celestún

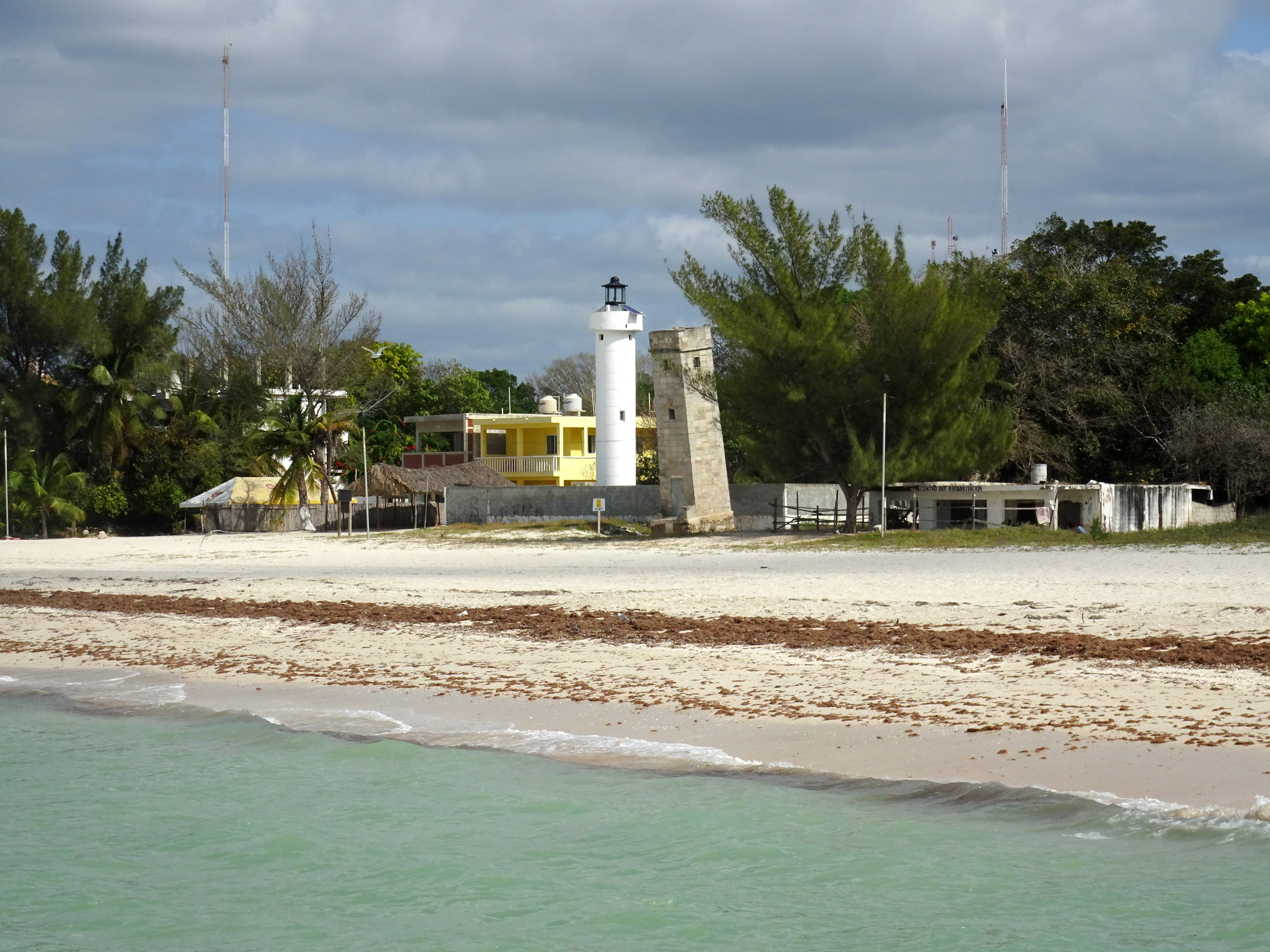
The lighthouse in Celestún beach

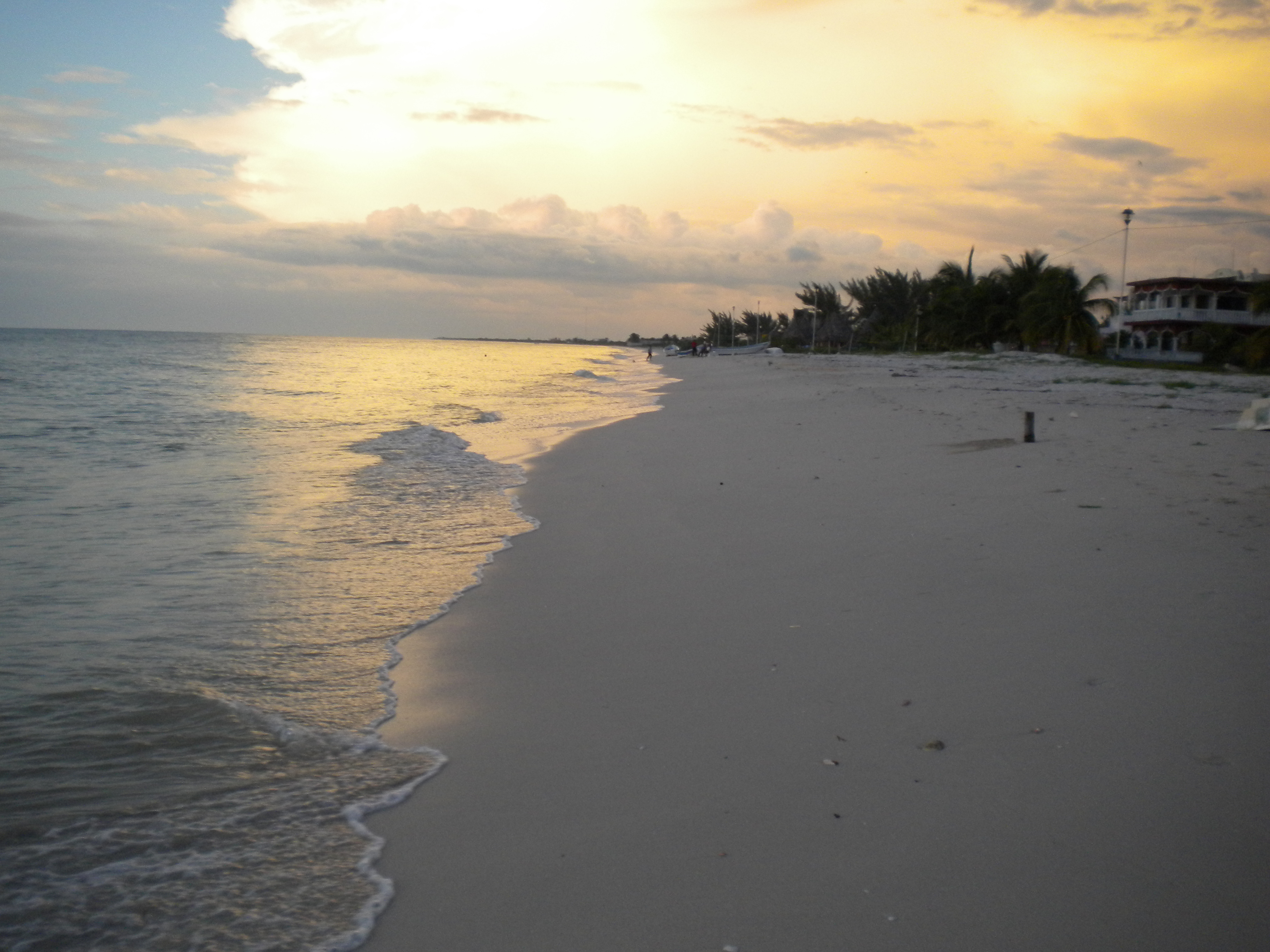
A beach by Celestún

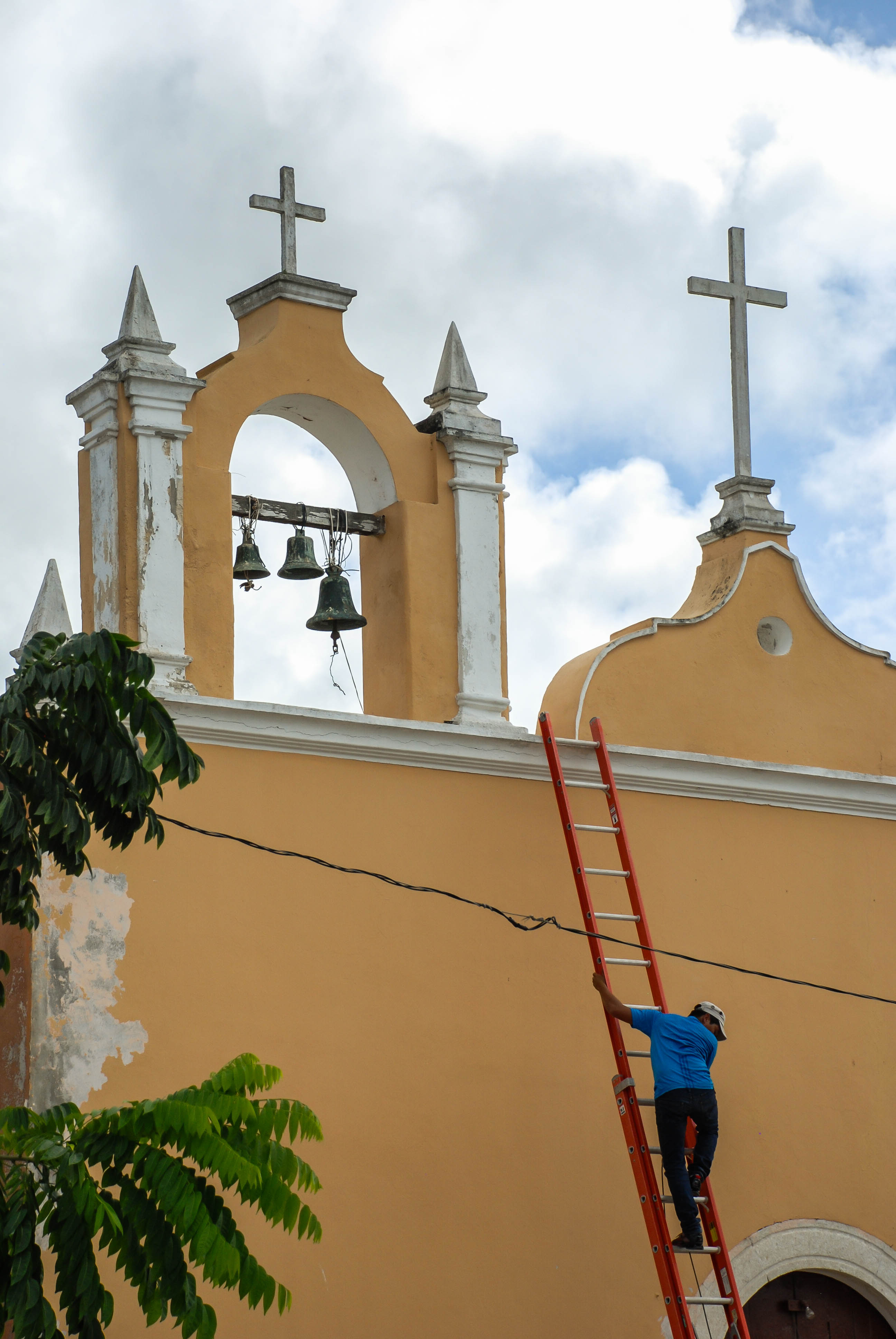
The church in Celestún

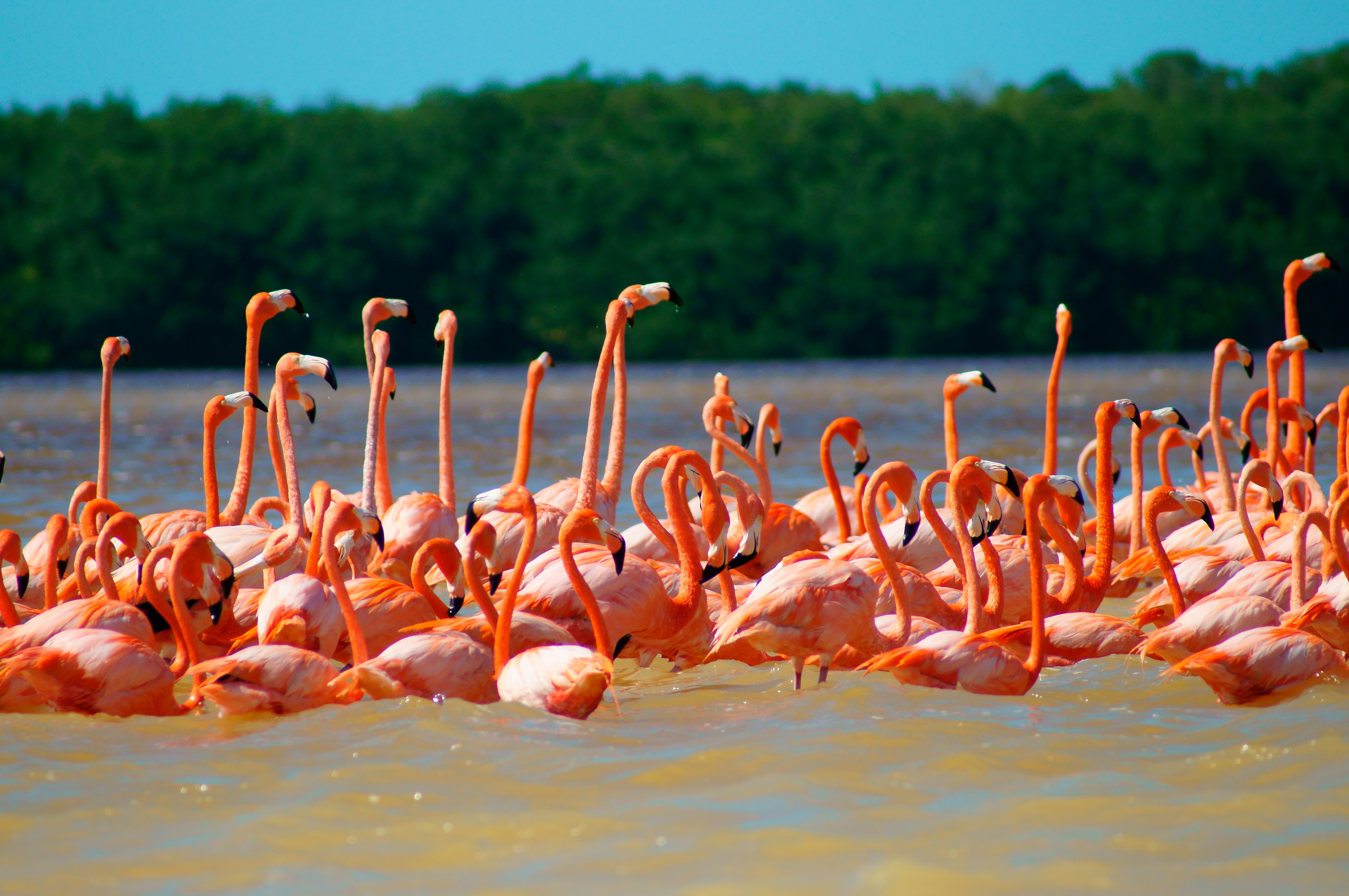
Flamingos

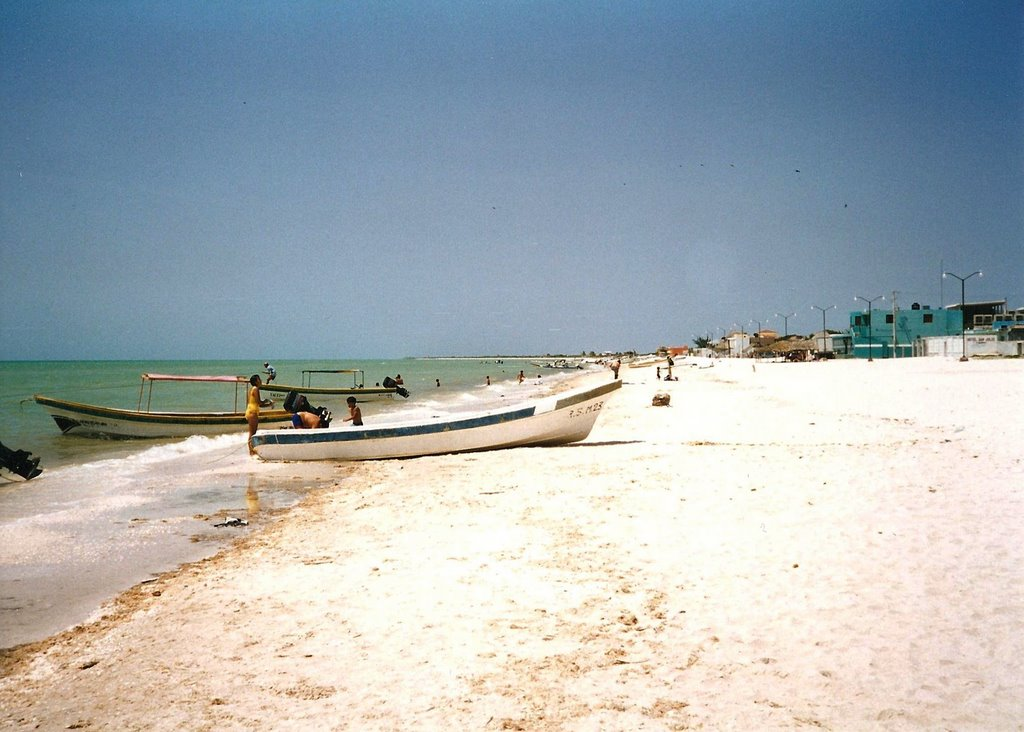
A beach by Celestún, 1999

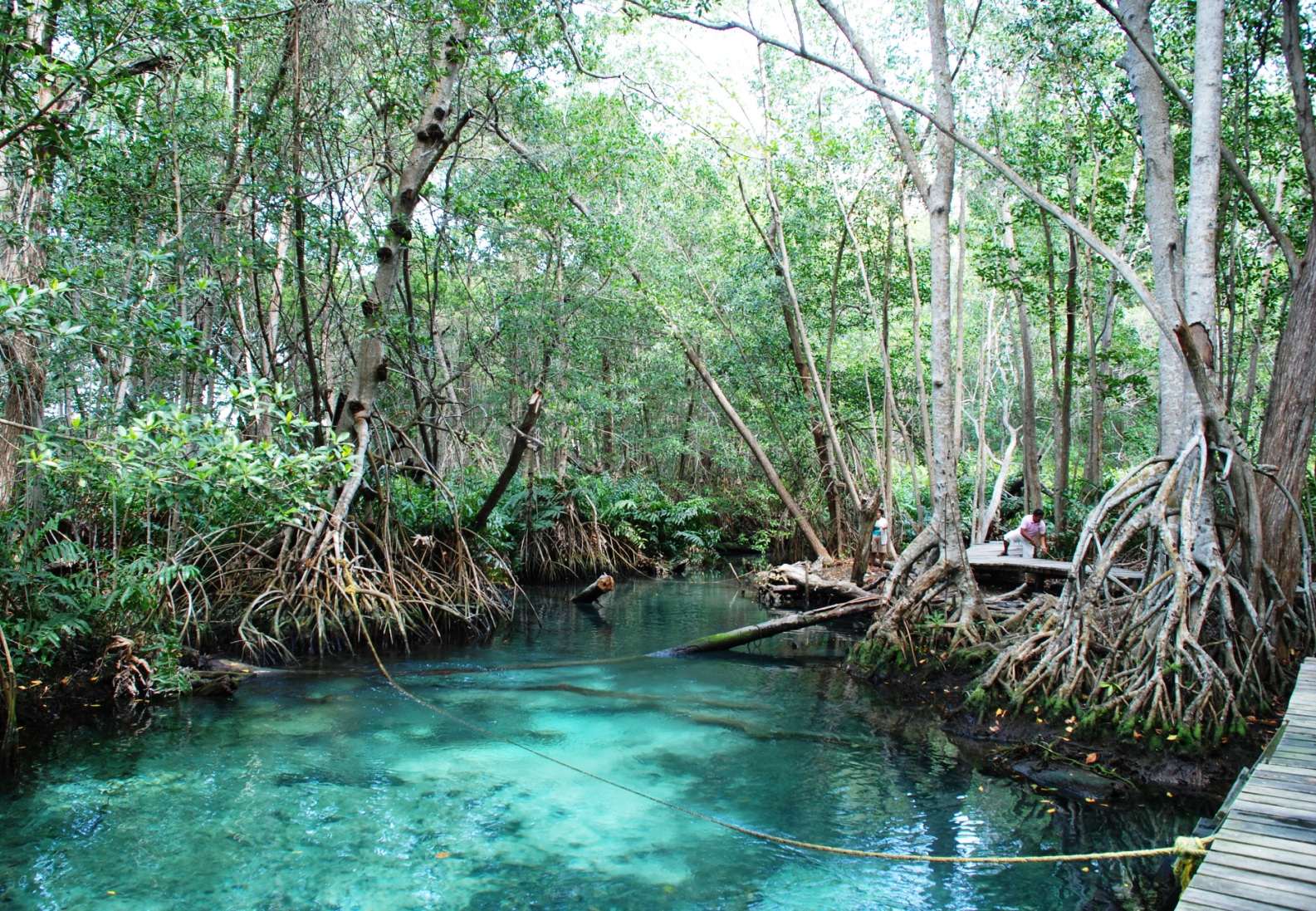
Waters in Celestun
