= Yucatán dry forests =

Tropical dry broadleaf forest ecoregion in Mexico

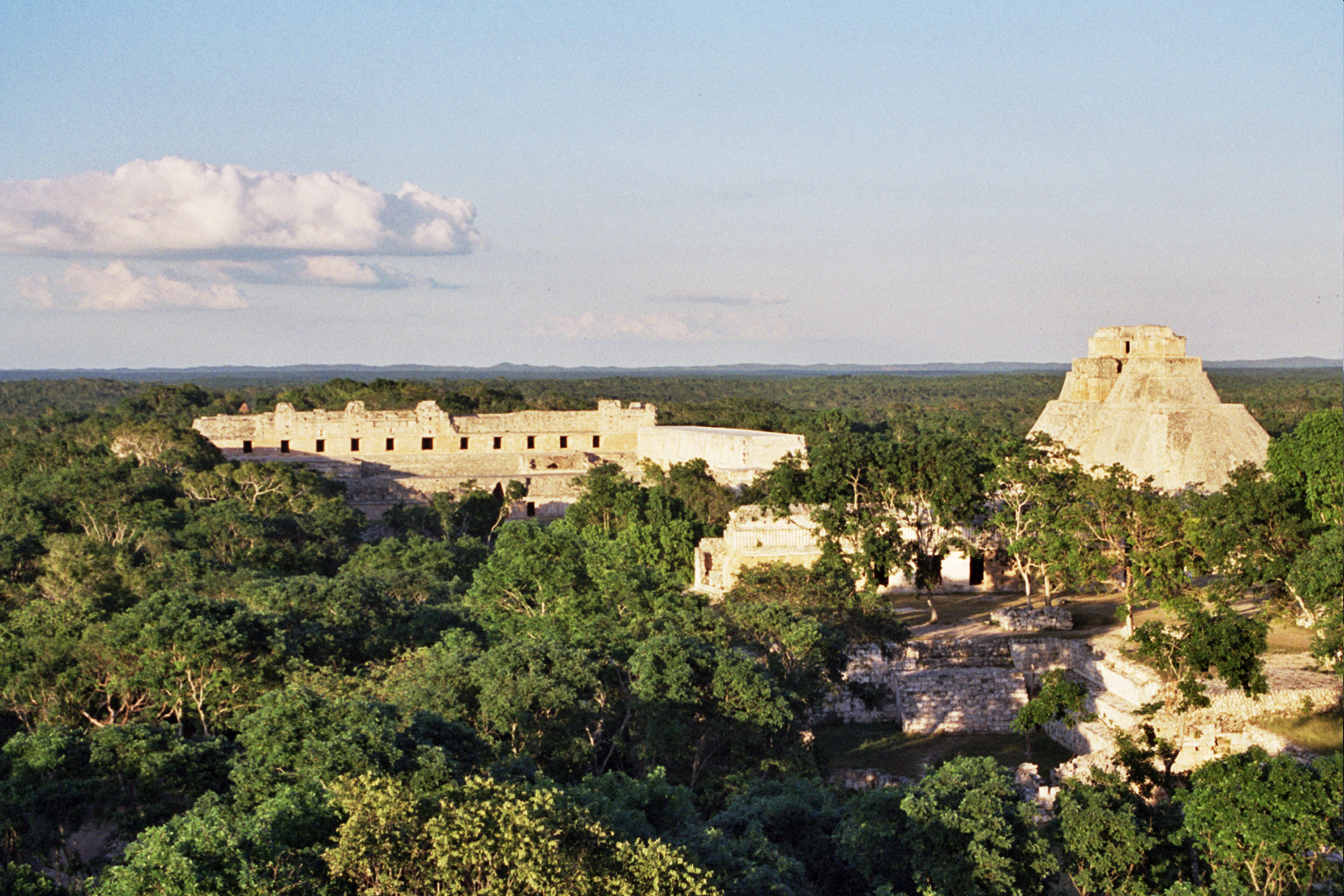
- Mayan ruins at Uxmal, Yucatan

- Location of the Yucatán dry forests ecoregion

Ecology
- Realm: Neotropical
- Biome: tropical and subtropical dry broadleaf forests
- Borders: Yucatán moist forests; Petenes mangroves; Ría Lagartos mangroves

Geography
- Area: 49,583 km^{2} (19,144 sq mi)
- Country: Mexico
- States: Campeche; Yucatán

Conservation
- Conservation status: Relatively stable/intact
- Protected: 1,723 km^{2} (3%)

The Yucatán dry forests is a tropical dry broadleaf forest ecoregion in southern Mexico. It includes the dry forests of the northwestern Yucatán Peninsula.

== Geography ==
The Yucatán dry forests occupy the northwestern portion of the Yucatán Peninsula. They cover most of the state of Yucatán, the northern portion of Campeche, and small areas of northwestern Quintana Roo. It is bounded on the east and south by the Yucatán moist forests ecoregion. The Gulf of Mexico lies to the north and west, and the coast is fringed with mangroves.

The region is mostly flat, lying below 400 meters elevation. The underlying rocks are porous limestone and coral, and the region has extensive underground drainage, including caverns and sinkholes, with few surface streams or rivers.

The cities of Mérida and Campeche are located in the ecoregion.

== Climate ==
The climate of the ecoregion is tropical and subhumid. Rainfall is less than 1200 mm per year, with a long dry season.

== Flora ==
The predominant vegetation is open-canopied dry forest and thorn scrub. Most trees and shrubs are deciduous, losing their leaves during the long dry season. Cacti are common, particularly nearer the coast. Grassy and herbaceous understory plants are generally sparse.

In the drier central portion of the ecoregion, tsalam (Lysiloma bahamensis) and jabín (Piscidia piscipula) are the predominant trees, with Alvaradoa amorphoides, Bursera simaruba, Cedrela mexicana, Chlorophora tinctoria, Cordia gerascanthus, and Lonchocarpus rugosus. Elsewhere Vitex gaumeri, Brosimum alicastrum, Caesalpinia gaumeri, Cedrela odorata, Ceiba pentandra, and Sideroxylon foetidissimum are common.

Along the northern coast tall columnar cacti are abundant. Common species include Cephalocereus gaumeri, Pterocereus gaumeri, and Lemaireocereus griseus.

About 10% of plants are endemic to the ecoregion. The tropical moist forests to the south isolate the Yucatán dry forests from other dry forest ecoregions in Mexico and Central America.

== Fauna ==
Approximately 96 mammal species are native to the ecoregion. These include the jaguar (Panthera onca), white-nosed coati (Nasua narica), black-handed spider monkey (Ateles geoffroyi), and southern opossum (Didelphis marsupialis).

Over 290 bird species inhabit the ecoregion, with two endemic species. Resident birds include white-fronted amazon (Amazona albifrons) and lesser yellow-headed vulture (Cathartes burrovianus).

Native reptiles include the Mexican beaded lizard (Heloderma horridum).

== Conservation and protected areas ==
Extensive areas of dry forest have been cleared for cattle ranching and for agriculture, including henequén plantations. A 2017 assessment found that only 278 km^{2}, or 3%, of the ecoregion is in protected areas. Protected areas include Ría Lagartos Biosphere Reserve, Los Petenes Biosphere Reserve, Anillo de Cenotes State Reserve, Dzilam State Reserve, and Puuc Biocultural State Reserve.

== See also ==
- List of ecoregions in Mexico
