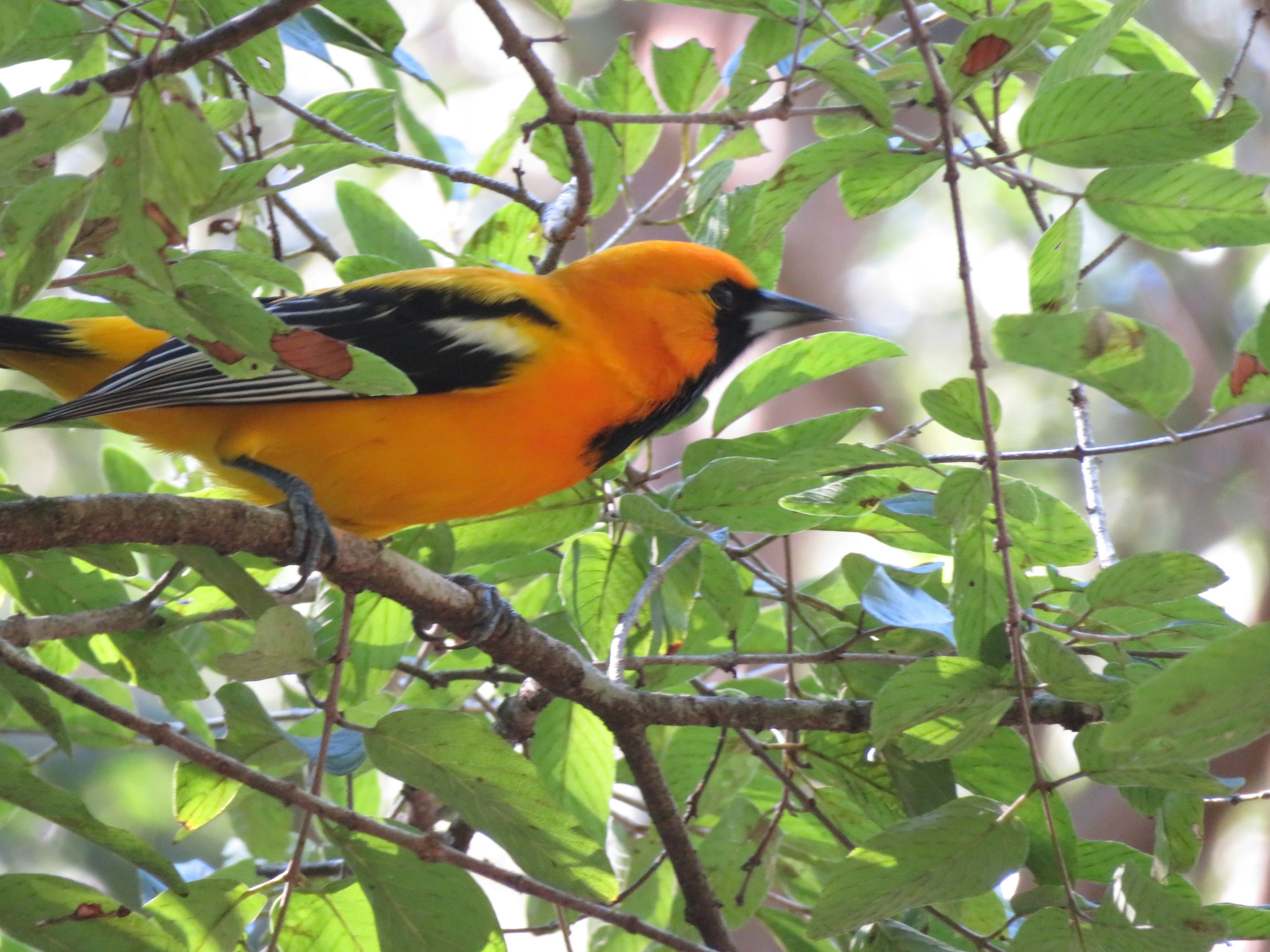

Conservation status
- Least Concern (IUCN 3.1)

Scientific classification
- Kingdom: Animalia
- Phylum: Chordata
- Class: Aves
- Order: Passeriformes
- Family: Icteridae
- Genus: Icterus
- Species: I. auratus

Binomial name
- Icterus auratus Bonaparte, 1850

= Orange oriole =

Species of bird

The orange oriole (Icterus auratus) is a small bird species with orange feathers native to the Icteridae family in the Yucatán Peninsula. It has a slender body, long wings, and a pointed beak. Its color resembles the fruit orange, and it has black markings on its wings and tail. The orange oriole is known for its song and can be found in forests and gardens. They have a diverse diet that contributes to their color. According to The Cornell Lab of Ornithology Birds of the World, they have suggested that this species might be better named the "Yucatan Oriole" because they are only found in Southeast Mexico. This species is not endangered and least threatened.

== Field identification ==
Its size ranges from about 19–21 cm (7.5–8.3 in). This bird also has no subspecies. They are more on the orange and black side of coloring. Males have black region between their eyes and bill and a medium stripe across its upper breasts area. The orange oriole's head and body are both orange. The lesser layer of feathers are orange, while the medium and greater layers are white. On the other hand, females are "duller over the head and underparts" and their mantles are green. Females are duller than males and have an orange-yellow wash.

== Sound and vocal behavior ==
The orange oriole's sound is made up of increasing and decreasing whistles. It often sounds like a fast "chuchu chuchu" or "nyeek".

== Diet ==
The orange oriole's diet consists of various insects, fruits, and nectar. It feeds on the native tree, Talisia olivaeformis, as well as the medicinal tree, Metopium brownie. To gather the fruit from the native tree, the orange oriole uses its bill to pry into the hard shell and withdraw the pulp from inside the fruit. They feed on the native tree, but also feed on fruits from the medicinal tree. They forage both in pairs, but also individually; if they go in pairs, it is with other orioles. The orange coloring of their feathers is due to the colored pigments of their diet.

== Habitat ==
Orange orioles are found in the lowlands of Mexico and are resident to the country; they do not migrate. They reside in the forest, woodlands, as well as abandoned farmland. Their habitat also has an effect on their plumage variation of color because of the differences in diets seen throughout the habitats.

== Conservation status ==
This species is not perceived as globally threatened or endangered. Their population is decreasing, but not at a concerning rate. The global population observed by Partners in Flight is estimated to be 50,000. They range between common to fairly common.

== Breeding ==
The breeding season for orange orioles is July. They breed in colonies ranging from 20 to 35 nests, utilizing up to five nests in one tree. Their nests are made from black and yellow fibers and are attached to branches. The nests are 7.5 centimeters in diameter and are 12.5 centimeters deep. They are located above ground in trees, or near natural water-holes.
