= Yucatán Peninsula =

Peninsula in North America

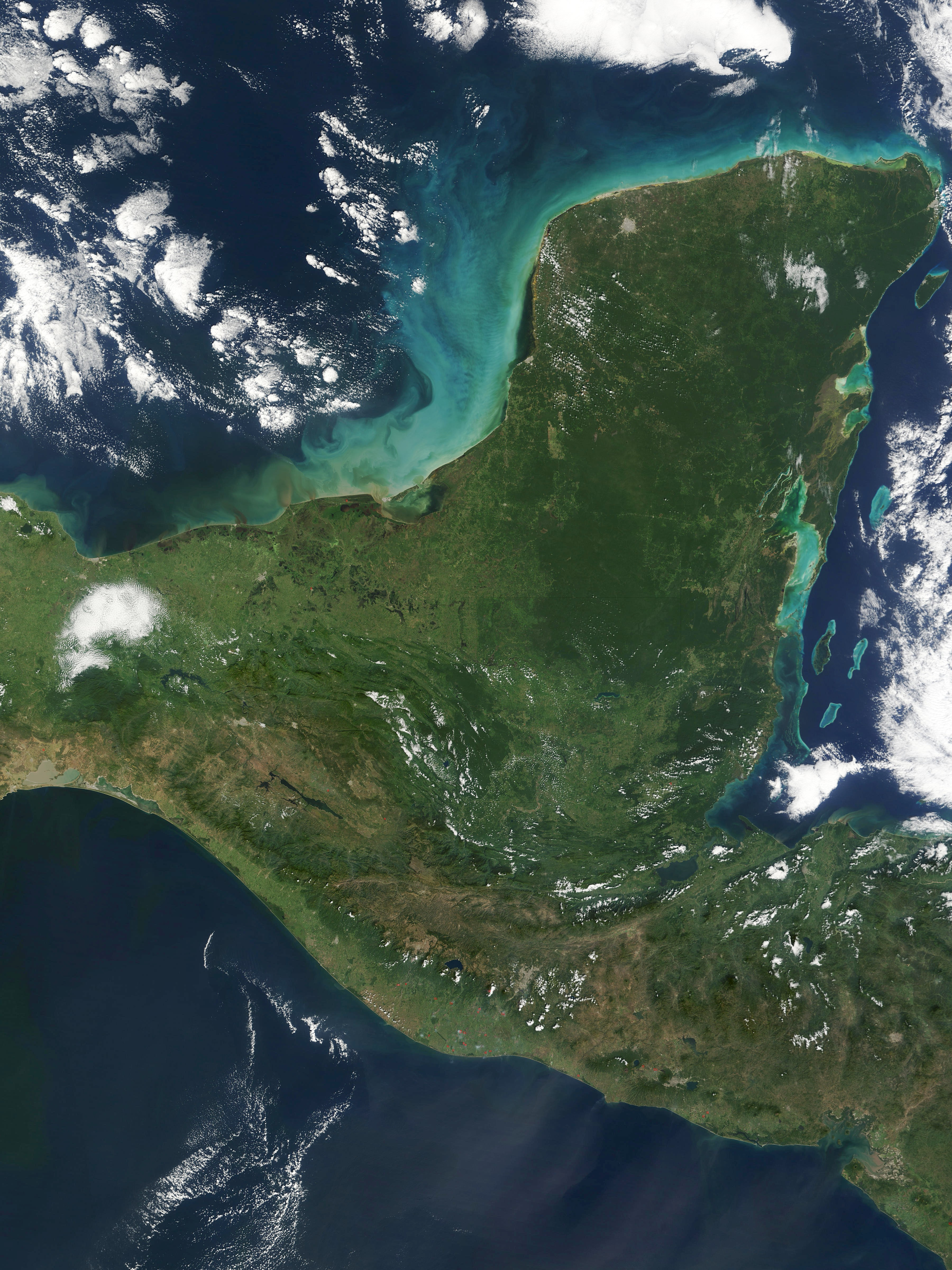
- Satellite image of the Yucatán Peninsula

- Approximate range of the Yucatán Peninsula

Geography
- Location: North America
- Coordinates: 19°33′04″N 89°17′47″W
- Adjacent to: Bay of Campeche (West); Caribbean Sea (East); Gulf of Honduras (Southeast); Gulf of Mexico (North); Yucatán Channel (Northeast)

Administration
- Mexico Belize Guatemala

The Yucatán Peninsula (/ˌjuːkəˈtɑːn, -ˈtæn/ YOO-kə-TA(H)N, UK also /ˌjʊk-/ YUU-; Spanish: Península de Yucatán [peˈninsula ðe ʝukaˈtan]) is a large peninsula in southeast Mexico and adjacent portions of Belize and Guatemala. The peninsula extends towards the northeast, separating the Gulf of Mexico to the north and west of the peninsula from the Caribbean Sea to the east. The Yucatán Channel, between the northeastern corner of the peninsula and Cuba, connects the two bodies of water.

The peninsula is approximately 181,000 km^{2} (70,000 mi^{2}) in area. It has low relief and is almost entirely composed of porous limestone.

The peninsula lies east of the Isthmus of Tehuantepec, the narrowest point in Mexico separating the Atlantic Ocean, including the Gulf of Mexico and Caribbean Sea, from the Pacific Ocean. It sits on the Maya Block—the southernmost part of the North American plate. Some consider the isthmus to be the geographic boundary between Central America and the rest of North America, placing the peninsula in Central America. Politically, all of Mexico, including the Yucatán, is generally considered part of North America, while Guatemala and Belize are considered part of Central America.

== Etymology ==
The proper derivation of the word Yucatán is widely debated. 17th-century Franciscan historian Diego López de Cogolludo offers two theories in particular. In the first one, Francisco Hernández de Córdoba, having first arrived to the peninsula in 1517, inquired the name of a certain settlement and the response in Yucatec Mayan was "I don't understand", which sounded like yucatán to the Spaniards. (Note: Several interpretations exist regarding this.) There are many possibilities of what the natives could have actually said, among which "mathan cauyi athán", "tectecán", "ma'anaatik ka t'ann" and "ci u t'ann". This origin story was first told by Hernán Cortés in his letters to Charles V. Later 16th century historians Motolinia and Francisco López de Gómara also repeat this version. In some versions the expedition is not the one captained by Córdoba but instead the one a year later captained by Juan de Grijalva. The second major theory is that the name is in some way related to the yuca crop, as written by Bernal Díaz del Castillo. Others theories claim that it is a derivative of Chontal Tabascan word yokat'an meaning speaker of the Yoko ochoco language, or an incorrect Nahuatl term yokatlan as supposedly "place of richness" (yohcāuh cannot be paired with tlán).

== History ==
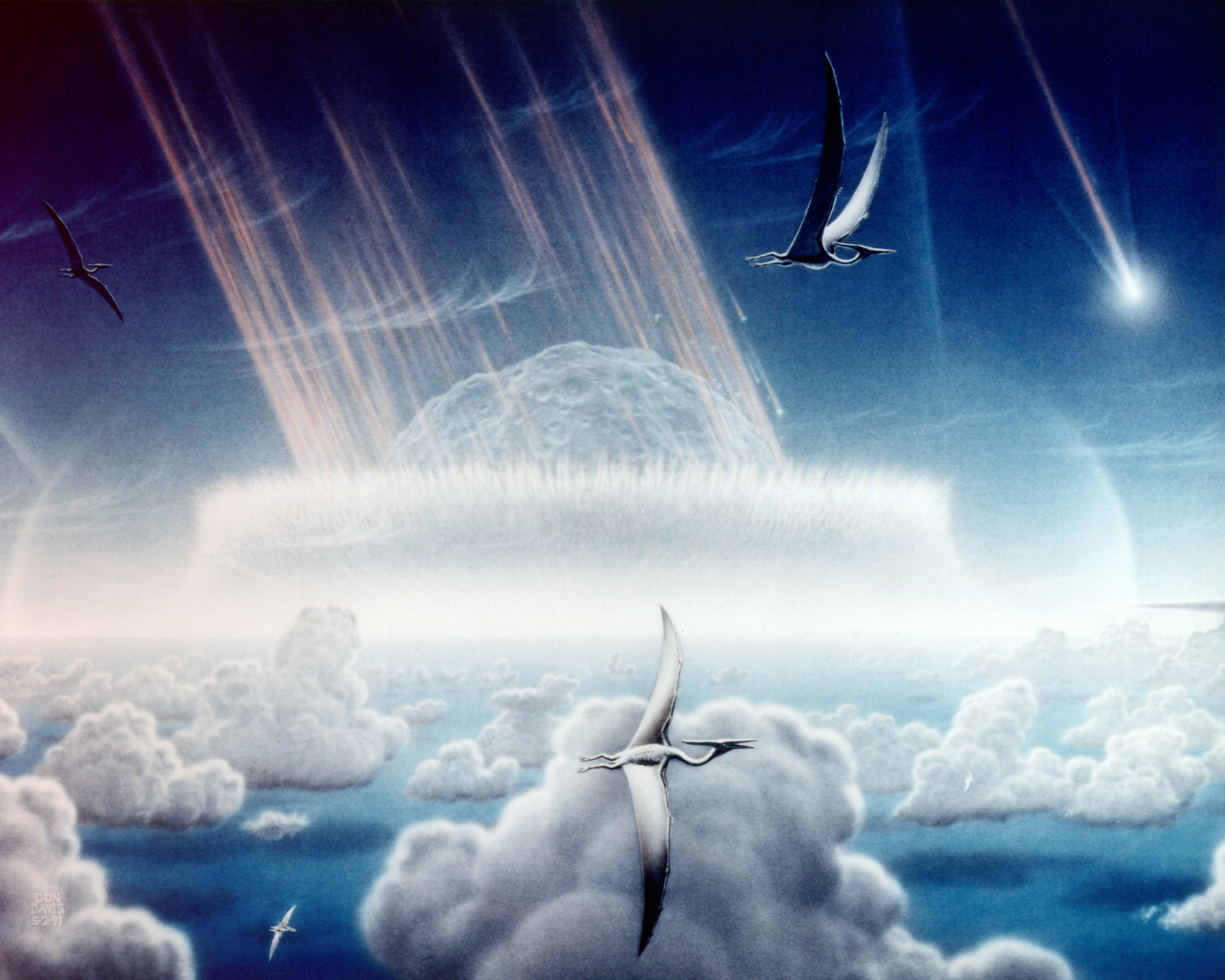
Artistic impression of the asteroid slamming into tropical, shallow seas of the sulfur-rich Yucatán Peninsula in what is today Southeast Mexico. The aftermath of this immense asteroid collision, which occurred approximately 66 million years ago, is believed to have caused the mass extinction of non-avian dinosaurs and many other species on Earth. The impact spewed hundreds of billions of tons of sulfur into the atmosphere, producing a worldwide blackout and freezing temperatures that persisted for at least a decade.

=== Pre-human ===
The Yucatán Peninsula is the site of the Chicxulub crater impact, which was created 66 million years ago by an asteroid of about 10 to 15 kilometers (6 to 9 miles) in diameter at the end of the Cretaceous Period.

=== Prehistory ===
In 2020, an underwater archaeological expedition led by Jerónimo Avilés excavated Chan Hol cave, near the Tulum archaeological site in the state of Quintana Roo on the peninsula, and revealed the skeleton of a woman approximately 30 years of age who lived at least 9,900 years ago. According to craniometric measurements, the skull is believed to conform to the mesocephalic pattern, like the other three skulls found in Tulum caves. Three different scars on the skull of the woman showed that she was hit with something hard and her skull bones were broken. Her skull also had crater-like deformations and tissue deformities that appeared to be caused by a bacterial relative of syphilis.

According to study lead researcher Wolfgang Stinnesbeck, "It really looks as if this woman had a very hard time and an extremely unhappy end of her life. Obviously, this is speculative, but given the traumas and the pathological deformations on her skull, it appears a likely scenario that she may have been expelled from her group and was killed in the cave, or was left in the cave to die there".

The newly discovered skeleton was 140 meters away from the Chan Hol 2 site. Although archaeologists assumed the divers had found the remains of the missing Chan Hol 2, the analysis soon proved that these assumptions were erroneous. Stinnesbeck compared the new bones to old photographs of Chan Hol 2 and showed that the two skeletons represent different individuals.

Due to their distinctive features, study co-researcher Samuel Rennie suggest the existence of at least two morphologically diverse groups of people living separately in Mexico during the transition from Pleistocene to Holocene.

=== Maya ===
El Castillo, at Chichen Itza

The Yucatán Peninsula constitutes a significant proportion of the ancient Maya lowlands and was the central location of the Maya Civilization. The Maya culture also extended south of the Yucatán Peninsula into Guatemala, Honduras, and the highlands of Chiapas. There are many Maya archaeological sites throughout the peninsula; some of the better-known are Chichen Itza, Coba, Tulum, and Uxmal.

In the 9th century, there was a widespread political collapse in the central Maya region, resulting in civil wars, the abandonment of cities, and a northward shift of population. The Postclassic period saw the rise of Chichen Itza in the north.

=== Spanish conquest ===
The Spanish conquest of the Maya was a prolonged affair; the Maya kingdoms resisted integration into the Spanish Empire with such tenacity that their defeat took almost two centuries.

With the Caste War of Yucatán, which started in the 1840s, all non-natives were driven from the region. The independent Mayan state of Chan Santa Cruz was conquered by the Mexican federal army in 1901.

Indigenous Maya and Mestizos of partial Maya descent make up a sizable portion of the region's population, and Mayan languages are widely spoken there.

== Geology ==
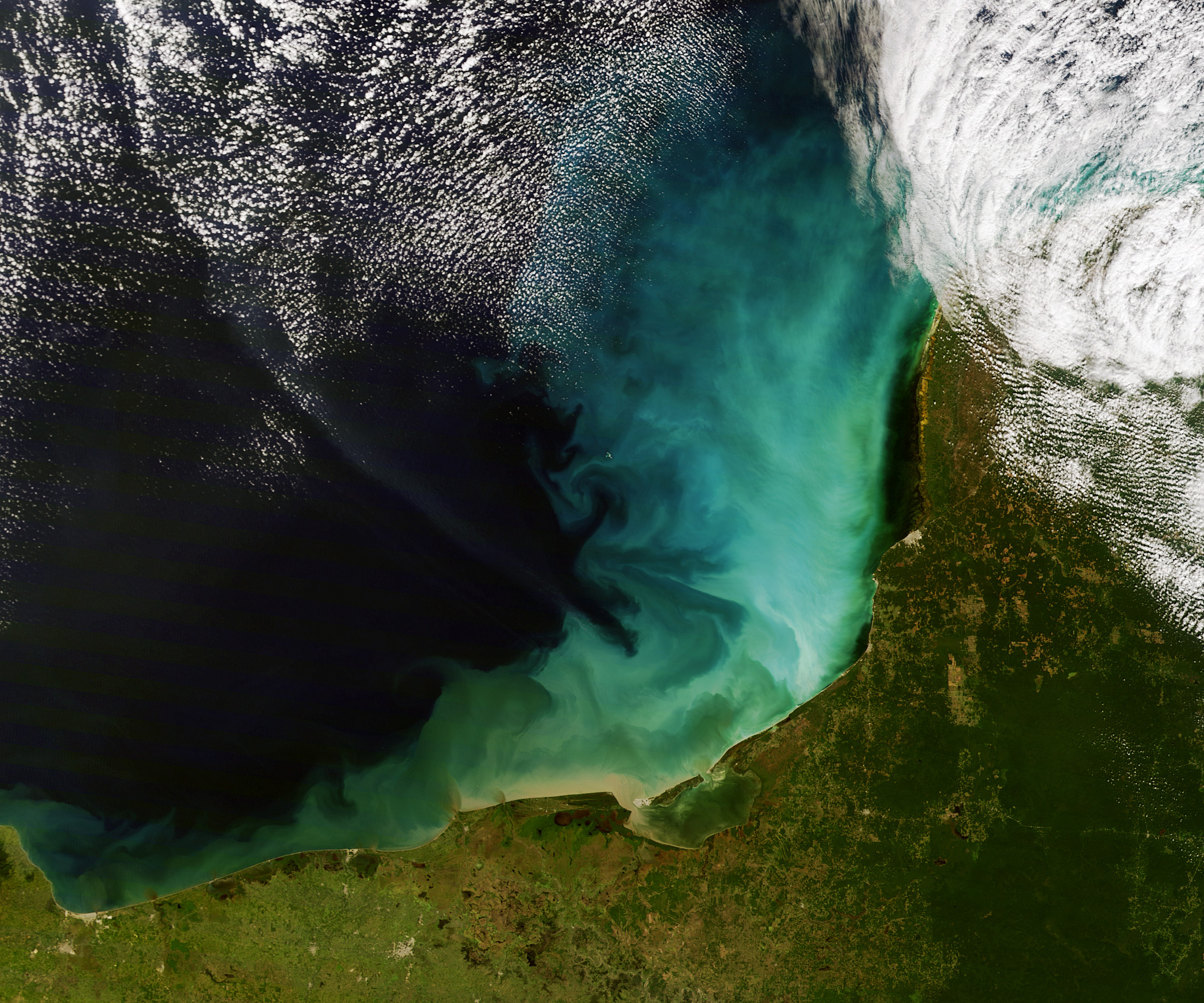
Sediment off the Yucatán Peninsula

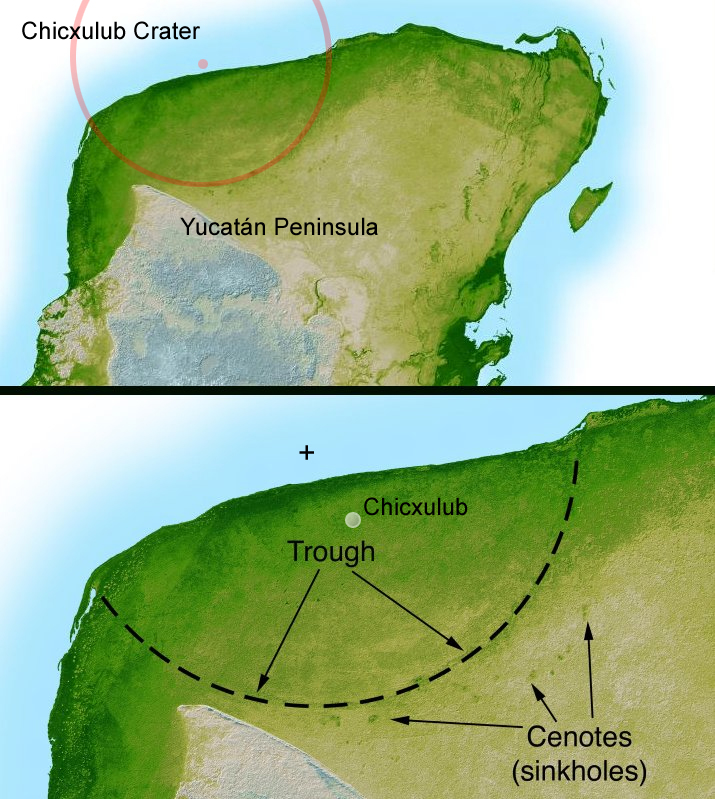
Location of the "Ring of Cenotes" on the Yucatán Peninsula

The peninsula is the exposed portion of the larger Yucatán Platform, all of which is composed of carbonate and soluble rocks, being mostly limestone although dolomite and evaporites are also present at various depths. The whole of the Yucatán Peninsula is an unconfined flat lying karst landscape. Sinkholes, known locally as cenotes, are widespread in the northern lowlands.

According to the Alvarez hypothesis, the mass extinction of the non-avian dinosaurs at the transition from the Cretaceous to the Paleogene Period, the Cretaceous–Paleogene boundary (K–Pg boundary), 66 million years ago was caused by an asteroid impact somewhere in the greater Caribbean Basin. The deeply buried Chicxulub crater is centered off the north coast of the peninsula near the town of Chicxulub. The now-famous "Ring of Cenotes," a geologic structure composed of sinkholes arranged in a semi-circle, outlines one of the shock-waves from this impact event in the approximately 66-million-year-old rock. The existence of the crater has been supported by evidence including the aforementioned "Ring of Cenotes", as well as the presence of impact debris such as shocked quartz and tektites, a type of glass formed during meteorite impacts.

The Arrowsmith Bank is a submerged bank located off the northeastern end of the peninsula.

== Climate ==
The peninsula has a tropical climate, which ranges from semi-arid in the northwest to humid in the south. Average annual rainfall ranges from less than 800 mm (30 inches) in the driest parts of the northwest up to 2,000 mm (80 inches) in the Petén Basin to the south. Rainfall varies seasonally, with August and September generally the wettest months.

Like much of the Caribbean, the peninsula lies within the Atlantic Hurricane Belt, and with its almost uniformly flat terrain it is vulnerable to these large storms coming from the east, and the area has been devastated by many hurricanes, such as Hurricane Gilbert, Hurricane Emily, Hurricane Wilma, and Hurricane Dean.

Strong storms, northers (or nortes) generated by northerly winds can quickly descend on the Yucatán Peninsula from late autumn to spring. Although these storms pummel the area with heavy rains and high winds, they tend to be short-lived, clearing after about an hour. The average percentage of days with rain per month ranges from a monthly low of 7% in April to a high of up to 50% in October. Breezes can have a cooling effect; humidity is generally high, particularly in the remaining rainforest areas.

== Water resources ==
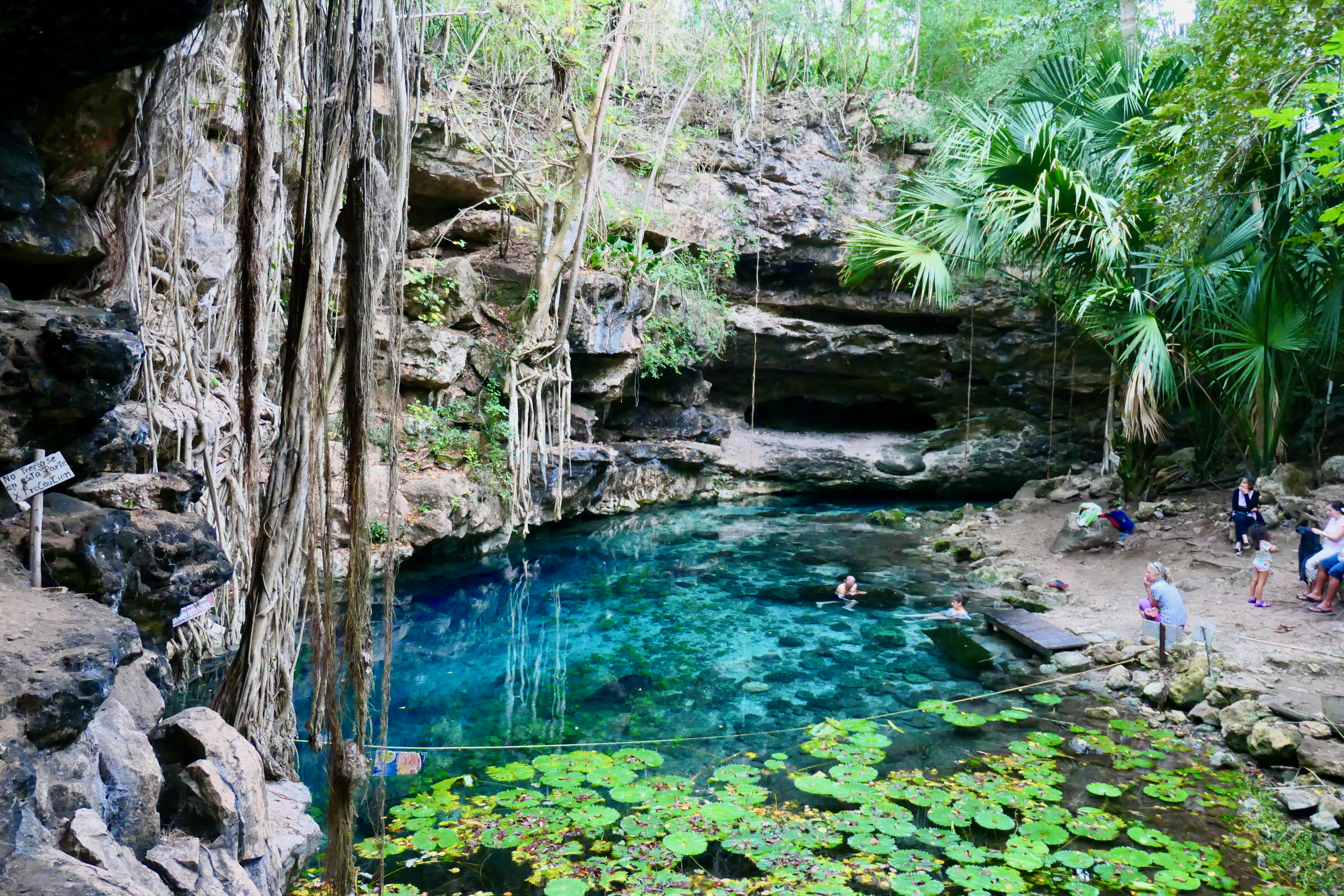
Yucatan's cenote

Due to the extreme karst nature of the whole peninsula, the northern half is devoid of aboveground rivers. Where lakes and swamps are present, the water is marshy and generally unpotable. Due to its coastal location, the whole of the peninsula is underlain by an extensive contiguous density stratified coastal aquifer, where a fresh water lens formed from meteoric water floats on top of intruding saline water from the coastal margins. The thousands of sinkholes known as cenotes throughout the region provide access to the groundwater system. The cenotes have long been relied on by ancient and contemporary Maya people.

== Ecology ==
The vegetation and plant communities of the peninsula vary from north to south. The Yucatán dry forests occupy the dry northwestern peninsula, and include dry forests and scrublands and cactus scrub. The Yucatán moist forests occur across the middle and east of the peninsula, and are characterized by semi-deciduous forests where 25 to 50% of the trees lose their leaves during the summer dry season. The Belizean pine forests are found in several enclaves across central Belize. The southernmost portion of the peninsula is in the Petén–Veracruz moist forests ecoregion, an evergreen rain forest.

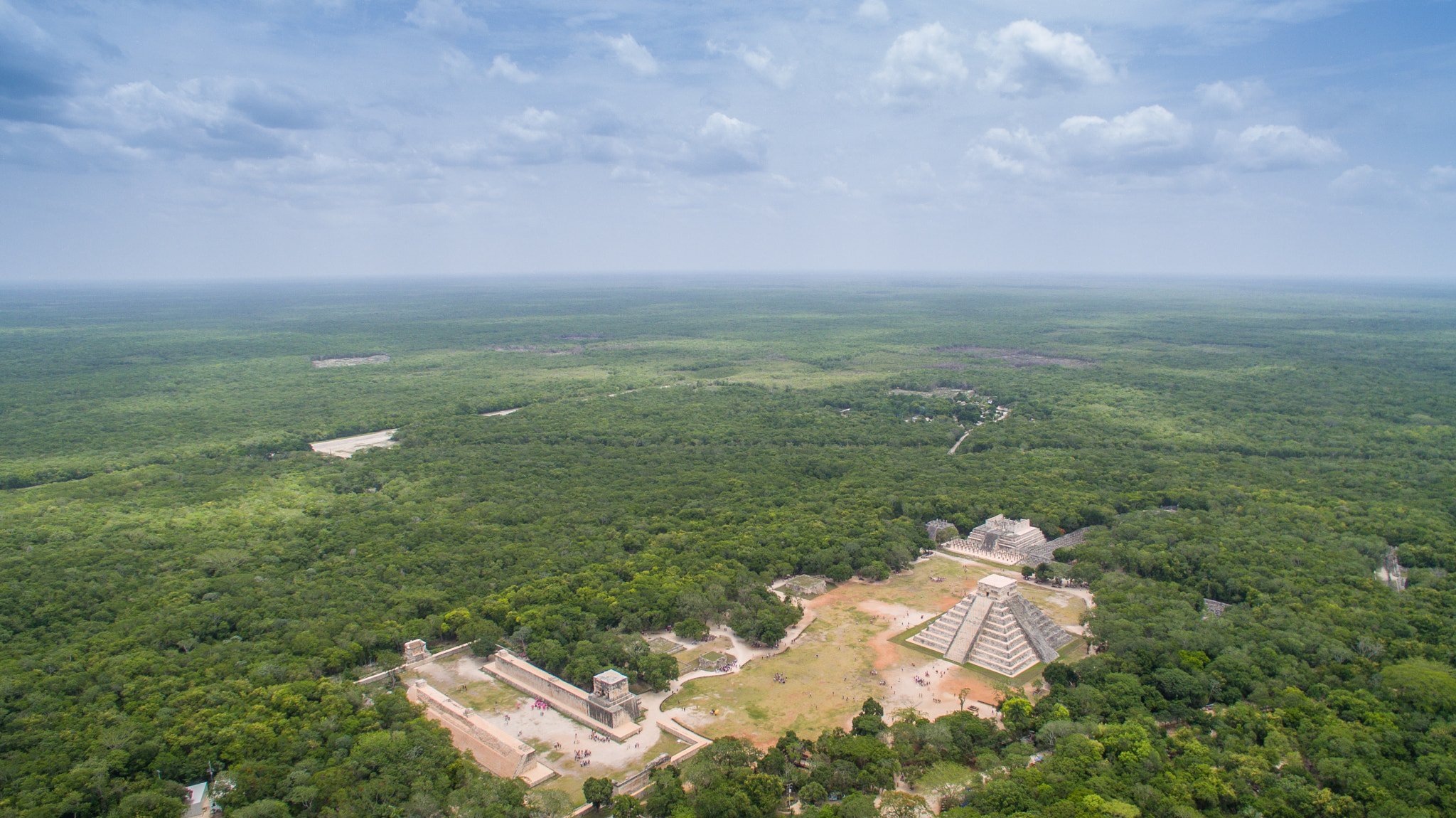
Aerial view of Yucatan

Northern Guatemala (El Petén), Mexico (Campeche and Quintana Roo), and western Belize are still occupied by the largest continuous tracts of tropical rainforest in Central America. However, these forests are suffering extensive deforestation.

Mangroves occur along the coast, with the Usumacinta mangroves around the Laguna de Términos in the southwest, the Petenes mangroves along the west coast, Ría Lagartos mangroves along the northern shore of the peninsula, and the Mayan Corridor mangroves and Belizean Coast mangroves to the east along the Caribbean Sea.

The Mesoamerican Barrier Reef System is an immense coral barrier reef which stretches over 1,100 km (700 miles) along the eastern coast of the peninsula.

== Governance ==
The peninsula comprises the Mexican states of Yucatán, Campeche, and Quintana Roo, as well as Guatemala's Petén Department and almost all of Belize.

== Economy ==
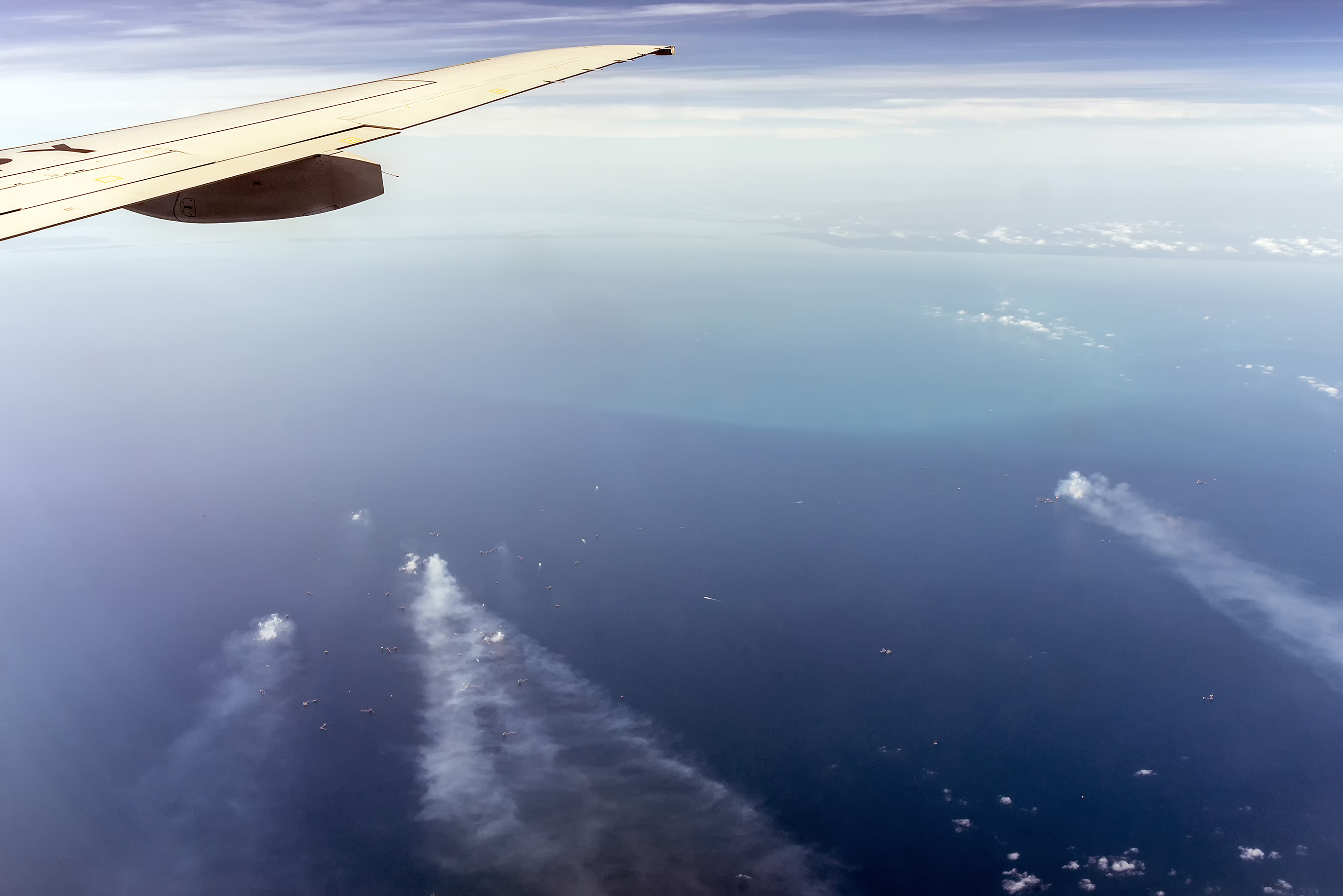
Cantarell Field

In the late historic and early modern eras, the Yucatán Peninsula was largely a cattle ranching, logging, chicle and henequen production area. Since the 1970s, the Yucatán Peninsula has reoriented its economy towards tourism, especially in the Mexican state of Quintana Roo. Aside from tourism, another source of income that is important in the Peninsula is logging as well as chicle industries specifically in Belize. Oil was also found in certain parts of the Yucatán, bringing in more economic opportunities. Once a small fishing village, Cancún in the northeast of the peninsula has grown into a thriving city. The Riviera Maya, which stretches along the east coast of the peninsula between Cancún and Tulum, houses over 50,000 beds. The best-known locations are the former fishing town of Playa del Carmen, the ecological parks Xcaret and Xel-Há and the Maya ruins of Tulum and Coba.

== Population ==
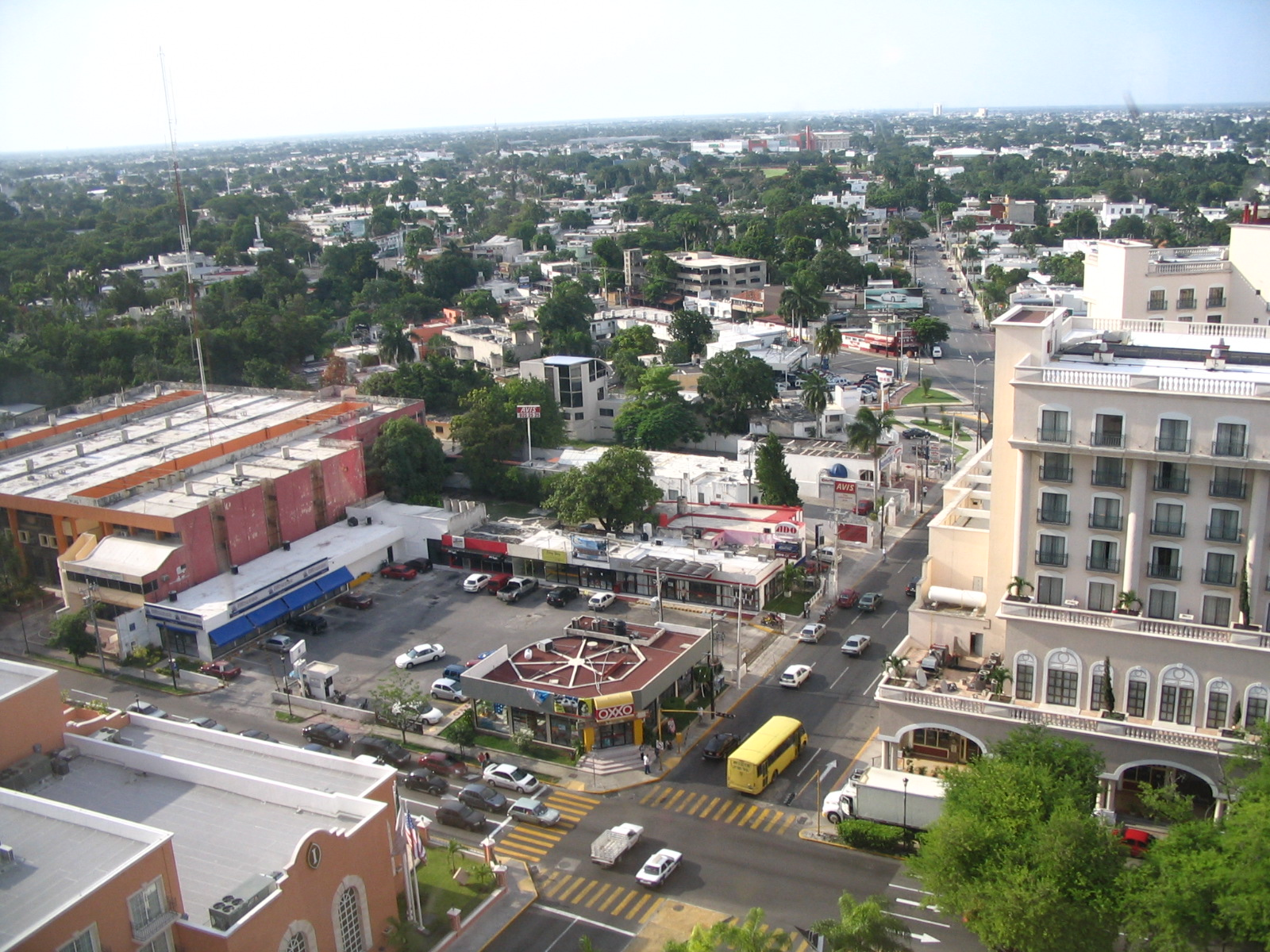
Mérida, Yucatán in 2006

The population of the Yucatán Peninsula is very different throughout each part of the Peninsula. Population density and ethnic composition are two factors that play into the total population. The most populated area is Mérida in Yucatán state and the surrounding region, contrasted by the state of Quintana Roo, the least populated part of the peninsula. In terms of ethnic composition, a majority of the population consisted of both Maya and Mestizos.

== See also ==
- Cenote
- List of peninsulas
