= Central American Atlantic moist forests =

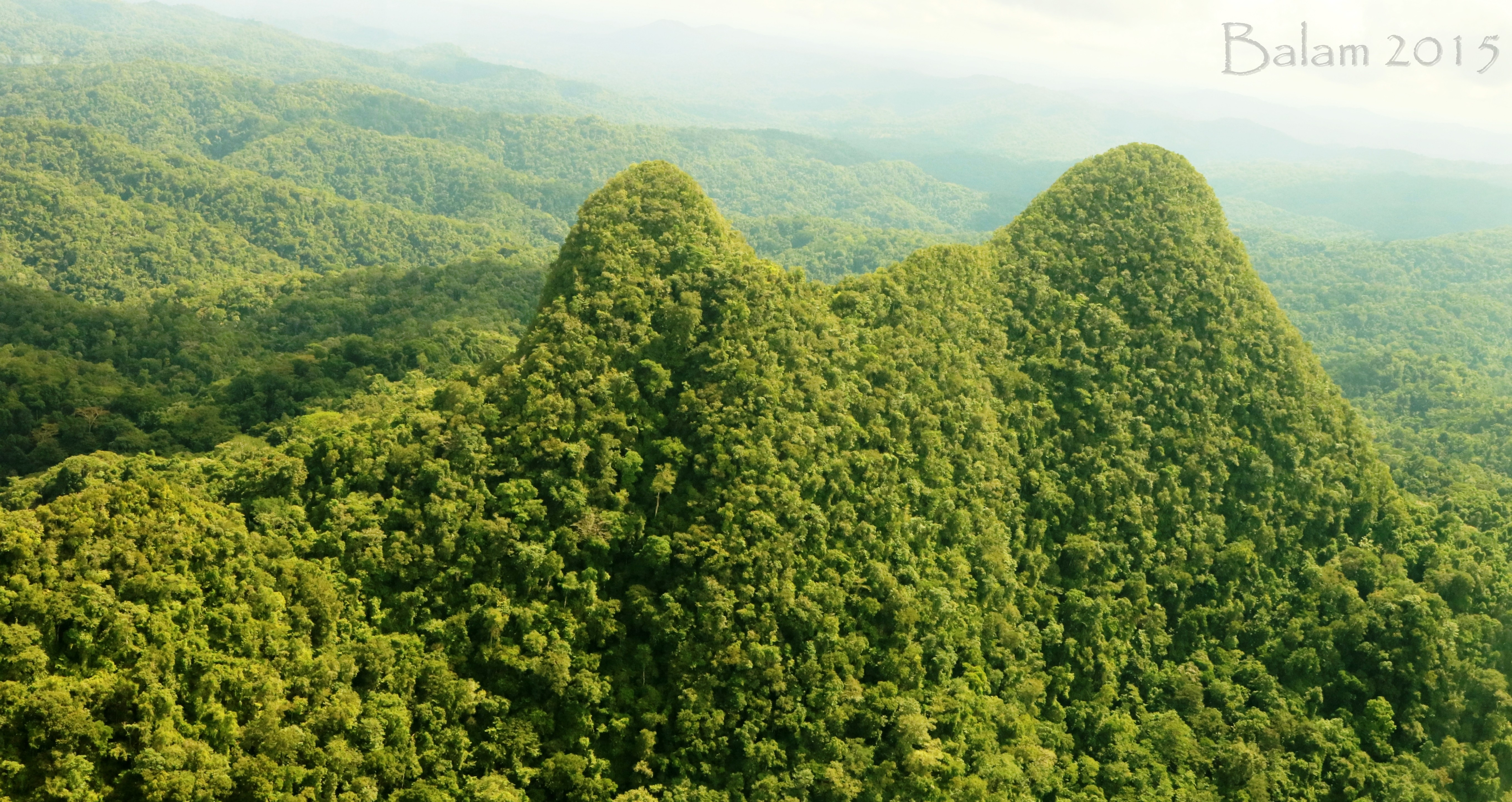
- Cerro Chachahuate

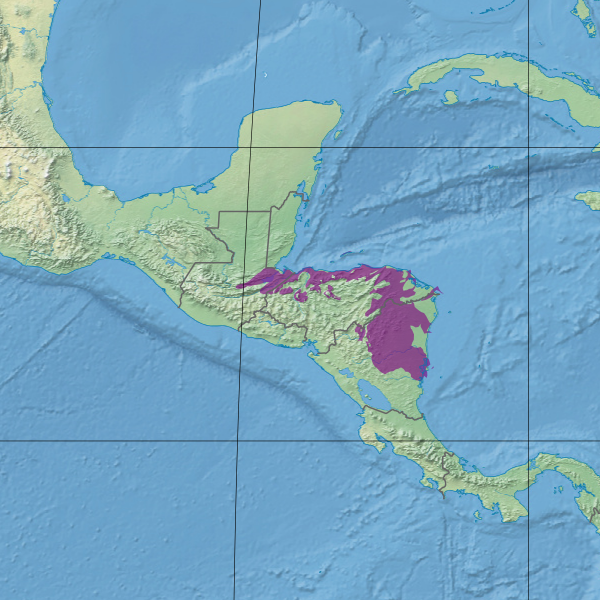
- Ecoregion territory (in purple)

Ecology
- Realm: Neotropical
- Biome: Tropical and subtropical moist broadleaf forests
- Borders: List: Belizean Coast mangroves; Central American dry forests; Central American montane forests; Central American pine–oak forests; Isthmian–Atlantic moist forests; Miskito pine forests; Mosquitia–Nicaraguan Caribbean Coast mangroves; Motagua Valley thornscrub; Northern Honduras mangroves; Petén–Veracruz moist forests

Geography
- Area: 89,979 km^{2} (34,741 sq mi)
- Countries: Guatemala; Honduras; Nicaragua; Belize
- Coordinates: 13.75°N 84.75°W

Conservation
- Protected: 30.2%

The Central American Atlantic moist forests ecoregion (WWF ID: NT0111) covers the lowland coastal forests of Honduras, southeast Guatemala, and the eastern forests of Nicaragua (plus two small patches in Belize). Half of the ecoregion is closed-canopy tropical broadleaf evergreen forest, with tree heights reaching 50 meters. This ecoregion has the largest single fragment of natural forest in Central America, with a size of 14,629 square kilometres (5,648 sq mi). The total area is 89,979 square kilometres (34,741 sq mi).

== Location and description ==
The ecoregion stretches for 700 km from the valley of Lake Izabal in southeastern Guatemala, across the northern coast of Honduras (in a 50 km wide strip), and down across most of the eastern half of Nicaragua (additionally alongside two minuscule patches in Belize). The mean elevation is 293 metres (961 ft), with a maximum of 2,270 metres (7,450 ft).

== Climate ==
The climate of the ecoregion is Tropical monsoon climate (Köppen climate classification (Am)). This climate is characterized by relatively even temperatures throughout the year (all months being greater than 18 °C (64 °F) average temperature), and a pronounced dry season. The driest month has less than 60 mm of precipitation, but more than (100-(average/25) mm. This climate is mid-way between a tropical rainforest and a tropical savanna. Average precipitation in the ecoregion is 2,333 mm/year.

== Flora and fauna ==
Half of the ecoregion is closed-canopy broadleaf evergreen rain forest, but with 30% of the territory converted agriculture. The remainder is open canopy evergreen forest or herbaceous wetland. From 1990 to 2000, the ecoregion was experiencing deforestation at a rate of just under 1% per year. The ecoregion contains a number of large undisturbed fragments, which is important for larger species of animals. (The largest mammals require an estimated 100 km2 fragment to sustain viable populations).

== Protected areas ==
30.2% of the ecoregion is officially protected. These protected areas include:

- Agalta National Park
- Azul Meámbar National Park
- Blanca Jeannette Kawas National Park (Punta Sal)
- Bosawás Biosphere Reserve
- Capiro-Calentura National Park
- Cerro Azul National Park
- Cerro Saslaya National Park
- Chocón Machacas
- Cuevas de Silvino National Park
- Cusuco National Park
- Montaña de Botaderos Carlos Escaleras Mejía National Park
- Montaña de Yoro National Park
- Nombre de Dios National Park
- Omoa National Park
- Patuca National Park
- Pico Bonito National Park
- Pico Píjol National Park
- Punta Izopo National Park
- Port Royal National Park
- Río Dulce National Park
- Río Plátano Biosphere Reserve
- Santa Bárbara National Park
- Tawahka Asagni Biosphere Reserve
- Temash-Sarstoon National Park
