= List of national parks of Honduras =

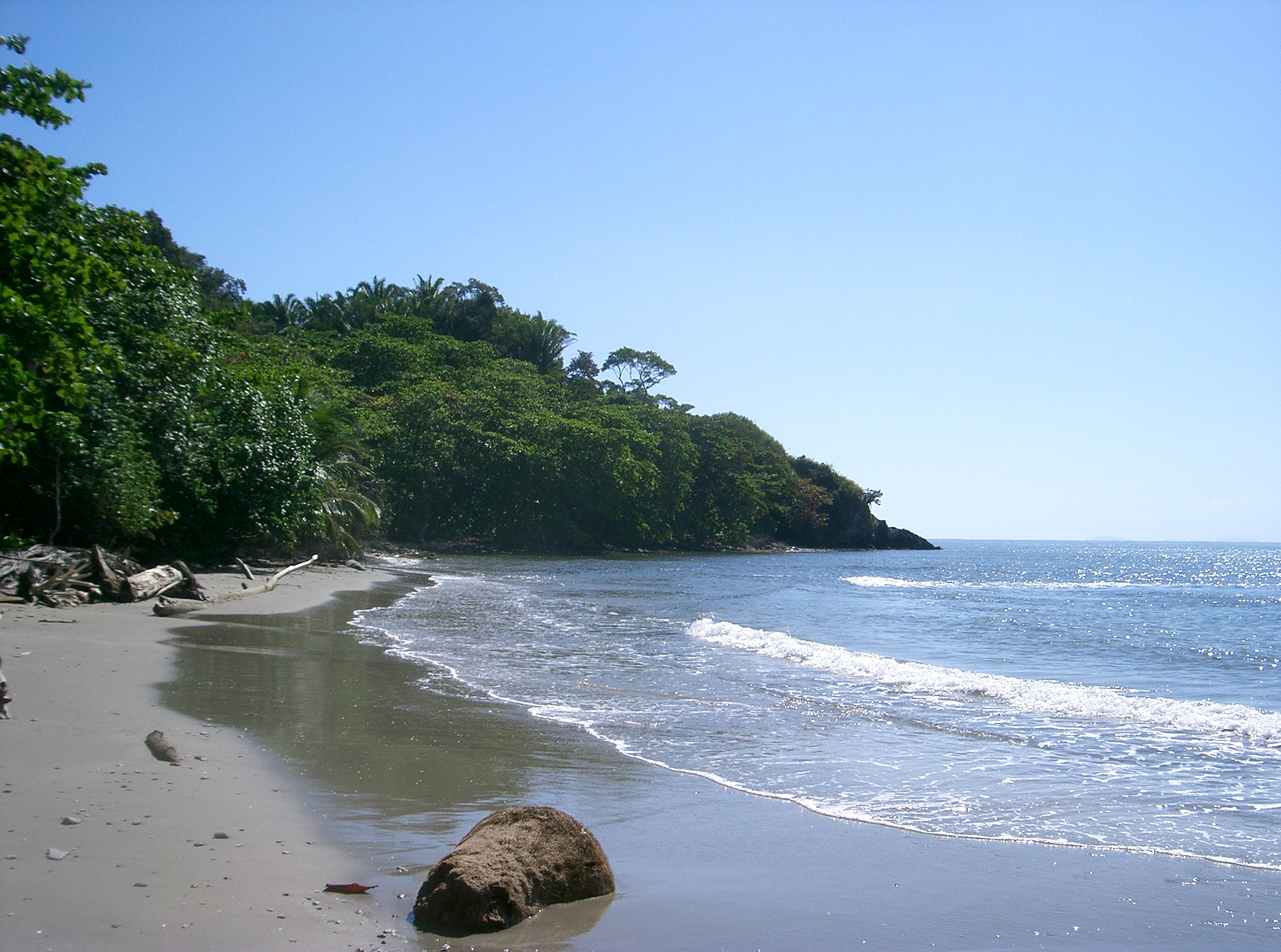
Punta Sal peninsula beach near entrance to the Sendero Los Curumos, Jeannette Kawas National Park

National parks of Honduras is a list of the National parks in Honduras.

== National parks ==
National Park	Area (km^{2})	Department
Capiro Calentura National Park	62	Colón
Celaque National Park	266.4	Lempira
Cerro Azul de Copán National Park	154.6	Copán
Cerro Azul Meámbar National Park	304	Comayagua, Cortés
Congolón, Piedra Parada and Coyocutena National Park	110.46	Lempira
Cusuco National Park	234.4	Cortés, Santa Barbara
Jeannette Kawas National Park	781.6	Atlantida
La Muralla National Park	210.3	Olancho
La Tigra National Park	238.2	Francisco Morazán department (decreto Ley No. 976 del 14 de Julio de 1980)
Montaña de Botaderos Carlos Escaleras Mejía National Park	967.55	Colón, Olancho
Montaña de Comayagua National Park	184.8	Comayagua
Montaña Santa Bárbara National Park	139.42	Santa Barbara
Montaña de Yoro National Park	154.8	Yoro
Montecristo Trifinio National Park	54	Ocotepeque
Nombre de Dios National Park	303.12	Atlántida
Omoa National Park	138.7	Cortés
Patuca National Park	3755.84	Olancho
Pico Bonito National Park	564.3	Atlantida
Pico Pijol National Park	122.1	Yoro
Port Royal National Park	5	Bay Islands
Punta Izopo National Park	112	Atlantida
Rio Kruta National Park	307	Gracias a Dios
Sierra de Agalta National Park	207.8	Olancho
