= List of ecoregions in Honduras =

This is a list of ecoregions in Honduras as defined by the World Wildlife Fund and the Freshwater Ecoregions of the World database.

== Terrestrial ecoregions ==
=== Tropical and subtropical moist broadleaf forests ===
- Central American Atlantic moist forests
- Central American montane forests

=== Tropical and subtropical dry broadleaf forests ===
- Central American dry forests

=== Tropical and subtropical coniferous forests ===
- Central American pine–oak forests
- Miskito pine forests

=== Mangroves ===
- Gulf of Fonseca mangroves
- Mosquitia–Nicaraguan Caribbean Coast mangroves
- Northern Honduras mangroves

== Freshwater ecoregions ==
=== Tropical and subtropical coastal rivers ===
- Chiapas–Fonseca
- Quintana Roo–Motagua
- Mosquitia
- Estero Real–Tempisque

== Marine ecoregions ==
=== Tropical Northwestern Atlantic ===
- Western Caribbean (includes the Mesoamerican Barrier Reef)
- Southwestern Caribbean

=== Tropical East Pacific ===
- Chiapas-Nicaragua
