= Central American montane forests =

Ecoregion in Central America

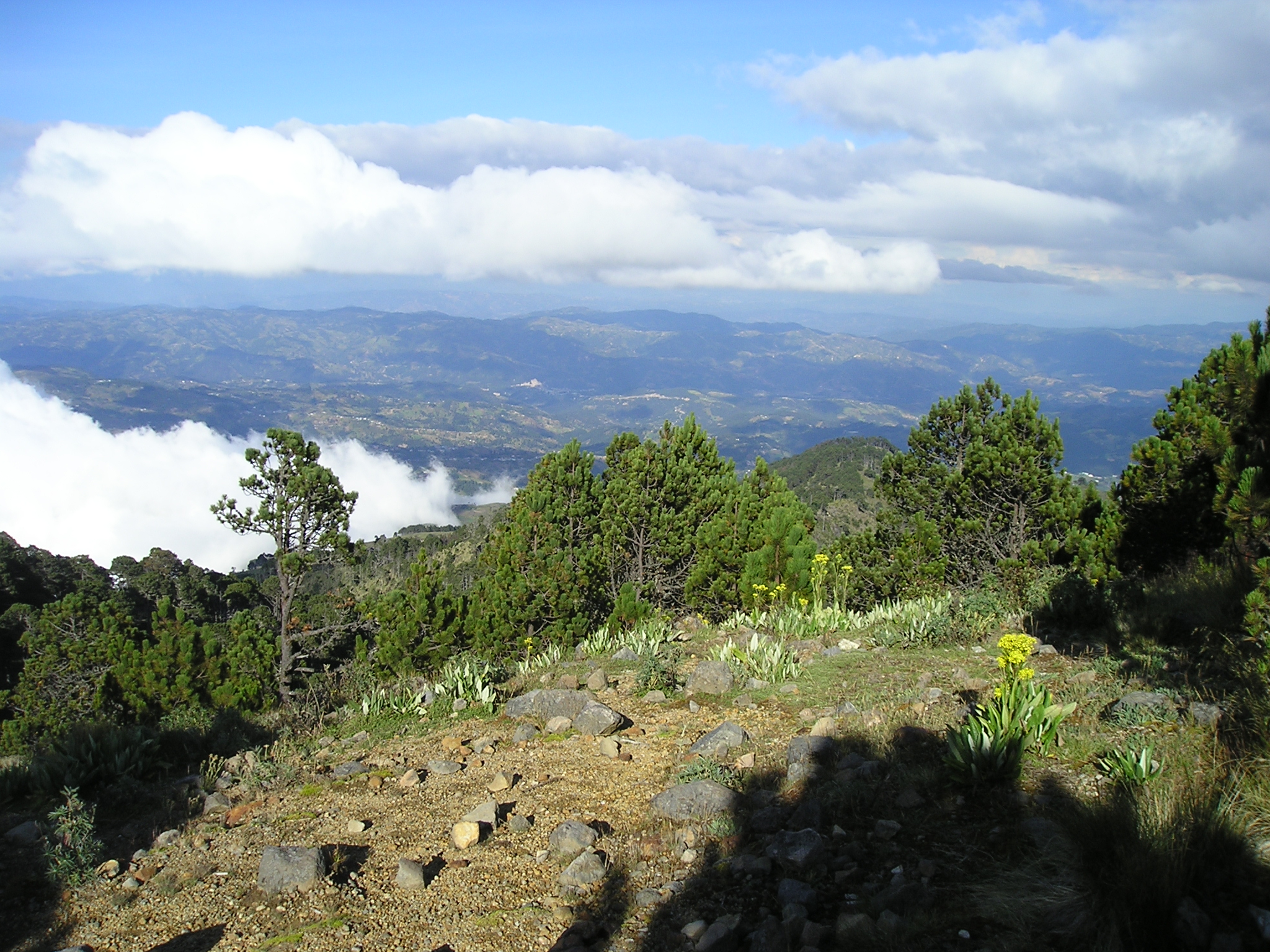
- Central American montane forest, with Pinus hartwegii, on the slopes of Tajumulco volcano, Guatemala.

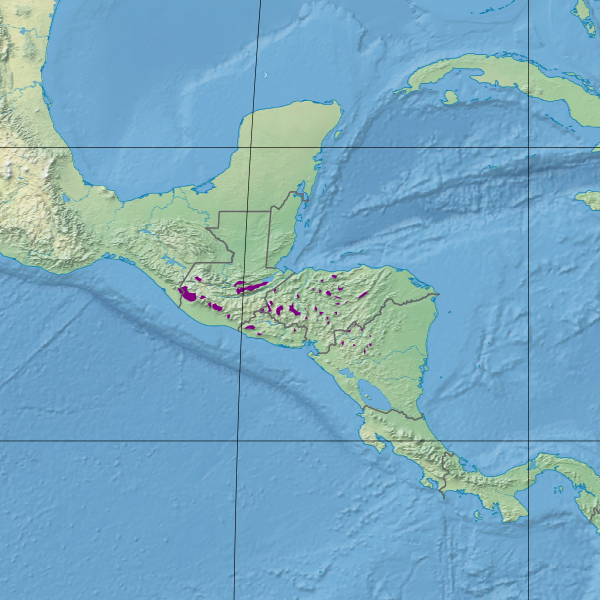
- Ecoregion territory (in purple)

Ecology
- Realm: Neotropical
- Biome: tropical and subtropical moist broadleaf forests
- Borders: Central American pine–oak forests; Central American Atlantic moist forests

Geography
- Area: 13,200 km^{2} (5,100 sq mi)
- Countries: List: Mexico (Chiapas); Guatemala; El Salvador; Honduras; Nicaragua

Conservation
- Conservation status: Vulnerable
- Protected: 31.34%

The Central American montane forests are an ecoregion of the tropical and subtropical moist broadleaf forests biome, as defined by the World Wildlife Fund, located in mountains of Central America.

== Geography ==
Central American montane forests consist of forest patches located at altitudes ranging from 1,800–4,000 metres (5,900–13,100 ft), on the summits and slopes of the highest mountains in Central America, including the Sierra Madre de Chiapas. It extends from Chiapas state in southeastern Mexico, through Guatemala, El Salvador, and Honduras, to northern Nicaragua.

The montane forests ecoregion is surrounded at lower elevations by the Central American pine–oak forests, except for the enclaves in northern Guatemala, northern Honduras, and central Nicaragua, which are bounded by the Central American Atlantic moist forests.

The ecoregion covers an area of 13,200 square kilometres (5,100 sq mi)^{2}. The ecoregion has a temperate climate with relatively high precipitation levels.

== Climate ==
The climate is humid and montane. Average annual rainfall ranges from 2000 to 4000 millimeters, with many areas experiencing regular heavy cloud cover. At the highest elevations, regular nighttime frosts occur between December and March.

== Flora ==
Plant communities include lower montane wet forest, lower montane moist forest, montane forest, and subalpine grassland.

The Guatemalan subalpine grassland plant community occurs above 3,050 m (10,000 ft) on the high volcanoes on the border between Guatemala and Mexico's Chiapas state, including Volcán Tacaná and Volcán Tajumulco. On Tacaná, subalpine grasslands occur above a belt of Juniperus standleyi shrubs that define the treeline at about 4000 meters elevation. The subalpine grasslands are dominated by Lupinus montanus and tussocks of the grass Calamagrostis vulcanica growing up to 1 meter high. Other grasses and herbaceous plants include Alchemilla pinnata, Arenaria bryoides, Draba volcanica, Festuca tolucensis, Gentiana pumilio, Gnaphalium salicifolium, Haplopappus stolonifer, Lobelia nana, Luzula racemosa, Pernettya prostrata, Potentilla heterosepala, Viola nannei, Weldenia candida, and Werneria nubigena. Mosses form the ground layer, and the moss Racomitrium crispulum dominates rocky outcrops. Other subalpine grasses include Bromus carinatus, Briza rotunda, Festuca amplissima, Muhlenbergia gigantea, M. macroura, M. robusta, Piptochaetium virescens, Stipa ichu, and Trisetum irazuense.

== Fauna ==
The horned guan (Oreophasis derbianus) is an endemic bird.

The narrow-nosed harvest mouse (Reithrodontomys tenuirostris) is endemic to the subalpine grasslands.

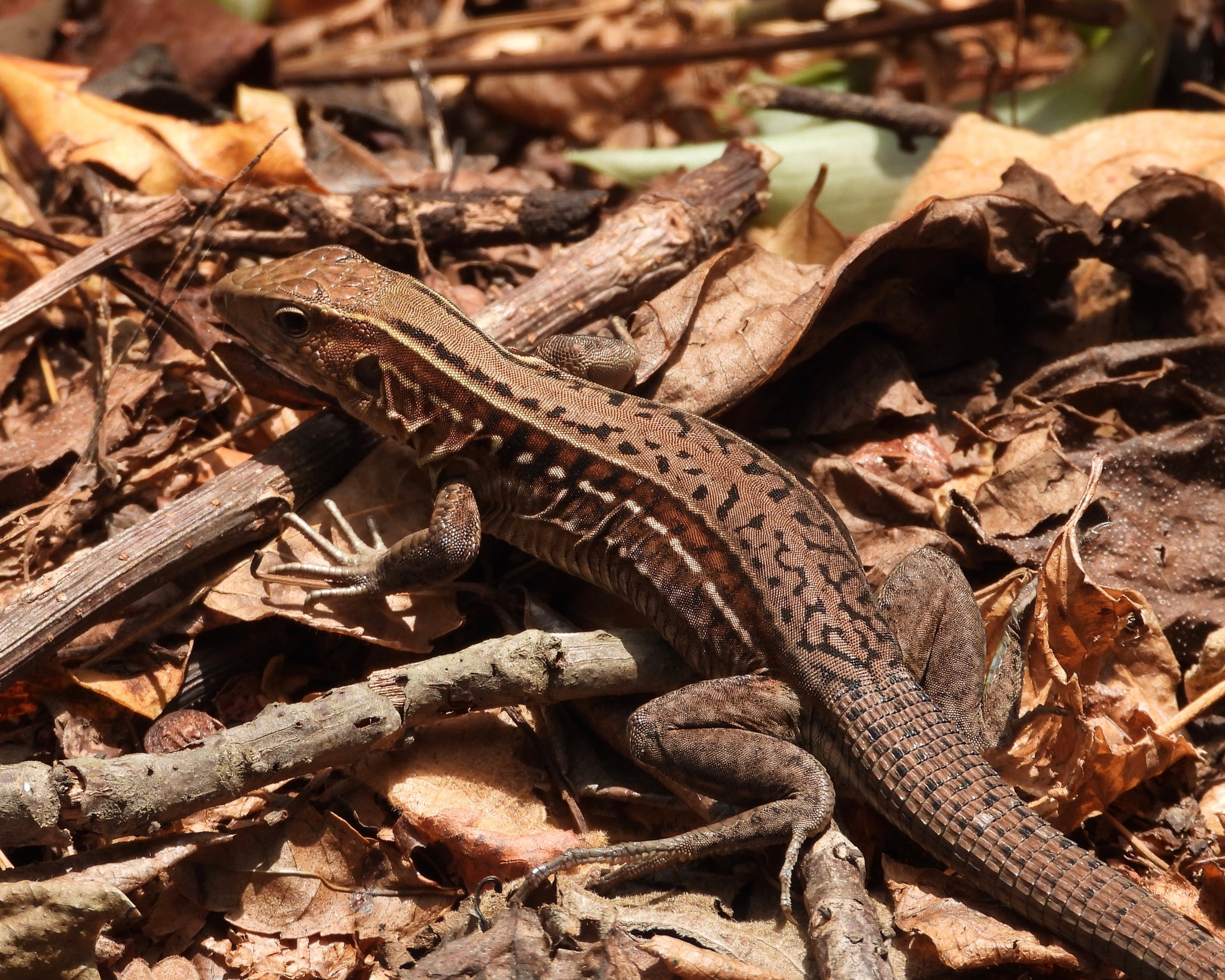
Holcosus undulatus in Antigua Guatemala, Guatemala

== Protected areas ==
31.34% of the ecoregion is in protected areas. Protected areas include La Tigra National Park (242.4 km^{2}), Cerro Saslaya National Park (150 km^{2}), Lago de Yojoa Multiple Use Area (442.3 km^{2}), Montecristo National Park (19.7 km^{2}), Macizos de Peñas Blancas Natural Reserve (113.1 km^{2}), Cordillera Dipilto and Jalapa Natural Reserve (412 km^{2}), Cerro Kilambe Natural Reserve (101.3 km^{2}), Cerro Tisey–Estanzuela Nature Reserve (93.4 km^{2}), Montecristo Trifinio National Park (82.9 km^{2}), and Celaque National Park (266.3 km^{2}).
