= List of Ramsar sites in Honduras =

The list of Ramsar sites in Honduras includes wetlands in Honduras that are considered to be of "international importance" under the Ramsar Convention. For a full list of all Ramsar sites worldwide, see the Ramsar list of wetlands of international importance.

== List of Ramsar sites ==
Name	Location	Area (km^{2})	Designated	Description	Image
Barras de Cuero y Salado	Atlántida	132.25	23-06-1993		
Laguna de Bacalar	Gracias a Dios	73.94	03-02-2003		
Parque Nacional Jeanette Kawas	Atlántida; 15°49′6″N 87°22′3″W	781.50	28-03-1995	Made up of varied marine, terrestrial and wetlands ecosystems, the park includes beaches, tropical forests, inundated forests, mangroves forests, lagoon and rivers.	
Refugio de Vida Silvestre Punta Izopo	Atlántida; 15°48′51″N 87°22′59″W	112.00	20-03-1996		
Sistema de Humedal Laguna de Alvarado	Cortés	138.46	02-02-2019		
Sistema de Humedales Cuyamel-Omoa	Cortés	300.29	02-02-2013		
Sistema de Humedales de la Isla de Guanaja	Islas de la Bahía	131.48	25-10-2021		
Sistema de Humedales de la Isla de Utila	Islas de la Bahía	162.26	02-02-2013		
Sistema de Humedales de la Zona Sur de Honduras	Tegucigalpa	697.11	10-07-1999		
Sistema de Humedales de Santa Elena	Islas de la Bahía	15.428	22-03-2018		
Sistema de Humedales Laguna de Zambuco	Atlántida	6.49	22-04-2013		
Subcuenca del Lago de Yojoa	Comayagua, Cortés and Santa Bárbara; 14°52′1″N 87°58′59″W	436.40	05-06-2005		

== See also ==
- Ramsar Convention
- List of Ramsar sites worldwide
