= Rosario Mining Company =

Mining company in Honduras and Nicaragua

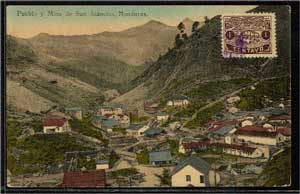
Rosario Mining Company Post card of San Juancito.

The New York and Honduras Rosario Mining Company (NYHRMC), known as Rosario Mining Company, was an American-owned corporation that owned and operated the Rosario mine, a gold and silver producer in central Honduras and Nicaragua.

== History ==
=== 1880 ===
The President of Honduras, Marco Aurelio Soto, offered companies that invested in the mine in San Juancinto a 20-year exemption from all taxes. In 1880, Julius Valentine, of New York City founded the New York and Honduras Rosario Mining Company, exchanging 50% of the Company's stock for the mining rights of the El Rosario deposits at San Juancito which were owned by Soto. Washington S. Valentine, son of Julius took over his father's post and became the figurehead of the corporation. The firm would soon become the largest mining company in the country. The Valentines also secured control of the wharf and railway at Puerto Cortes on the Honduran Atlantic Coast. In 1888, Washington Valentine founded the first private bank in Honduras, Banco de Honduras, in Tegucigalpa. Valentine and the Honduras President, Luis Bogran, owned shares in the bank.

Marco Aurelio Soto, was a major shareholder in the mining company. One of his sons married a daughter of Washington Valentine.

The Rosario Mine consisted of six holdings, each of 600 yds. long by about 200' wide, somewhat less than 500 acres (2.0 km^{2}), where it had all mining, timber and water rights.

=== 1900 – 1929 ===
By 1904 accretions by Honduras Government grant and purchase increased the territory to over 12,000 acres (20 square miles). By purchase it had acquired the timber rights in the adjoining towns of Cantarranas and Valle de Angels. The mine had 16 levels, 100 feet (30 m) apart, with regular connections. The deepest level runs about 1 1/2 miles into the mountain. Ore reserves estimates in 1904 were 64,897 tons. In that year the company produced 1,172,377 oz. of silver, 5,202 oz. of gold, of a total value of $721,374.87. Expenses in Honduras were $396,842.72 and gross expenditures were $543,294.16, leaving a net profit of $217,289.78.

On August 24, 1916 the stockholders of the New York & Honduras Rosario Mining Company voted to increase the board from nine to eleven. One of the new vacancies was filled by H. A. Guess, Managing Director of the mining department of the American Smelting & Refining Company, owned by Daniel Guggenheim. He has been identified with that company for fifteen years, and was also consulting engineer of the Braden Cooper and Chile Cooper Companies.

On April 30, 1917, the Company secured a controlling interest in the San Marcos mine, located at Sabana Grande, Honduras, and owned by the Sabana Grande Honduras Mining Company.

William A. Prendergast was selected as president of the company in 1919. By 1920 WS Valentine was not in the Board of Directors anymore. In 1922 Prendergast becomes chairman of the Board of Directors and Lewis L. Clarke, president of the Company.

=== 1930 – 1978 ===
In 1930 the Board of Directors was: WM. A. Prendergast, Chairman; Sidney Abbey; W.C. Langley; Lewis L. Clarke; W.L. Saunders; H. A. Guess; M. F. Soto; Irving Heidell; Ambrose G. Todd; Dr. J. Ralph Jacoby; Dr. Julius J. Valentine; P.R. Weiler.

In 1954, Robert M. Reininger took over leadership of the 75-year-old New York and Honduras Rosario Mining Company, which then held only one old, depleted gold mine and a small new startup mine, El Mochito, in Honduras. From these limited resources, Reininger built Rosario into a powerful and diversified mining and oil company, with interests stretching out to North America, South America, and the North Sea.

Under Reininger's leadership, El Mochito, with its rich ore and spectacular wire silver, soon became Central America's largest precious and base metals producer. Out of El Mochito's profits, Rosario made successful investments in new projects in the United States, Canada, Mexico, Peru, Nicaragua, and the Dominican Republic, as well as major Canadian gas discovery in 1969 and 1970s oil play in the British North Sea. From these projects flowed a cornucopia of gold, silver, copper, lead, zinc, mercury, granite, limestone, and petroleum. These properties, largely developed internally, multiplied the value of the company many times from 1954 through 1980, when Rosario was acquired by AMAX, Inc. Jorge Blanco was made President and led the company until his retirement. He was able to negotiate the terms of the settlement of the indemnification for the mines (La Rosita, et al confiscated by the Sandinista regime) with the post Sandinista government of Violeta Barrios de Chamorro. He led the company until his retirement in 1998.

In 1969, Rosario discovered the Pueblo Viejo oxide gold deposit in the Dominican Republic, which became at startup in 1975 one of the largest gold mines in the Americas, producing more than 400,000 ounces per year. Also in 1969, Rosario discovered Alberta's prolific Dunvegan Gas Field, up to that time the largest gas field found in Canada. In the 1960s, the company acquired an industrial minerals business, producing granite and limestone in Florida. In 1973, the company was rename Rosario Resources Corporation to reflect its greater geographic and product diversification. In 1976, Rosario's acquisition of the Fresnillo Company in Mexico helped it become the largest silver producer in the Western Hemisphere.

In the late 1970s, the rapid rise of prices for all of Rosario's products resulted in spectacular profits for the company, and it became a highly visible target for larger companies searching for growth. After a takeover fight, Reininger negotiated highly rewarding terms for the merger of the company into AMAX in April 1980. AMAX Inc. acquired Rosario Resources Corporation for $465 million. The Company independent life ended.

In 1993, AMAX was merged with Cyprus Minerals Company to create Cyprus Amax Resources.

== Mining in Honduras ==
The mountains around Tegucigalpa were largely known to contain gold and silver deposits since Spanish settlement in the area, which led to the area being visited by fortune seekers from Central America and the United States, among other locations.

In 1880, after successful negotiations with the fragile Honduran government, The New York and Honduras Rosario Mining Company was established in the US. The mining firm took a well-known mine in San Juancito, 40 km northeast of Tegucigalpa, and in the next decade produced three million dollars in silver and gold. By the beginning of the 20th century it had more than one thousand workers.

The mineral wealth of the San Juancito mountains was first discovered by native Indians as early as the 15th century. It was later exploited by Spanish conquistadors. But it wasn't until 1880, and the arrival of the New York-based Rosario Mining Company, that the area was transformed.

Over the next few decades, the towns of El Rosario and San Juancito swelled in population from a few hundred to more than 40,000.

Trees were chopped down to provide lumber for houses and offices and to reinforce mine shafts.

The mine had the following veins: South San Miguel, North San Miguel-Concepcion, Rosario, San Joaquin, Candelaria, Guadalupe Vein, West Vein, South West Vein, Jucuara Vein, Colonia Vein, Nueva Vein Socorro Vein, San Vicente Vein, Capitana Vein, Culebra Vein, Crisanta Vein, Buena Ventura, Northwest, Catalina, North, Los Cedros.

During its 74 years of operation, the New York and Honduras Rosario Mining Company extracted $100 million (U.S.) worth of gold, silver, copper and zinc from the San Juancito mountains.

The Rosario had an enormous impact on the local landscape. Entire woods were sacrificed to satisfy the large amount of timber needed to build the underground installations, buildings and houses. Long tracks were opened to transport wagons, carriages, minerals and men.

The Rosario Mining Company was rumoured to be involved in the change of the Honduras capital from Comayagua to its rival city of Tegucigalpa, which is closer to the mine. The then Honduran President, Marco Aurelio Soto, had shares in the firm.

The company reached its peak during the 1920s when more than three thousand miners worked in the mine, and there was an American consulate at El Rosario. The American firm built housing, offices, terraces, tunnels and several routes which cross the mountain region.

Perhaps as a result of the company's involvement in Honduras, the area became the first to have a hydroelectric plant and telegraph built, as well as the first Pepsi bottling plant in Central America. The adjacent town of San Juancito had electrical power before the capital city of Tegucigalpa.

Extraction in the mine ceased in 1954, after 75 years, due to a general strike. The mining company closed and thousands of people left the area in search of work. The intervening half-century allowed the forest to regrow, and much of the Rosario mine workings are now within La Tigra National Park.

== Mining in Nicaragua ==
=== Bonanza ===
In 1935, NYHRMC acquired an option on some gold mining properties in Nicaragua. These properties were the Bonanza Group of Mines, and those adjoining belonging to the Eden Mining Company and Tunky Transportation and Power Company, controlled by Benj. C. Warnick & Company, Limited, of Wilmington, Delaware. The original option was obtained August 2, 1935, but was not to become operative until title to the Bonanza Group has been perfected, which was not accomplished until June 12, 1936, and the original option was then merged into one bearing date of July 15, 1936, providing for an examination period of eighteen months, subject to extension under certain conditions.

Associated with NYHRMC in the procurement of, and all rights under the option, were the American Smelting and Refining Company (53.9%), Premier Gold Mining Company (10%), Terra Nova Properties Limited (5%), H.A. Guess (1.1%). NYHRMC kept 30% of shares. There were also acquired by purchase the properties of the Constancia Consolidated Incorporated, the Experiencia Mine, and an option of the Lone Star Mine. All of these properties were contiguous.

On Jun 22, 1936 the NYHRMC signed a contract with the Government of Nicaragua to initiate a mining operation in the Pis Pis District of the Department of Zelaya. On September 11, 1936, the contract was transferred to Neptune Gold Mining Company. This contract included rights on an area twelve miles (19 km) long and two miles (3.2 km) wide.

On January 14, 1938, it was decided to exercise the options. The properties and those acquired by purchase, were transferred to a new company, the Neptune Gold Mining Company, organized under the laws of the State of Delaware, with a capital stock of 20,000 shares of no par value. Its officers were: Harry A. Guess, President; William A. Prendergast, Vice-President; Forrest G. Hamrick, Vice-President; John C. Emison, Treasurer; Edwin C. Corson, Assistant Treasurer; George A. Brockington, Secretary; Howard L. Goodenough, Assistant Secretary. Its Directors were Harry A. Guess, William A. Prendergast, Forrest G. Hamrick, Clyde M. Spargo, and Richard F. Goodwin.

On July 10, 1940, the contract with the Nicaraguan Government was extended up to July 23, 1946. In 1946 the contract was extended once more up to July 23, 1951. Mariano Argüello Vargas, acted in representation of the Neptune Gold Mining Company. The contract established an annual fee of US$0.25 per hectare to be paid by the Company to the Nicaraguan Government.

=== Siuna ===
Gold mineralization was first discovered in the Siuna area in the late 1800s by indigenous people that reported 'favourable results' from gold panning. At the end of the 19th century, José Dámaso Valle, a prospector from León who discovered 14 gold mines and registered them in his name in the Bluefields Registry Office. The first organized, small-scale mining was carried out by the La Luz and Los Angeles Mining Company from 1908-1928, during which time an estimated 523,000 short tons grading 0.25 oz/ton gold was produced.

In 1909, La Luz and Los Angeles Mining Company, owned by James Gilmore Fletcher and his brothers, G. Fred & D. Watson Fletcher and Henry P. Fletcher, acquired a concession for mineral exploitation in Siuna. This company was based in Pittsburgh. Philander Knox was its lawyer. Adolfo Díaz, later President of Nicaragua, acted as secretary of the company from 1901 to 1910.

In July 1936, the La Luz property was optioned by The Tonopah Mining Company of Nevada, in association with Ventures Limited. The option was exercised in July 1938 and a Canadian corporation, La Luz Mines Limited, was formed. The cost of purchase, equipment, and operation was in excess of $3,000,000; Tonopah's investment was $240,000 with 120,000 shares of stock or ten percent of the outstanding shares. Ventures Limited and its affiliate held the remainder of the stock. The chief executives of La Luz Mines Limited were also the chief executives and members of the board of directors of The Tonopah Mining Company of Nevada. Ventures Limited was a large stockholder of Tonopah; Thayer Lindsley held the position of president for both companies. At the La Luz Mines Limited property, active construction started in November 1938 on a cyanide mill, electric plant, machine and carpenter shops, limekiln and commissary, and river station. The mill began operations in August 1939, although no development work was done in the mine during the period. The mine was successful showing net profits in the mid and late 1940s. In 1952, The Tonopah Mining Company of Nevada sold 6,000 shares of La Luz Mines Limited stock reducing its amount of shares to 114,000.

La Luz Mines Ltd. operated the gold mine continuously by underground and open pit methods until 1968. Production was only halted when a hurricane permanently damaged the mine's hydroelectric plant. During this period, an estimated 17 million short tons grading 0.12 oz/ton gold was produced. Nonetheless, due to the increase in the price of copper during the Vietnam War, and the discovery of the copper mine in Rosita, this company had the greatest overall earnings in Nicaragua in the 1960s. In 1973, Rosario Mining Company bought the actions for $1,468,425 (USD). In 1978, sales exceeded $61,692 (USD).

== Mining in El Salvador ==
NYHRMC operated an underground mine on the El Dorado property, 65 km east of San Salvador, from 1948 to 1953, producing approximately 270,000 tonnes of ore yielding about 72,500 troy ounces (2,250 kilograms) of gold at an average grade of 9.7 g/t from workings centered on the Minita vein system (one of a large number of gold-bearing veins and vein systems identified on the El Dorado project). Gold was recovered in a simple cyanide mill and recoveries in excess of 90% were achieved.
