= Cortes salamander =

Conservation status
- Endangered (IUCN 3.1)

Scientific classification
- Kingdom: Animalia
- Phylum: Chordata
- Class: Amphibia
- Order: Urodela
- Family: Plethodontidae
- Genus: Cryptotriton
- Species: C. nasalis

Binomial name
- Cryptotriton nasalis (Dunn, 1924)

Synonyms
- Oedipus nasalis Dunn, 1924; Chiropterotriton nasalis (Dunn, 1924); Nototriton nasalis (Dunn, 1924); Nototriton wakei Campbell and Smith, 1998; Cryptotriton wakei (Campbell and Smith, 1998)

Species of amphibian

Cortes salamander (Cryptotriton nasalis) is a species of salamander in the family Plethodontidae. It is found in the Sierra de Omoa in northwestern Honduras and Sierra de Caral in eastern Guatemala, close to the border with Honduras. The vernacular name Cortes salamander refers to the Cortés Department where the type locality is located, whereas the alternative name Cortez' hidden salamander with the spelling "Cortez" and the apostrophe are errors.

== Taxonomy and systematics ==
Cryptotriton nasalis was described by Emmett Reid Dunn in 1924 as Oedipus nasalis. Nototriton wakei, known only from the holotype and named for David B. Wake, is considered a junior synonym.

== Description ==
Cryptotriton nasalis are tiny emo salamanders. Males measure 24–32 mm (0.94–1.26 in) and adult females 28–35 mm (1.1–1.4 in) in snout–vent length (SVL). The tail is longer than the body in males (range 1.14–1.35 times the SVL) and many females (range 0.80–1.27 times the SVL). The head is moderately long and broad. The nostril openings are large and the eyes are protuberant. The limbs are slender and comparatively long. The fingers and the toes are partially webbed. The upper surfaces are dark brown with paler brown mottling behind the eyelids and along the middorsal line to the tail base. The upper surfaces of the limbs are paler than the body, whereas the tail is darker than the body.

== Habitat and conservation ==
Cryptotriton nasalis occurs in pre-montane and lower montane wet and cloud forests at elevations of 1,150–2,200 m (3,770–7,220 ft) above sea level. It tolerates some habitat modification. It is an arboreal salamander that lives in bromeliads. It is reasonably common in the Cusuco National Park in Honduras, whereas only one specimen is known from Guatemala, despite research activity in the area. The Guatemalan location is near the Sierra Caral Amphibian Reserve. It also occurs in the Cerro Azul de Copán National Park. The species is threatened by the loss of its forest habitat caused by expanding subsistence agriculture and illegal logging. These threats also impact the Cusuco and Sierra Caral protected areas.
