= Tawahka Asagni Biosphere Reserve =

Protected area in Honduras

- IUCN category VI (protected area with sustainable use of natural resources)
- Area: 2,509.42 km^{2} (968.89 sq mi)
- Designation: Biosphere reserve
- Designated: 1999
- Governing body: Forest Conservation Institute (ICF)

Tawahka Asagni Biosphere Reserve is a protected area in Honduras. The reserve was established in 1999, and covers an area of 2509.42 km^{2}.

The reserve is surrounded by other protected areas. It adjoins Río Plátano Biosphere Reserve on the north, Warunta National Park and Rus Rus Biological Reserve on the east, and Patuca National Park on the west and southwest. The Coco River forms the southeastern boundary of the reserve, where it adjoins Bosawás Biosphere Reserve in Nicaragua.

Lowland tropical moist forests, part of the Central American Atlantic moist forests ecoregion, cover the lower elevations of the reserve. The montane Central American pine-oak forests cover higher elevations of the reserve.
