= Royal National Park (disambiguation) =

Royal National Park may refer to:

- Royal National Park in Australia
- Royal Manas National Park in Bhutan
- Royal National City Park in Sweden
- Mount Royal National Park in Australia
- Royal Natal National Park in South Africa
- Hlane Royal National Park in Eswatini
- Port Royal National Park in Honduras
- Royal National Park railway station in Australia
