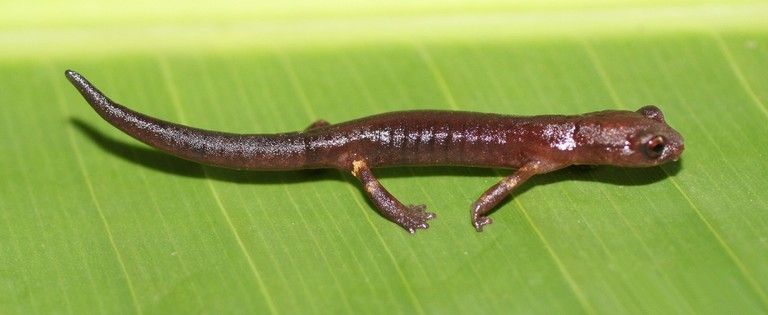

Conservation status
- Critically Endangered (IUCN 3.1)

Scientific classification
- Kingdom: Animalia
- Phylum: Chordata
- Class: Amphibia
- Order: Urodela
- Family: Plethodontidae
- Genus: Bolitoglossa
- Species: B. cataguana

Binomial name
- Bolitoglossa cataguana Townsend, Butler, Wilson, and Austin, 2009

= Bolitoglossa cataguana =

Species of salamander

Distribution in Honduras

Bolitoglossa cataguana, also known as the Cataguana salamander, is a species of salamander in the family Plethodontidae. It is endemic to Honduras and known from near Cataguana in the Marale municipality, Francisco Morazán Department.

== Description ==
The type series consists of the holotype, which is an adult female measuring 45 mm (1.8 in) in snout–vent length, three sub-adult and adult females between 35 and 50 mm (1.4 and 2.0 in), a sub-adult male measuring 40 mm (1.6 in), and two juveniles. There are 13 costal grooves. The sub-digital pads are well-developed and the toe tips are bluntly rounded. The tail, measuring 32 mm (1.3 in) in the holotype, is constricted basally and appears "swollen" after the constriction.

== Habitat and conservation ==
The type series was collected in lightly disturbed, mixed cloud forest on the edge of the Montaña de Yoro National Park at elevations of 1,800–2,080 m (5,910–6,820 ft) above sea level. Individuals were found active in vegetation up to 3 metres above the ground or resting during the daytime under a log. Coloration may vary by time of the day; during the daytime, the holotype was dorsally gray-brown with pale ocher cast and scattered dark brown punctations, whereas at the night it was pale grayish tan with pale pink cast.

Bolitoglossa cataguana is probably endemic to the Montaña de Yoro National Park. Its small range, rarity, and the threat posed by habitat loss caused by agricultural expansion, including marijuana plantations, warrant its listing as "critically endangered".
