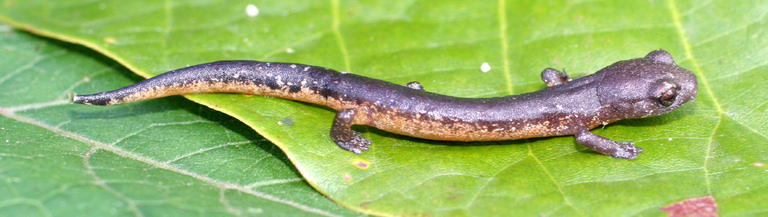

Conservation status
- Critically Endangered (IUCN 3.1)

Scientific classification
- Kingdom: Animalia
- Phylum: Chordata
- Class: Amphibia
- Order: Urodela
- Family: Plethodontidae
- Genus: Bolitoglossa
- Species: B. oresbia

Binomial name
- Bolitoglossa oresbia McCranie, Espinal, and Wilson, 2005

= Bolitoglossa oresbia =

Species of amphibian

Bolitoglossa oresbia is a species of salamander in the family Plethodontidae. It is endemic to Honduras and is known from the summit of Cerro El Zarciadero (its type locality) and the southwestern side of the nearby Cerro Azul Meámbar National Park, in the northern Comayagua Department.

== Description ==
The type series consists of two adult females measuring 51 and 55 mm (2.0 and 2.2 in) in snout–vent length (SVL) and 92 and 104 mm (3.6 and 4.1 in) in total length. A subadult female measured 34 mm (1.3 in) SVL. The snout is truncate in dorsal aspect and rounded in profile. The tail is strongly constricted basally. The limbs are relatively slender and long; the digits are moderately webbed. The upper parts are grayish brown or brownish olive with small, inconspicuous, irregularly shaped buff-yellow spots. The ventral surface is uniformly buff-yellow (holotype) or brownish olive with buff-yellow blotches (paratype).

== Habitat and conservation ==
The species inhabits cloud forests at elevations of 1,560–1,880 m (5,120–6,170 ft) above sea level. Specimens have been found in water-containing arboreal bromeliads, active on vegetation at night, in a standing, rotten tree trunk about 1 metre above the ground during the daytime, and in moist leaf litter during the morning.

The type locality is a small patch of forest (<1 ha) on a mountain top, completely surrounded by crop fields. Habitat loss may further threaten this population by leading to drying of the environment. Also use of the pesticides in the surrounding area is a potential threat. Fortunately, in 2008 the species was found inside the Cerro Azul Meámbar National Park, some 8 km (5.0 mi) from the type locality.
