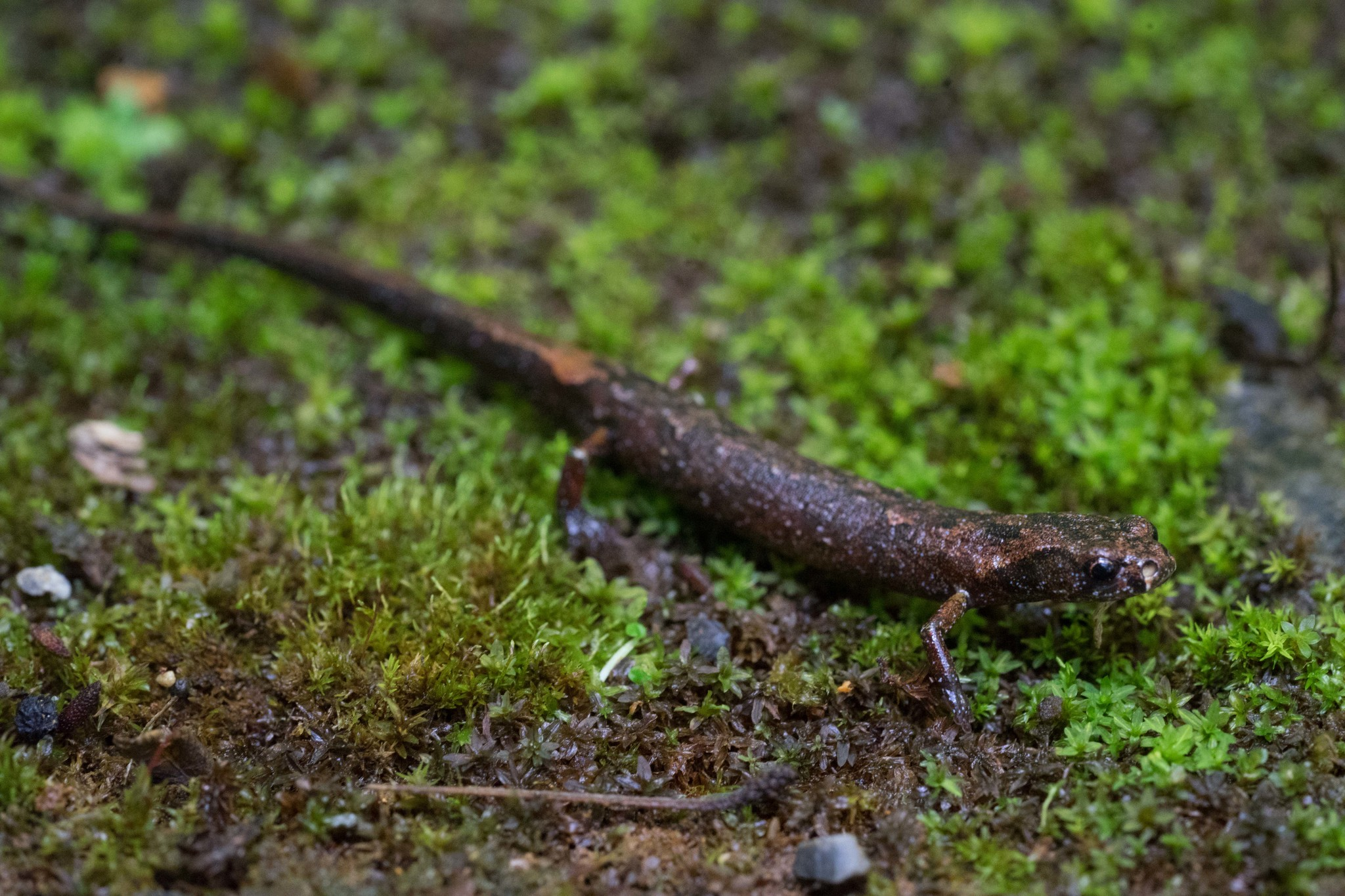

Conservation status
- Critically Endangered (IUCN 3.1)

Scientific classification
- Kingdom: Animalia
- Phylum: Chordata
- Class: Amphibia
- Order: Urodela
- Family: Plethodontidae
- Genus: Cryptotriton
- Species: C. veraepacis

Binomial name
- Cryptotriton veraepacis (Lynch & Wake, 1978)

= Baja Verapaz salamander =

Species of amphibian

The Baja Verapaz salamander (Cryptotriton veraepacis) is a species of salamander in the family Plethodontidae. It is endemic to Guatemala.

Its natural habitat is subtropical or tropical moist montane forests. It is threatened by habitat loss.
