= Sierra de las Minas hidden salamander =

Conservation status
- Critically Endangered (IUCN 3.1)

Scientific classification
- Kingdom: Animalia
- Phylum: Chordata
- Class: Amphibia
- Order: Urodela
- Family: Plethodontidae
- Genus: Cryptotriton
- Species: C. sierraminensis

Binomial name
- Cryptotriton sierraminensis Vásquez-Almazán, Rovito, Good, and Wake, 2009

Species of amphibian

The Sierra de las Minas hidden salamander (Cryptotriton sierraminensis) is one of seven species of salamander in the family Plethodontidae. In 2009, it was the most recent species to be described in Cryptotriton. It is found in the Sierra de las Minas of eastern Guatemala. Its natural habitat are cloud forests. It is threatened by habitat loss.
