= Weldenia volcanica =

Scientific classification
- Kingdom: Plantae
- Clade: Tracheophytes
- Clade: Angiosperms
- Clade: Monocots
- Clade: Commelinids
- Order: Commelinales
- Family: Commelinaceae
- Subfamily: Commelinoideae
- Tribe: Tradescantieae
- Subtribe: Thyrsanthemineae
- Genus: Weldenia
- Species: W. volcanica

Binomial name
- Weldenia volcanica (Benth.) M.Pell. & Espejo

Synonyms
- Lampra volcanica Benth.; Weldenia candida f. caerulea Matuda

Species of flowering plant

Weldenia volcanica is a species of flowering plant in the family Commelinaceae. It is a tuberous geophyte native to Mexico and Guatemala.
