= Weldenia =

- Weldenia candida

Scientific classification
- Kingdom: Plantae
- Clade: Tracheophytes
- Clade: Angiosperms
- Clade: Monocots
- Clade: Commelinids
- Order: Commelinales
- Family: Commelinaceae
- Subtribe: Thyrsanthemineae
- Genus: Weldenia; Schult.f.

Species
- Weldenia candida Schult.f.; Weldenia volcanica (Benth.) M.Pell. & Espejo

Synonyms
- Lampra Benth.; Rugendasia Schiede

Genus of flowering plants

Weldenia is a genus of flowering plants in the family Commelinaceae. It includes two species of tuberous geophytes native to Mexico and Guatemala.

- Weldenia candida Schult.f. – Mexico and Guatemala
- Weldenia volcanica (Benth.) M.Pell. & Espejo – Mexico and Guatemala
