= Cryptotriton =

Scientific classification
- Kingdom: Animalia
- Phylum: Chordata
- Class: Amphibia
- Order: Urodela
- Family: Plethodontidae
- Subfamily: Hemidactyliinae
- Genus: Cryptotriton; García-París & Wake, 2000

Species
- 7, See table.

Genus of salamanders

Cryptotriton is the genus of hidden salamanders in the family Plethodontidae, native to Mexico, Honduras and Guatemala. Most species in this genus are endangered or critically endangered with Cryptotriton sierraminensis being data deficient according to the IUCN.

== Species ==
The following seven species are included in this genus:

Binomial Name and Author	Common name
Cryptotriton alvarezdeltoroi Papenfuss & Wake, 1987	Alvarez del Toro's hidden salamander
Cryptotriton monzoni Campbell & Smith, 1998	Monzon's hidden salamander
Cryptotriton nasalis Dunn, 1924	Cortes salamander
Cryptotriton necopinus McCranie & Rovito, 2014
Cryptotriton sierraminensis Vasquez-Almazan, Rovito, Good & Wake, 2009	Sierra de las Minas hidden salamander
Cryptotriton veraepacis Lynch & Wake, 1978	Baja Verapaz salamander
Cryptotriton xucaneborum Rovito, Vásquez-Almazán, Papenfuss, Parra-Olea & Wake, 2015
