= Cryptotriton monzoni =

Conservation status
- Critically Endangered (IUCN 3.1)

Scientific classification
- Kingdom: Animalia
- Phylum: Chordata
- Class: Amphibia
- Order: Urodela
- Family: Plethodontidae
- Genus: Cryptotriton
- Species: C. monzoni

Binomial name
- Cryptotriton monzoni (Campbell and Smith, 1998)

Synonyms
- Nototriton monzoni Campbell and Smith, 1998

Species of amphibian

Cryptotriton monzoni is a species of salamander in the family Plethodontidae. It is endemic to Guatemala and is known only from near its type locality, Cerro del Mono, near La Unión, Zacapa Department. The specific name monzoni honors José Monzón, a Guatemalan entomologist who assisted the authors with their fieldwork. The common name Monzon's hidden salamander has been proposed for this species.

== Description ==
The holotype, an adult female, measures 22 mm (0.87 in) in snout–vent length and has a tail length of 23 mm (0.91 in). The snout is broadly rounded, and the eyes are protuberant. The head is slightly wider than the neck. The parotoid glands are underdeveloped, and the limbs are relatively long. Both the fingers and toes are moderately webbed and have subdigital pads. The dorsum is brown with bluish flecks, and the iris is copper. The iris is copper.

== Habitat and conservation ==
The type locality of Cryptotriton monzoni is a cloud forest 1,570 m (5,150 ft) above sea level. The holotype was found in a bromeliad about three metres above the forest floor.

Cryptotriton monzoni is apparently a rare species. Its threatened by habitat loss caused by logging and agricultural encroachment. Chytridiomycosis might also be a threat (a specimen of Bolitoglossa conanti was infected at the type locality).

Cryptotriton monzoni is only known from near La Unión, Zacapa, Guatemala
