= Alvarez del Toro's hidden salamander =

Conservation status
- Endangered (IUCN 3.1)

Scientific classification
- Kingdom: Animalia
- Phylum: Chordata
- Class: Amphibia
- Order: Urodela
- Family: Plethodontidae
- Genus: Cryptotriton
- Species: C. alvarezdeltoroi

Binomial name
- Cryptotriton alvarezdeltoroi (Papenfuss & Wake, 1987)

Synonyms
- Nototriton alvarezdeltoroi Papenfuss and Wake, 1987

Species of amphibian

Álvarez del Toro's hidden salamander (Cryptotriton alvarezdeltoroi), also known as Álvarez del Toro's salamander, is a species of salamander in the family Plethodontidae. It is endemic to Mexico where it is known from its type locality near Jitotol as well as a nearby site on the Mexican Plateau in the state of Chiapas.

== Etymology ==
The specific name, alvarezdeltoroi, is in honor of Mexican herpetologist Miguel Álvarez del Toro.

== Description ==
The holotype of Nototriton alvarezdeltoroi (an adult male) measure 26.6 mm (1.05 in) in snout–vent length and has a 32.1 mm (1.26 in) long tail. The dorsum and tail are a reddish brown with an irregular, obscure dorsal stripe. The limbs are orange. The snout is blunt with forward-pointing nostrils.

== Habitat ==
Its natural habitat is very moist cloud forest at elevations of 1,200–1,550 m (3,940–5,090 ft) asl. It has also been found at roadsides.

Like other members of the family Plethodontid, Crypto triton alvarezdeltoroi depends on wet microhabitats such as leaf litter and mossy logs within cloud forests. Studies on other Mexican salamanders in montane rainforests, for example, Pseudoeurycea Robertis, have shown that these habitats are climate- and deforestation-sensitive, and it is likely that C alavarezdeltoroi also has these types of ecological issues and dependency on microhabitats (Sunny et al., 2022; Ramires-Bautista et al., 2023).

== Conservation status ==
This rare species is only known from very few specimens. It is threatened by habitat loss caused by expanding agriculture and human settlements as well as logging.

Conservation should give the utmost importance to maintaining intact canopy cover and soil moisture to enable the species to survive.
