= Montaña Santa Bárbara National Park =

National Park in Honduras

- IUCN category II (national park)
- Location within Honduras
- Location: Honduras
- Coordinates: 14°54′56″N 88°07′54″W
- Area: 121.3 km^{2} (46.8 sq mi)
- Established: 1 January 1987

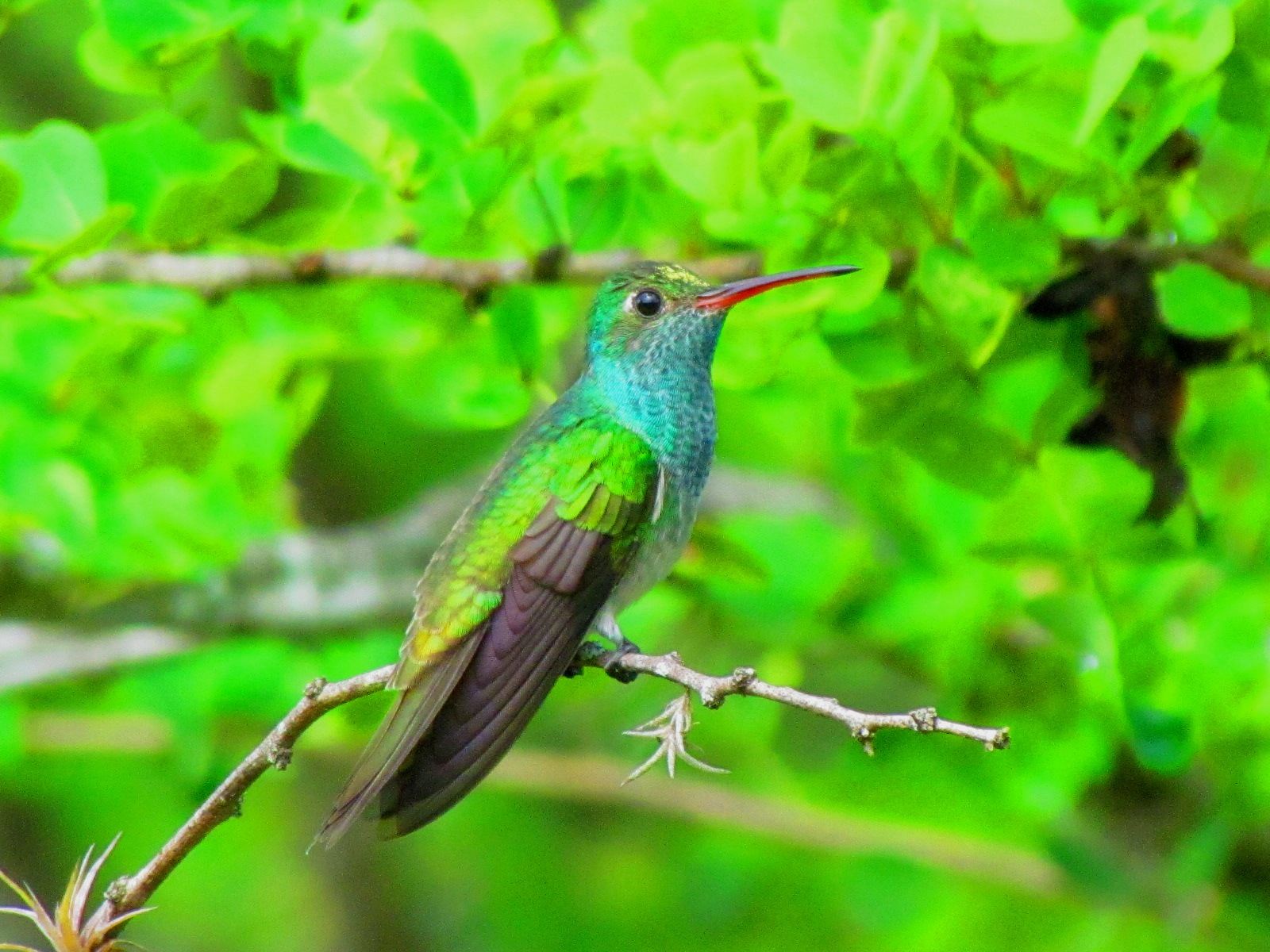
Male of Amazilia luciae in Santa Bárbara

Montaña Santa Bárbara National Park (previously named Santa Bárbara National Park) is a national park in Honduras. It was established on 1 January 1987 and covers an area of 121.3 square kilometres. It has an altitude of 2,777 metres.

Montaña de Santa Bárbara is an isolated karstic massif. It is bounded on the north by the Ulúa-Chamelecón Plain, and on the west by Lake Yojoa. There are tropical dry forests in the lowlands, moist forests at mid elevations, and montane forests and cloud forests at higher elevations.

Its peak can be reached from the southeast side, ascending from the village of Los Andes.
