= Macizos de Peñas Blancas Natural Reserve =

Nature reserve in Nicaragua

Coordinates: 13.253°N 85.664°W

Macizos de Peñas Blancas Natural Reserve is a nature reserve in Nicaragua. It is one of the 78 reserves that are under official protection in the country. It contains over 11,000 hectares of land, and protects late seral forest (Lsf) vegetation. There is a cloud forest with flora including orchids and bromeliads, and fauna including rare felines and birds. It was established in 1976 with 7,900 hectares.
