= Cuevas del Silvino =

National park in Izabal, Guatemala

Cuevas del Silvino National Park
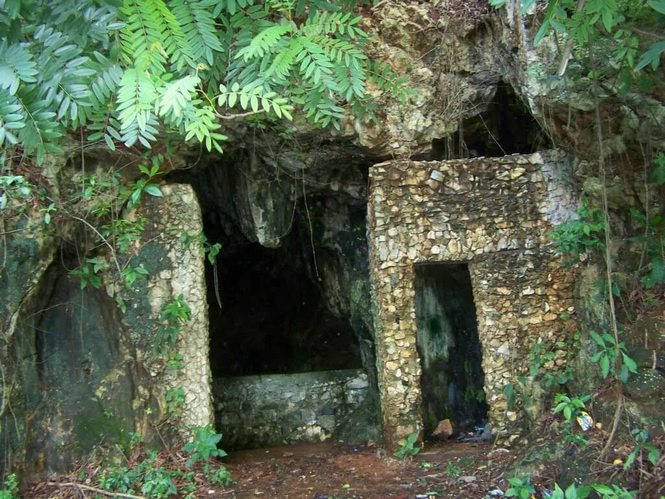
- Interactive map of Cuevas del Silvino; National Park
- Location: Izabal, Guatemala
- Coordinates: 15°28′28″N 88°49′41″W
- Area: 0.08 km^{2} (0.031 sq mi)
- Elevation: 60 m (200 ft)
- Established: Acuerdo Gubernativo 10-10-72
- Operator: CONAP

Cuevas del Silvino is a limestone cave system in Guatemala. It is located at km 260 on the road connecting Guatemala City to Puerto Barrios, in the municipality of Morales in the department of Izabal.

The Silvino cave system was declared a national park in 1972.
