= Cerro Tisey–Estanzuela Nature Reserve =

Nature reserve in Nicaragua

Coordinates: 13.022188°N 86.388351°W

Tisey Estanzuela Natural Reserve is a nature reserve in Nicaragua. It is one of the 78 reserves that are under official protection in the country.
