= Lake Yojoa =

Largest lake in Honduras

Lake Yojoa Lago de Yojoa
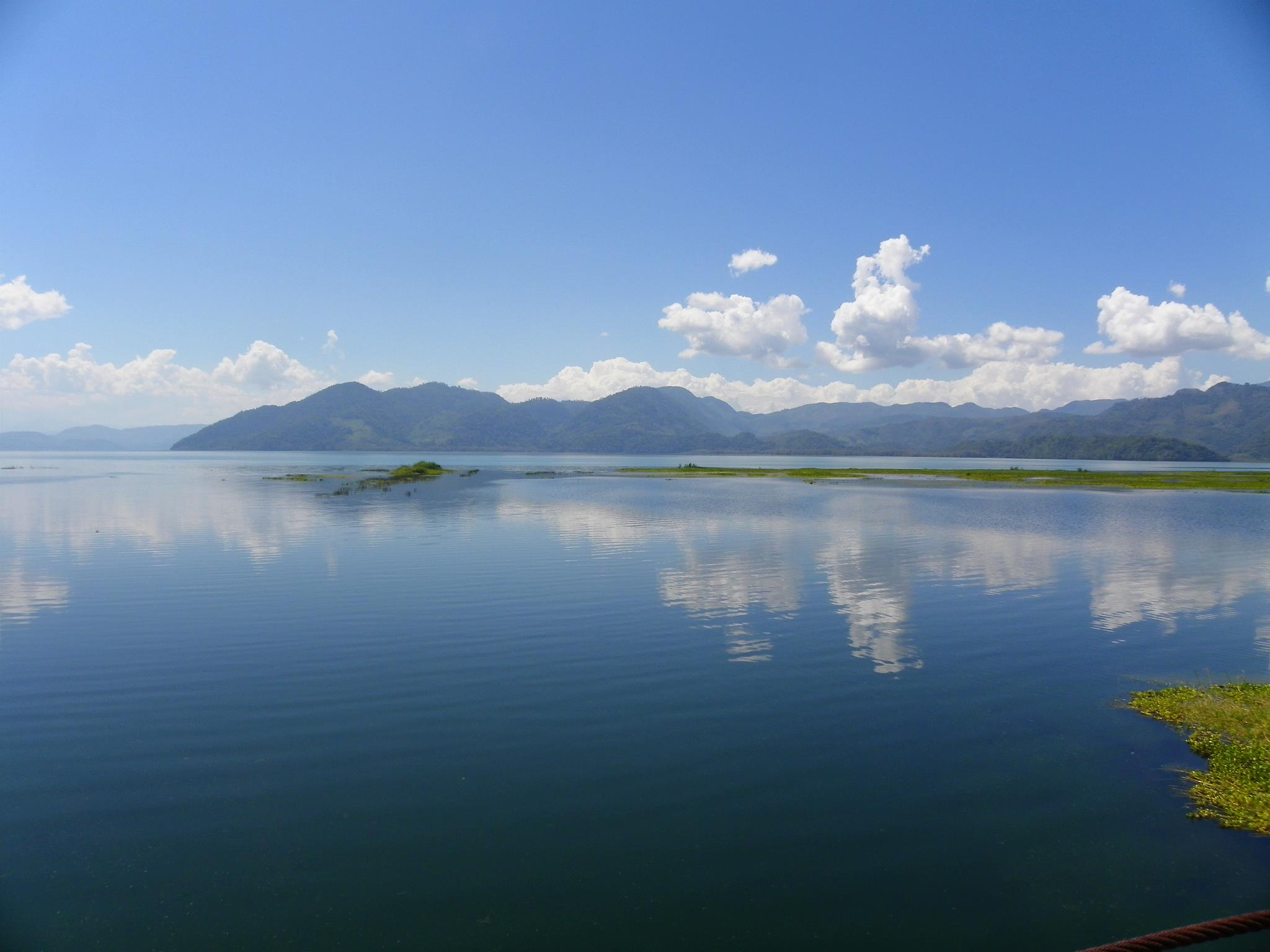

- Location within Honduras
- Coordinates: 14.867°N 87.983°W
- Basin countries: Honduras
- Surface area: 79 km^{2} (31 sq mi)
- Average depth: 15 m (49 ft)
- Surface elevation: c. 700 m (2,300 ft)

Ramsar Wetland
- Official name: Subcuenca del Lago de Yojoa
- Designated: 5 June 2005
- Reference no.: 1467

Lake Yojoa
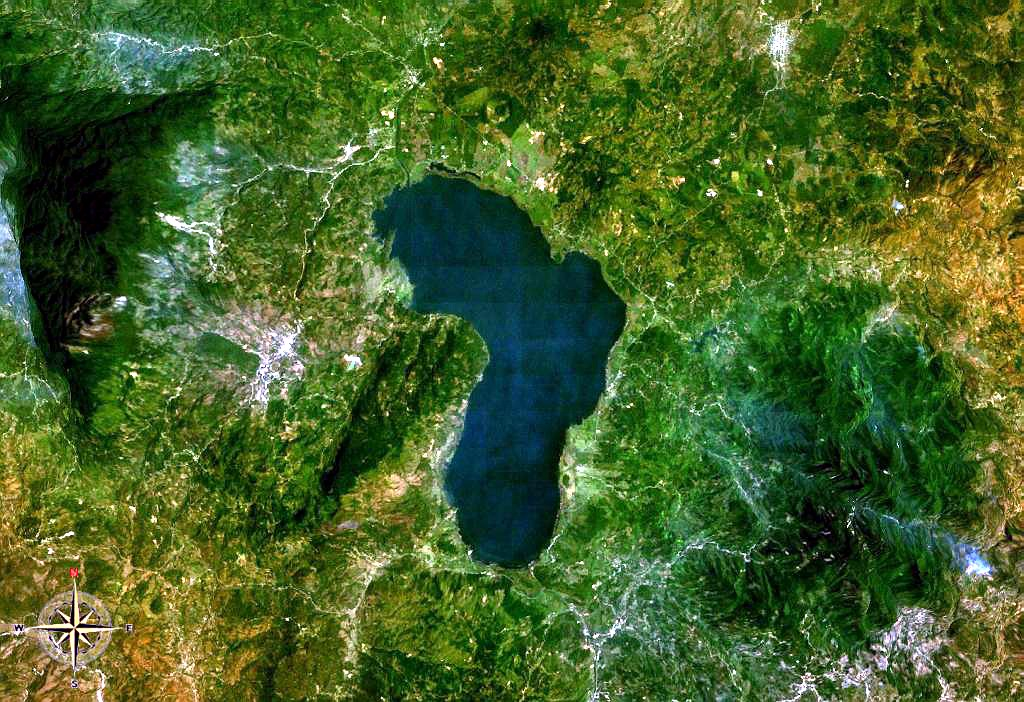
- Satellite photo of Lake Yojoa

Highest point
- Elevation: 700 m (2,300 ft)
- Coordinates: 14.867°N 87.983°W

Geography
- Location: Honduras

Geology
- Mountain type: Volcanic field with lava-dammed lake
- Last eruption: Unknown

Lake Yojoa is the largest lake in Honduras with a surface area of 79 square kilometers (31 square miles) and an average depth of 15 meters (49 feet). At an altitude of 700 meters (2,300 feet), it lies in a depression formed by volcanoes. The Lake Yojoa volcanic field consists of Pleistocene to Holocene scoria cones, craters, and lava flows.

The west side of the lake is bordered by steep mountains and Santa Bárbara National Park while the east side is adjacent to Cerro Azul Meambar National Park. The lake is situated on the highway that connects the two largest Honduran cities, Tegucigalpa and San Pedro Sula. For many people traveling between the cities, the lake serves as a rest area where they can appreciate the view and enjoy the fresh fried fish and other foods that are offered by the restaurants located on its banks.

Lake Yojoa is a popular fishing destination and the surrounding area has a rich biodiversity—almost 400 species of birds and 800 plant species have been identified in the region. However, it also is threatened by deforestation, cattle ranching, and development. The settlers of the communities around the lake are dedicated to the cultivation of fruits, vegetables and basic grains. Nevertheless, many of these inhabitants earn their living from the sale of fish originating from the lake.

People dedicate surrounding areas to the growing of coffee plants. Coffee grown near Lake Yojoa, in Santa Barbara, is particularly well-known.

== See also ==
- List of volcanoes in Honduras
