= San Juancito, Honduras =

San Juancito
- Nickname: San Juancito de las Minas
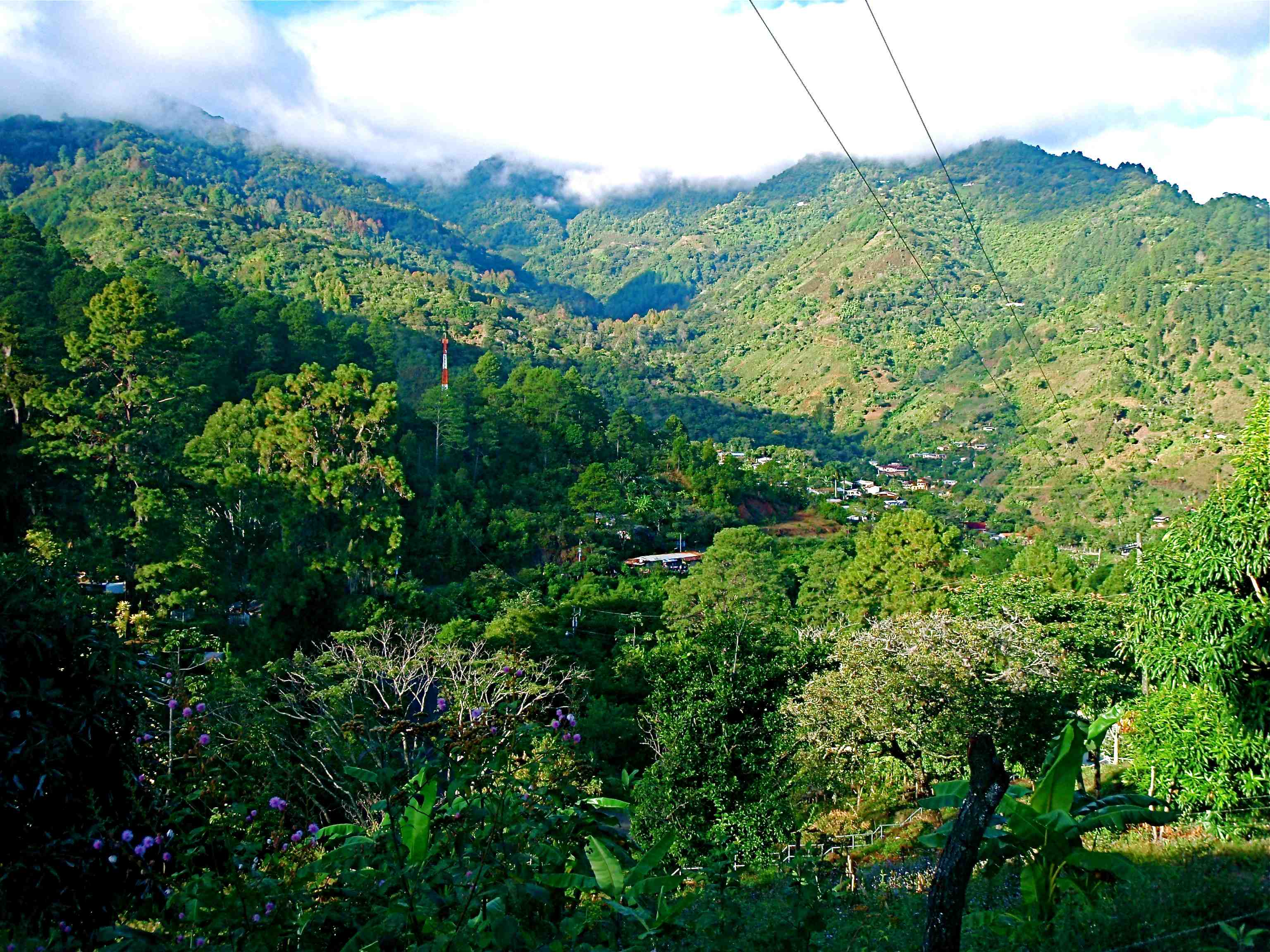

- Location within Honduras
- Coordinates: 14.219958°N 87.068367°W
- Country: Honduras
- Department: Francisco Morazán
- Municipality: Distrito Central
- Founded: 16th century

Government
  - Type: Democratic municipality
  - Mayor: Nasry Asfura (PNH)

Area
  - City: 5.2 km^{2} (2 sq mi)
- Elevation: 1,239 m (4,065 ft)

Population (2009)
  - City: 900
  - Metro: 1,400
- Time zone: UTC-6 (Central)
- Website: www.sanjuancito.com

San Juancito is a small town in central Honduras, located 40 km northeast of Tegucigalpa, the nation's capital. The town is in the department of Francisco Morazán. Including the dependent hamlets of Nuevo Rosario, Guacamaya, and Plan Grande, the population totals at about 1400. Its central neighborhood is depicted on the back of the 500-lempira bill.

While its history is linked to mining, its current importance lies in that it is located within the buffer zone of La Tigra National Park, which is a cloud forest ecosystem and Honduras' first national park. The park is a huge watershed, providing water for over a half million people in the capital; San Juancito is located on the northern side of the La Tigra, and has had paved access since 2003. It is the lesser-visited of the park's two entrances (the other being at Jutiapa, on the southwestern side of the park).

== History ==
The history of San Juancito is inextricably linked to the mineral wealth of the mountains in which it is perched. Before the arrival of the Spaniards, the descendants of today's Tolupan/Jicaque people exploited, in small scale, the minerals of the region. In the 16th century, the Spanish made a short-lived attempt at extracting ore from in the area's mountains. Using the indigenous population as labour, they proceeded to extract gold and silver from the mountainside; however after a few years, the indigenous population was so ravaged by disease and abysmal working conditions that the Spaniards, with no reliable source of labour left, relocated to other seemingly more viable sites in Honduras.

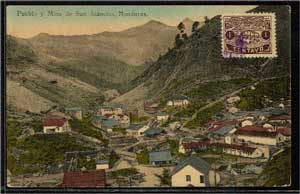
San Juancito's "Barrio El Centro" in the 1920s

In the late 19th century, mining activities were revived but on a much larger and highly organised scale. President Marco Aurelio Soto advertised the mineral wealth of San Juancito, with the intention of attracting foreign investment. In 1880, Julius Valentine, of New York City, founded the New York and Honduras Rosario Mining Company, exchanging 50% of the company's stock for the mining rights of the El Rosario deposits at San Juancito which were owned by Soto. Because of this, San Juancito may have played a role in the relocation of the nation's capital from Comayagua to Tegucigalpa in 1880. While popular myth holds that the capital was moved because of the unwillingness on the part of the Comayaguan elite to accept President Soto's indigenous wife into their social circles, the true motive behind the move was related to his business investments and the development of southern Honduras.

Between 1880 and 1954, the company extracted gold and silver from veins in the mountainside, most of which was destined for the United States. Julius Valentine's son, Washington Valentine, soon took over his father's post and became the figurehead of the corporation. At the onset of operations, the Honduran government provided the company with generous financial incentives, operating with essentially no tax burdens, shipping gold and silver to the US. However, by 1895, the company suffered setbacks from declining silver prices, significant tax burdens, and labor shortages. The company imported heavy machinery from the United States and was granted timber and water rights in the countryside. The timber harvests were utilised for housing construction and mine tunnel support and the water rights permitted the development of the country's first hydroelectric power. The result of this was incredibly rapid growth that meant that by 1888, the mines were far and away the most powerful economic interest in Honduras.

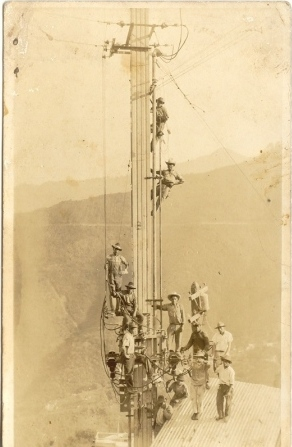
Men on the tower of the hydroelectric power plant.

During its heyday, technological advancements came to San Juancito before any town in Honduras. The first light bulb in Honduras flickered on in San Juancito as a result of the hydroelectric plant built by the mining company, also a national first. The first cinema in all of Central and South America was built in San Juancito. as well as the nation's first telegraph. Pepsi built the first bottling plant in all of Central America there, and a fully operating American Consulate was erected by the mining company's headquarters at over 1600 metres (5300 feet) above sea-level. In the early 20th century, San Juancito had a population of 44,000, roughly equalling that of Tegucigalpa at the time, and was a major trading centre in Central America.

Life in San Juancito during its mining days was highly segregated. The minority of foreign staff personnel lived in an established camp near the mining headquarters and the majority Honduran population lived below in San Juancito proper. The Honduran miners were well paid by local standards and enjoyed the benefits of schools and the hospital established by the company.

In 1954, due to the exhaustion of mineral reserves, which coincided with a national labor movement, and new mine development at El Mochito, Las Vegas, Sta. Barbara. El Rosario mine ceased operations and left San Juancito. With the company went the vast majority of the town's inhabitants, as it was the only major source of labour in the region; many of the El Rosario miners were subsequently employed at El Mochito.

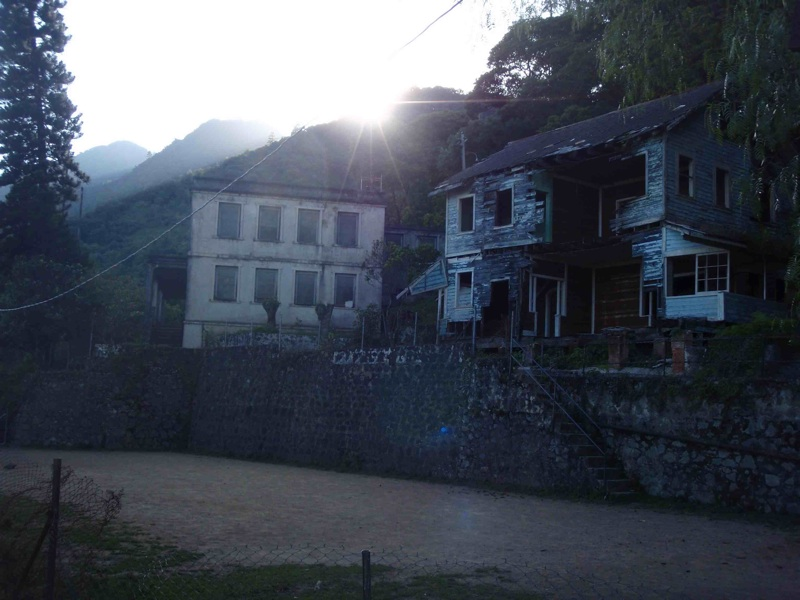
The abandoned U.S. Consulate (left) in Nuevo Rosario

In 1980, Honduras declared La Tigra as the nation's first National Park and San Juancito found itself located within the buffer zone at one of the two designated entrances. Many remnants of the former mining mecca such as mine tunnels and railworks can be found within the nuclear zone of the national park, as well as a number of historical buildings and homes erected by the mining company.

On October 30, 1998, Hurricane Mitch struck Honduras. It was and still is the most costly (in lives and money) natural disaster to ever befall the country. Its deluge of rain had a devastating effect on San Juancito with around 60 buildings destroyed by the cascading waters of the town's two rivers. In the aftermath of the hurricane, a large number of NGOs came to San Juancito to help with the rebuilding effort. While the skeletal remains of some buildings damaged by the hurricane can still be seen today, much of the infrastructure has been rebuilt.

== Geography ==
Since the closing of the mines, reforestation efforts have brought back foliage to previously barren swaths of mountainside. Accordingly, the pueblo sits in a verdant amphitheater of sorts, with the backdrop being dominated by the three highest peaks in the department: Cerro La Estrella (2,245 metres (7,365 ft)), Cerro El Volcán (2,270 metres (7,450 ft)) and Cerro La Peña de Andino (2,290 metres (7,510 ft)). In the immediate vicinity of the pueblo there is still some limited deforestation, the work of local small farmers using slash-and-burn agricultural techniques, mostly for banana cultivation.

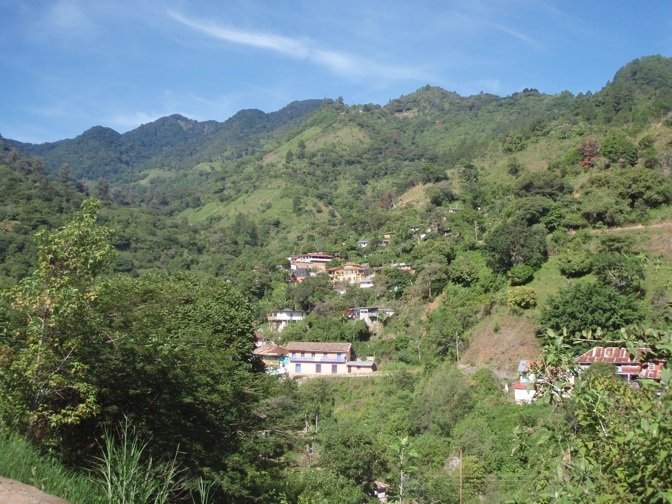
The steep setting of San Juancito, Barrio Arriba.

Because of its history as a mining town, San Juancito was not founded with thought being given to terrain. It is perched in the mountains on very uneven land, and therefore does not have the Spanish-inspired central layout that tends to be the style of rural Honduran communities. For this, San Juancito is really an agglomeration of four core barrios, and three outlying dependent hamlets. The four core barrios are known by residents as Barrio el Centro, Barrio Arriba, El Plan, and Carboneras, and are divided by rivers and precipices. Two rivers meet in Barrio El Centro, with two bridges traversing them. The three outlying dependent hamlets are known as Nuevo Rosario (the former headquarters of mining operations), Guacamaya, and Plan Grande. The first two are located along an old mining road about 350 meters (1150 feet) above San Juancito proper, each about 2.5 kilometers from the town center. Nuevo Rosario and Guacamayas are located at 1621 meters (5300 feet) and 1538 meters (5000 feet) above sea-level, respectively.

Of the four core barrios, El Plan is distinct in that many of its structures were built after Hurricane Mitch. It is located on a small mesa well above the river, and was chosen as the main redevelopment site when NGO efforts were working to provide housing to those displaced by the hurricane.

Barrio El Centro was the hardest hit by the hurricane, with most of the buildings lost having been located in this section of town. This barrio, along with Barrio Arriba, Carboneras, and the outlying hamlet of Nuevo Rosario contain the vast majority of San Juancito's historical structures, however mine-shafts dot the landscape indiscriminately.

== Ecology ==
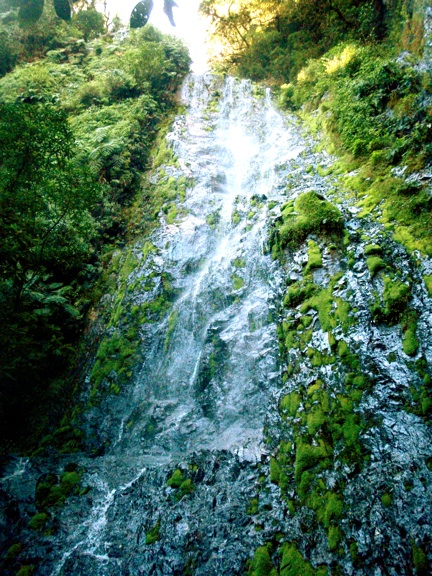
Epiphytes clinging to a waterfall in La Tigra.

The town of San Juancito is located in a subtropical moist forest, which transitions into cloud forest upon entering La Tigra National Park. As a result of the abundance and variety of flora and fauna supported by these ecosystems, San Juancito is in a biodiversity hotspot. The town center is located 2.5 kilometers (1.6 mi) from the entrance to the nuclear zone of the national park, which is actually in the hamlet of Nuevo Rosario. In La Tigra there are over 200 species of bird, including the resplendent quetzal and a variety of hummingbirds. The park is also home to monkeys, pumas, and ocelots. Aside from the wild fruits and vegetables that grow in the region, there is also an abundance of eucalyptus, sweet gum, oaks, Caribbean pines, Ocote, and avocado. A number of orchids can be found here as well. The common infiltration of clouds into the forest also means that the region abounds with ferns, bromeliads, and other epiphytic species.

== Climate ==
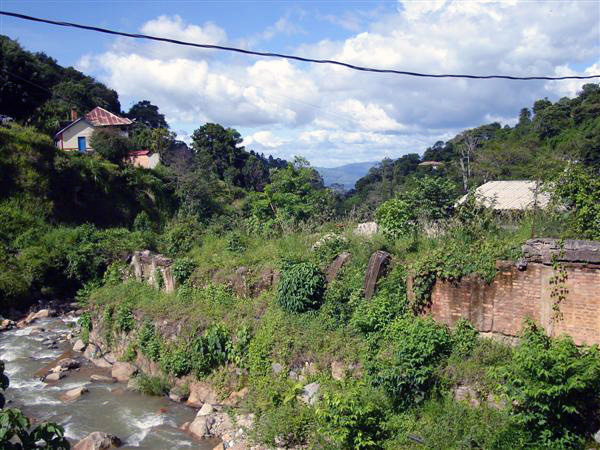
The river that crosses the town.

Because Honduras is situated within the tropics, San Juancito sees little temperature variation year round. As such, what is called winter is actually the rainy season, whereas what is called summer is actually the dry season. In the tropics, altitude plays a larger role in determining temperature than precipitation or time of year. San Juancito's location at 1239 meters (4027 feet) above sea-level ensures a temperate, if not slightly cool climate year round. Highs during the summer (March–June) tend to be around 26˚C (78˚F) with lows during this season averaging at about 18˚C (64˚F). The average winter high is 20˚F (68˚F), and the average winter low is about 14˚C (58˚F).

== Economy ==
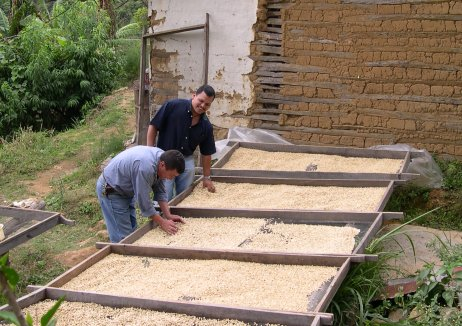
Drying and sorting organic coffee beans in San Juancito.

San Juancito's modern-day economy is heavily based in agriculture—most being small-scale coffee production—as its climate and altitude are incredibly conducive to the production of high quality coffee beans. COMISAJUL, a joint cooperative of a few hundred small coffee farmers in central Honduras, has its office in San Juancito.

Aside from coffee, San Juancito has a relatively diverse array of subsistence-based agricultural activities, with small plots of berries, potatoes, bananas, cabbage, celery, bitter oranges, avocado, pineapple, guava, corn, and other local fruits and vegetables all existing in the immediate vicinity of the community.

Much of San Juancito's male population works in a massive sugarcane cropping and refining operation located 10 kilometers to the south in the valley of Cantarranas, San Juan de Flores. Outside of agriculture many townspeople work in Tegucigalpa, as urban migration has put a strain on job opportunities in small communities like San Juancito.

San Juancito also has an art workshop, operated by the San Juancito Foundation, and located in a renovated Pepsi Co. bottling plant building. Most of the employees of the "Taller" as it is known, are women. The workshop produces extremely high quality paper, metal, and glass based functional artwork that is sold at a gallery in Tegucigalpa.

A small number of residents work part or full-time with AMITIGRA, the organization in charge of the administration and maintenance of La Tigra National Park.

== Education ==
San Juancito has a high school, Colegio Marcial Solis, and an elementary school, Escuela Marco Aurelio Soto, the latter being named for a president who played a large role in the history of the pueblo. There are also three small elementary schools in the outlying communities of Nuevo Rosario, Guacamaya, and Plan Grande.

Also providing independent trade-based education to the community are two initiatives set up by the San Juancito Foundation, the brainchild of Honduran artist Regina Aguilar. The aforementioned art workshop also operates as a training center for artisans who wish to fine-tune their skills, as well as offering scholarships and diplomas to adolescents who wish to pursue a career in art. The San Juancito Foundation also operates a school "La Escuela Magica," which is a free of charge art education center for children in the community.

== Transportation ==
=== Highways ===
In 2003, a paved two-lane road from Tegucigalpa reached San Juancito, connecting it to Honduras' growing network of highways. Currently, the road passes through the municipalities of Santa Lucía and Valle de Angeles on its way to San Juancito. Beyond San Juancito, the pavement continues 10 kilometers until Cantarranas (also known as San Juan de Flores). Currently, there is construction on the 30-kilometer segment to the north of Cantarranas toward the town of Talanga, connecting with the highway to Olancho. This segment, along with another segment bypassing Tegucigalpa on its way to the department of El Paraíso, and further on to Danlí and ultimately Nicaragua, was scheduled to be completed by 2011.

== Tourism ==
San Juancito sees few tourists because it is the most inaccessible of La Tigra's entrances, and because very little has been done to develop an infrastructure that promotes tourism.
