= Weldenia candida =

Scientific classification
- Kingdom: Plantae
- Clade: Tracheophytes
- Clade: Angiosperms
- Clade: Monocots
- Clade: Commelinids
- Order: Commelinales
- Family: Commelinaceae
- Subfamily: Commelinoideae
- Tribe: Tradescantieae
- Subtribe: Thyrsanthemineae
- Genus: Weldenia
- Species: W. candida

Binomial name
- Weldenia candida Schult.f.

Synonyms
- Rugendasia majalis Ehrenb. ex Hook.f. (1895), pro syn.; Rugendasia majalis Schiede (1841); Weldenia schultesii Schltdl. (1841)

Species of flowering plant

Weldenia candida is a species of flowering plant which grows natively in Mexico and Guatemala.

This herbaceous perennial has broad green, strap-shaped leaves growing in a rosette. The central, three-petalled, bright white flowers are borne over a long period in late spring and summer. Hardy down to −5 °C (23 °F), in temperate zones it prefers mild sheltered locations in full sun, with neutral or acid well-drained soil. It requires dry conditions over winter, so is best grown in an alpine house or similar, where protection can be provided.

The Latin specific epithet candida means "shining white".
