= Northern Honduras mangroves =

Ecological region

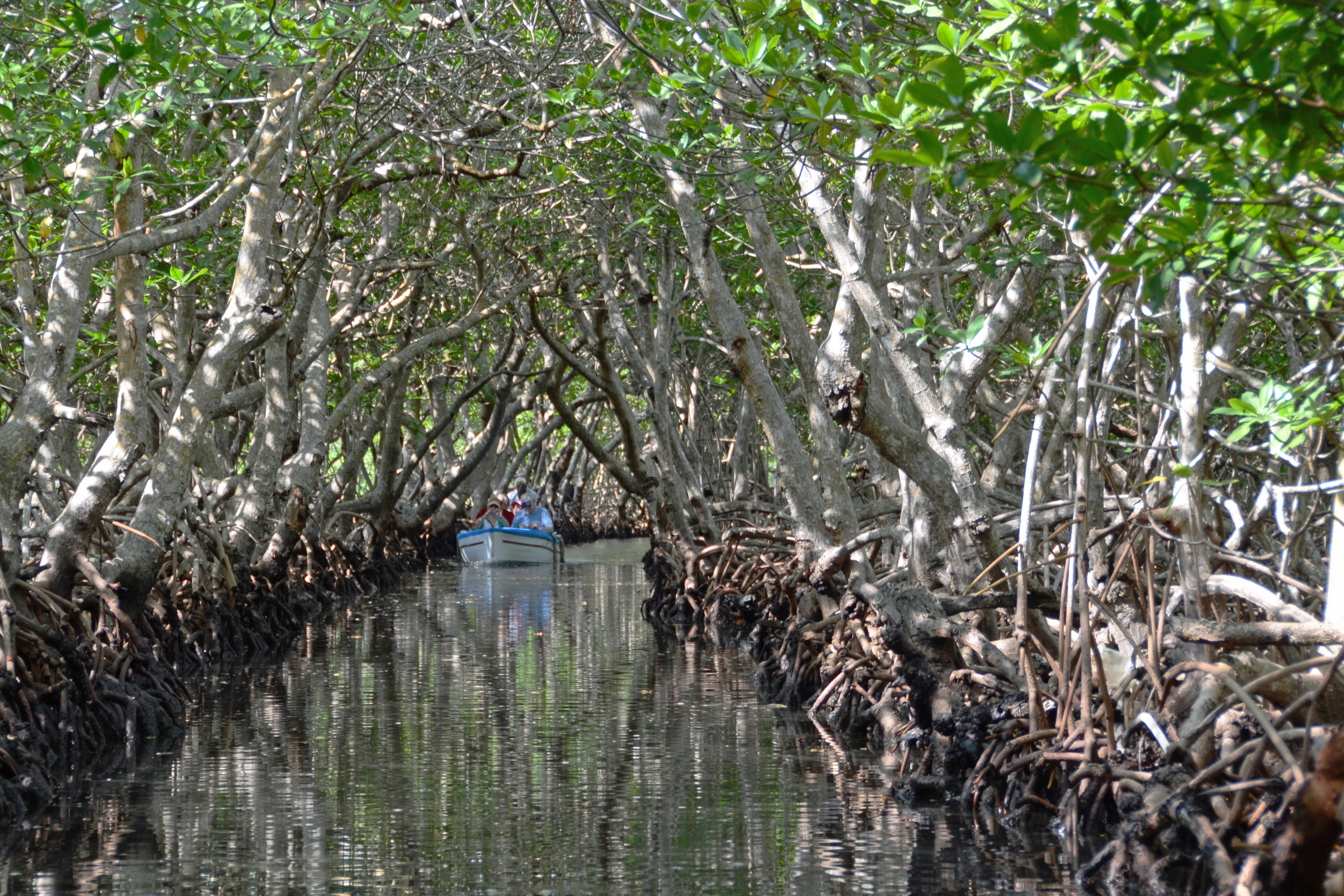
- Mangroves in Roatán, Honduras.

Ecology
- Biome: Mangroves

Geography
- Area: 1,036 km^{2} (400 sq mi)
- Countries: Honduras; Guatemala

Conservation
- Conservation status: Vulnerable

The Northern Honduras mangroves form an ecoregion in the mangroves biome, as defined by the World Wildlife Fund. This ecoregion stretches along most of the Caribbean coast of Honduras, up to the east of Amatique Bay in Guatemala. It covers an area of 1036 km^{2}. The ecoregion is threatened by the expansion of agriculture and livestock production.
