= Pico Pijol National Park =

National park in Honduras

- IUCN category II (national park)
- Location within Honduras
- Location: Honduras
- Coordinates: 15°11′50″N 87°34′59″W
- Area: 122.1 km^{2} (47.1 sq mi)
- Established: 1 January 1987

Pico Pijol National Park is a national park in Honduras. It was established on 1 January 1987 and covers an area of 122.1 square kilometres. It has an altitude of between 1,800 and 2,282 metres.
