= Mosquitia–Nicaraguan Caribbean Coast mangroves =

Mangrove ecoregion in Central America

Mosquitia-Nicaraguan Caribbean Coast mangroves
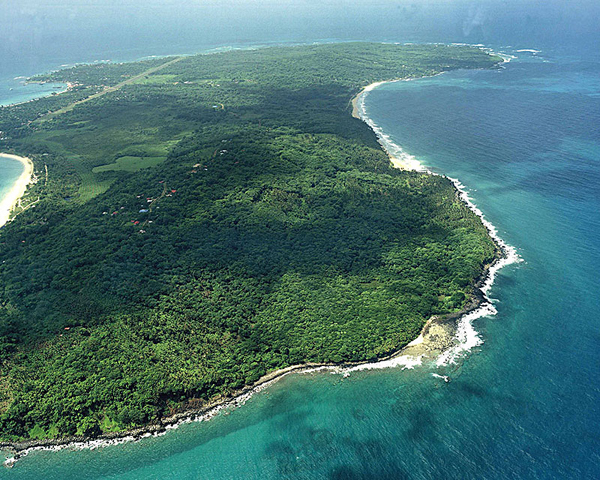
- Big Corn Island, 70 km east of Nicaragua coast

Ecology
- Biome: Mangroves

Geography
- Area: 4,400 km^{2} (1,700 sq mi)
- Countries: Honduras; Nicaragua

Conservation
- Conservation status: Relatively Stable/Intact

The Mosquitia-Nicaraguan Caribbean Coast mangroves ecoregion, in the Mangrove biome, are along the Caribbean coasts of Nicaragua and Honduras as well as off shore islands such as the Corn Islands.

== Description ==
The Mosquitia-Nicaraguan Caribbean Coast mangroves community includes a diverse number of mangrove species: red mangrove (Rhizophora mangle), black mangrove (Avicennia germinans), white mangrove (Laguncularia racemosa), buttonwood (Conocarpus erectus), and another species of red mangrove (Rhizophora harrisonii) as well as the occasional rare occurrences of piñuelo mangrove (Pelliciera rhizophorae).
