= Jeannette Kawas National Park =

National park in Honduras

- IUCN category II (national park)
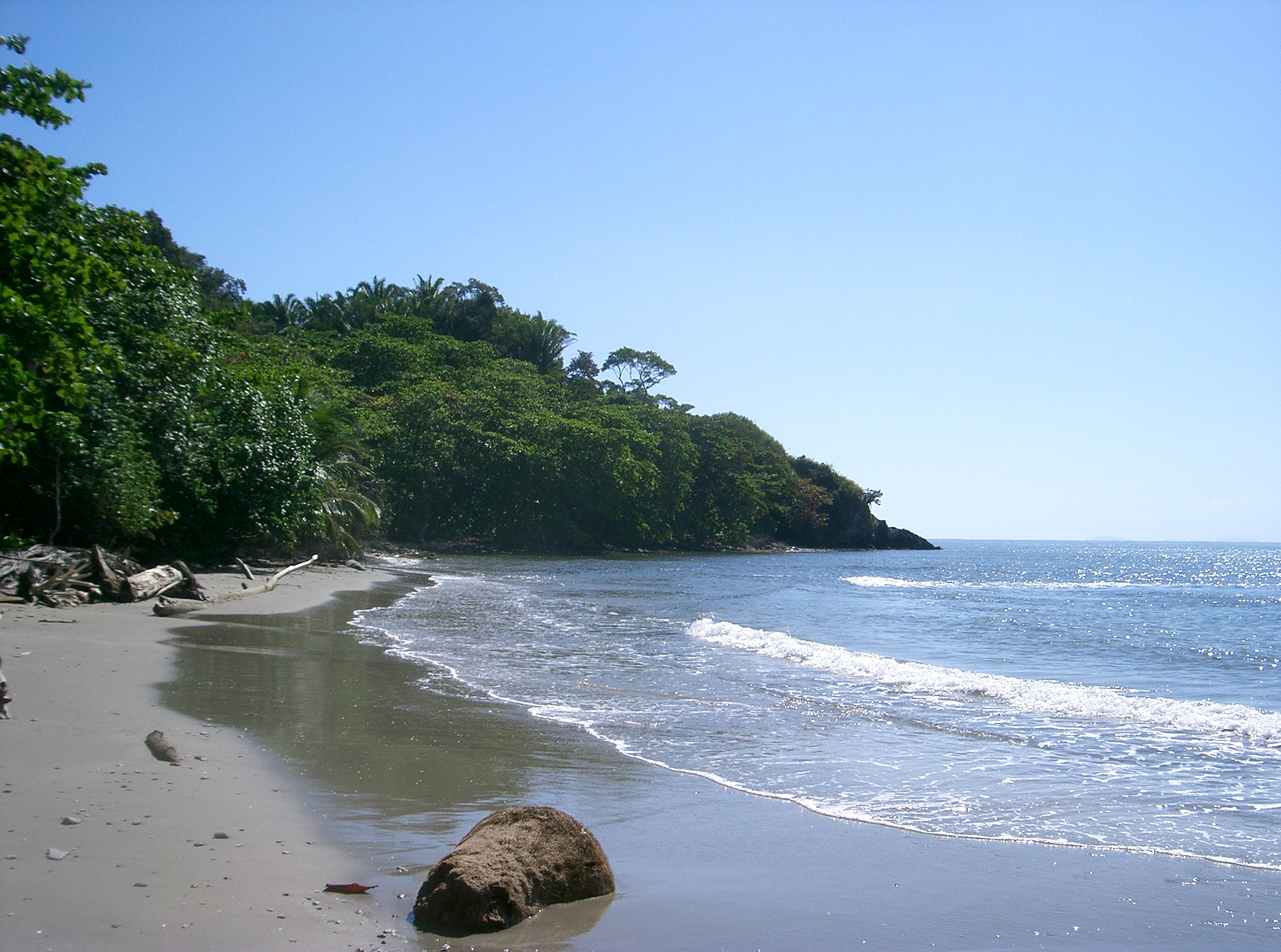
- Punta Sal peninsula beach near entrance to the Sendero Los Curumos

- Location within Honduras
- Location: Honduras
- Coordinates: 15°49′06″N 87°22′03″W
- Area: 781.62 km^{2} (301.79 sq mi)
- Established: 4 November 1994

Ramsar Wetland
- Official name: Parque Nacional Jeannette Kawas
- Designated: 28 March 1995
- Reference no.: 722

Jeannette Kawas National Park (Spanish: Parque Nacional Jeannette Kawas) is a national park located in the municipality of Tela, on the northern Caribbean coast of the Atlántida department of Honduras, established on 4 November 1994. The park covers an area of 781.62 square kilometres and has an altitude of 900 metres. The park was created and is managed by the PROLANSATE foundation (protection of Lancetilla, Punta Sal and Texiguat).

== History ==
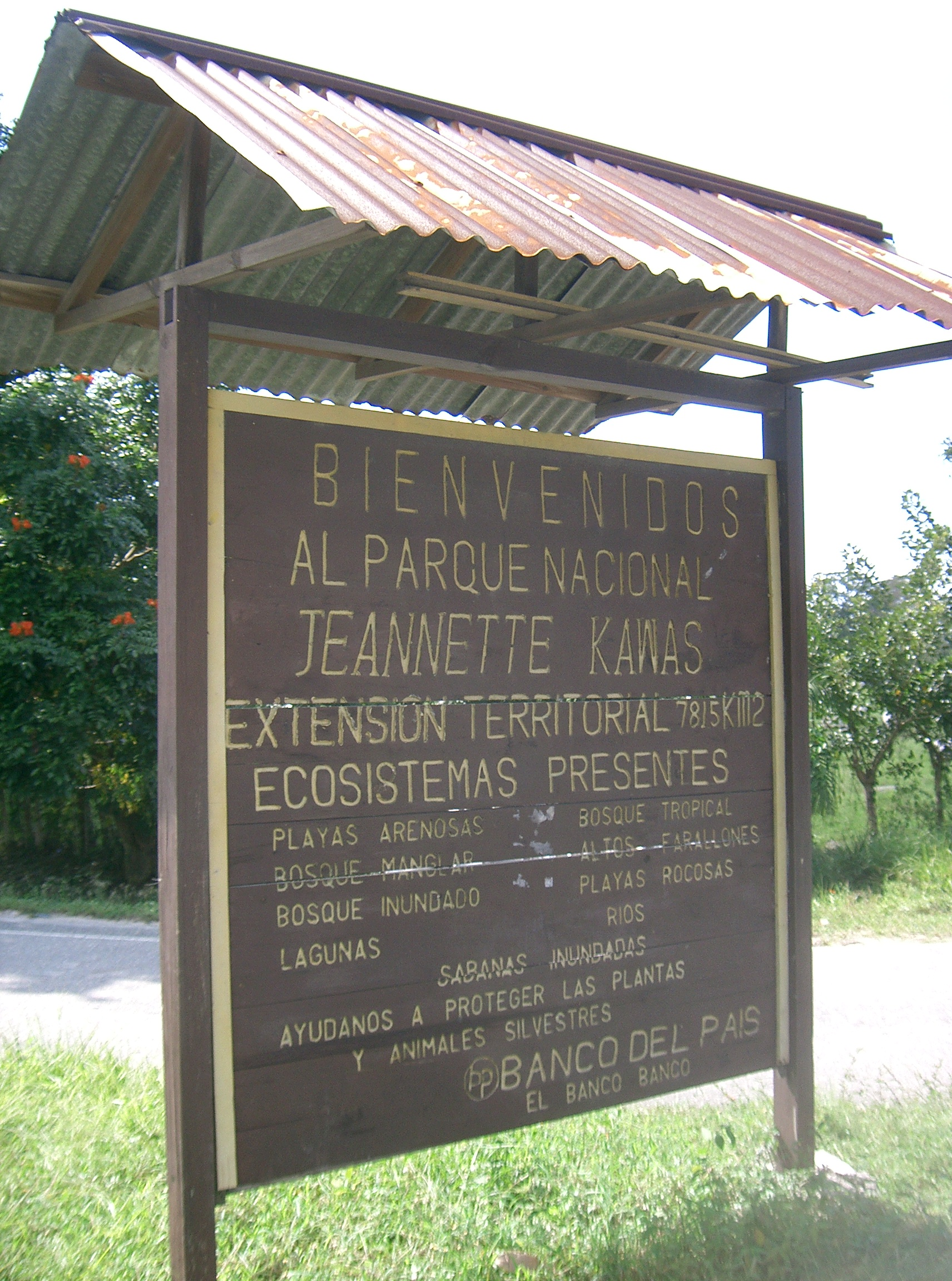
Sign welcoming visitors to Parque Nacional Jeannette Kawas

The park was established on 4 November 1994, originally named Punta Sal National Park. It was created and is managed by the PROLANSATE foundation (protection of Lancetilla, Punta Sal and Texiguat).

Its name was changed to Jeannette Kawas National Park in honor of Jeannette Kawas, an environmental activist and PROLANSATE president who was murdered on February 6, 1995, for her work trying to keep the palm plantations out of the park.

Jeannette Kawas National Park is part of the Ramsar Convention List of Wetlands of International Importance and was designated as such on March 28, 1995.

== Geography ==
The park is located in the municipality of Tela, on the northern Caribbean coast of the Atlántida department of Honduras. Located at 15º51'N 087º40'W between longitudes 87º29' and 87º52' west and latitudes 15º42' and 16º00'. It covers an area of 781.62 square kilometres and has an altitude of 900 metres.

== Ecosystems ==
The park is made up of varied marine, terrestrial and wetlands ecosystems with a large number of species. These ecosystems include beaches, tropical forests, inundated forests, mangrove forests, lagoons and rivers.

== Species ==
=== Birds ===
- Keel-billed motmot
- Turquoise-browed motmot
- Green-breasted mountain-gem
- Lovely cotinga
- Resplendent quetzal
- Bushy-crested jay
- Blue-crowned chlorophonia
- Lesser ground-cuckoo

=== Mammals ===
As of 2026, it is thought the park supports a jaguar population of 10-18 individuals.

- West Indian manatee
- Common dolphin
- White-headed capuchin
- Howler monkey

=== Fishes ===
- Tarpon
- Centropomus
- Gafftopsail catfish

=== Reptiles ===
- American crocodile
- Sea turtle, such as green sea turtle, leatherback sea turtle, hawksbill turtle and the loggerhead turtle
- Green iguana
- Red-tailed boa
- Mexican burrowing snake

=== Arthropods ===
- Caribbean hermit crab
- Golden silk orb-weaver

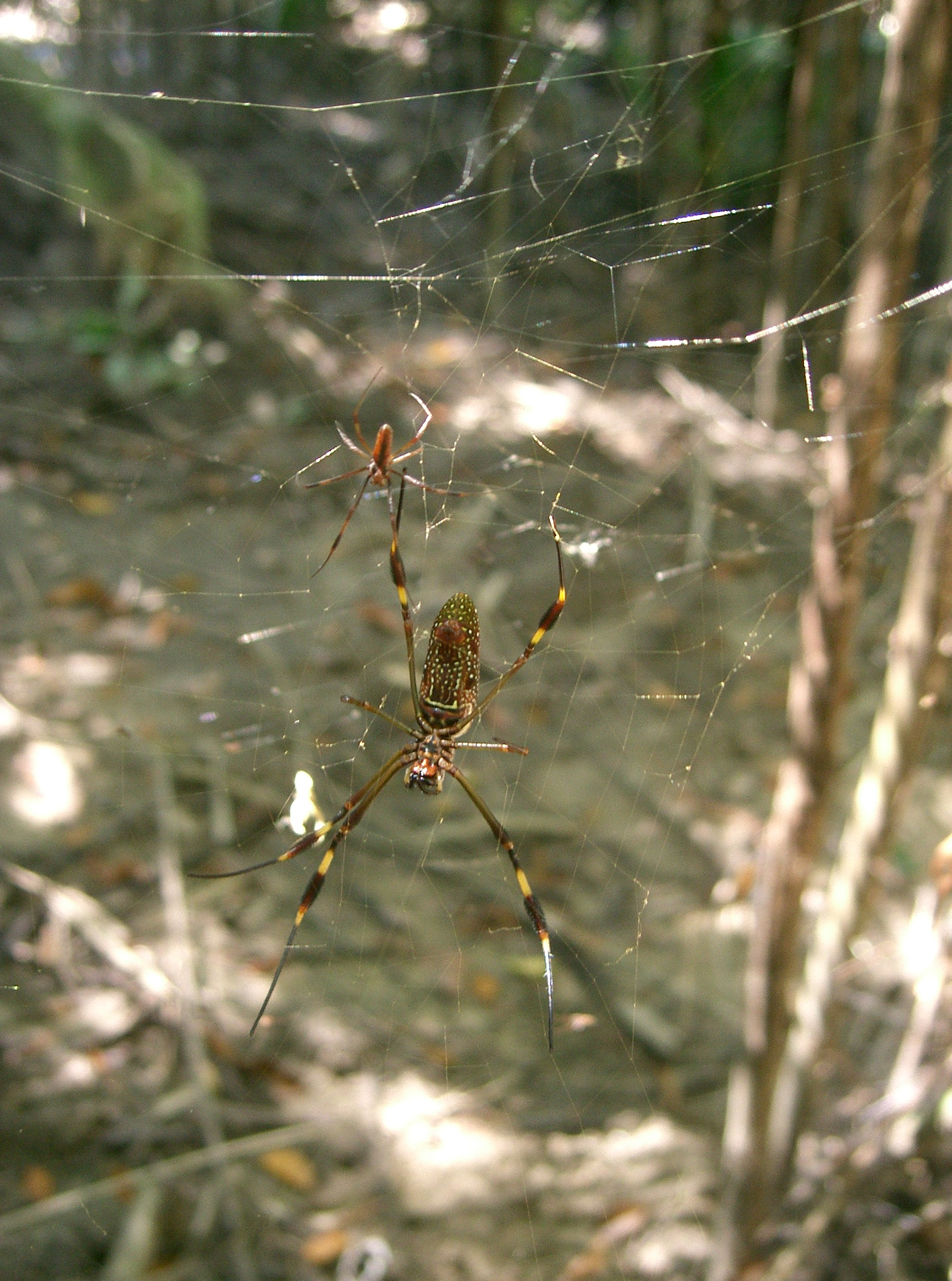
Golden silk spider from the Punta Sal peninsula

=== Plants ===
- Acalypha skutchii
- Cappatis truerchkhemii
- Columnea tuerckheimii
- Cordia truncatifolia
- Ormosia macrocalyx
- Phyllanthus elsiae
- Rinorea hummelii
- Salacia impressifolia
- Sida antillensis
- Sida troyana

== See also ==
- La Tigra National park, Honduras first national park
