= Capiro Calentura National Park =

National park in Honduras

- IUCN category II (national park)
- Location within Honduras
- Location: Colón Department, Honduras
- Nearest city: Trujillo
- Coordinates: 15°52′38″N 85°56′06″W
- Area: 80.82 km^{2} (31.20 sq mi)
- Established: 1992

Capiro Calentura National Park is a national park in Honduras. It was established in 1992 and covers an area of 81 square kilometres.
