= Patuca National Park =

National park in Honduras

- IUCN category II (national park)
- Location within Honduras
- Location: Honduras
- Coordinates: 14°25′55″N 85°26′47″W
- Area: 3,755.84 km^{2} (1,450.14 sq mi)
- Established: 1 January 1999

Patuca National Park is a national park in Honduras. It was established on 1 January 1999 and covers an area of 3755.84 square kilometres.
