= Punta Izopo National Park =

National park in Honduras

- IUCN category II (national park)
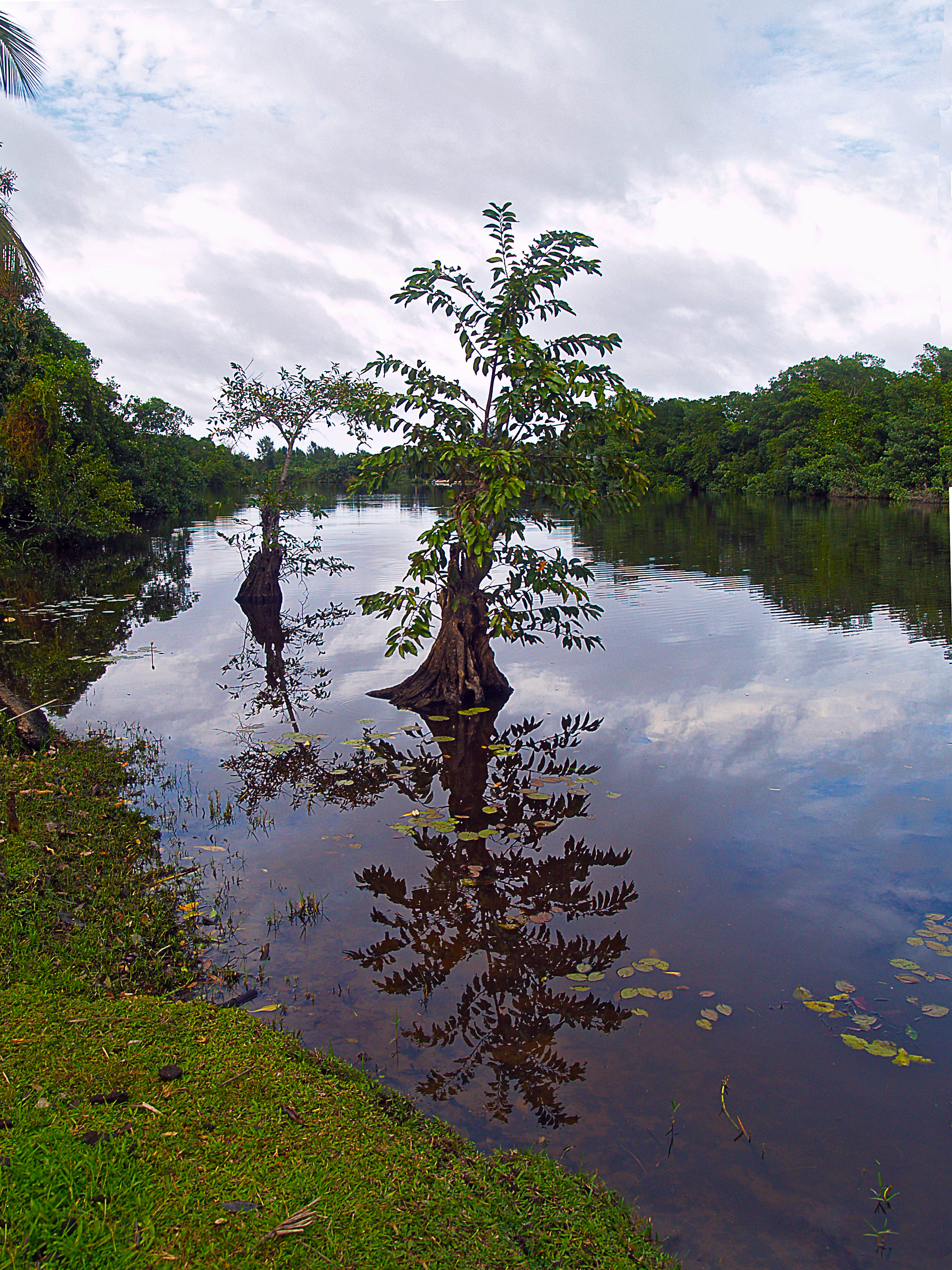
- Interactive map of Punta Izopo National Park
- Location: Northern Honduras
- Nearest city: Tela
- Coordinates: 15°48′51″N 87°22′59″W
- Area: 112 km^{2} (43 sq mi)
- Established: 1 January 1992

Ramsar Wetland
- Official name: Refugio de Vida Silvestre Punta Izopo
- Designated: 20 March 1996
- Reference no.: 812

Punta Izopo National Park (Spanish: Parque Nacional Punta Izopo) is a national park located in the municipality of Tela, on the northern Caribbean coast of the Atlántida department of Honduras. It has an altitude of 118 metres.
