= Cerro Azul de Copán National Park =

National park in Honduras

- IUCN category II (national park)
- Location within Honduras
- Location: Honduras
- Coordinates: 15°07′42″N 88°54′37″W
- Area: 154.6 km^{2} (59.7 sq mi)
- Established: 1 January 1987

Cerro Azul de Copán National Park is a national park in Honduras. It was established on 1 January 1987 and covers an area of 154.6 square kilometres. It has an altitude of between 1,800 and 2,285 metres.
