= Cusuco National Park =

National park in Honduras

- IUCN category II (national park)
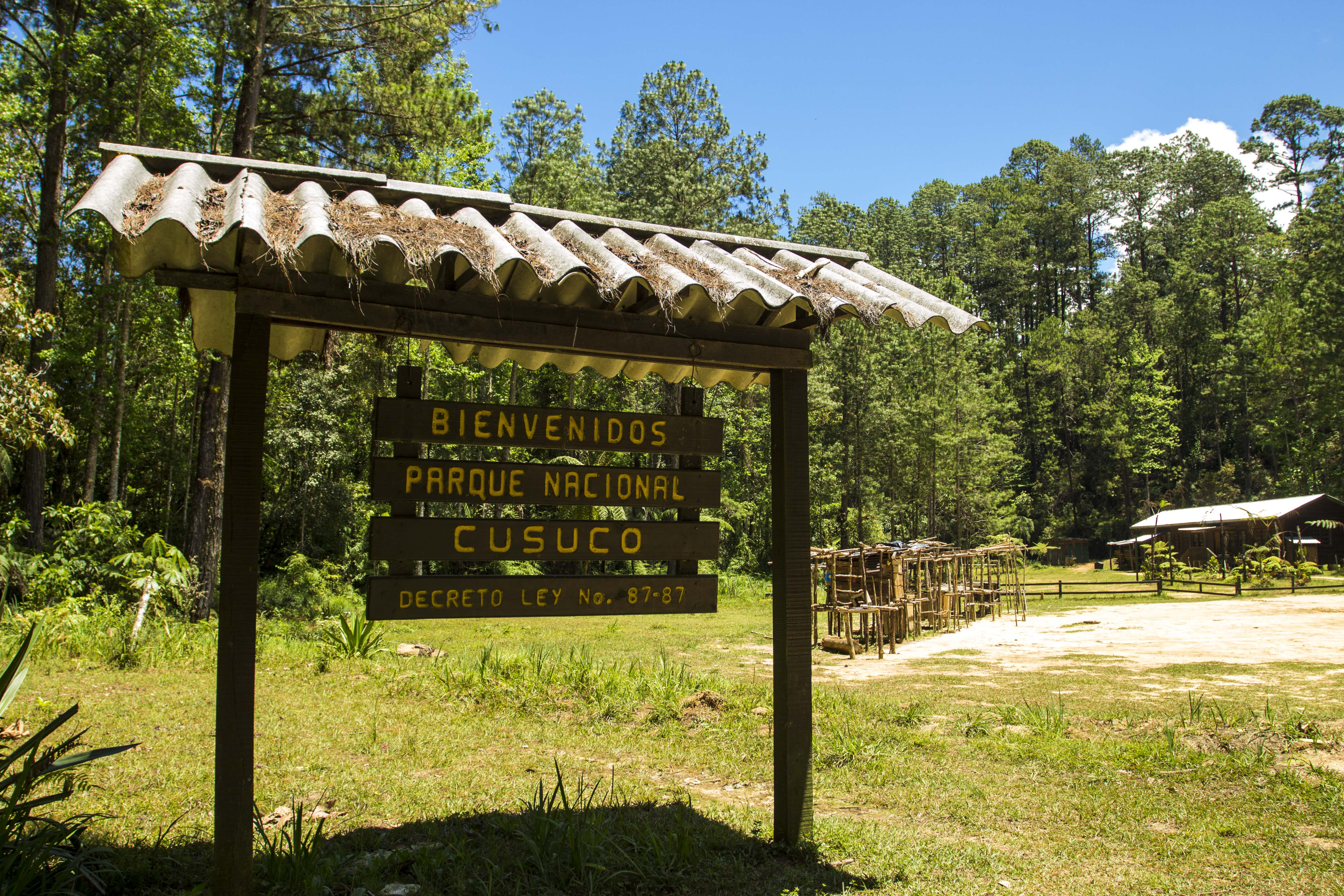
- Sign welcoming visitors to Cusuco National Park

- Location within Honduras
- Location: Honduras
- Coordinates: 15°32′31″N 88°15′49″W
- Area: 234.4 km^{2} (90.5 sq mi)
- Established: 1 January 1959; 67 years ago

Cusuco National Park is a national park in Honduras. It was established on 1 January 1959 and covers an area of 234.4 square kilometres (90.5 sq mi).

Cusuco National Park is a 23,400 hectares (58,000 acres) protected area in the Merendon mountains of northwest Honduras. The park ranges from just above sea level in the west to 2,425 metres (7,956 ft) in the middle. The park comprises a 7,690 hectares (19,000 acres) core zone surrounded by a 15,750 hectares (38,900 acres) buffer zone. Cusuco encompasses several major habitats, including semi-arid pine forest, moist pine forest, moist broadleaf forest and dwarf forest (bosque enano) at elevations above 2,000 metres (6,600 ft).

The park is part of the Meso-American biodiversity hotspot (Conservation International 2006), a region characterised by exceptional species richness. Cusuco also has great diversity of habitats and high beta diversity in many groups due to the large elevational gradients in the park. Cusuco supports exceptional biodiversity. Some of the key features of the park include the globally threatened taxa which the park protects - especially amphibians (table 1), Baird's tapir, the assemblage of montane forest specialist birds, jewel scarab beetles, and the globally rare bosque enano (dwarf forest) habitat, which is characterised by Randia brachysiphon. Cusuco is recognised as a Key Biodiversity Area (KBA) due to the overlapping ranges of several globally threatened amphibian species. The integrity of the ecosystem is threatened by land cover change and unsustainable land management practices – particularly conversion of forest to coffee plantations - by human population growth and infrastructure intensification, overexploitation of large mammals, the amphibian disease chytridiomycosis, and climate change.

There is a visitors' center at 15.496111°N 88.211667°W.
