= Port Royal National Park =

Proposed national park in Honduras

- IUCN category II (national park)
- Location within Honduras
- Location: Honduras
- Coordinates: 16°23′59″N 86°22′00″W
- Area: 5 km^{2} (1.9 sq mi)
- Established: 2010

Port Royal National Park is a national park on the island of Roatán in Honduras. It covers an area of 5 km^{2} along the south shore of the island's eastern end.
