= Montaña de Yoro National Park =

National park in Honduras

Montañade Yoro National Park
- IUCN category II (national park)
- Location within Honduras
- Location: Honduras
- Coordinates: 15°00′17″N 87°04′20″W
- Area: 154.8 km^{2} (59.8 sq mi)
- Established: 1 January 1987

Montañade Yoro National Park (previously named Montaña de Yoro National Park) is a national park in Honduras. It was established on 1 January 1987 and covers an area of 154.8 square kilometres. It has an altitude of between 1,800 and 2,245 metres.
