= Cerro Azul Meámbar National Park =

National park in Honduras

- IUCN category II (national park)
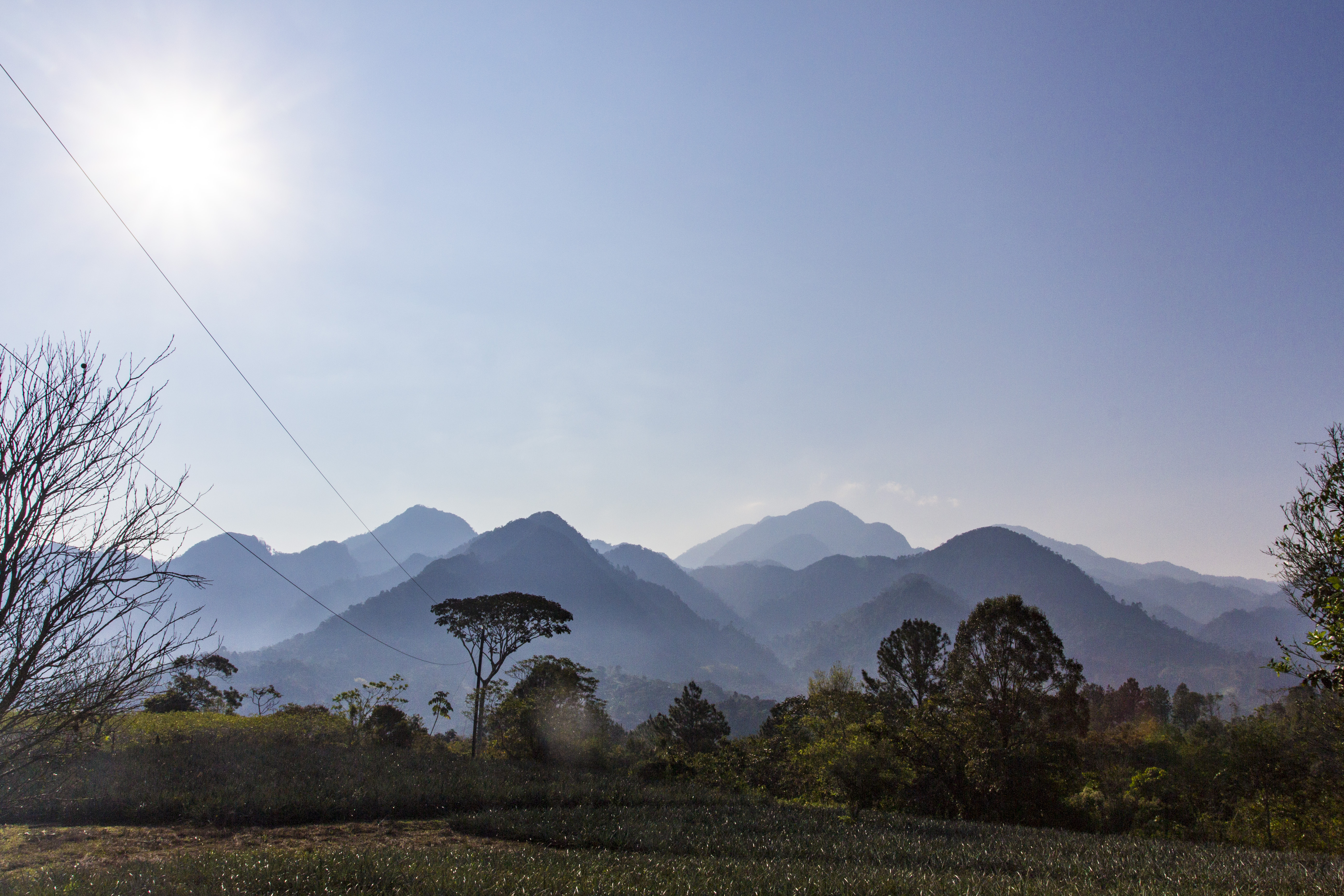
- Cerro Azul Meámbar National Park, February 2017

- Location within Honduras
- Location: Honduras
- Coordinates: 14°50′15″N 87°53′43″W
- Area: 300 km^{2} (120 sq mi)
- Established: 1 January 1987

Cerro Azul Meámbar National Park (Spanish: Parque Nacional Cerro Azul Meámbar), also known as PANACAM, is a national park in Honduras. It was established on 1 January 1987 and covers an area of 300 square kilometres. It has an altitude of between 1,800 and 2,047 metres.
