= List of ecoregions in Belize =

This is a list of ecoregions in Belize as defined by the World Wildlife Fund and the Freshwater Ecoregions of the World database.

== Terrestrial ecoregions ==
=== Tropical and subtropical moist broadleaf forests ===
- Petén–Veracruz moist forests
- Yucatán moist forests

=== Tropical and subtropical coniferous forests ===
- Belizian pine forests

=== Mangroves ===
- Belizean Coast mangroves
- Belizean Reef mangroves
- Mayan Corridor mangroves

== Freshwater ecoregions ==
=== Tropical and subtropical coastal rivers ===
- Quintana Roo - Motagua

== Marine ecoregions ==
=== Tropical Northwestern Atlantic ===
- Western Caribbean (includes the Mesoamerican Barrier Reef)

== See also ==
- List of ecoregions in Guatemala
- List of ecoregions in Mexico
