= List of ecoregions in Mexico =

Mexican ecoregions according to the WWF

Terrestrial ecoregions of Mexico

The following is a list of ecoregions in Mexico as identified by the World Wide Fund for Nature (WWF). A different system of ecoregional analysis is used by the Commission for Environmental Cooperation, a trilateral body linking Mexican, Canadian and United States environmental regime.

== Terrestrial ecoregions ==
The terrestrial ecoregions of Mexico span two biogeographic realms - the Nearctic and Neotropic - which together constitute the entire biogeography of the Americas.

Veracruz is the most biodiverse state with 10 ecoregions across 5 biomes and 2 realms. Chiapas comes in a close second with 10 ecoregions across 4 biomes in the same realm. By contrast, Morelos is the least biodiverse state with just 2 ecoregions.

| Realm | Biome | Ecoregion | State |
|---|---|---|---|
| Nearctic | Deserts and xeric shrublands | Baja California desert | Baja California, Baja California Sur |
| Nearctic | Deserts and xeric shrublands | Central Mexican matorral | Aguascalientes, Guanajuato, Hidalgo, Jalisco, Mexico, Mexico City, Michoacán, Querétaro, Zacatecas |
| Nearctic | Deserts and xeric shrublands | Chihuahuan Desert | Chihuahua, Coahuila, Durango, Nuevo León, Sonora, Zacatecas |
| Nearctic | Deserts and xeric shrublands | Gulf of California xeric scrub | Baja California, Baja California Sur |
| Nearctic | Deserts and xeric shrublands | Meseta Central matorral | Coahuila, Durango, Hidalgo, Nuevo León, Querétaro, San Luis Potosí, Tamaulipas, Zacatecas |
| Nearctic | Deserts and xeric shrublands | Sonoran Desert | Baja California, Sinaloa, Sonora |
| Nearctic | Deserts and xeric shrublands | Tamaulipan matorral | Nuevo León, Tamaulipas |
| Nearctic | Deserts and xeric shrublands | Tamaulipan mezquital | Coahuila, Nuevo León, Tamaulipas |
| Nearctic | Mangroves | Northern Mesoamerican Pacific Coast Mangroves | Baja California Sur, Sinaloa, Sonora |
| Nearctic | Mediterranean forests, woodlands, and scrub | California coastal sage and chaparral | Baja California |
| Nearctic | Temperate coniferous forests | Sierra Juárez and San Pedro Mártir pine–oak forests | Baja California |
| Nearctic | Temperate broadleaf and mixed forests | Sierra Madre Occidental pine–oak forests | Chihuahua, Durango, Jalisco, Sonora, Zacatecas |
| Nearctic | Temperate broadleaf and mixed forests | Sierra Madre Oriental pine–oak forests | Chihuahua, Coahuila, Durango, Hidalgo, Nuevo León, Puebla, Querétaro, San Luis Potosí, Tamaulipas, Veracruz, Zacatecas |
| Nearctic | Tropical and subtropical dry broadleaf forests | Sonoran–Sinaloan transition subtropical dry forest | Sinaloa, Sonora |
| Nearctic | Tropical and subtropical grasslands, savannas, and shrublands | Tamaulipan pastizal | Tamaulipas |
| Neotropical | Deserts and xeric shrublands | San Lucan xeric scrub | Baja California Sur |
| Neotropical | Deserts and xeric shrublands | Tehuacán Valley matorral | Oaxaca, Puebla, Tlaxcala |
| Neotropical | Flooded grasslands and savannas | Central Mexican wetlands | Mexico, Michoacán, Guanajuato, Mexico City |
| Neotropical | Mangroves | Alvarado mangroves | Tamaulipas, Veracruz |
| Neotropical | Mangroves | Belizean Coast mangroves | Quintana Roo |
| Neotropical | Mangroves | Marismas Nacionales–San Blas mangroves | Nayarit, Sinaloa |
| Neotropical | Mangroves | Mayan Corridor mangroves | Quintana Roo |
| Neotropical | Mangroves | Mexican South Pacific Coast mangroves | Guerrero, Michoacán, Oaxaca |
| Neotropical | Mangroves | Petenes mangroves | Campeche, Yucatán |
| Neotropical | Mangroves | Ría Lagartos mangroves | Yucatán |
| Neotropical | Mangroves | Tehuantepec–El Manchón mangroves | Chiapas |
| Neotropical | Mangroves | Usumacinta mangroves | Tabasco |
| Neotropical | Montane grasslands and shrublands | Zacatonal | Hidalgo, Mexico, Morelos |
| Neotropical | Tropical and subtropical coniferous forests | Central American pine–oak forests | Chiapas |
| Neotropical | Tropical and subtropical coniferous forests | Sierra de la Laguna pine–oak forests | Baja California Sur |
| Neotropical | Tropical and subtropical coniferous forests | Sierra Madre de Oaxaca pine–oak forests | Oaxaca, Puebla, Veracruz |
| Neotropical | Tropical and subtropical coniferous forests | Sierra Madre del Sur pine–oak forests | Guerrero, Jalisco, Michoacán, Oaxaca, Puebla |
| Neotropical | Tropical and subtropical coniferous forests | Trans-Mexican Volcanic Belt pine–oak forests | Aguascalientes, Colima, Guanajuato, Guerrero, Hidalgo, Jalisco, Mexico, Mexico City, Michoacán, Morelos, Nayarit, Puebla, Querétaro, San Luis Potosí, Tlaxcala, Veracruz, Zacatecas |
| Neotropical | Tropical and subtropical dry broadleaf forests | Bajío dry forests | Guanajuato, Jalisco, Michoacán |
| Neotropical | Tropical and subtropical dry broadleaf forests | Balsas dry forests | Guerrero, Mexico, Michoacán, Morelos, Oaxaca and Puebla |
| Neotropical | Tropical and subtropical dry broadleaf forests | Central American dry forests | Chiapas |
| Neotropical | Tropical and subtropical dry broadleaf forests | Chiapas Depression dry forests | Chiapas |
| Neotropical | Tropical and subtropical dry broadleaf forests | Jalisco dry forests | Colima, Jalisco, Michoacán, Nayarit |
| Neotropical | Tropical and subtropical dry broadleaf forests | Revillagigedo Islands dry forests | Colima |
| Neotropical | Tropical and subtropical dry broadleaf forests | Sierra de la Laguna dry forests | Baja California Sur |
| Neotropical | Tropical and subtropical dry broadleaf forests | Sinaloan dry forests | Chihuahua, Jalisco, Nayarit, Sinaloa, Sonora |
| Neotropical | Tropical and subtropical dry broadleaf forests | Southern Pacific dry forests | Chiapas, Guerrero, Oaxaca |
| Neotropical | Tropical and subtropical dry broadleaf forests | Veracruz dry forests | Veracruz |
| Neotropical | Tropical and subtropical dry broadleaf forests | Yucatán dry forests | Campeche, Quintana Roo, Yucatán |
| Neotropical | Tropical and subtropical moist broadleaf forests | Chiapas montane forests | Chiapas |
| Neotropical | Tropical and subtropical moist broadleaf forests | Chimalapas montane forests | Chiapas, Oaxaca |
| Neotropical | Tropical and subtropical moist broadleaf forests | Oaxacan montane forests | Oaxaca, Puebla, Veracruz |
| Neotropical | Tropical and subtropical moist broadleaf forests | Pantanos de Centla | Campeche, Chiapas, Tabasco |
| Neotropical | Tropical and subtropical moist broadleaf forests | Petén–Veracruz moist forests | Campeche, Chiapas, Oaxaca, Puebla, Quintana Roo, Tabasco, Veracruz |
| Neotropical | Tropical and subtropical moist broadleaf forests | Sierra de los Tuxtlas | Veracruz |
| Neotropical | Tropical and subtropical moist broadleaf forests | Sierra Madre de Chiapas moist forests | Chiapas |
| Neotropical | Tropical and subtropical moist broadleaf forests | Veracruz moist forests | Hidalgo, Puebla, San Luis Potosí, Tamaulipas, Veracruz |
| Neotropical | Tropical and subtropical moist broadleaf forests | Veracruz montane forests | Hidalgo, Puebla, Veracruz |
| Neotropical | Tropical and subtropical moist broadleaf forests | Yucatán moist forests | Campeche, Quintana Roo, Yucatán |

== Freshwater ecoregions ==
=== Baja California Complex ===
- Baja California

=== Colorado River Complex ===
- Colorado Delta
- Sonoran

=== Sinaloan Coastal Complex ===
- Sinaloan Coastal

=== Rio Bravo Complex ===
- Rio Bravo
- Pecos
- Guzman
- Mapimí
- Cuatro Ciénegas
- Llanos El Salado
- Conchos
- Lower Rio Bravo
- Rio San Juan
- Rio Salado

=== Lerma/Santiago Complex ===
- Santiago
- Chapala
- Lerma
- Rio Verde Headwaters
- Manantlan/Ameca

=== Rio Panuco Complex ===
- Rio Panuco

=== Balsas Complex ===
- Balsas

=== Pacific Central Complex ===
- Tehuantepec

=== Atlantic Central Complex ===
- Southern Veracruz
- Belizean Lowlands
- Catemaco
- Coatzacoalcos
- Grijalva-Usumacinta
- Yucatán

== Marine ecoregions ==
=== Warm Temperate Northeast Pacific ===
- Southern California Bight
- Cortezian
- Magdalena Transition

=== Tropical East Pacific ===
- Revillagigedos
- Mexican Tropical Pacific
- [Clipperton] (an overseas possession of France, disputed by Mexico)
- Chiapas-Nicaragua

=== Warm Temperate Northwest Atlantic ===
- Northern Gulf of Mexico

=== Tropical Northwestern Atlantic ===
- Southern Gulf of Mexico
- Western Caribbean

== See also ==
- List of ecoregions in the United States (WWF)
- List of ecoregions in Guatemala
- List of ecoregions in Belize
