= List of ecoregions in El Salvador =

This is a list of ecoregions in El Salvador as defined by the World Wildlife Fund and the Freshwater Ecoregions of the World database.

== Terrestrial ecoregions ==
=== Tropical and subtropical moist broadleaf forests ===
- Central American montane forests

=== Tropical and subtropical dry broadleaf forests ===
- Central American dry forests

=== Tropical and subtropical coniferous forests ===
- Central American pine-oak forests

=== Mangroves ===
- Gulf of Fonseca mangroves
- Northern Dry Pacific Coast mangroves

== Freshwater ecoregions ==
=== Tropical and subtropical coastal rivers ===
- Chiapas - Fonseca

== Marine ecoregions ==
=== Tropical East Pacific ===
- Chiapas-Nicaragua

== See also ==
- List of ecoregions in Guatemala
- List of ecoregions in Nicaragua
