= List of ecoregions in Guatemala =

This is a list of ecoregions of Guatemala as defined by the World Wildlife Fund and the Freshwater Ecoregions of the World database.

== Terrestrial ecoregions ==
=== Tropical and subtropical moist broadleaf forests ===
- Central American Atlantic moist forests
- Central American montane forests
- Chiapas montane forests
- Petén–Veracruz moist forests
- Sierra Madre de Chiapas moist forests
- Yucatán moist forests

=== Tropical and subtropical dry broadleaf forests ===
- Central American dry forests
- Chiapas Depression dry forests

=== Tropical and subtropical coniferous forests ===
- Central American pine-oak forests

=== Deserts and xeric shrublands ===
- Motagua Valley thornscrub

=== Mangroves ===
- Belizean Coast mangroves
- Northern Honduras mangroves
- Northern Dry Pacific Coast mangroves

== Freshwater ecoregions ==
=== Tropical and subtropical coastal rivers ===
- Grijalva - Usumacinta
- Quintana Roo - Motagua
- Chiapas - Fonseca

=== Tropical and subtropical upland rivers ===
- Upper Usumacinta

== Marine ecoregions ==
=== Tropical Northwestern Atlantic ===
- Western Caribbean (includes the Mesoamerican Barrier Reef)

=== Tropical East Pacific ===
- Chiapas-Nicaragua

== See also ==
- List of ecoregions in Belize
- List of ecoregions in El Salvador
- List of ecoregions in Mexico
