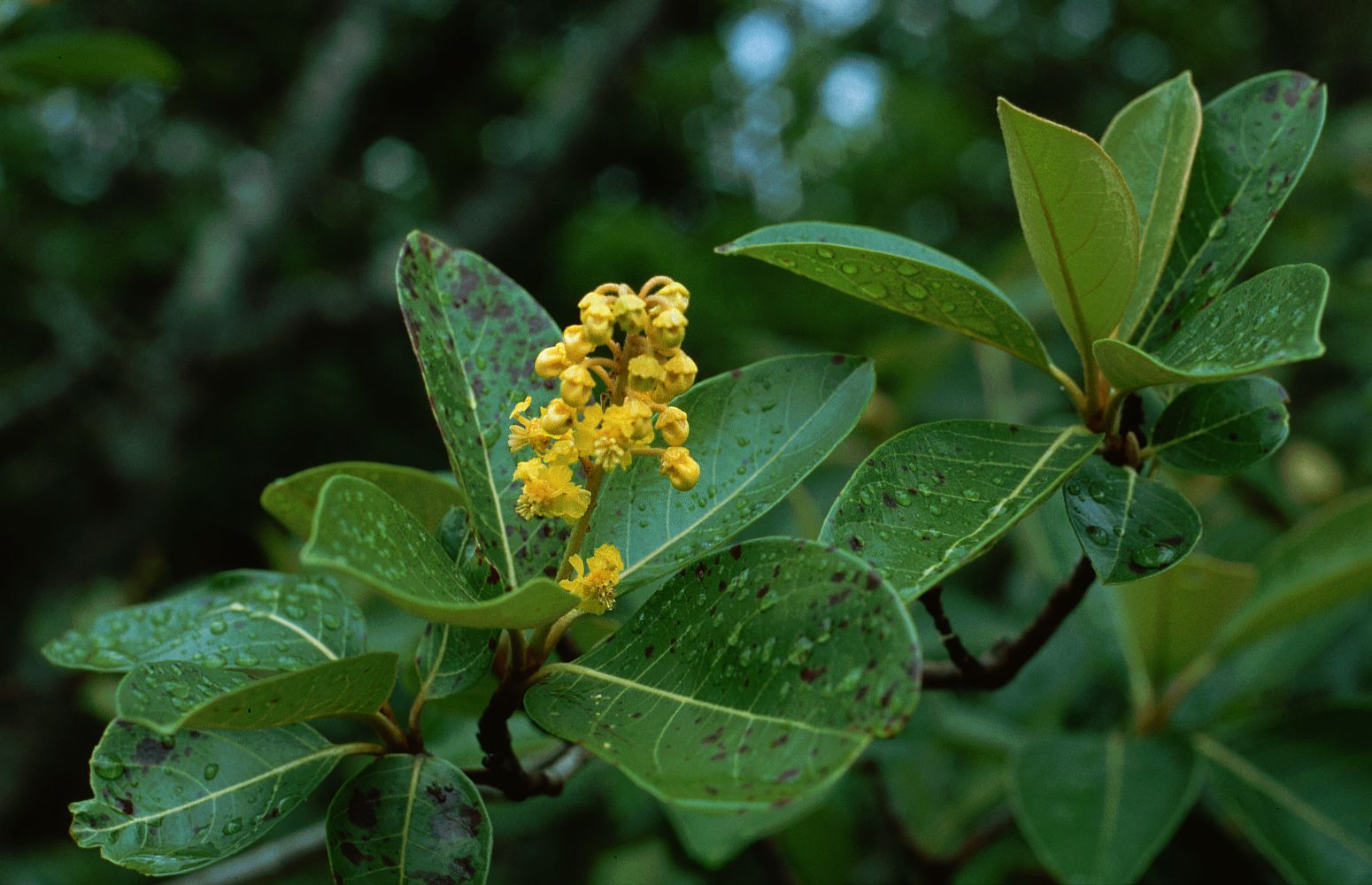
- In Costa Rica

Conservation status
- Least Concern (IUCN 3.1)

Scientific classification
- Kingdom: Plantae
- Clade: Embryophytes
- Clade: Tracheophytes
- Clade: Spermatophytes
- Clade: Angiosperms
- Clade: Eudicots
- Clade: Rosids
- Order: Malpighiales
- Family: Malpighiaceae
- Genus: Byrsonima
- Species: B. crassifolia

Binomial name
- Byrsonima crassifolia (L.) Kunth

Synonyms
- Malpighia crassifolia L.

= Byrsonima crassifolia =

Species of fruit and plant

Nance, frozen, unsweetened
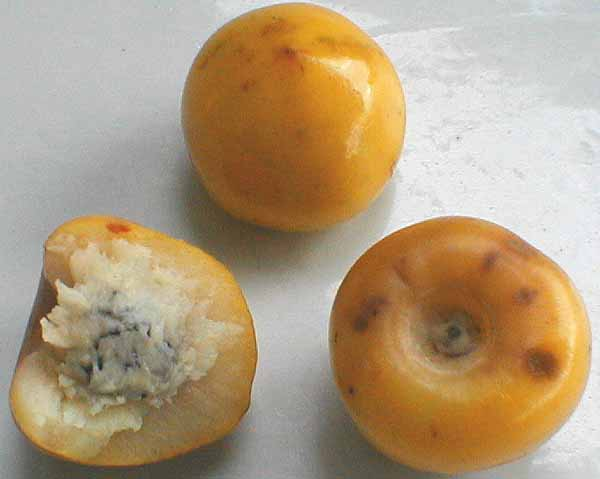
- Fruit

Nutritional value per 100 g (3.5 oz)
- Energy: 306 kJ (73 kcal)
- Carbohydrates: 16.97 g
- Sugars: 8.31 g
- Dietary fiber: 7.5 g
- Fat: 1.16 g
- Protein: 0.66 g
Vitamins and minerals
Vitamins	Quantity %DV^{†}
Vitamin A equiv. lutein zeaxanthin	1% 5 μg 569 μg
Thiamine (B1)	1% 0.015 mg
Riboflavin (B2)	1% 0.018 mg
Niacin (B3)	2% 0.29 mg
Pantothenic acid (B5)	4% 0.18 mg
Vitamin B6	1% 0.021 mg
Folate (B9)	2% 8 μg
Vitamin C	103% 92.5 mg
Vitamin E	8% 1.25 mg
Vitamin K	10% 11.9 μg
Minerals	Quantity %DV^{†}
Calcium	4% 46 mg
Iron	2% 0.38 mg
Magnesium	5% 20 mg
Manganese	11% 0.248 mg
Phosphorus	1% 10 mg
Potassium	8% 244 mg
Sodium	0% 3 mg
Zinc	1% 0.09 mg
- Other constituents: Quantity
- Water: 80.1g
- Link to USDA Database entry
- ^{†}Percentages estimated using US recommendations for adults, except for potassium, which is estimated based on expert recommendation from the National Academies.

Byrsonima crassifolia is a species of flowering plant in the family Malpighiaceae, native to tropical America. Common names used in English include nance, maricao cimun, craboo, and golden spoon. In Jamaica it is called hogberry.

The plant is valued for its small (between one, and one and a quarter centimeter in diameter) round, sweet yellow fruit, which is strongly scented. The fruits have a very pungent and distinct flavor and smell. When jarred, their texture resembles that of a green or kalamata olive.

== Description and habitat ==
Byrsonima crassifolia is a slow-growing large shrub or tree to 10 metres (33 ft). Sometimes cultivated for its edible fruits, the tree is native and abundant in the wild, sometimes in extensive stands, in open pine forests and grassy savannas, from central Mexico, through Central America, to Colombia, Peru, Bolivia and Brazil; it also occurs in Trinidad, Barbados, Curaçao, St. Martin, Dominica, Guadeloupe, Puerto Rico, Haiti, the Dominican Republic and throughout Cuba and the Isle of Pines. The nance is limited to tropical and subtropical climates. In Central and South America, the tree ranges from sea-level to an altitude of 1,800 m (6,000 ft). It is highly drought-tolerant.

== Regions of occurrence ==
B. crassifolia is found in a number of tropical and subtropical ecoregions of the Americas that feature conifers. One such ecoregion is the Belizean pine forests.

== Uses ==
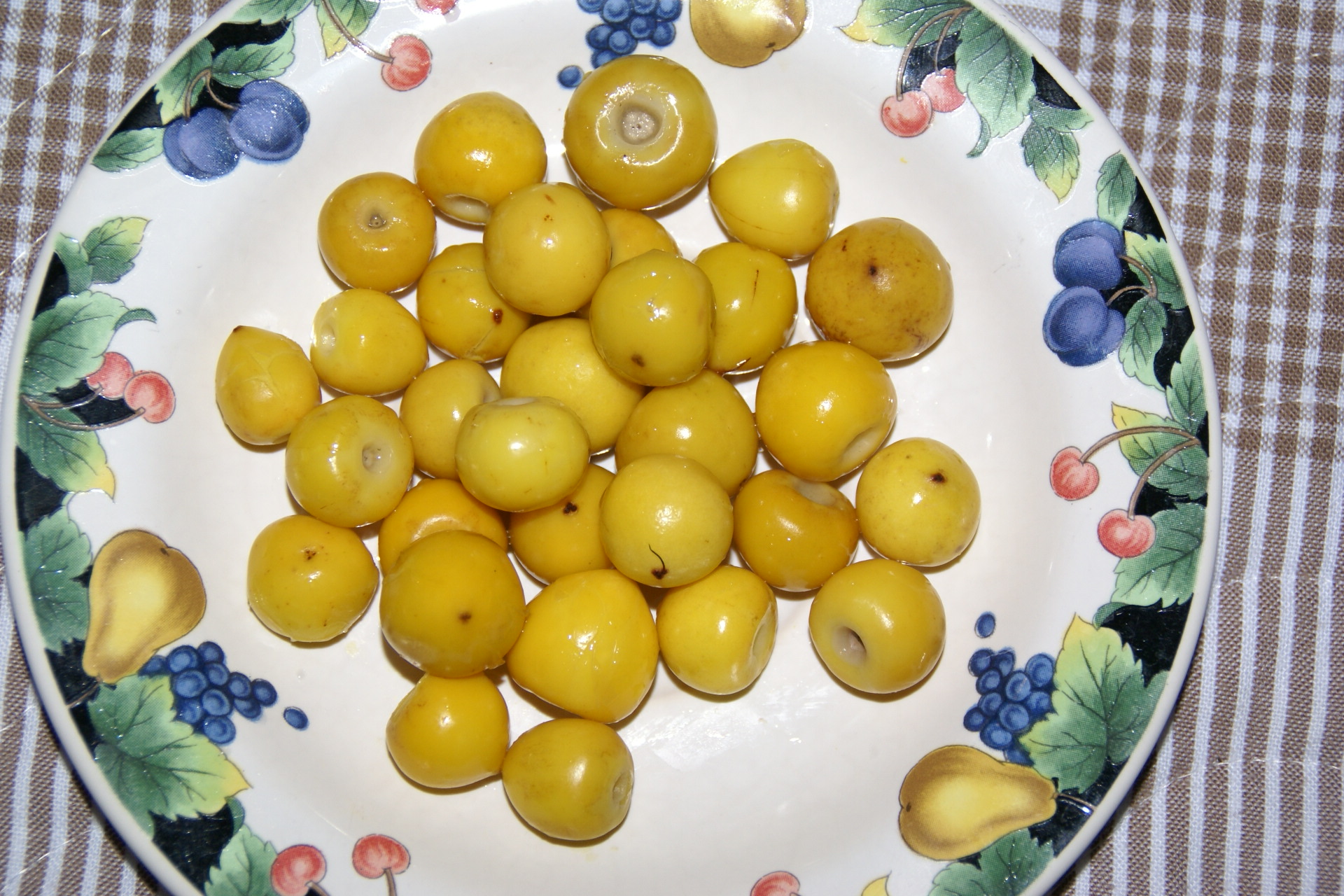
Nance from Guatemala City, Guatemala

The fruits are eaten raw or cooked as dessert. In rural Panama, the dessert prepared with the addition of sugar and flour, known as pesada de nance, is quite popular. The fruits are also made into dulce de nance, a candy prepared with the fruit cooked in sugar and water. In Nicaragua (where the fruit is called nancite), it is a popular ingredient for several desserts, including raspados (a frozen dessert made from a drink prepared with nancites) and a dessert made by leaving the fruit to ferment with some sugar in a bottle for several months (usually from harvest around August–September until December); this is sometimes called "nancite in vinegar".

The fruits are also often used to prepare carbonated beverages, ice cream and juice; in Brazil, to flavor mezcal-based liqueurs, or make an oily, acidic, fermented beverage known as chicha, the standard term applied to assorted beer-like drinks made of fruits or maize. Nance is used to distill a rum-like liquor called crema de nance in Costa Rica. Mexico produces a licor de nanche.

In Veracruz, Mexico, it is called nanche and it is a common dessert element that can be found in the form of popsicles (percheronas) and ice sorbets (raspado). Fruit components can be processed to make traditional and innovative food products, namely candies, cookies, cakes, candied fruits, ice creams, sorbets, jellies, juices, liqueurs, jams, nectars, pickles, and fruit drinks

In Panama, the wood from the tree is used as an aromatic in smoking and grilling.

== Gallery ==
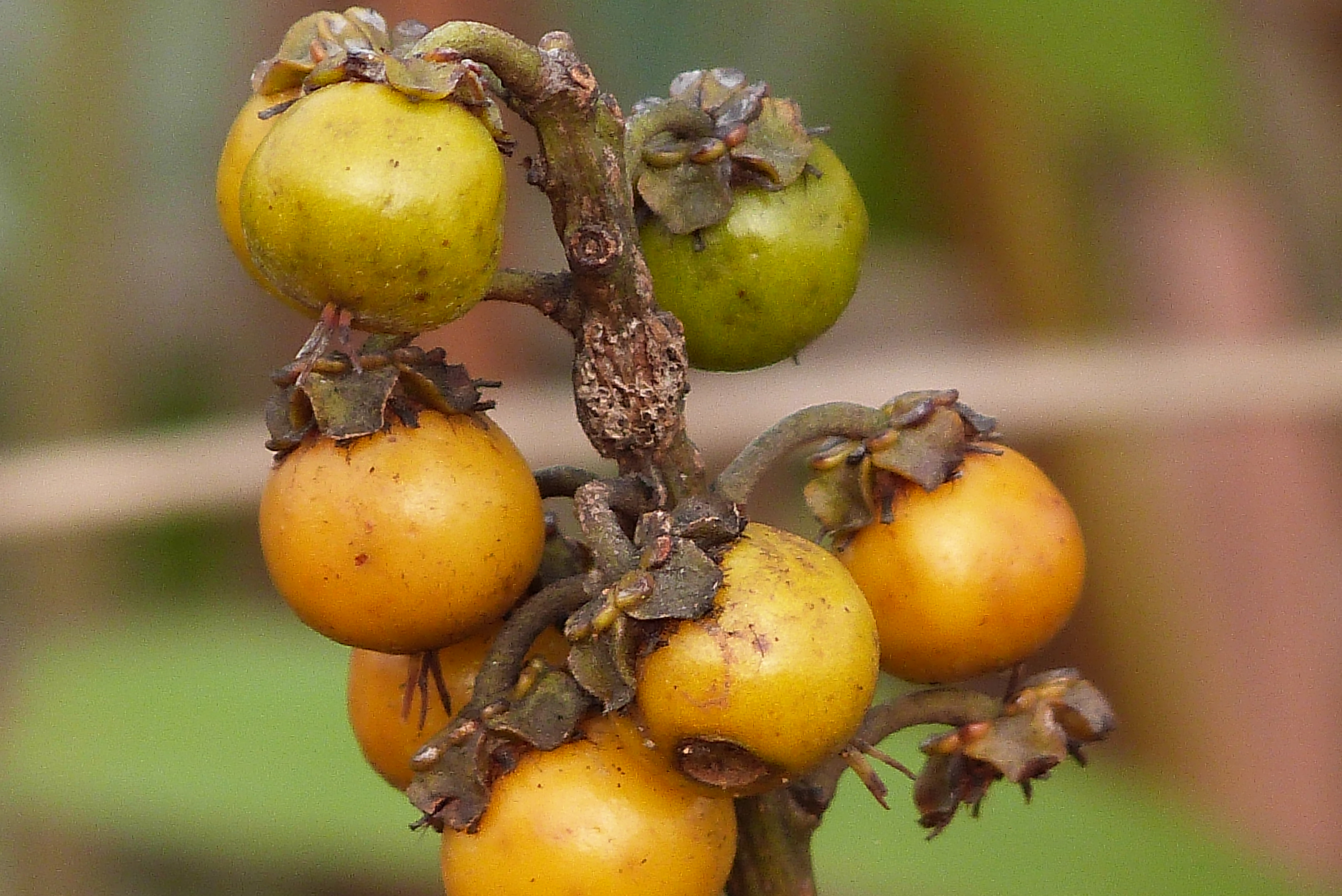
Fruit

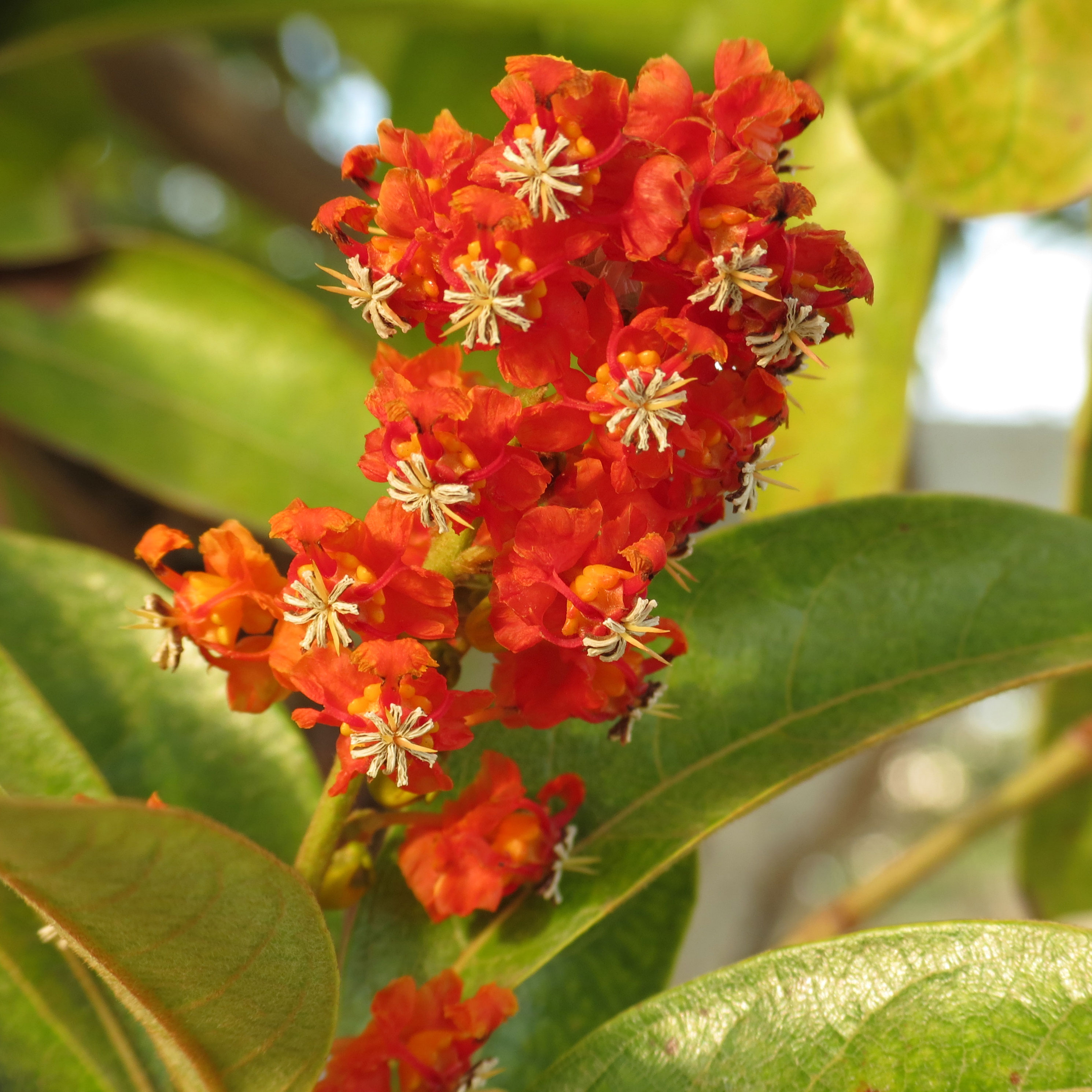
Flowers

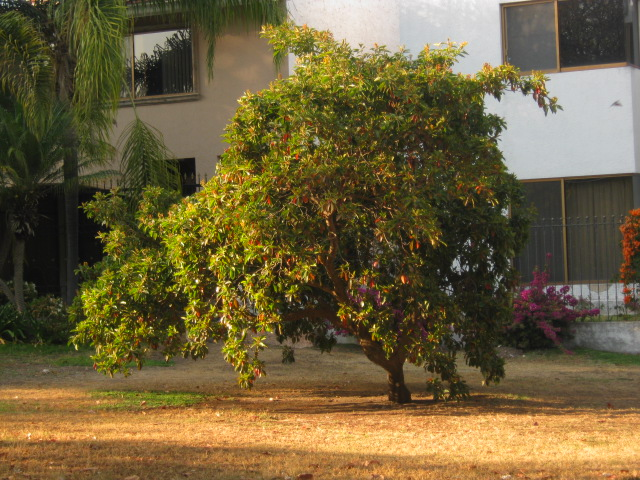
Tree

== See also ==
- List of plants of Cerrado vegetation of Brazil
- List of culinary fruits
