= El Paredón =

El Paredón may refer to:

- El Paredón, Panama, a town in Coclé Province, Panama
- El Paredón, Guatemala, a coastal village in Escuintla Department, Guatemala
