= Sierra Madre de Chiapas moist forests =

Ecoregion in Mexico and Guatemala

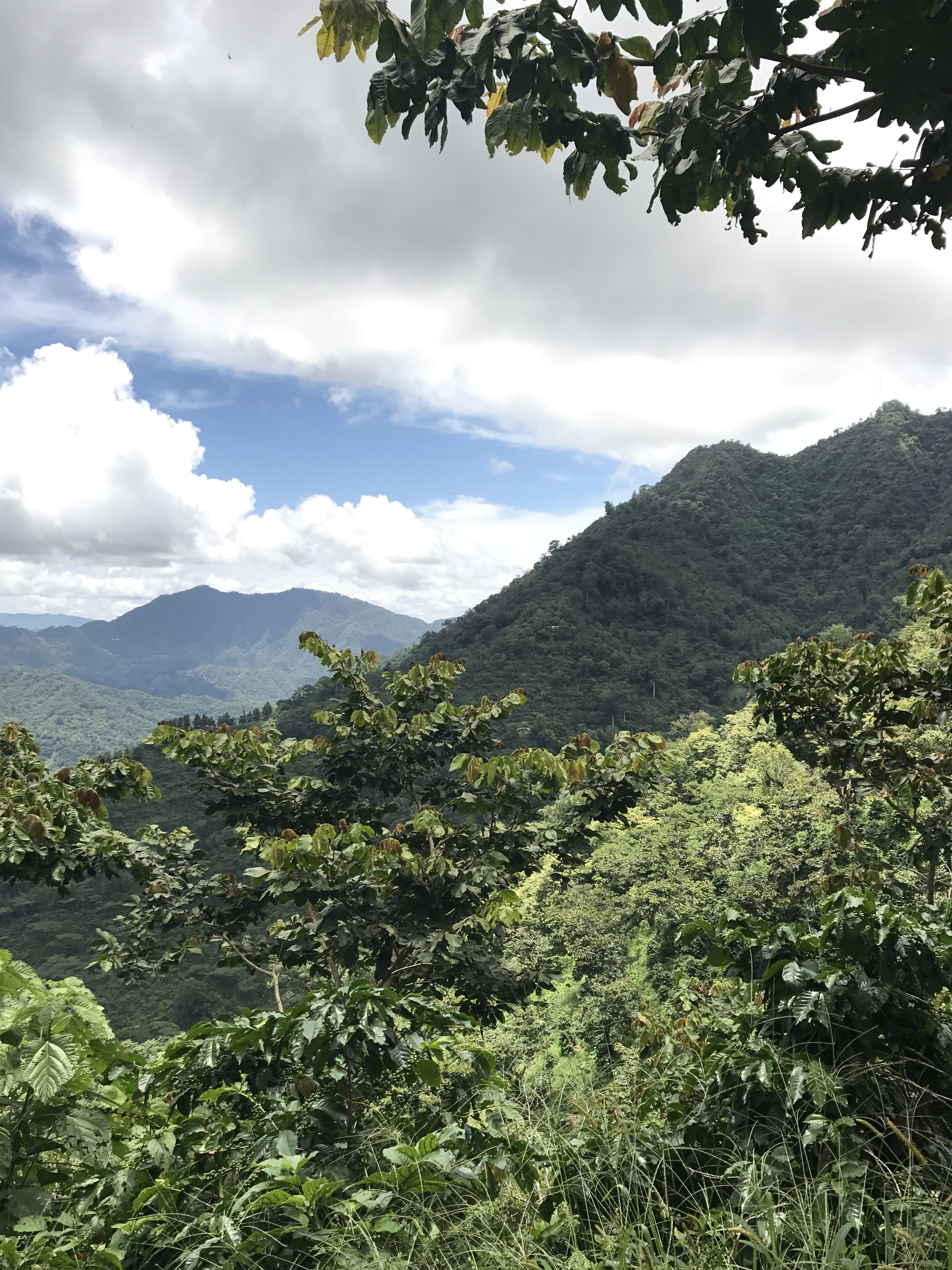
- Forest in El Triunfo Biosphere Reserve, Chiapas

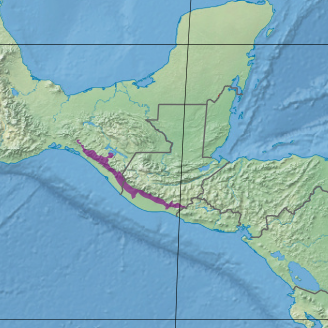
- Ecoregion territory (in purple)

Ecology
- Realm: Neotropical
- Biome: tropical and subtropical moist broadleaf forests
- Borders: Central American dry forests; Central American pine-oak forests; Southern Pacific dry forests

Geography
- Area: 11,218 km^{2} (4,331 sq mi)
- Countries: Mexico; Guatemala, El Salvador
- States of Mexico: Chiapas

Conservation
- Conservation status: Critical/endangered
- Protected: 1,787 km^{2}%

The Sierra Madre de Chiapas moist forests is a tropical moist broadleaf forest ecoregion in southern Mexico and southern Guatemala, extending into the northwestern corner of El Salvador.

== Geography ==
The moist forests ecoregion lies on the southern slope of the Sierra Madre de Chiapas, between the Central American pine–oak forests which cover the mountains' higher elevations to the north, and the Central American dry forests in the Pacific coastal lowlands to the south.

== Climate ==
The climate of the ecoregion is tropical and humid. The mountains intercept prevailing winds from the Pacific, creating clouds, fog, and orographic precipitation. The forests have a cooler and wetter climate than the adjacent lowlands. Average annual temperatures decrease with elevation.

== Flora ==
The main plant communities are montane tropical broadleaf evergreen forest. The forests are of two types, lower montane rain forests and montane rain forests.

Lower montane rain forest is found in a narrow band along the southern slope of the Sierra. In mature forests, trees form a closed canopy 25 to 45 meters high. Typical canopy trees include Alseis yucatanensis, Aspidosperma megalocarpon, Brosimum alicastrum, Calophyllum brasiliense, Dialium guianense, Erblichia odorata, Ficus spp., Guatteria anomala, Licania platypus, Magnolia mexicana, Manilkara zapota, Ocotea rubriflora, Ocotea sinuata, Pleradenophora tuerckheimiana, Poulsenia armata, Protium copal, Quercus oleoides, Quercus skinneri, Swietenia macrophylla, Terminalia amazonia, Trichospermum mexicanum, Ulmus mexicana, Vatairea lundellii, and Vochysia guatemalensis.

The lower montane rain forest has an understory of low trees 10 to 20 meters high. Typical understory tree species include Alchornea latifolia, Alibertia edulis, Blepharidium guatemalense, Bursera simaruba, Casearia laetioides, Cassia grandis, Chrysophyllum mexicanum, Cleidion castaneifolium, Cojoba arborea, Cymbopetalum penduliflorum, Dracaena ghiesbreghtii, Faramea occidentalis, Forchhammeria trifoliata, Guarea glabra subsp. excelsa, Hasseltiopsis dioica, Hirtella racemosa, Lacistema aggregatum, Licaria peckii, Orthion subsessile, Ouratea lucens, Palicourea tomentosa, Piper spp., Pseudolmedia spuria, Quararibea funebris, Crossopetalum parviflorum, Rinorea guatemalensis, Sideroxylon persimile, Simira salvadorensis, Sloanea terniflora, Tabernaemontana donnell-smithii, Trichospermum lessertianum, Trophis racemosa, and Wimmeria bartlettii.

Lianas and epiphytes are abundant, and are found in all the forest layers. The forest floor is dense with low-branched shrubs, spinescent palms, cycads, and lianas.

Montane rain forest is generally found on steep slopes between 900 and 2200 meters elevation. The forest canopy is 25 to 35 meters high, and more open and irregular than that of the lower montane forest. Typical canopy trees include Alfaroa mexicana, Aphananthe monoica, Ardisia verapazensis subsp. verapazensis, Ardisia venosa, Brunellia mexicana, Calatola laevigata, Hedyosmum mexicanum, Hyperbaena mexicana, Lunania mexicana, Matudaea trinervia, Meliosma matudae, Mosquitoxylum jamaicense, Nectandra villosa, Oecopetalum mexicanum, Oreopanax sanderianus, Oreopanax xalapensis, Quercus oocarpa, Quercus peduncularis, Platanus lindeniana, Trichilia erythrocarpa, and Turpinia occidentalis. There is typically an understory layer of trees and shrubs 5 to 15 meters in height. Understory trees and shrubs include Acalypha skutchii, Billia hippocastanum, Centropogon cordifolius, Cephaelis elata, Chamaedorea pinnatifrons, Eugenia ravenii, Hampea longipes, Miconia lauriformis, Mollinedia guatemalensis, Oreopanax liebmanii, Palicourea axillaris, Palicourea elata, Parathesis microcalyx, Psychotria spp, Siparuna thecaphora, Trophis mexicana, and Urera caracasana.

Epiphytes are abundant throughout the montane rain forests, and include mosses, ferns, orchids, bromeliads, and aroids. The forest floor is covered with herbaceous plants.

== Fauna ==
The ecoregion has over 300 species of birds, most notably the resplendent quetzal, horned guan, and the azure-rumped tanager. It is a center of endemism for salamanders and butterflies.

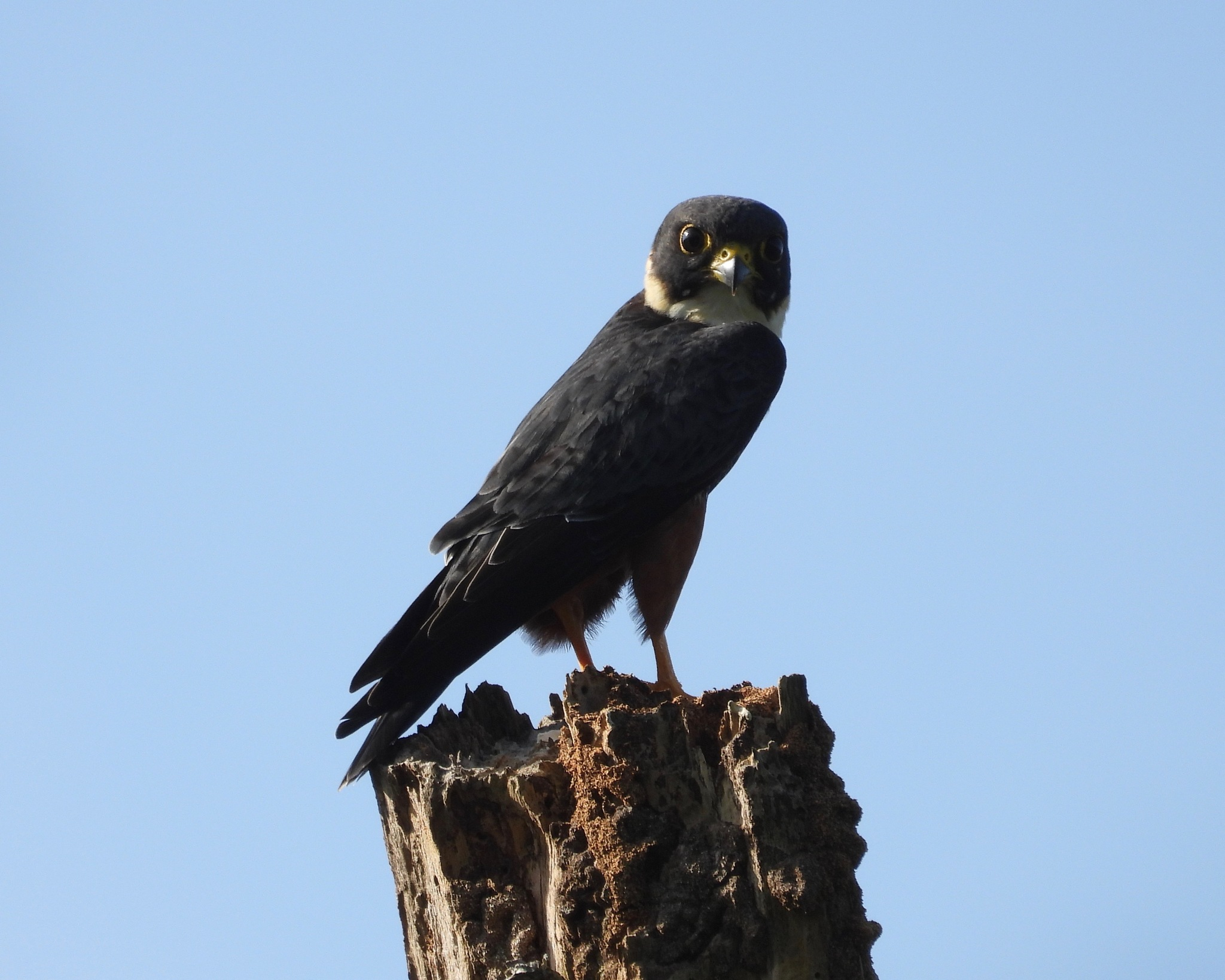
Falco rufigularis in Santa Lucía Cotzumalguapa, Guatemala

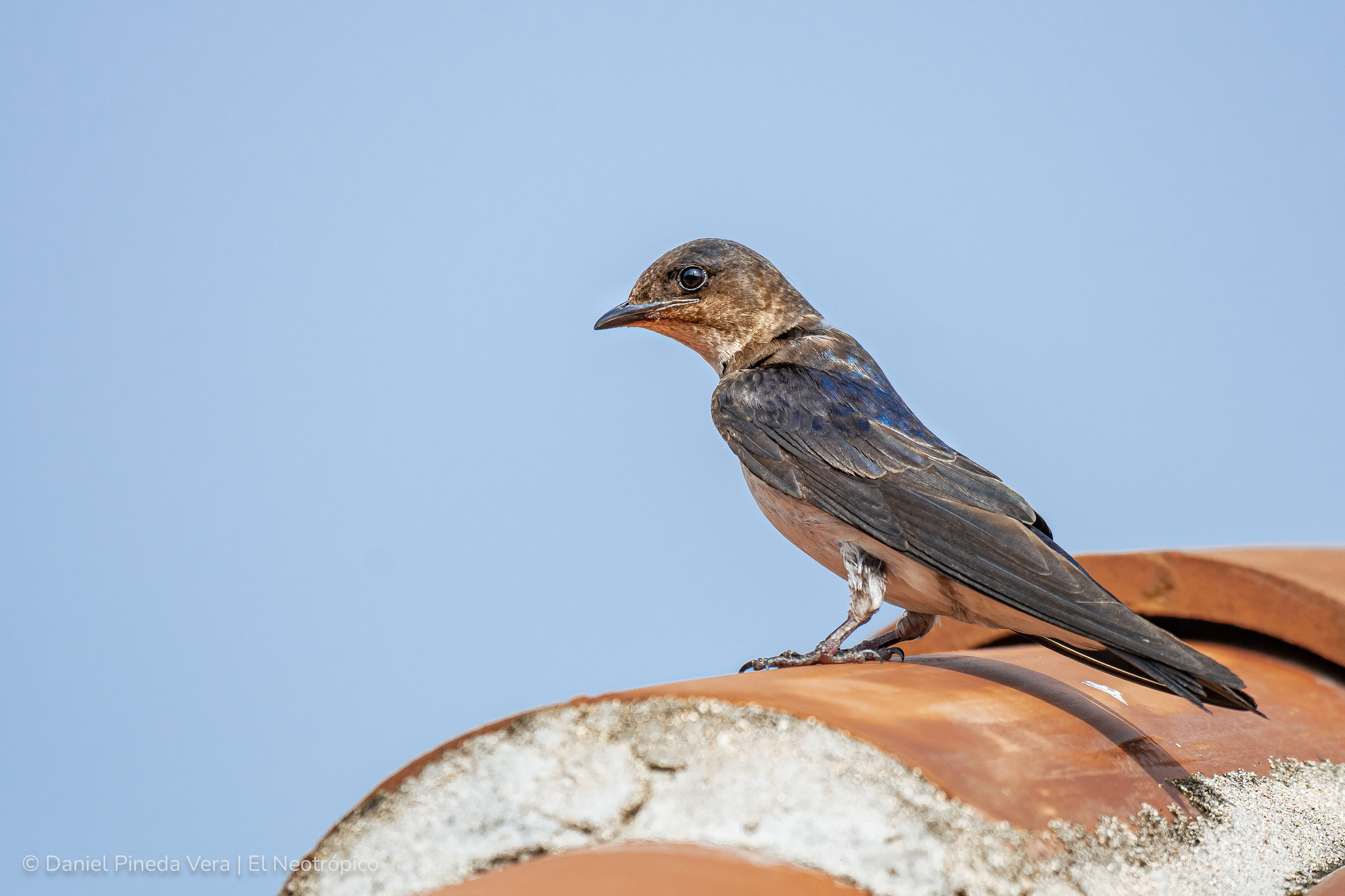
Progne chalybea in Jiquipilas, Mexico

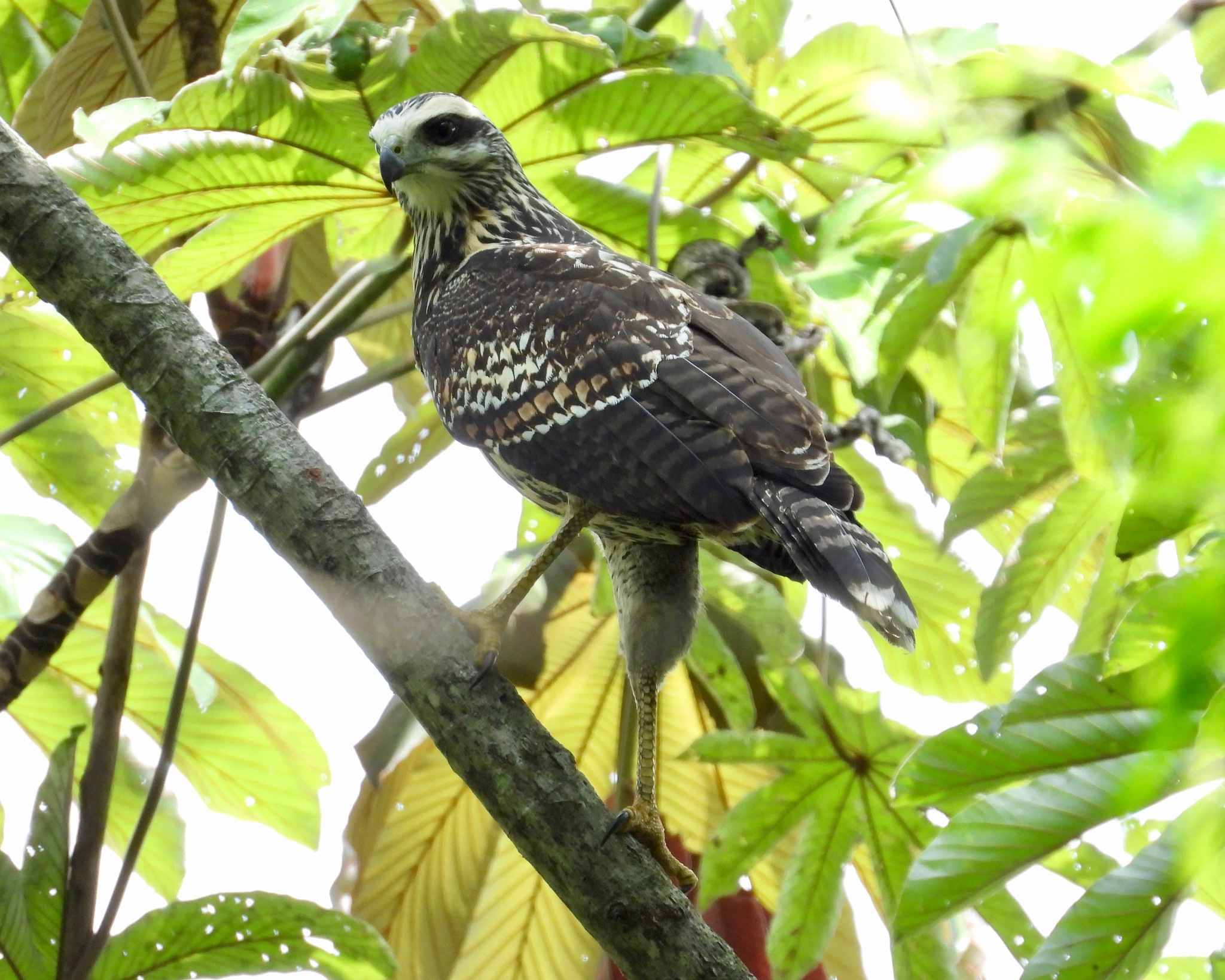
Buteogallus urubitinga in Santa Lucía Cotzumalguapa, Guatemala

== Human impacts ==
Much of the ecoregion's forest has been cleared for agriculture and grazing. The lower montane forests have mostly been cleared for coffee plantations. Much of the remaining forest area is fragmented or degraded, and what remains is often on steep or inaccessible slopes. The ecoregion has a road density of 645 meters per square kilometers, the highest of Central America's ecoregions.

== Protected areas ==
16.55% of the ecoregion is in protected areas. In 2000 7% of the ecoregion's area was protected. Protected areas in Chiapas include the La Sepultura and El Triunfo biosphere reserves, and the Zona de Protección Forestal en los terrenos que se encuentran en los municipios de La Concordia, Angel Albino Corzo, Villa Flores y Jiquipilas Natural Resources Protection Area. Both the Mexican and Guatemalan sides of Volcán Tacaná are protected. Other protected areas in Guatemala include Volcán Moyuta and Volcán Tecuamburro.

== See also ==
- List of ecoregions in El Salvador
- List of ecoregions in Guatemala
- List of ecoregions in Mexico
