= List of ecoregions in Nicaragua =

This is a list of ecoregions in Nicaragua as defined by the World Wildlife Fund and the Freshwater Ecoregions of the World database.

== Terrestrial ecoregions ==
=== Tropical and subtropical moist broadleaf forests ===
- Cayos Miskitos–San Andrés and Providencia moist forests
- Central American Atlantic moist forests
- Central American montane forests
- Costa Rican seasonal moist forests
- Isthmian–Atlantic moist forests

=== Tropical and subtropical dry broadleaf forests ===
- Central American dry forests

=== Tropical and subtropical coniferous forests ===
- Central American pine–oak forests
- Miskito pine forests

=== Mangroves ===
- Gulf of Fonseca mangroves
- Mosquitia–Nicaraguan Caribbean Coast mangroves
- Southern Dry Pacific Coast mangroves
- Rio Negro–Rio San Sun mangroves

=== Tropical and subtropical coastal rivers ===
- Chiapas–Fonseca
- Mosquitia
- Estero Real–Tempisque
- San Juan (Nicaragua/Costa Rica)

== Marine ecoregions ==
=== Tropical Northwestern Atlantic ===
- Southwestern Caribbean

=== Tropical East Pacific ===
- Chiapas–Nicaragua
