= Temperate Northern Pacific =

Biogeographic region of the Earth's seas

A pair of orcas breaching off the southern coast of Unimak Island, Alaska.

The Temperate Northern Pacific is a biogeographic region of the Earth's seas, comprising the temperate waters of the northern Pacific Ocean.

The Temperate Northern Pacific connects, via the Bering Sea, to the Arctic marine realm, which includes the polar waters of the Arctic Ocean. To the south, it transitions to the tropical marine realms of the Pacific, including the Tropical Eastern Pacific along the Pacific coast of the Americas, the Eastern Indo-Pacific in the central Pacific Ocean, and the Central Indo-Pacific of the western Pacific basin. The Taiwan Strait forms the boundary between the Temperate Northern Pacific and the Central Indo-Pacific.

Characteristic fauna include the Pacific salmon and trout (Oncorhynchus spp.), gray whale (Eschrichtius robustus), and North Pacific right whale (Eubalaena japonica).

Coastal waters are home to kelp forests. Kelp forests extend along the west coast of North America from Alaska to Baja California. Kelp are large brown algae which anchor to the sea floor. The dominant species are giant kelp (Macrocystis sp.), which can grow up to 60 metres (200 ft) tall, forming the canopy of the kelp forest and buoyed by air bladders or pneumatocysts at the base of their leaf-like blades. Bull kelp (Nereocystis sp.) is another common canopy species. Species of Saccharina, Laminaria, and Eualaria fistulosa are the predominant kelp species along the coasts of the Russian Far East and Japan. Sea otters (Enhydra lutris) are native to kelp forests of the Temperate Northern Pacific, ranging from the Kuril Islands to Southern California.

== Subdivisions ==
The Temperate Northern Pacific is further subdivided into marine provinces, and the marine provinces divided into marine ecoregions:

=== Cold Temperate Northwest Pacific ===
- Sea of Okhotsk
- Kamchatka Shelf and Coast
- Oyashio Current
- Northern Honshu
- Sea of Japan
- Yellow Sea

=== Warm Temperate Northwest Pacific ===
- Central Kuroshio Current
- East China Sea

=== Cold Temperate Northeast Pacific ===
- Aleutian Islands
- Gulf of Alaska
- North American Pacific Fjordland
- Puget Trough/Georgia Basin
- Oregon, Washington, Vancouver Coast and Shelf
- Northern California

=== Warm Temperate Northeast Pacific ===
- Southern California Bight
- Cortezian
- Magdalena Transition
