= The Guardians of Conchalito =

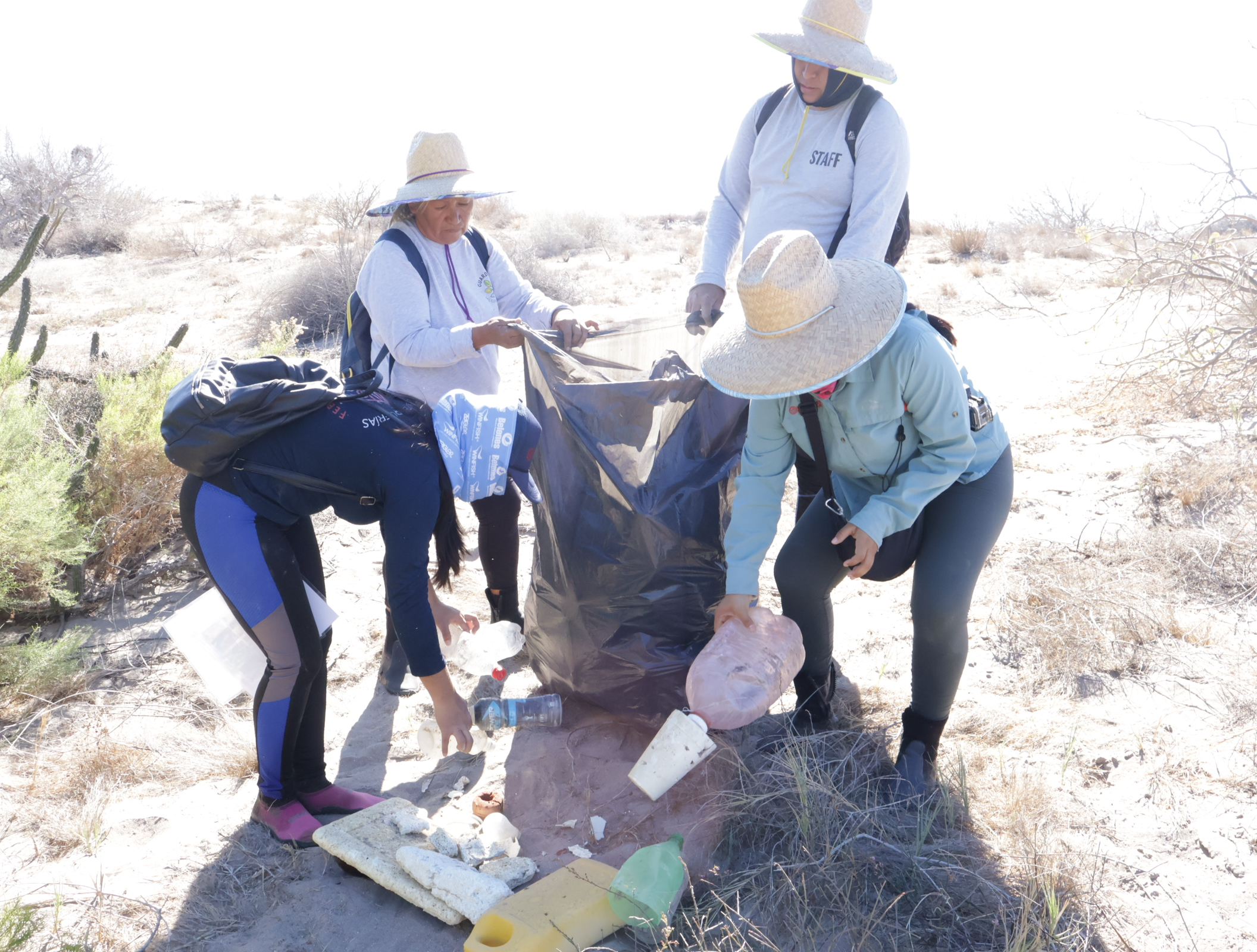
The Guardians of Conchalito cleaning up and monitoring the mangroves.

The Guardians of Conchalito (Las Guardianas del Conchalito) are a group of Mexican women, ecological activists, in La Paz, Baja California Sur, Mexico. They have restored and now monitor and protect the El Conchalito Estuary, a previously degraded mangrove ecosystem. They run a women-only oyster growing business in the region as well as raising mangrove trees to maturity for reforestation.

== Background and activism ==
The El Conchalito Estuary is a coastal wet land and mangrove ecosystem in La Paz. It is important as a coastal protection zone, a biodiversity refuge, and a carbon capture area. For years, urbanization, tourism, pollution and illegal logging have had a seriously negative effect on the flora and fauna of the Northern Mesoamerican Pacific Coast Mangroves area and also on the fishing yields, particularly of scallops, traditionally available for the local population. In 2017, a group of women started to monitor the area, reporting illegal activities such as mangrove felling, waste dumping, poaching and drug dealing. and cleaning up contaminated areas. In 2016, they gained the support of the Organización de Pescadores Rescatando la Ensenada (Organization of Fishermen Rescuing the Bay),(OPRE), a rural production society established in 2016 by 15 fishing cooperatives and 20 independent fishermen. In 2017, the group obtained a concession for 2,048 hectares within the Ensenada, where they now farm commercial scallops, among other products.

The women have received support from a number of other organizations including Noroeste Sustentable the Comisión Nacional de Áreas Naturales Protegidas, Wildcoast, a California-based charity dedicated to conserving coastal and marine ecosystems, the local government, and the UK government.

In 2018, they formally established themselves as The Guardians of Conchalito. On September 14, 2018, they inaugurated a nursery to raise mangrove trees to be transplanted on the coast, so reforesting damaged areas. The group also works to raise awareness in their local community, and in the visiting tourists to the area, of the importance of mangrove ecosystems.

In November 2021, members of a group called Only One provided funding to the Guardians for coastal cleanup mangrove planting. The long-term goal of the guardians is to create an urban nature reserve, involving the recovery of around 11 hectares of ecologically vital mangrove lagoon. Since 2023, with the support of Costa Salvaje and the National Commission of Natural Protected Areas (CONANP), the Guardians have implemented a monthly monitoring program in the mangroves, recording the condition of the three types of mangroves, red, white and black. Their work includes this species identification and also seed collection.

== Reactions ==
The group have faced both harassment by private security forces at some tourist developments in the area, and lack of support from some men in their own community. On the other hand, they have received support from organizations listed above for their environmental conservation, and for the empowerment of local women who have been inspired to defend their environment, so challenging traditional gender roles. Their work has been crucial to the recovery of the ecosystem and the reactivation of the local economy. The guardians are now a legally recognized community co-operative. All members receive a living wage.
