= El Paredón, Guatemala =

Surf town in Guatemala

El Paredón
- Village
- Location in Guatemala
- Coordinates: 13°55′7″N 91°4′29″W
- Country: Guatemala
- Department: Escuintla
- Municipality: Escuintla

Population (2025)
  - Total: 1,500
- Time zone: UTC-6 (Central Standard Time)
- ISO 3166 code: GT-ES

El Paredón is a coastal village on the Pacific Ocean in the Escuintla Department of Guatemala. It lies on the edge of the Sipacate-Naranjo National Park and is known for black sand beaches, mangrove forests, and palm-thatch buildings. It is the most popular destination for surfing in Guatemala.

== Geography ==
El Paredón is located on the southern Pacific coast in the lowlands of Guatemala within the municipality of Escuintla. It lies directly east of the mouth of the Acomé River. The village is 140 km (85 miles) southwest of Guatemala City and had a population of c. 1,500 in 2025.

Situated along a wide black sand beach characteristic of the coastal lowlands, it is bordered inland by tropical mangrove ecosystems found within the Sipacate-Naranjo National Park. The village is accessible by road and is 2.5 hours’ drive from major inland cities such as Guatemala City and Antigua Guatemala.

Beside the settled center of El Paredón exists a small rural village in the mangrove forests bounded by the Acomé river. It is home to some 30 people. Locals canoe from the island to El Paredón proper for primary and secondary school.

== History ==
Originally a small fishing village with limited infrastructure, El Paredón began to grow popular among international tourists and regional visitors after the end of the Guatemalan Civil War. Most of the lowlands of Guatemala were deforested in the 20th century to clear land for farming or for firewood and building materials. Fragments of dry forest remain, including patches of regrowth and natural preserves, and large mangrove forest persists by the village. The area is known for its consistent surf breaks, warm climate, and proximity to protected mangroves.

== Economy ==
Development in the village has been tied to the rise of surf tourism and eco-tourism in the area. Local businesses include surf schools, hostels, restaurants, and tour operators. The beach and coastal waters attract surfers of varying skill levels throughout the year. Traditional fishing also persists alongside tourism as part of the local economy.

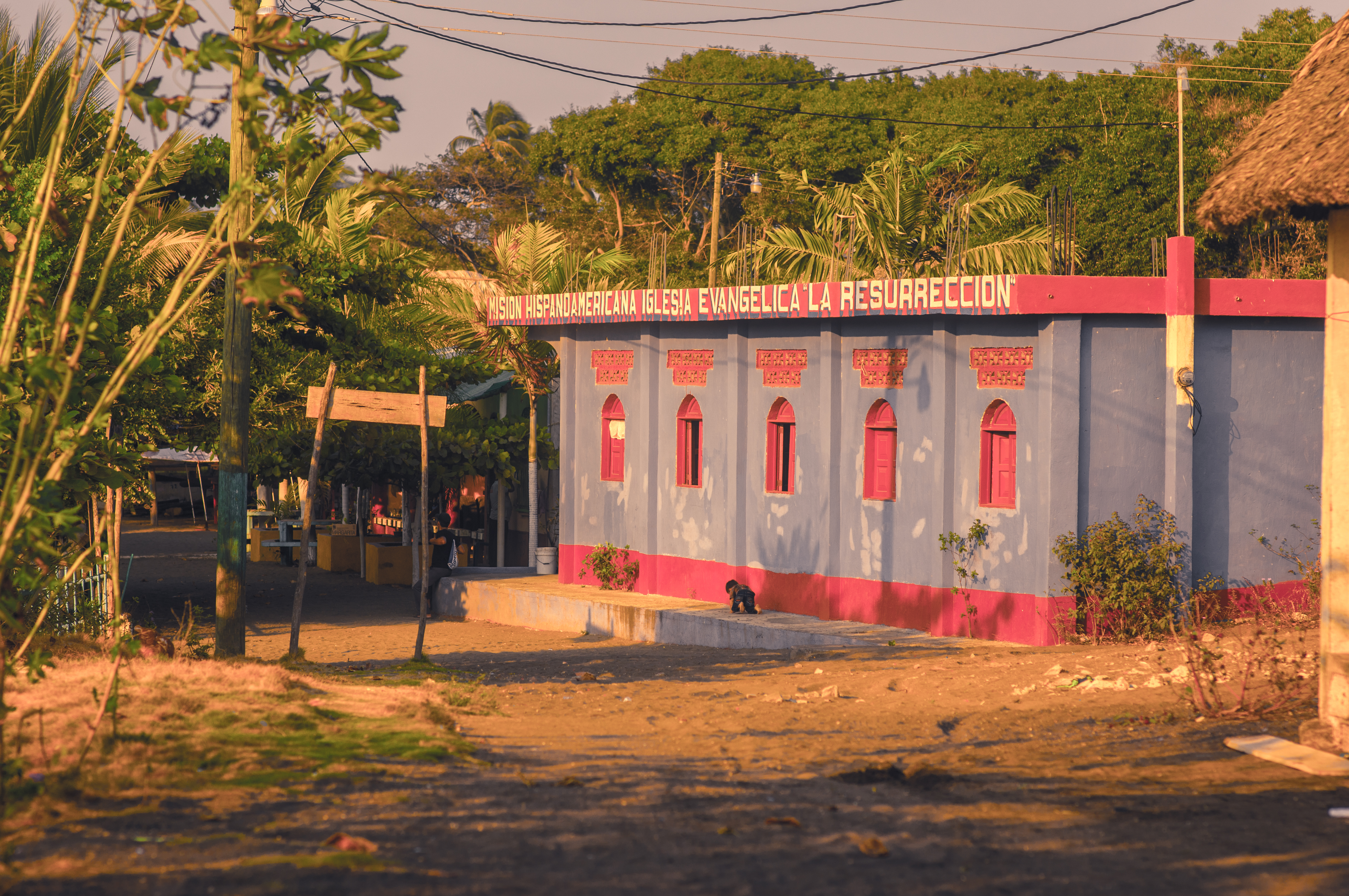
A painted building along the palm-lined street

== Culture and recreation ==
=== Surfing ===
El Paredón is widely regarded as one of Guatemala's premier surfing destinations. The consistent Pacific swells and long beach breaks provide conditions suitable for both beginner and experienced surfers. Surf schools and board rentals are available in the village to support visitors.

=== Nature and wildlife ===
The Sipacate-Naranjo National Park to the west of the village supports diverse wildlife and mangrove forests. Tours through mangrove waterways, kayaking, and boat excursions are common activities. The beaches around El Paredón also serve as nesting grounds for sea turtles such as the green sea turtle, Olive ridley sea turtle, and leatherback sea turtle. Seasonal turtle hatchling releases draw visitors interested in conservation and wildlife experiences.

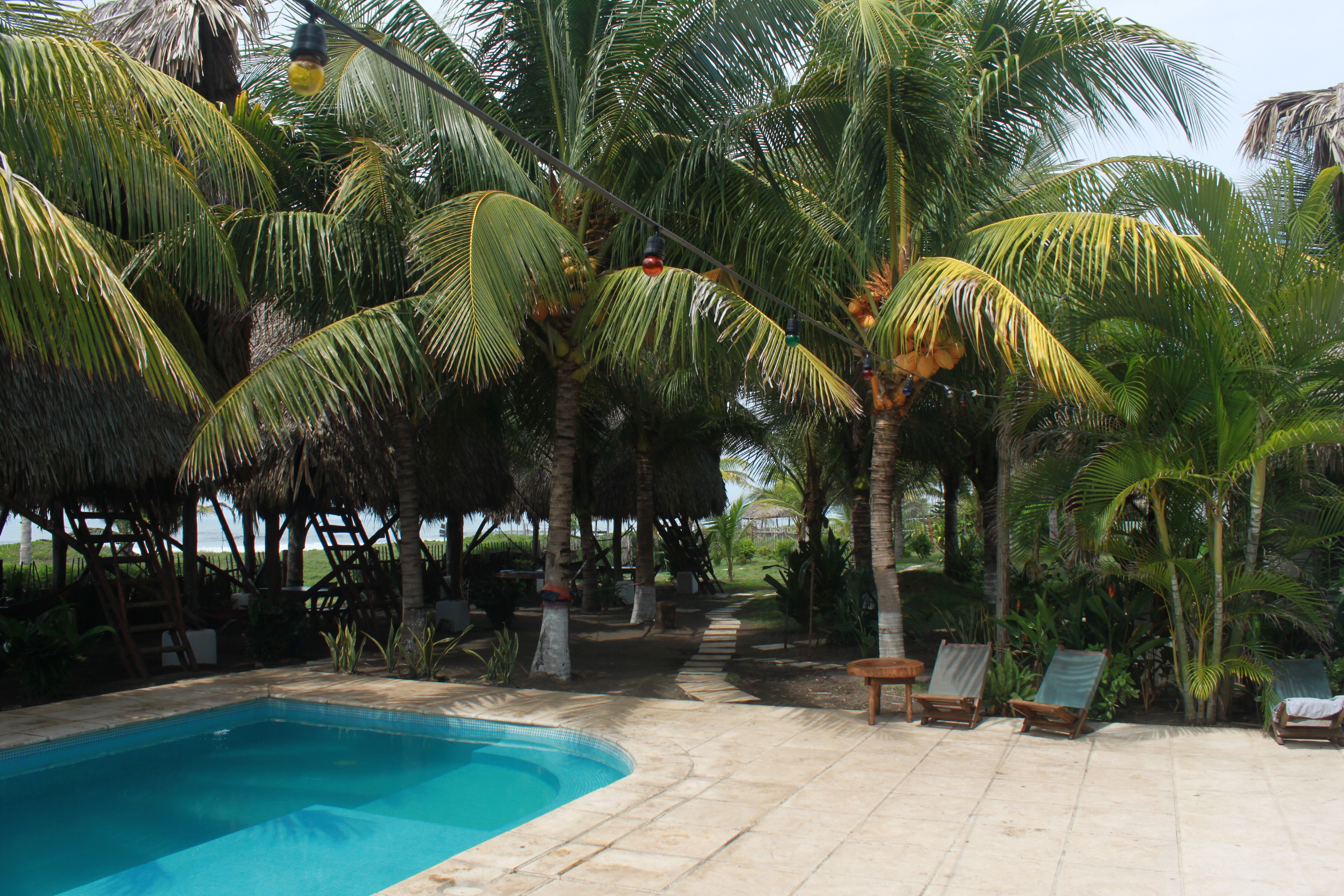
View of hostel in the village

The rivermouth of the Acomé river was historically home to a large population of American crocodiles. In response to predation on livestock such as cattle, settlers in the lowland areas hunted the crocodiles into local extinction. The mangrove forests are home to catfish, mangrove tree crab, Pacific fiddler crab, and dozens of bird species including anhinga, mangrove cuckoo, roseate spoonbill, turquoise-browed motmot, and groove-billed ani, as well as varieties of heron and egret.

=== Tourism ===
El Paredón's small local community supports a social scene with a mix of coastal Guatemalan culture and international visitors. Accommodations range from hostels and surf camps to small hotels and guesthouses.

== Transportation ==
Visitors typically reach El Paredón by road, with shared shuttles and private transfers from Guatemala City, Antigua, and Lake Atitlán being common options. Public bus services like chicken buses also serve the broader region.

== See also ==
- Sipacate-Naranjo National Park
- Escuintla Department
