= North American Pacific Fjordland =

Marine ecoregion

- French: Fjordland du Pacifique Nord-Américain
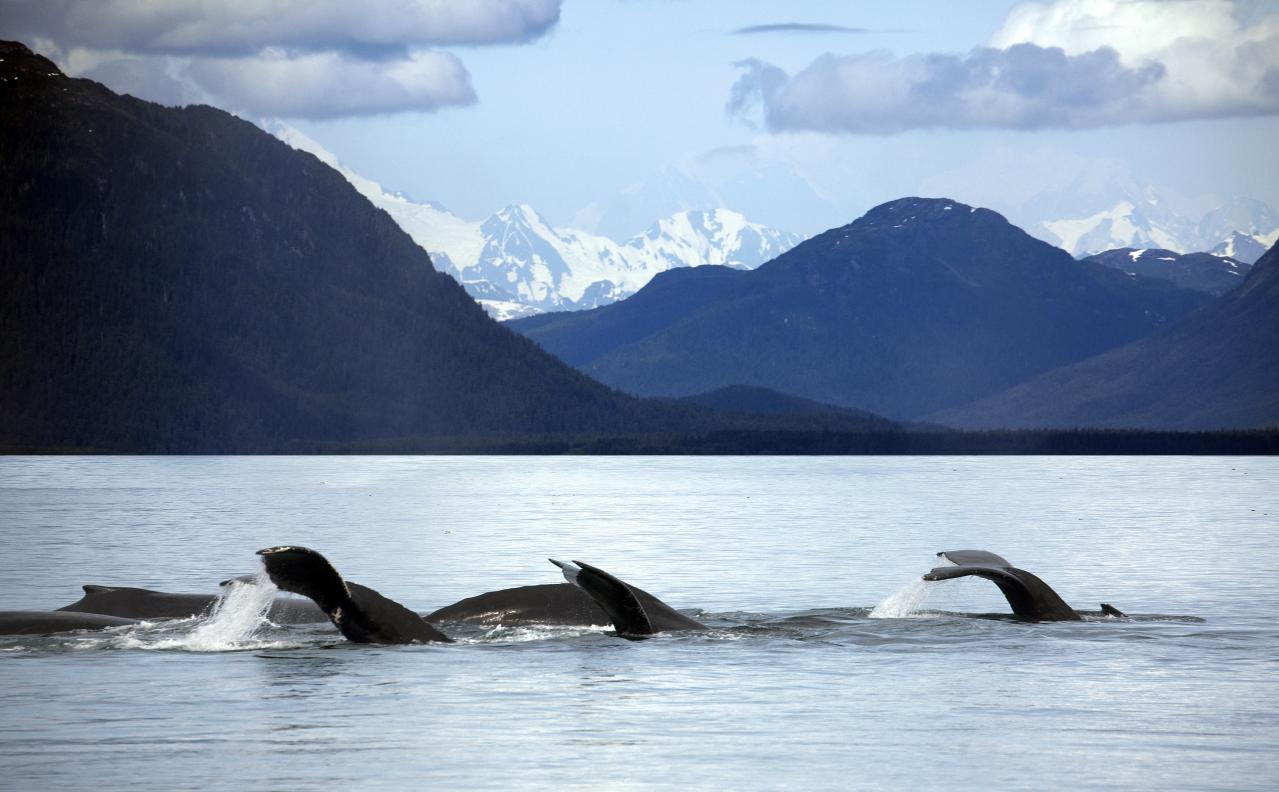
- Humpback whales breaching near the mouth of Glacier Bay in Alaska

- Location within North America
- Location: Pacific Ocean
- Coordinates: 54°30′N 131°20′W
- Type: Marine ecoregion
- Part of: Cold Temperate Northeast Pacific
- Basin countries: Canada and the United States

The North American Pacific Fjordland, also known as the Great Bear Fjordland, is a marine ecoregion off the western coast of North America, part of the Temperate Northern Pacific marine realm. It contains over 20,000 miles (32,000 km) of coastline extending along the continental shelf from Glacier Bay to Queen Charlotte Sound, and extends 200 miles into the Pacific Ocean. It borders the Gulf of Alaska to the north, the Salish Sea to the southeast, and the Oregon, Washington, Vancouver coast and shelf to the south.

The fjordland is connected through oceanographic processes utilizing nutrients and productivity from the North Pacific, and the waterways are critical habitat for substantial Northern Pacific cetacean populations, including fin whales, orca, and humpback whales. Major features include the Inside Passage, a coastal route for ships and boats weaving through a network of passages among the many fjordland islands.

== See also ==
- List of marine ecoregions in Canada (WWF)
- List of marine ecoregions in the United States (WWF)
