= Central American dry forests =

Tropical and subtropical dry broadleaf forests ecoregion in Central America

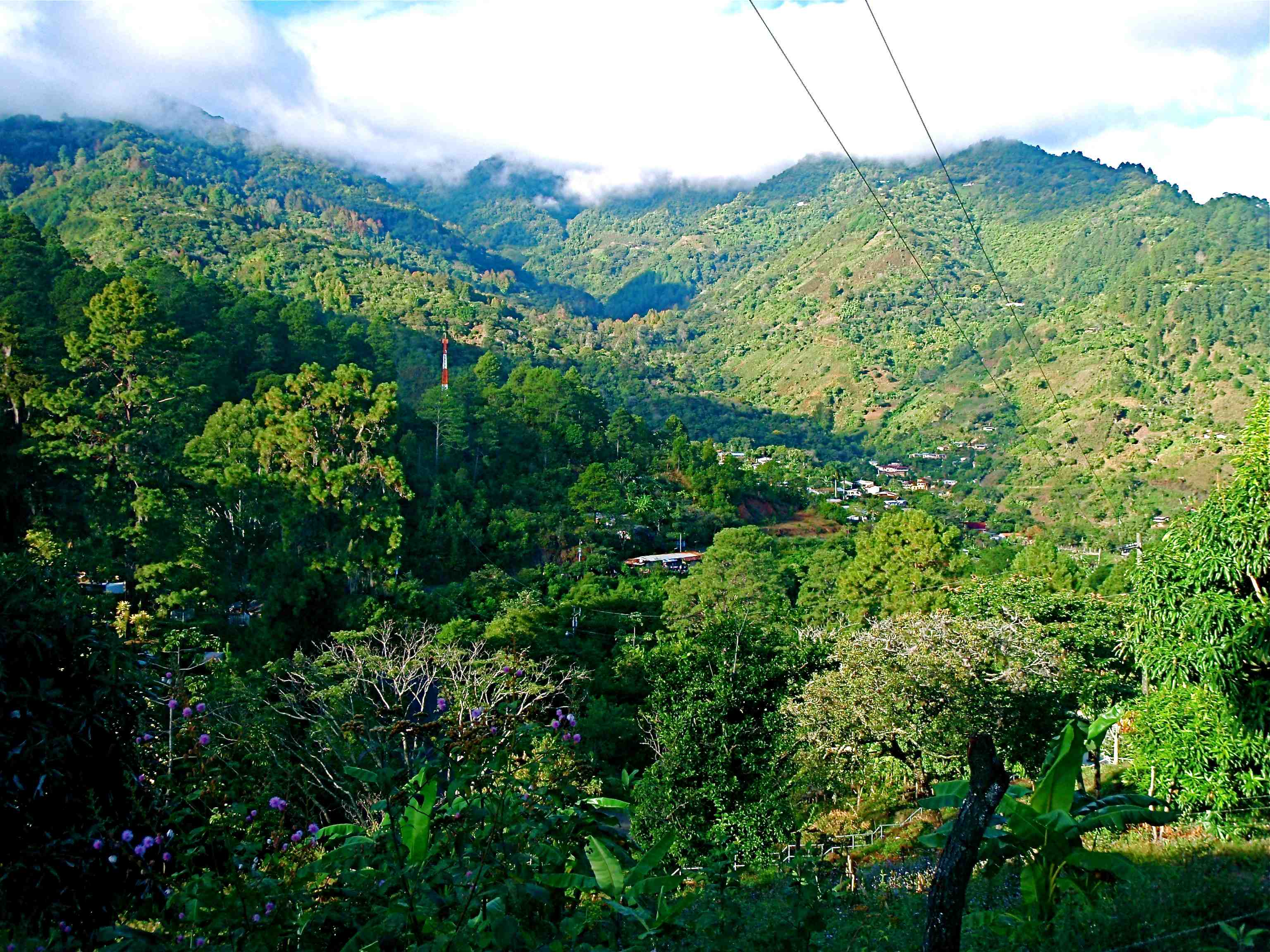
- Valley in La Tigra National Park

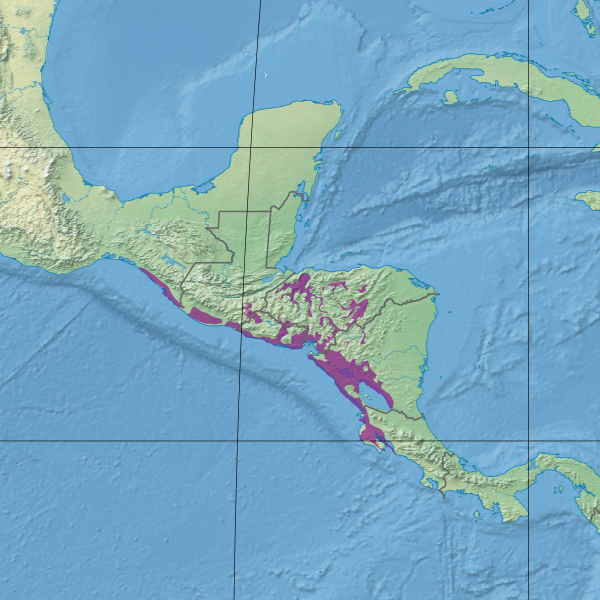
- Ecoregion territory (in purple)

Ecology
- Realm: Neotropical
- Biome: tropical and subtropical dry broadleaf forests
- Borders: List: Central American Atlantic moist forests; Central American pine–oak forests; Costa Rican seasonal moist forests; Gulf of Fonseca mangroves; Isthmian–Atlantic moist forests; Northern Dry Pacific Coast mangroves; Sierra Madre de Chiapas moist forests; Tehuantepec-El Manchon mangroves

Geography
- Area: 68,100 km^{2} (26,300 mi^{2})
- Countries: List: Mexico (Chiapas); Guatemala; El Salvador; Honduras; Nicaragua; Costa Rica

Conservation
- Conservation status: Critical/Endangered
- Protected: 6.75%

The Central American dry forests ecoregion, of the tropical and subtropical dry broadleaf forests biome, is located in Central America.

== Geography ==
The ecoregion covers a total area of approximately 68,100 km^{2}. It extends along the Pacific coast of Central America, from southern Chiapas in southeastern Mexico through Guatemala, El Salvador, Honduras, and Nicaragua to the northeast of Costa Rica. Pockets of dry forest are also found in inland valleys among the Central American mountains. The dry forests extend from sea level up to 800 meters elevation.

== Climate ==
The climate of the ecoregion is tropical. Average annual rainfall is between 1000 and 2000 mm, and is highly seasonal. 5 to 8 months of the year are dry, generally with one longer and one shorter dry period per year.

The Central American mountains generally run from northwest to southeast, and Central America's prevailing winds generally blow from northeast or east to southwest or south. This weather and geologic pattern leaves much the Pacific slope of Central America, and some interior valleys, in the rain shadow of the mountains, and generally drier than the Caribbean side and the mountains.

== Flora ==
The main natural plant community is low-stature dry forest. The forest structure consists of a canopy of trees that may grow up to 30 meters in height in moist areas, and an understory of small trees, large shrubs, and woody lianas. Most canopy trees are deciduous, losing their leaves during the dry season. Many canopy tree species belong to the bean family (Fabaceae) of flowering plants, and have compound leaves. Common canopy trees in the southern portion of the ecoregion include Pachira quinata, Bonellia macrocarpa subsp. pungens, Calycophyllum candidissimum, Casearia arguta, Chomelia spinosa, Croton reflexifolius, Enterolobium cyclocarpum, Eugenia salamensis, Erythroxylum havanense, Guazuma ulmifolia, Tabebuia ochracea, Tabebuia rosea, Thouinidium decandrum, Trichilia americana, and Zanthoxylum setulosum.

The understory includes more evergreen trees and shrubs, often thorny, with members of the Rubiaceae family prominent.

At least 50 plant species are endemic to the ecoregion. The genus Rehdera is endemic to northern Guanacaste Province of Costa Rica.

== Fauna ==
Native mammals include jaguar (Felis onca), puma (Puma concolor), ocelot (Leopardus pardalis), margay (Leopardus wiedii), jaguarundi (Herpailurus yagouaroundi), Baird's tapir (Tapirus bairdii), northern tamandua (Tamandua mexicana), and Central American spider monkey (Ateles geoffroyi).

Near-endemic and limited-range bird species native to the ecoregion include the white-bellied chachalaca (Ortalis leucogastra), blue-tailed hummingbird (Saucerottia cyanura), giant wren (Campylorhynchus chiapensis), and Pacific parakeet (Psittacara strenuus).

== Conservation ==
Much of the ecoregion has been cleared and converted into pastures for cattle grazing, which is the main cause of its destruction. It is ranked critical/endangered by the World Wildlife Fund.

== Protected areas ==
6.75% of the ecoregion is in protected areas. Protected areas include:

- Agalta National Park, Honduras
- Azul Meámbar National Park, Honduras
- Barra Honda National Park, Costa Rica
- Carara National Park, Costa Rica
- El Imposible National Park, El Salvador
- Guanacaste National Park, Costa Rica
- La Tigra National Park, Honduras
- Las Baulas de Guanacaste Marine National Park, Costa Rica
- Montaña de Botaderos Carlos Escaleras Mejía National Park, Honduras
- Montaña de Comayagua National Park, Honduras
- Palo Verde National Park, Costa Rica
- Pico Bonito National Park, Honduras
- Pico Píjol National Park, Honduras
- San Diego and San Felipe Las Barras National Park, El Salvador
- Santa Bárbara National Park, Honduras
- Santa Rosa National Park, Costa Rica
- Sipacate-Naranjo National Park, Guatemala

== See also ==
- List of ecoregions in Mexico
- List of ecoregions in Guatemala
- Ecoregions of Central America
- ecoregions of the Tropical and subtropical dry broadleaf forests biome
