= Northern Dry Pacific Coast mangroves =

Ecoregion in Central America

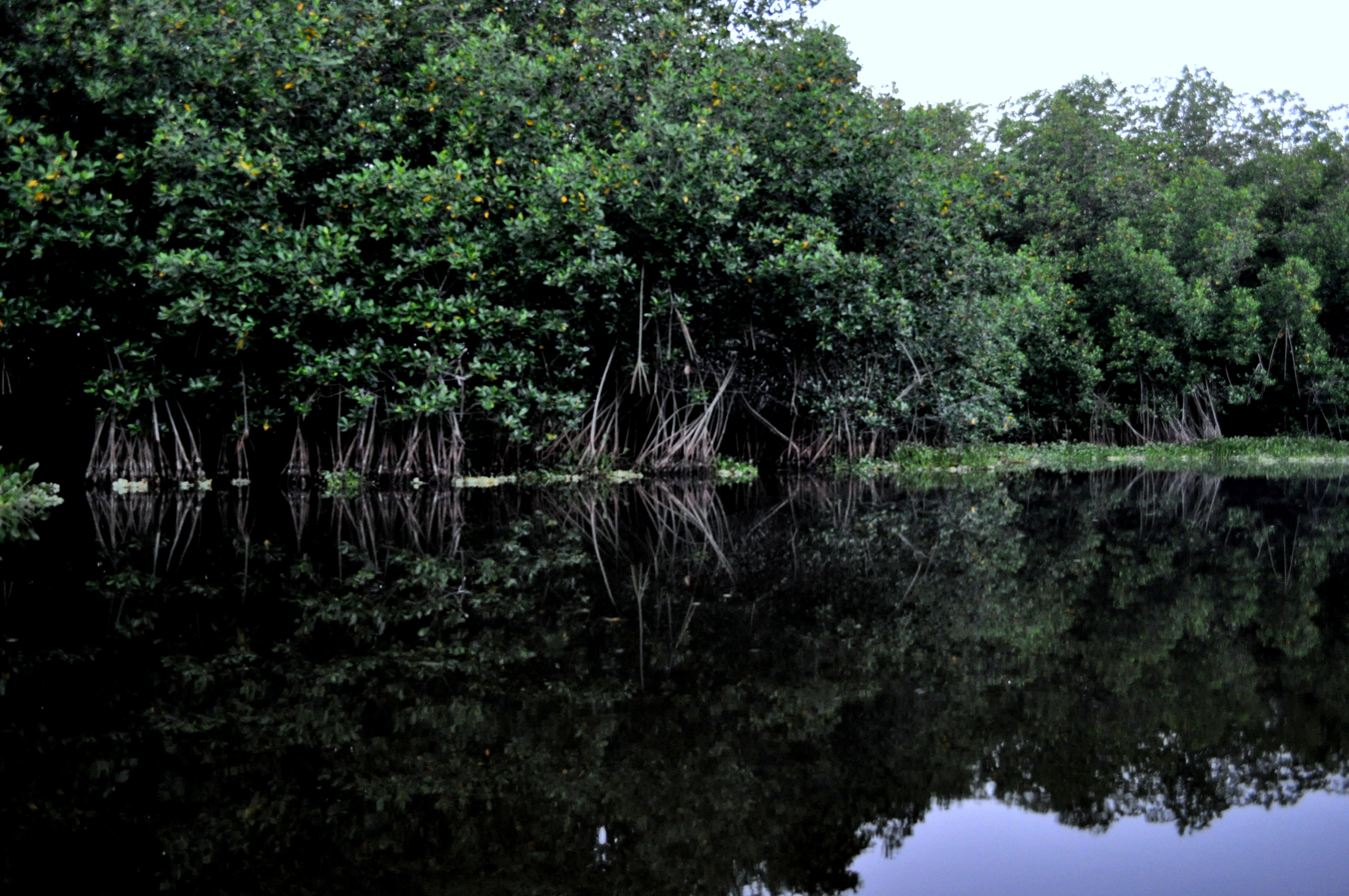
- Mangroves in Monterrico, Guatemala

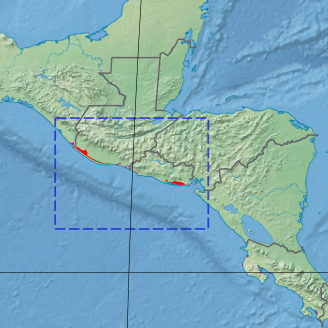
- Ecoregion territory (in red)

Ecology
- Realm: Neotropic
- Biome: Mangroves

Geography
- Area: 1,035 km^{2} (400 mi^{2})
- Country: Guatemala, El Salvador
- Coordinates: 13.9°N 90.46°W

The Northern Dry Pacific Coast mangroves ecoregion (WWF ID: NT1425) covers the mangrove habitats in a series of sites along the Pacific Ocean coast of Guatemala and El Salvador. This part of Central America is relatively dry compared to higher elevations or more southerly areas, so the wetland mangroves serve as a refuge for animals of the interior during the winter dry season. The mangroves only extend a few kilometers inland to where the salt water influence is gone; the ecoregion surrounding the mangroves is the Central American dry forests ecoregion.

== Location and description ==
The individual mangrove sites are on the brackish margins of lagoons, bays, and river estuaries. Individual sites include: Rio Paz, Rio Acome and Rio Lempa estuaries and behind Barra de Santiago and Monterrico Lagoons.

- Coastal Retalhuleu Department, Guatemala
- Coastal Escuintla Department, Guatemala
- Coastal Santa Rosa Department, Guatemala
- Los Esclavos River estuary at the lagoon of Sipacate, Guatemala
- Acomé River estuary, in Escuintla Department of Guatemala
- The lagoon behind Barra de Santiago, which receives runoff from the mountains inland
- Estero de Jaltepeque, a lagoon 5 km west of the mouth of the Lempa River
- Jiquilisco Bay, towards the east end of the El Salvador coast, is a biosphere reserve and a RAMSAR wetland of international importance.

== Climate ==
The climate of the ecoregion is Tropical monsoon climate (Köppen climate classification (Am)). This climate is characterized by relatively even temperatures throughout the year (all months being greater than 18 °C (64 °F) average temperature), and a pronounced dry season. The driest month has less than 60 mm of precipitation, but more than (100-(average/25) mm. This climate is mid-way between a tropical rainforest and a tropical savannah. The dry months are in the winter.

== Flora and fauna ==
The mangroves in this ecoregion are more less fully developed than those farther south because of the lower precipitation. Mangrove trees in the ecoregion are characteristically red mangrove (Rhizophora mangle), Rhizophora harrisonii, and Rhizophora racemosa. There are also stands of white mangrove (Laguncularia racemosa) and button mangrove (Conocarpus erectus). Black mangrove (Avicennia germinans) and Avicennia bicolor may be found on higher, clay soils.

== Protected areas ==
Officially protected areas in the ecoregion include:

- Bahia Jiquilisco Biosphere Reserve
- Biotopo Monterrico-Hawaii
