= Magdalena Transition =

Marine ecoregion in the eastern Pacific Ocean

The Magdalena Transition is a marine ecoregion in the eastern Pacific Ocean. It includes the coastal waters along the southwestern Baja California Peninsula, extending from Punta Abreojos in the north to Cabo San Lucas at the peninsula's southern tip.

The ecoregion includes San Ignacio Lagoon and Magdalena Bay. These lagoons include some of the northernmost mangroves on the Pacific Coast of North America. Gray whales (Eschrichtius robustus) migrate annually along the Pacific Coast to mate in these lagoons.

The ecoregion is a transition between two marine realms, the Temperate Northern Pacific and the Tropical Eastern Pacific. Marine Ecoregions of the World includes the entire Magdalena Transition ecoregion in the Temperate Northern Pacific, but others, including John C. Briggs, conclude that the Tropical Eastern Pacific extends to the vicinity of Magdalena Bay.
