= Sipacate =

- Municipality and town
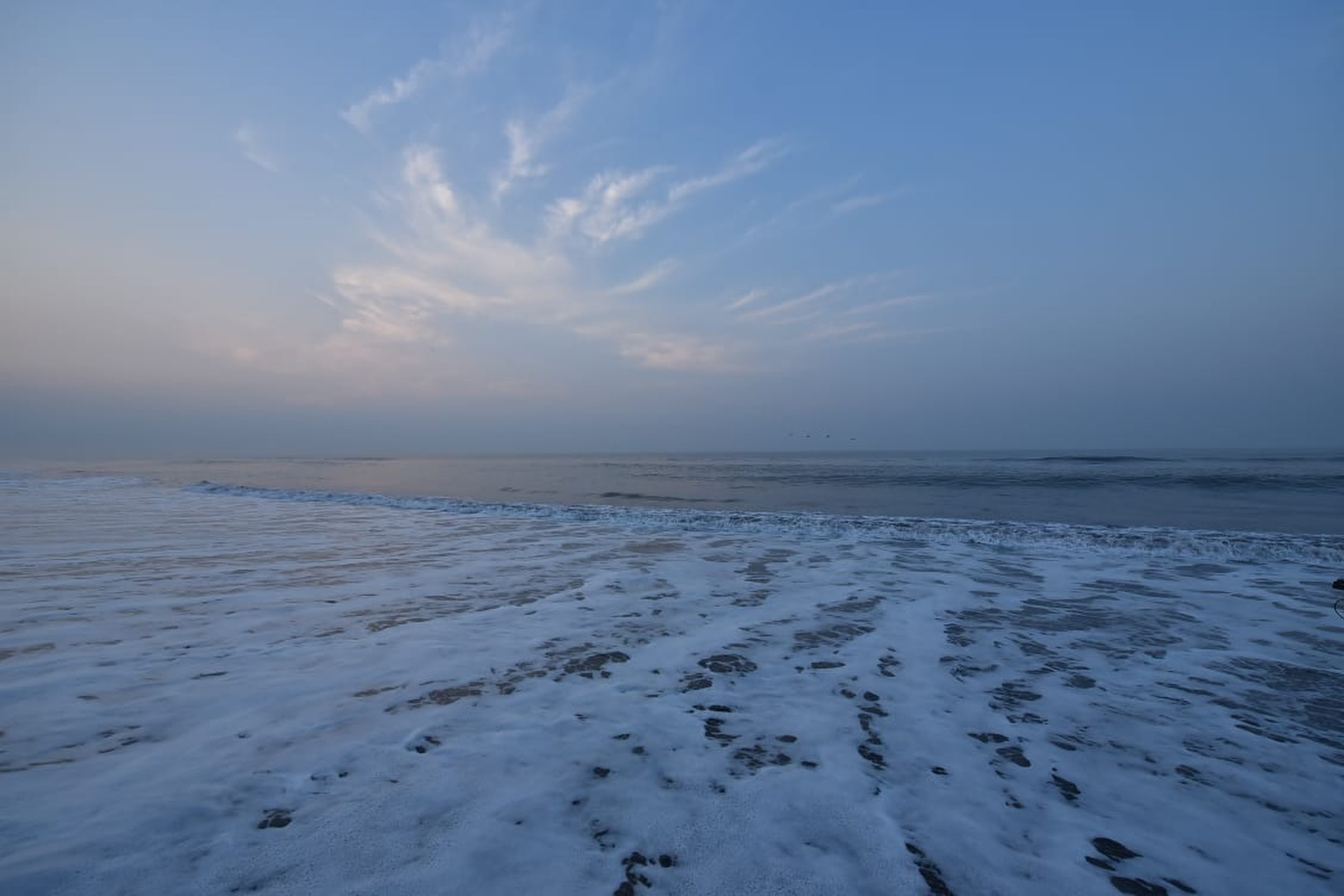

- Location in Guatemala
- Coordinates: 13°56′0″N 91°09′0″W
- Country: Guatemala
- Department: Escuintla Department
- Founded: 2015-10-14

Area
  - Municipality and town: 265 km^{2} (102 sq mi)
- Elevation: 4 m (13 ft)

Population (2018 census)
  - Municipality and town: 16,234
  - Density: 61.3/km^{2} (159/sq mi)
  - Urban: 9,959
- Time zone: UTC-6 (Central Time Zone)

Sipacate is a resort town and municipality on the Pacific coast of Guatemala, in Escuintla Department about 36 kilometres (22 mi) west of Puerto San José. It is promoted as a venue for surfing. Being roughly in the center of the Guatemalan coastline, it is used as a breakpoint for storm warnings. The Sipicate-Naranjo National Park is located east of the town. The municipality was formerly a part of La Gomera Municipality just north of Sipacate.

== Archaeology ==
Some very early human settlements are documented in Sipacate, connected with early agriculture.

In sum, sediments sampled in the Sipacate locality appear to document two distinct waves of deforestation associated with early horticulture. The earliest began shortly after 3500 cal B.C. and involved multiple episodes of forest clearance over the next 800 years. The second began after 1700 cal B.C. and coincides with the archaeologically documented presence of Early Formative populations.

== Climate ==
Sipacate has tropical climate (Köppen: Aw).

Climate data for Sipacate
Month	Jan	Feb	Mar	Apr	May	Jun	Jul	Aug	Sep	Oct	Nov	Dec	Year
Mean daily maximum °C (°F)	32.5 (90.5)	33.1 (91.6)	33.7 (92.7)	34.2 (93.6)	33.5 (92.3)	32.1 (89.8)	32.4 (90.3)	32.7 (90.9)	32.0 (89.6)	31.8 (89.2)	32.3 (90.1)	32.6 (90.7)	32.7 (90.9)
Daily mean °C (°F)	26.0 (78.8)	26.6 (79.9)	27.5 (81.5)	28.6 (83.5)	27.7 (81.9)	27.7 (81.9)	27.7 (81.9)	27.5 (81.5)	27.0 (80.6)	27.1 (80.8)	26.7 (80.1)	26.7 (80.1)	27.2 (81.0)
Mean daily minimum °C (°F)	19.5 (67.1)	20.1 (68.2)	21.4 (70.5)	23.0 (73.4)	23.7 (74.7)	23.4 (74.1)	23.0 (73.4)	22.8 (73.0)	23.0 (73.4)	22.2 (72.0)	21.9 (71.4)	20.8 (69.4)	22.1 (71.7)
Average precipitation mm (inches)	2 (0.1)	1 (0.0)	9 (0.4)	44 (1.7)	166 (6.5)	274 (10.8)	242 (9.5)	224 (8.8)	287 (11.3)	275 (10.8)	43 (1.7)	4 (0.2)	1,571 (61.8)
Source: Climate-Data.org

== Geographic location ==
Sipacate is surrounded by Escuintla Departament municipalities and by the Pacific Ocean.

== Notable people ==
- Tránsito Montepeque - Guatemalan international football player
