= Northern Mesoamerican Pacific Coast Mangroves =

Mangrove ecoregion in northwestern Mexico

Northern Mesoamerican Pacific Mangroves
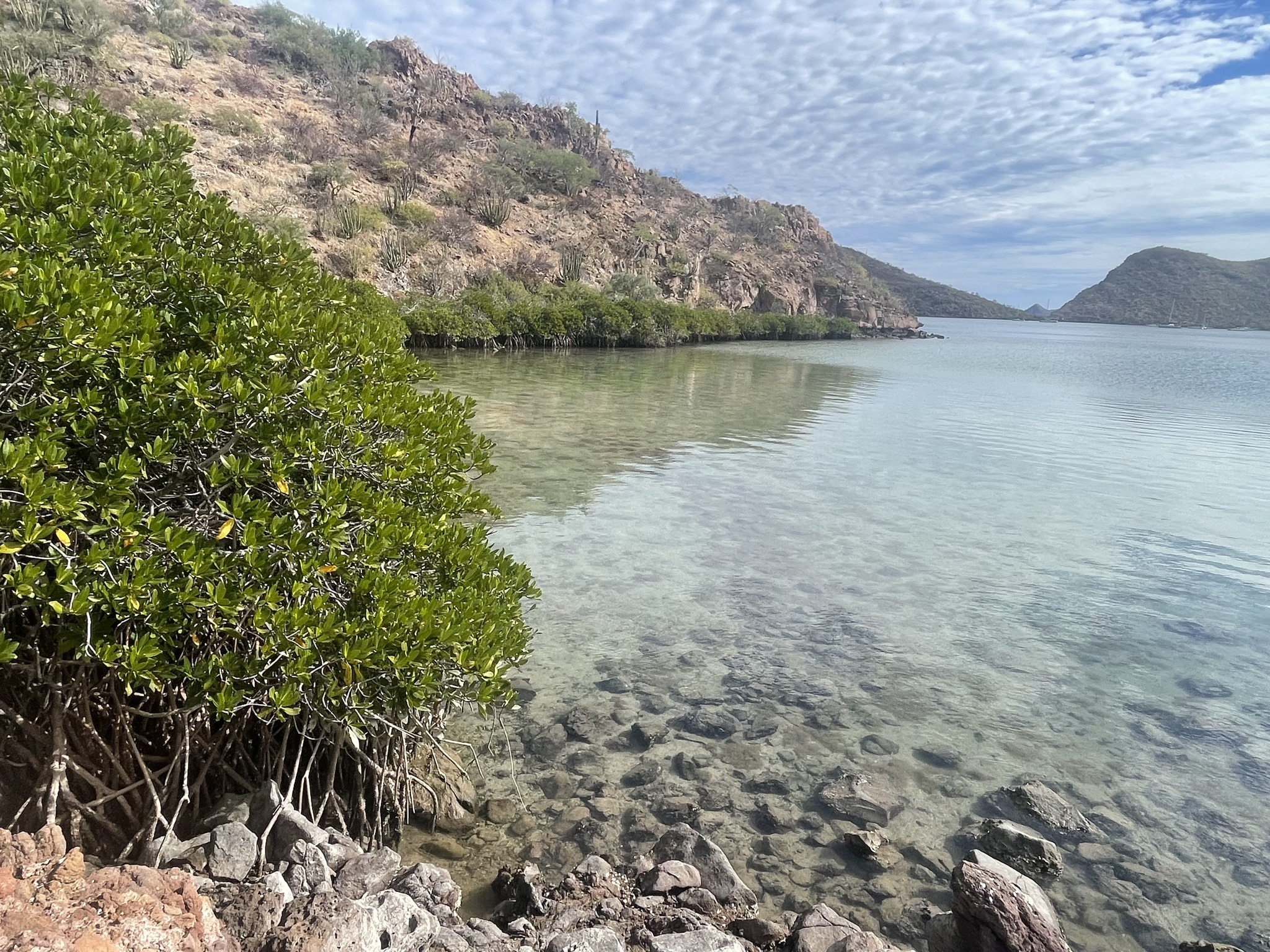
- Red Mangrove in Baja California

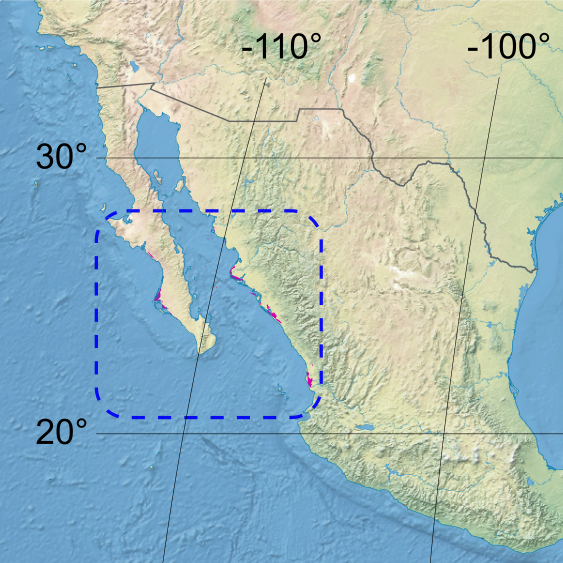
- Ecoregion territory (in purple)

Ecology
- Realm: Nearctic
- Biome: Mangroves

Geography
- Area: 4,920 km^{2} (1,900 sq mi)
- Country: Mexico
- States: Baja California Sur; Sinaloa; Sonora

Conservation
- Conservation status: Critical/endangered

The Northern Mesoamerican Pacific Mangroves is a mangrove ecoregion of the southern Baja California Peninsula and coastal Sonora and northern Sinaloa states in northwestern Mexico. They are the northernmost mangroves on the Pacific Coast of North America and the region is transitional between tropical and temperate seas.

== Geography ==
The Northern Mesoamerican Pacific Mangroves are composed of two main mangrove areas located on the Pacific Coast and the Gulf of California Coast. Magdalena Bay is the largest area on the Pacific coast, along with San Ignacio Lagoon and Ojo de Liebre Lagoon, and on Cedros Island and Guadalupe Island off the coast.

The Sonoran and Sinaloan mangroves are found mostly in the deltas of the Yaqui, Mayo, and Fuerte rivers, along with Lechuguilla Bay near Los Mochis, Agiabampo Bay, Yávaros wetlands, Tóbari estuary, Lobos Bay, and the La Tortuga, Las Cruces, and Los Algodones estuaries.

Mangrove areas on the eastern coast of the Baja California Peninsula include El Mogote and El Conchalito on the Ensenada de la Paz.

== Flora ==
Rhizophora mangle and Laguncularia racemosa are the dominant Pacific coast mangrove species. Because of the nutrient-limited conditions, the mangrove forests are generally low, growing up to one meter in height.

On the Sonoran coast, R. mangle, L. racemosa, Avicennia germinans, and Conocarpus erectus are the dominant mangroves.

== Fauna ==
The food and shelter provided by the mangroves support communities of oysters, crabs, invertebrate larvae, and juvenile fish.

Seabirds and shorebirds use the mangroves as a source of food (invertebrates and fish), and as rest areas and winter residences. The mangroves also support migrating songbirds, raptors, and shorebirds.

The Sonoran mangroves are habitat for the San Blas jay (Cyanocorax sanblasianus) and the purplish-backed jay (C. beecheii).

== Conservation and threats ==
Threats to the mangroves include coastal development, sedimentation, eutrophication, and deforestation. Mangroves in the Gulf of California are disappearing at a rate of 2% annually. Coastal development around La Paz destroyed 23% of the local mangroves between 1973 and 1981. Since 2017, efforts have been made by The Guardians of Conchalito to restore and protect the mangroves of the El Conchalito Estuary.

== Protected areas ==
The San Ignacio and Ojo de Liebre mangroves are within the Vizcaíno Biosphere Reserve, which protects the mangroves as well as adjacent marine and upland areas. Guadalupe Island is also a biosphere reserve. Several mangrove areas in Sonora and Sinaloa are designated Ramsar sites.

== See also ==
- List of ecoregions in Mexico
