= Petén–Veracruz moist forests =

Forest ecoregion in Belize, Guatemala, and Mexico

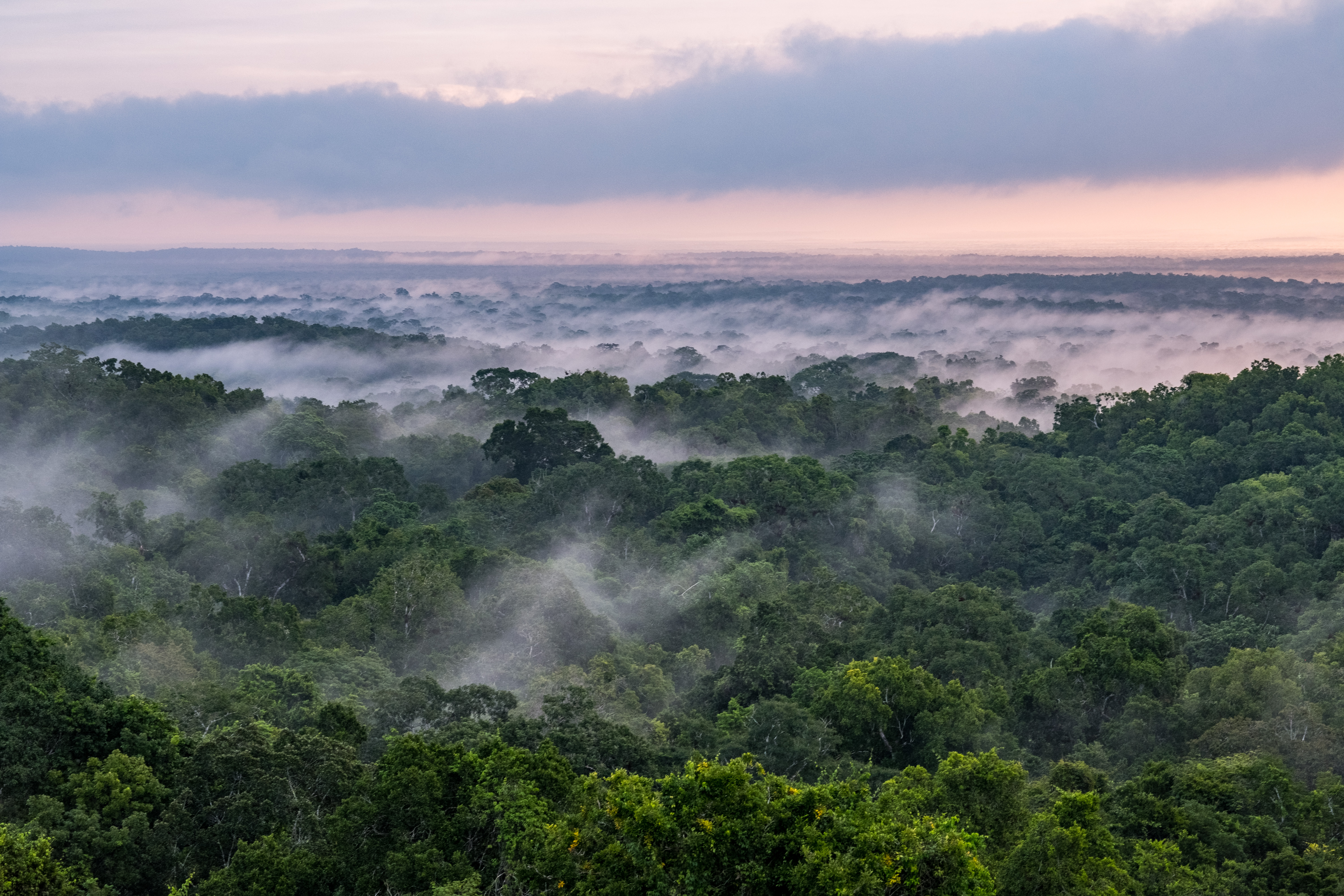
- Aerial view of the forest in Petén, Guatemala

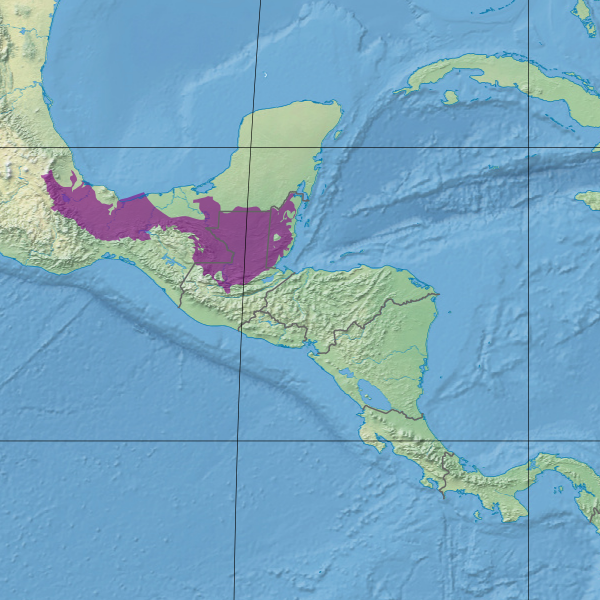
- Ecoregion territory (in purple)

Ecology
- Realm: Neotropical
- Biome: tropical and subtropical moist broadleaf forests
- Borders: List: Belizian pine forests; Central American Atlantic moist forests; Central American pine–oak forests; Chiapas montane forests; Chiapas Depression dry forests; Chimalapas montane forests; Mesoamerican Gulf–Caribbean mangroves; Oaxacan montane forests; Pantanos de Centla; Sierra de los Tuxtlas; Sierra Madre de Oaxaca pine–oak forests; Veracruz dry forests; Veracruz moist forests; Yucatan moist forests
- Bird species: 468
- Mammal species: 191

Geography
- Area: 149,100 km^{2} (57,600 mi^{2})
- Countries: Mexico; Belize; Guatemala

Conservation
- Conservation status: critical/endangered
- Habitat loss: 23.595%
- Protected: 24.25%

The Petén–Veracruz moist forests is an ecoregion of the tropical and subtropical moist broadleaf forest biome found in Belize, Guatemala, and Mexico.

== Setting ==
The Petén–Veracruz moist forests cover an area of 149,100 square kilometers (57,600 sq mi), extending from central Veracruz state across portions of the Mexican states of Oaxaca, Tabasco, Chiapas, and Campeche, as well as northern Guatemala and most of Belize. It includes the Lacandon Forest of Chiapas and the Petén Basin of Guatemala. The Petén–Veracruz moist forests mostly occupy a coastal lowland with meandering rivers, including the Blanco, Papaloapan, Coatzacoalcos, Tonalá, Grijalva, Usumacinta, and Hondo.

Adjacent ecoregions

The ecoregion is bounded on the south by a series of mountain ranges and highlands, including the Sierra Madre de Oaxaca, Sierra Madre de Chiapas, Chiapas Plateau, and Guatemalan Highlands, where the lowland Petén–Veracruz forests yield to montane moist forests and pine–oak forests. In central Veracruz, the Veracruz dry forests separate the Petén–Veracruz moist forests from the Veracruz moist forests further north. The western portion of the ecoregion mostly extends to the Gulf of Mexico, although the montane forests of the Sierra de los Tuxtlas and the flooded forests and wetlands of the Pantanos de Centla constitute distinct ecoregions.

The eastern portion of the ecoregion is bounded on the north by the Yucatán moist forests, which extend east and west across the Yucatán Peninsula. The Petén–Veracruz moist forests extend east to the Caribbean Sea in Belize, surrounding enclaves of Belizian pine forests in the Maya Mountains and near the coast. The Belizean Coast mangroves run along the Caribbean coast.

== People ==
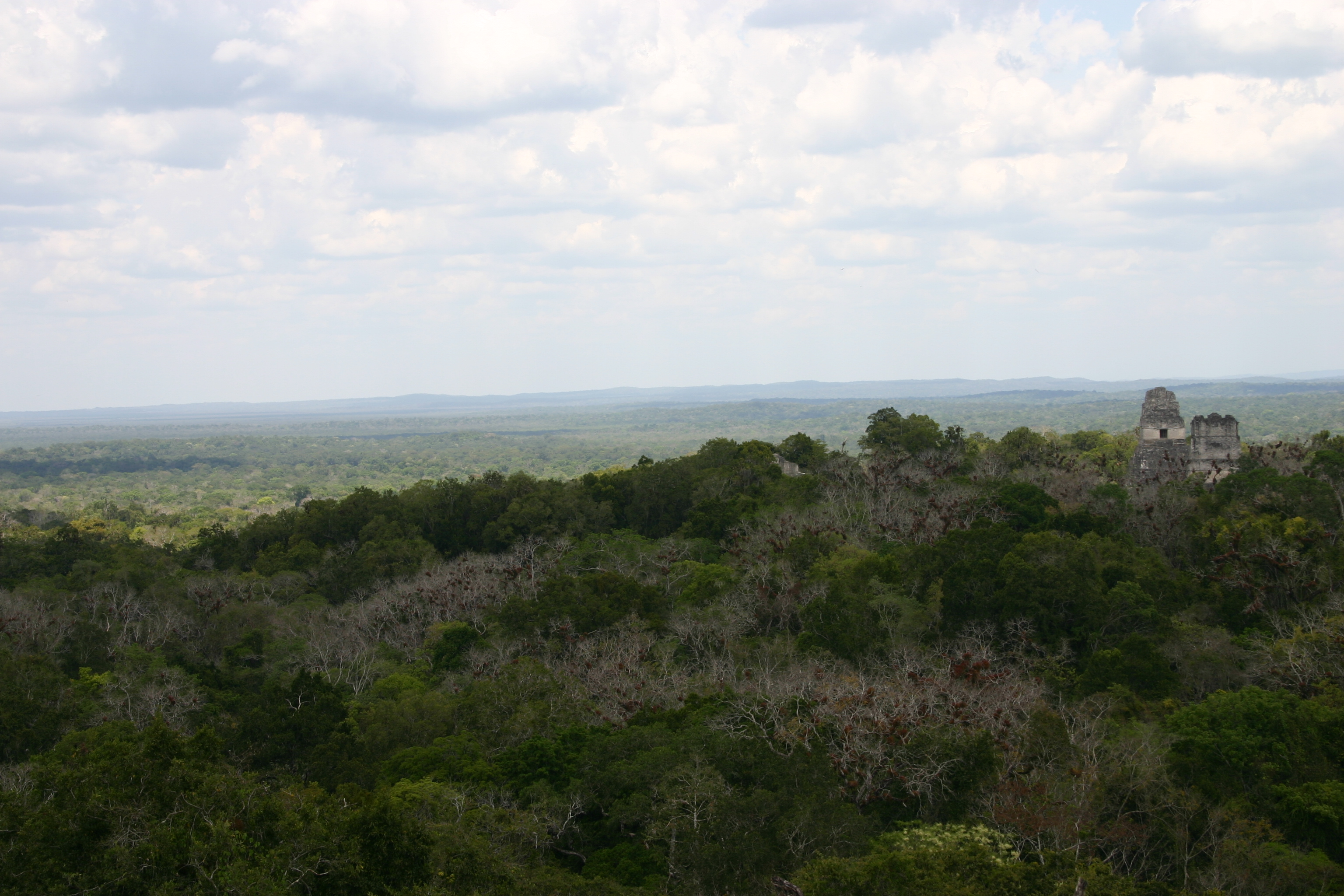
Forest surrounding ruins of Tikal, Guatemala

The northern Petén–Veracruz moist forests were home to the Olmec culture, which built cities between 1200 and 400 BCE. The Classic Maya civilisation (250-900 CE) was centered in the eastern and southern portions of the ecoregion, known as the Selva Maya, from Tabasco and northern Chiapas across northern Guatemala to Belize.

Today, modern Mayan people inhabit the eastern portion of the ecoregion, while Mixe–Zoque and Nahuatl peoples inhabit the western portion.

== Conservation ==
22% of the ecoregion is in protected areas. These include the Maya Biosphere Reserve in Guatemala, and the Montes Azules Biosphere Reserve in Mexico.

Other protected areas include Tikal, El Rosario, Guanacaste, Monkey Bay, Sarstoon-Temash, Sierra del Lacandón, Cañón del Sumidero, Cañón del Río Blanco, and Palenque national parks, Calakmul, Nahá–Metzabok, and Selva El Ocote biosphere reserves, Bladen Nature Reserve, and Cañón del Usumacinta, Cascada de Agua Azul, and Chan-Kin flora and fauna protection areas.

== See also ==
- List of ecoregions in Guatemala
- List of ecoregions in Mexico
