= Acomé River =

River in Guatemala

- Location of mouth

Location
- Country: Guatemala

Physical characteristics
- Mouth
  - coordinates: 13.9171°N 91.0883°W

The Acomé River is a river in Guatemala. It is a short coastal river in the southwest of the country, with a length of 58.5 kilometres (36.4 mi). It begins in the vicinity of the town of Santa Lucia Cotzumalguapa, in the Escuintla Department, and runs southward, crossing the coastal plain of Escuintla to empty into the Pacific Ocean by the village of El Paredón. The Acomé watershed has a population of about 53,510 people.

== See also ==
- List of rivers of Guatemala

== Bibliography ==
- Mapa de Cuencas y Ríos (INSIVUMEH)
- "Water Resources Assessment of Guatemala" (PDF). US Army Corps of Engineers. June 2000. Archived from the original (PDF) on 2009-01-09.
- "Guatemala - Surface Water Map" (PDF). US Army Corps of Engineers. June 2000. Archived from the original (PDF) on 2009-01-09.
- Rand McNally, The New International Atlas, 1993.
- CIA map: Image:Guatemala geopolitical.jpg
- UN map: Image:Un-guatemala.png
