= Belizean pine forests =

Terrestrial ecoregion in Belize

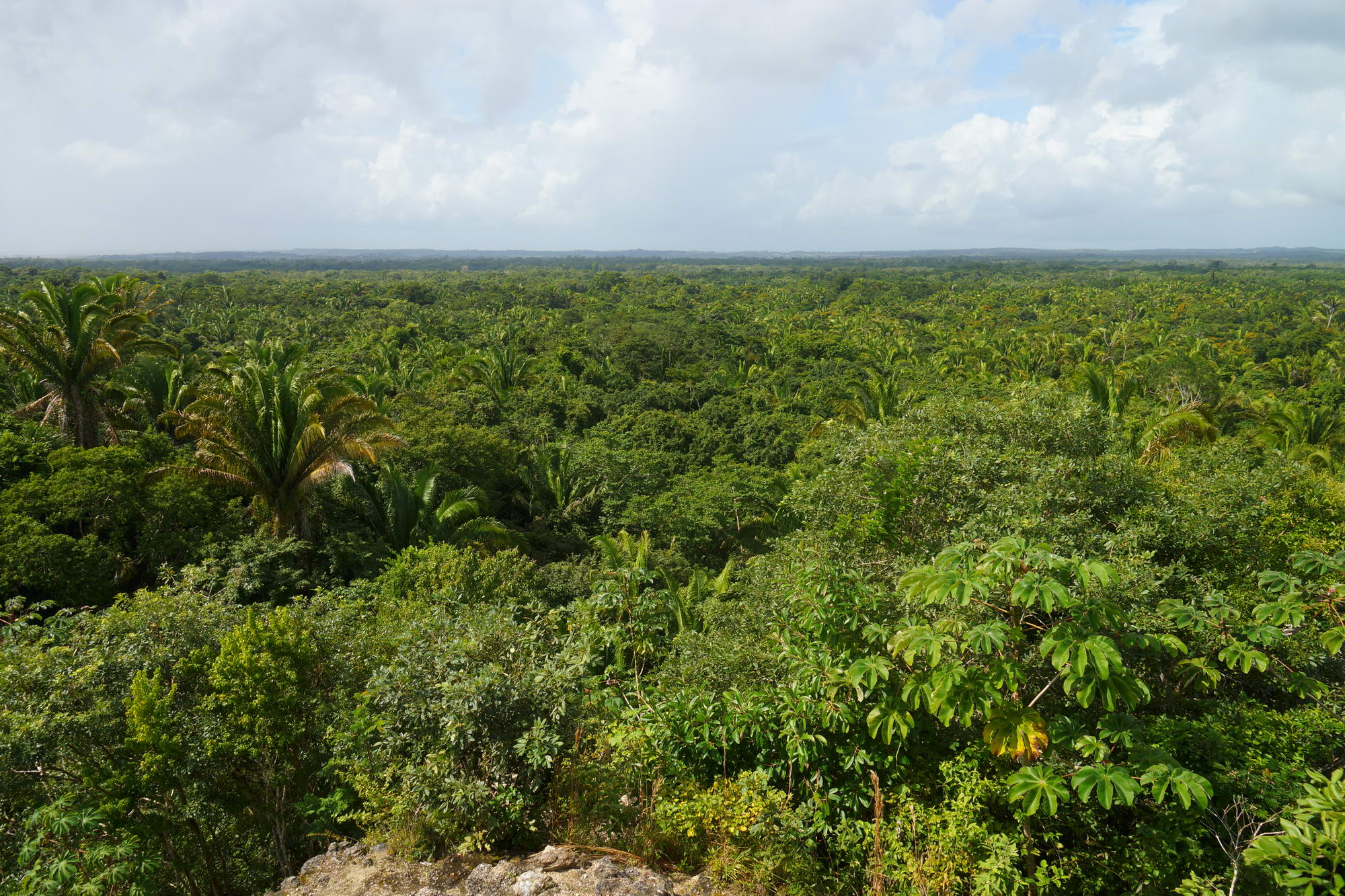
- At Lamanai, Belize

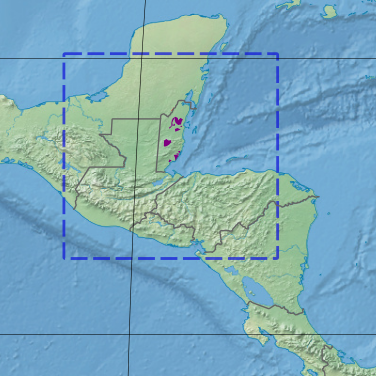
- Ecoregion territory (in purple)

Ecology
- Realm: Neotropical
- Biome: tropical and subtropical coniferous forests
- Borders: Petén–Veracruz moist forests; Belizean Coast mangroves

Geography
- Area: 2,822 km^{2} (1,090 sq mi)
- Country: Belize, Mexico, Guatemala
- Coordinates: 16.9558°N 88.9796°W

Conservation
- Conservation status: Critical/endangered
- Protected: 894 km^{2}%)

The Belizean pine forests is an ecoregion that represents an example of lowland and premontane pine forests in the Neotropical realm, where the dominant tree species is Caribbean pine. The vegetation here is generally adapted to the xeric, acidic and nutrient-poor conditions along the Belizean near coastal zone of the Caribbean versant.

== Location and description ==
The ecoregion is almost entirely located in Belize, with a few very small tracts in Mexico and Guatemala. The ecoregion is spread across several small, disconnected sites. The inland sites are in the center and north and on plains and lowland terrain. The coastal, southern sites are more fragmented.

== Climate ==
The climate of the ecoregion is Tropical monsoon climate (Köppen climate classification (Am)). This climate is characterized by relatively even temperatures throughout the year (all months being greater than 18 °C (64 °F) average temperature), and a pronounced dry season. The driest month has less than 60 mm of precipitation, but more than (100-(average/25) mm. This climate is mid-way between a tropical rainforest and a tropical savannah. Precipitation averages 2,000 mm/year.

== Flora and fauna ==
The characteristic tree species of the ecoregion is the Caribbean pine (Pinus caribaea). 62% of the small ecoregion is wet tropical forest (closed and open), 25% is herbaceous wetland, 5% is shrub, and the small remainder is cultivated agricultural land. In addition to the Caribbean pine, there are lesser stands of Calabash tree (Crescentia cujete), oak (Quercus), Wild cashew tree (Curatella americana), Changunga (Byrsonima crassifolia), and the Paurotis palm (Acoelorraphe). Tree density tends to be affected by the frequency and severity of wildfires, as the Caribbean pine benefits from periodic low-intensity fires for regeneration. There are also areas of savanna with low shrubs, grasses, and reeds.

== Protected areas ==
Over 31% of the region is in an officially protected area, including:

- Chiquibul National Park, the largest national park in Belize
