= Eugenia salamensis =

Conservation status
- Least Concern (IUCN 3.1)

Scientific classification
- Kingdom: Plantae
- Clade: Tracheophytes
- Clade: Angiosperms
- Clade: Eudicots
- Clade: Rosids
- Order: Myrtales
- Family: Myrtaceae
- Genus: Eugenia
- Species: E. salamensis

Binomial name
- Eugenia salamensis Donn.Sm.

Synonyms
- Eugenia mexiae Standl.; Eugenia salamensis var. rensoniana (Standl.) McVaugh; Eugenia tomentulosa Standl.; Psidium rensonianum Standl.

Species of plant

Eugenia salamensis is a species of plant in the family Myrtaceae. It is a shrub or tree native to Costa Rica, El Salvador, Guatemala, Honduras, Nicaragua, and western Mexico.
