= Sipacate-Naranjo National Park =

National park in Escuintla, Guatemala

- IUCN category IV (habitat/species management area)
- Location within Guatemala
- Location: Escuintla, Guatemala
- Coordinates: 13°55′12″N 91°05′11″W
- Length: 20 km (12 mi)
- Width: 1 km (0.62 mi)
- Area: 20 km^{2} (7.7 sq mi)
- Elevation: 1 m (3.3 ft)
- Established: Acuerdo Gubernativo 06-09-69
- Visitors: allowed
- Operator: CONAP

Sipacate-Naranjo National Park is located along the Pacific coast of Escuintla in Guatemala (13.919955°N 91.086473°W). The park includes mangrove forests, lagoons and sandy beaches and covers an area of 20 km long and 1 km wide, stretching between the coastal towns of Sipacate and El Naranjo.

Mangrove species found in the park are white mangrove (Laguncularia racemosa), black mangrove (Avicennia nitida, Avicennia germinans) and several Rhizophora species, including the red mangrove (Rhizophora mangle). Transitional tree species include the Mexican palmetto (Sabal mexicana) and the guiana chestnut (Pachira aquatica).

The park's beaches are breeding areas where several endangered turtle species lay their eggs, including the olive ridley (Lepidochelys olivacea), green turtle (Chelonia mydas), leatherback turtle (Dermochelys coriacea), and hawksbill turtle (Eretmochelys imbricata). Other reptiles found in the park are iguanas, and freshwater turtles.

Over 90 bird species -both migratory and resident- have been reported, including a large nesting heron population (Ardeidae), cormorants (Phalacrocoracidae), pelicans (Pelecanidae), ibises (Threskiornithidae), plovers, dotterels, lapwings (Charadriidae) and gull species (Laridae). Bird species of special concern found in the park but which may be under threat in Guatemala, are: Pied-billed Grebe (Podilymbus podiceps), brown pelican (Pelecanus occidentalis), Great White Egret (Ardea alba), Snowy Egret (Egretta thula), Little Blue Heron Egretta caerulea Tricolored Heron (Egretta tricolor), Green Heron (Butorides virescens), Yellow-crowned Night Heron (Nyctanassa violacea), Boat-billed Heron (Cochlearius cochlearius), Roseate Spoonbill (Platalea ajaja), Wood Stork (Mycteria americana), Black-necked Stilt (Himantopus mexicanus), and Least Tern (Sterna antillarum).
