= Mayan Corridor mangroves =

Ecoregion (WWF)

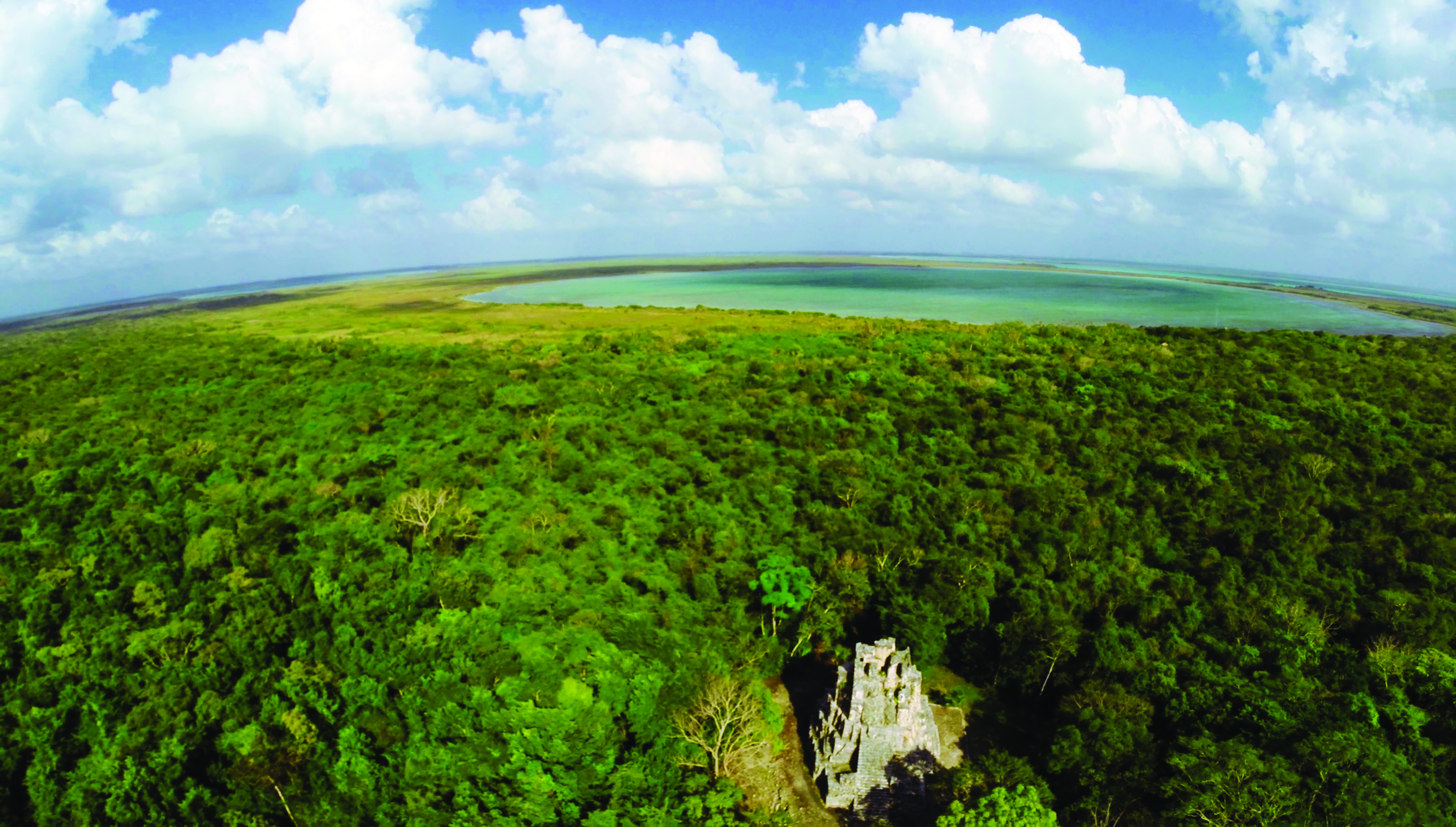
- Sian Ka'an Biosphere Reserve

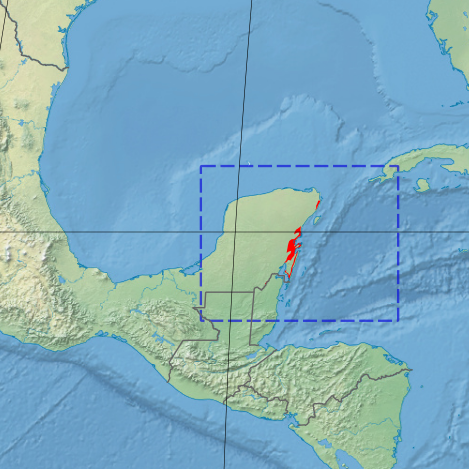
- Ecoregion territory (in red)

Ecology
- Realm: Neotropic
- Biome: Mangroves

Geography
- Area: 4,144 km^{2} (1,600 mi^{2})
- Countries: Mexico; Belize
- Coordinates: 19.9°N 87.5°W

The Mayan Corridor mangroves ecoregion (WWF ID: NT1421) covers the mangrove habitats along the Caribbean Sea coast of the state of Quintana Roo in southern Mexico and a narrow strip on the north of Belize. The region is named for the Maya Civilization archeological sites along the coast. Biodiversity in the area is high due to the interactions of different environments: coastal lagoons, river estuaries, coral reefs, and barrier beaches. The ecoregion supports Mexico's largest population of crocodiles (Crocodylus moreletii).

== Location and description ==
Mangroves cover most of the east-facing coast of Yucatan, from Cancun in the north to the east side of Chetumal Bay in the south on the border with Belize. The mangroves generally extend only a few kilometers inland from the lagoons and river deltas they surround. The ecoregion immediately inland of the Mayan Corridor mangroves is the Yucatán moist forests ecoregion.

In the north, there is a 50 km stretch of mangroves from Cancun to the town of Playa del Carmen, opposite the island of Cozumel. Further south are the coastal lagoons of Sian Ka'an Biosphere Reserve, around which are 23 archeological sites of the Maya civilization. This mangrove area extends along lagoons behind coastal dunes all the way south to the border with Belize.

== Climate ==
The climate of the ecoregion is Tropical savanna climate - dry winter (Köppen climate classification (Aw)). This climate is characterized by relatively even temperatures throughout the year, and a pronounced dry season. The driest month has less than 60 mm of precipitation, and is drier than the average month. Average annual precipitation in the ecoregion is 1,600 mm/year.

== Flora and fauna ==
Mangrove trees in the ecoregion are characteristically red mangrove (Rhizophora mangle), white mangrove (Laguncularia racemosa), Black mangrove (Avicennia germinans), and button mangrove (Conocarpus erectus). Also present are 'pygmy mangrove' that includes swamp sawgrass (Cladium mariscus) and spikerushes (Eleocharis cellulosa).

There have been 96 species of mammals recorded in the area, including the jaguar (Panthera onca), puma (Felis concolor), ocelot (Leopardus pardalis), and manatee (Trichechus manatus).

== Protected areas ==
Officially protected areas in this ecoregion includes:

- Sian Ka'an Biosphere Reserve
