= Tropical and subtropical coniferous forests =

Tropical forest habitat type

Extent of Tropical and subtropical coniferous forest regions

Tropical and subtropical coniferous forests are a tropical forest habitat type defined by the World Wide Fund for Nature. These forests are found predominantly in North and Central America and experience low levels of precipitation and moderate variability in temperature. Tropical and subtropical coniferous forests are characterized by diverse species of conifers, whose needles are adapted to deal with the variable climatic conditions. Most tropical and subtropical coniferous forest ecoregions are found in the Nearctic and Neotropical realms, from Mexico to Nicaragua and on the Greater Antilles, Bahamas, and Bermuda. Other tropical and subtropical coniferous forests ecoregions occur in Asia. Mexico harbors the world's richest and most complex subtropical coniferous forests. The conifer forests of the Greater Antilles contain many endemics and relictual taxa.

Many migratory birds and butterflies spend winter in tropical and subtropical conifer forests. This biome features a thick, closed canopy which blocks light to the floor and allows little underbrush. As a result, the ground is often covered with fungi and ferns. Shrubs and small trees compose a diverse understory.

== Tropical and subtropical coniferous forests ecoregions ==
Indomalayan tropical and subtropical coniferous forests ecoregions
Himalayan subtropical pine forests	Bhutan, India, Nepal, Pakistan
Luzon tropical pine forests	Philippines
Northeast India–Myanmar pine forests	Myanmar, India
Sumatran tropical pine forests	Indonesia

Neotropical tropical and subtropical coniferous forests ecoregions
Bahamian pineyards	The Bahamas
Belizian pine forests	Belize
Central American pine–oak forests	El Salvador, Guatemala, Honduras, Mexico, Nicaragua
Cuban pine forests	Cuba
Hispaniolan pine forests	Haiti, Dominican Republic
Miskito pine forests	Honduras, Nicaragua
Sierra de la Laguna pine–oak forests	Mexico
Sierra Madre de Oaxaca pine–oak forests	Mexico
Sierra Madre del Sur pine–oak forests	Mexico
Trans-Mexican Volcanic Belt pine–oak forests	Mexico

Nearctic tropical and subtropical coniferous forests ecoregions
Bermuda subtropical conifer forests	Bermuda

== See also ==
- Forest
- Trees of the world
- Arid Forest Research Institute (AFRI)
