= Manabí mangroves =

Ecoregion along the Pacific coast of Ecuador

Manabí mangroves (NT1418)
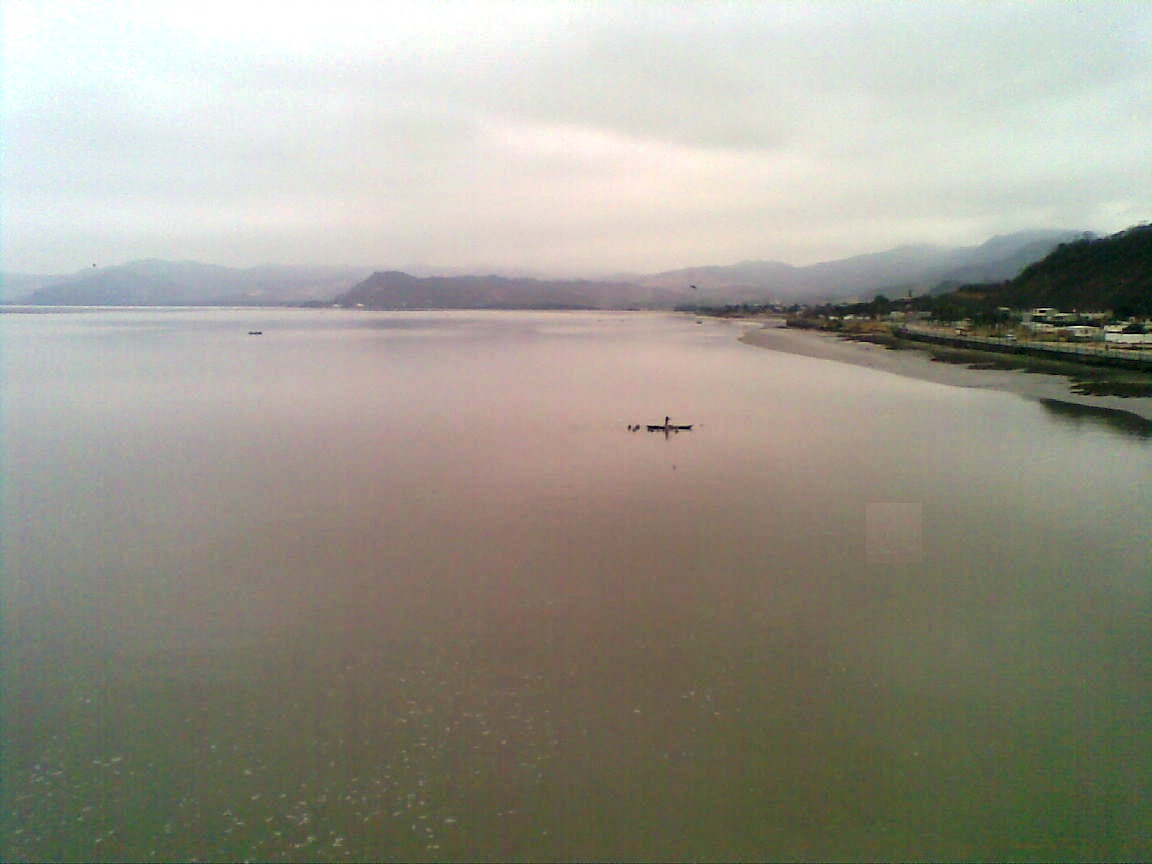
- Mouth of the Chone River

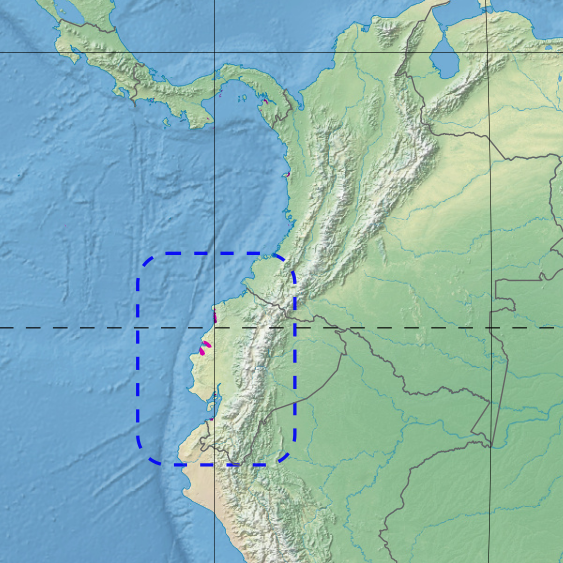
- Ecoregion territory (in purple)

Ecology
- Realm: Neotropical
- Biome: Mangroves

Geography
- Area: 1,000 km^{2} (390 sq mi)
- Countries: Ecuador
- Coordinates: 0.650°S 80.370°W

The Manabí mangroves (NT1418) is an ecoregion along the Pacific coast of Ecuador. The mangroves serve important functions in the marine and terrestrial ecology. They have been severely degraded and fragmented, particularly in the northern region. Construction of shrimp farms caused much damage in the past, but is now banned. Sedimentation caused by overgrazing in higher lands is an issue, as are human activities such as port and highway construction, urbanization, waste disposal and so on.

== Geography ==
=== Location ===
The mangroves are found along the coast of Ecuador and cover an area of 400 square miles (1,000 km^{2}). There are two sub-regions. The Cojimíes sub-region in Esmeraldas Province lies between the Muisne River to the north and the town of Pedernales to the south. It transitions into the Western Ecuador moist forests ecoregion to the east. It contains a section around Muisne that fringes the Ensenada de Mompiche, and further south a larger section of mangroves around the estuary of the Mache River on the border between Esmeraldas and Manabí provinces.

Further south, the Chone sub-region in Manabí Province lies between the town of Bahía de Caráquez and the Chone River to the north and the Portoviejo River to the south. The mangroves transition into the Ecuadorian dry forests ecoregion to the east. The sub-region includes a section of mangroves around the estuary of the Chone River, and further south a section that extends inland from the coast to the south of San Clemente along the floodplain of the Portoviejo River.

=== Terrain ===
Tide levels fluctuate widely. The soil is swampy and unstable, with complex woody structures. Landscapes include deltas, estuaries, lakes and carbonated platforms. Some areas have high sedimentation and therefore a low shoreline, low wave energy and less estuaries. The main rivers in the Cojimíes sub-region are the Muisne River, delivering 22 cubic metres per second (780 cu ft/s), and the Cojimíes River. The main river in the Chone sub-region is the Chone River, delivering 31 cubic metres per second (1,100 cu ft/s).

=== Climate ===
Rainfall averages 1,410 millimetres (56 in) per year in the Cojimíes sub-region, and 501 millimetres (19.7 in) per year in the Chone subregion. The region is strongly influenced by the cold, dry Humboldt Current from the south meeting the warm El Niño currents in the Intertropical Convergence Zone. The result is a climate where temperatures fluctuate considerably and occasionally fall below freezing.

== Ecology ==
The ecoregion is in the neotropical realm, in the mangroves biome. It is part of the Panama Bight Mangroves, a Global ecoregion, that consists of the Gulf of Panama mangroves, Esmeraldas–Pacific Colombia mangroves, Manabí mangroves and Gulf of Guayaquil–Tumbes mangroves. The complex mangrove forests protect the coast from sea swells and winds, clear salt from the sea breezes and are home to a rich variety of marine and freshwater fauna. The El Niño periodically disrupts the environment.

=== Flora ===
The mangroves grow in border, strip and coastal formations. There are relatively few species of flora. In the wetter zones where there is low sedimentation the main species are black mangrove (Avicennia germinans), red mangrove (Rhizophora mangle) and mangle caballero (Rhizophora harrisonii). Further inland other species include the button mangrove (Conocarpus erectus), white mangrove (Laguncularia racemosa) and tea mangrove (Pelliciera rhizophorae). The mangroves also host red algae and epiphytes such as Orchidaceaes, Bromeliaceae, Cactus and mosses. The tea mangrove (Pelliciera rhizophorae) is endemic to the Chone sub-region.

=== Fauna ===
The mangroves do not have high levels of endemism, but in any given area have many different species. They are habitats for mammals, birds, reptiles, mollusks, crustaceans and fish. The mangrove detritus is converted to protein by microscopic organisms, by worms such as nematodes, polychaetes and oligochaeta, and by amphipoda, bivalvia and gastropoda. Fish and shrimp migrate through the mangroves during their reproductive cycles. Fish that feed on organic detritus in turn provide food to larger land and water carnivores. There are many fish of the genus Mugil and many crustaceans of the family Penaeidae.

Mammals and birds move between the mangroves and the terra firme, and from one patch of mangroves to another along the coast. Mammals include crab-eating raccoon (Procyon cancrivorus), jaguar (Panthera onca), mantled howler (Alouatta palliata) and white-headed capuchin (Cebus capucinus). Reptiles include the green iguana (Iguana iguana). There are 42 birds species including Columbina dove species, brown pelican (Pelecanus occidentalis) and magnificent frigatebird (Fregata magnificens). The mangrove finch (Camarhynchus heliobates) is seriously endangered.

== Status ==
The World Wide Fund for Nature gives the ecoregion the status "Critical/Endangered". 38% of the two mangrove sub-regions is in critical condition and suffers from high levels of fragmentation. The government enacted a ban on building shrimp farms in or near mangroves in 1985. However, development of shrimp farms and conversion of land to pasturage in adjacent areas has affected the mangroves in the Cojimíes sub-region. Sedimentation in the rivers due to over-grazing on higher lands is an issue in the Chone sub-region. Other impacts come from urbanization, highway and port construction, drainage works and waste.

The mangroves of the Cojimíes sub-region are seriously fragmented. As of 1999 an area of 1,162 hectares (2,870 acres) of the original mangroves had been lost, while shrimp farms now covered 668 hectares (1,650 acres). However, in the Chone subregion the mangroves had expanded by 903 hectares (2,230 acres) and the shrimp farms had been reduced in size by 285 hectares (700 acres). This may be caused in part by the increase of sedimentation associated with the shrimp farms, creating more shallow water to be colonized by mangroves.

Although the National System of Protected Areas in 1989 declared the Manabí mangroves a priority, they are not covered by any protected area. Some NGOs are working on research and improved environmental management. The Congal Biomarine Station is a 210 hectares (520 acres) reserve operated by a private non-profit organization beside the Muisne River estuary that protects the mangrove wetlands. The mangroves had been heavily affected by aquaculture and over-extraction of natural resources. Many people depended on shrimp farms, and lost their livings when an exotic viral disease destroyed the shrimps. The station attempts to develop community-based sustainable use of the reserve's resource.

== Sources ==
- Carrera, Paola U.; Jiménez, Pilar G.; Viteri, Xavier, Northern South America: Coastal Ecuador, WWF: World Wide Fund for Nature
- Congal Biomarine Station, Jatun Sacha Foundation
- Panama Bight Mangroves, WWF Global
- WildFinder, WWF: World Wildlife Fund
