= South American Pacific mangroves =

Ecoregion along the Pacific coast of Panama, Colombia, Ecuador and Peru

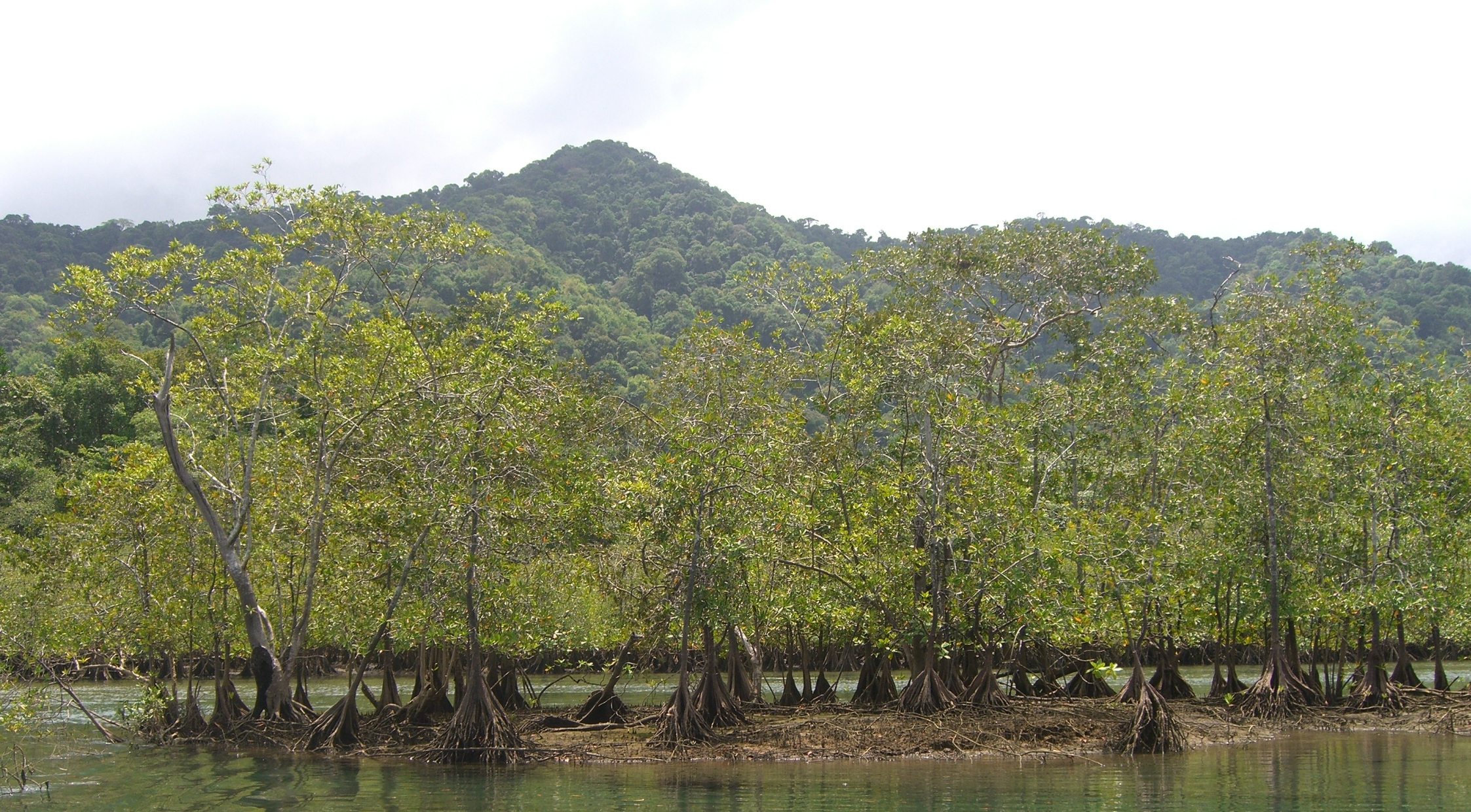
- Mangroves in front of the Utría National Park in Colombia

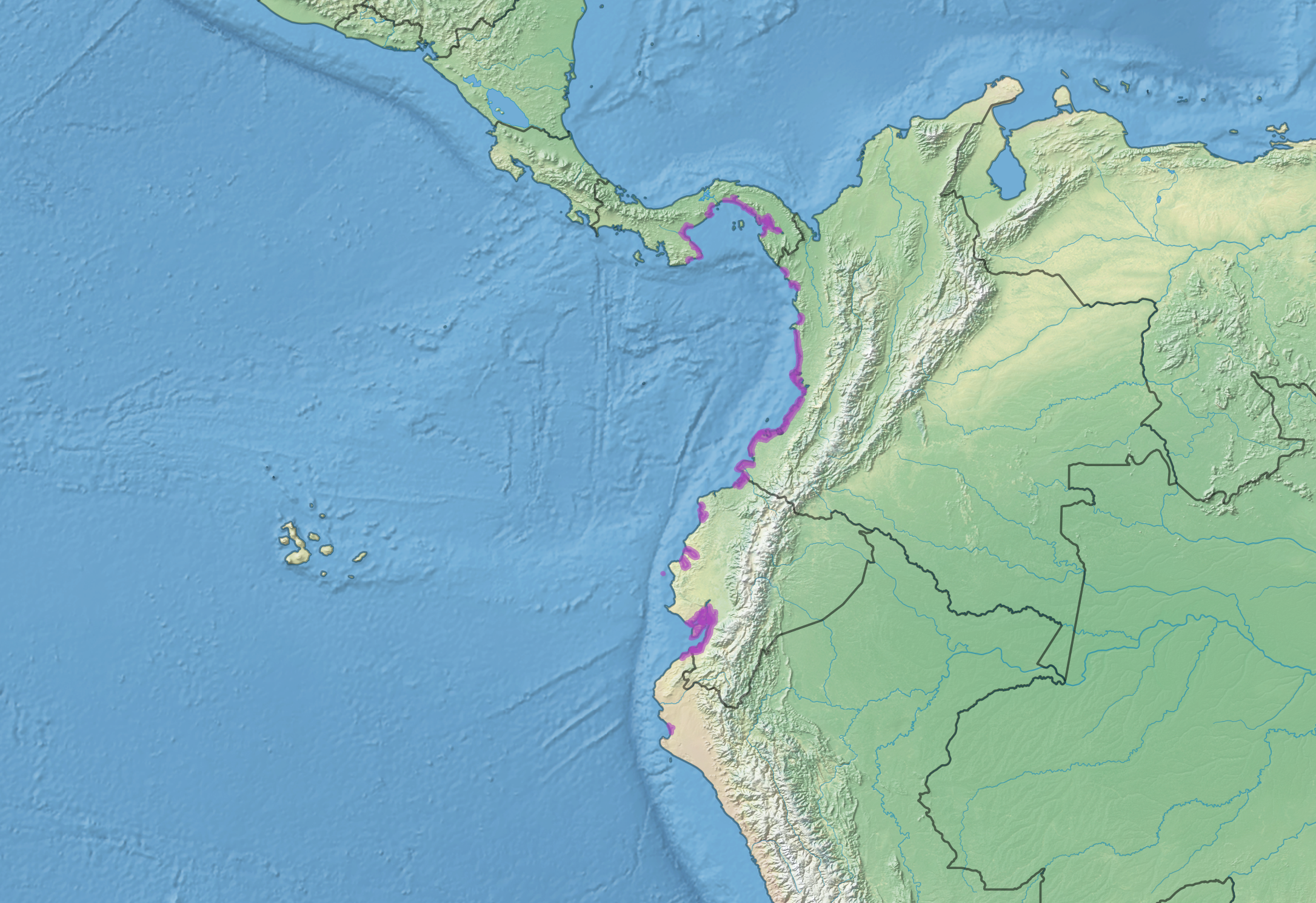
- Map of the South American Pacific mangroves (purple)

Ecology
- Realm: Neotropical
- Biome: Mangroves

Geography
- Area: 34,187 km^{2} (13,200 mi^{2})
- Countries: Panama, Colombia, Ecuador, Peru
- Coordinates: 2.612°N 78.265°W
- Climate type: Af (equatorial; fully humid)

The South American Pacific mangroves, or Panama Bight mangroves, is an ecoregion along the Pacific coast of Panama, Colombia, Ecuador and Peru.

== Geography ==
=== Location ===
Location in Colombia

The South American Pacific mangroves ecoregion is found along the southern coast of Panama, extensive stretches of the Pacific coast of Colombia, sections of the Pacific coast of Ecuador, particularly around the estuary of the Guayas River, and in two small stretches along the northern coast of Peru.

The Panama Bight Mangroves, a Global ecoregion, consists of the Gulf of Panama mangroves, Esmeraldas–Pacific Colombia mangroves, Manabí mangroves and Gulf of Guayaquil–Tumbes mangroves. The Gulf of Panama mangroves (NT1414) extend from the Gulf of Parita to the Bay of San Miguel. Mangroves are found along the coasts of Colombia and Ecuador from the Gulf of Tribugá in the north to Mompiche Bay in the south (NT1409). Mangroves are found along the coast of Manabí Province in Ecuador (NT1418). They are also found between Ecuador and Peru where many rivers empty into the Pacific and the Gulf of Guayaquil (NT1413).

In Panama the mangroves are found along the Pacific coast of the Panamanian dry forests and Isthmian–Atlantic moist forests ecoregions. Further south in Colombia the mangroves fringe the Chocó–Darién moist forests along the Pacific coast. Further south again, in Ecuador the mangroves fringe sections of the coast of the Western Ecuador moist forests, Ecuadorian dry forests and Tumbes–Piura dry forests, which extend into Peru. There is a small section of mangroves on the northern coast of the Sechura Desert.

== Terrain ==
The mangroves of the Pacific coast deltas of South American are fed by streams with steep slopes in their catchment areas, which have high levels of rainfall. These streams carry high loads of sediment. The coast is subsiding at about 0.6 millimetres (0.024 in) per year, and global warming will increase sea levels, but will probably also to increase rainfall on the Pacific coast. The fresh sediments should therefore maintain the surface elevation of the mangroves.

=== Climate ===
Rainfall may exceed 10,000 millimetres (390 in) annually on the northern Pacific coast of Colombia, and the rivers discharge high volumes of water. Destructive tropical cyclones are very rare, so the mangroves avoid both the destructive effects of storms and the benefits from deposits of marine sediment. At a sample location at coordinates 2.25°N 78.75°W the Köppen climate classification is Af (equatorial; fully humid). Mean temperatures vary from 25.2 °C (77.4 °F) in November to 26.4 °C (79.5 °F) in April. Total annual rainfall is about 3,600 millimetres (140 in). Monthly rainfall ranges from 198.4 millimetres (7.81 in) in August to 409.8 millimetres (16.13 in) in May.

== Ecology ==
The ecoregion is in the Neotropical realm, in the mangroves biome. Mangroves extend along the Pacific coast south to 5°32' at the estuary of the Piura River in the north of Peru. South of that the cold Humboldt Current causes high soil salinity and very arid conditions, with hardly any fresh water streams. This is an inhospitable environment for mangroves, particularly during El Niño years.

=== Flora ===
49 families of vascular plants have been identified in the Pacific coast mangroves, with 135 genera and 222 species. A 2014 book proposed a distinction between the Chocoan and Equatorial-Pacific mangrove forests. Endemic species such as Avicennia tonduzi and Avicennia bicolor are found in the Pacific mangroves. More than 70% of Colombia's mangroves grow on the Pacific coast. They form tall, well-structured forests with trees up to 30 metres (98 ft) high. The southernmost stands of mangroves in the Virrila and Piura estuaries hold only black mangroves (Avicennia germinans). Between 1987 and 2014 these stands have grown substantially, but have not spread along the coast.

=== Fauna ===
Endangered birds include the white-winged guan (Penelope albipennis). Endangered mammals include the black-headed spider monkey (Ateles fusciceps), Geoffroy's spider monkey (Ateles geoffroyi) and equatorial dog-faced bat (Molossops aequatorianus). Endangered reptiles include the green sea turtle (Chelonia mydas) and hawksbill sea turtle (Eretmochelys imbricata).

== Status ==
In Ecuador about 40,000 hectares (99,000 acres) of mangroves were lost in the 1980s and early 1990s due to unsustainable shrimp pond development. Since then the mangroves have been slowly recovering, and seem stable. Part of the ecoregion is protected by the Barro Colorado Island Natural Monument.

== Sources ==
- Carlos Borda, "Northern South America: Northern Colombia", World Wide Fund for Nature
- Carrera, Paola U.; Jiménez, Pilar G.; Viteri, Xavier, "Northern South America: Coastal Ecuador", World Wide Fund for Nature
- Juan Carlos Riveros Salcedo, "Western South America: Ecuador and Peru (NT1413)", World Wide Fund for Nature
- Lacerda, Luiz Drude de (26 March 2002), Mangrove Ecosystems: Function and Management, Springer Science & Business Media, ISBN 978-3-540-42208-2
- Miloslavich, Patricia; Klein, Eduardo; Díaz, Juan M.; Hernández, Cristián E.; Bigatti, Gregorio; Campos, Lucia; et al. (31 January 2011), "Marine Biodiversity in the Atlantic and Pacific Coasts of South America: Knowledge and Gaps", PLOS ONE, 6 (1) e14631, Bibcode:2011PLoSO...614631M, doi:10.1371/journal.pone.0014631, PMC 3031619, PMID 21304960
- "Panama Bight Mangroves", WWF Global, archived from the original on 2017-07-02
- Serena Fortuna (2007), "8: South America", The world's mangroves 1980-2005, Food and Agriculture Organization, ISBN 978-92-5-105856-5
- "South American Pacific mangroves", Global Species, Myers Enterprises II
- Tognetti, Sylivia; Burdette, Christine, "Central America: Pacific coast of Panama", World Wide Fund for Nature
- Ward, Raymond D.; Friess, Daniel A.; Day, Richard H.; MacKenzie, Richard A. (25 April 2016), "Impacts of climate change on mangrove ecosystems: a region by region overview" (PDF), Ecosystem Health and Sustainability, 2 (4): e01211, doi:10.1002/ehs2.1211
- "WildFinder", World Wildlife Fund
- Xavier Cornejo, ed. (2014), Plants of the South American Pacific Mangrove Swamps (Colombia, Ecuador, Peru), EduQuil, ISBN 978-9942-13-667-1
