= Congal Biomarine Station =

Nature reserve in Ecuador

- Location: Southwestern Esmeraldas Province, near Muisne, Ecuador
- Established: 2000
- Website: Official website

The Congal Biomarine Station is a protected nature reserve created in 2000 and is located in southwestern Esmeraldas Province, close to the town of Muisne in northwestern Ecuador. The Congal Reserve is managed by the Jatun Sacha Foundation and features beach, estuarine, mangrove, wetlands and humid tropical forest habitats, accounting for the region's high biodiversity and local endemism. The station was founded by the Quiroga family in partnership with conservationist, Arlo Hemphill.

== Geographic region ==
The Reserve is part of the Western Ecuador Chocó-Darién biogeographical region, considered one world's biodiversity hotspots, where less than 24.2% of original primary forest cover remains. The Chocó-Darién intact mangrove habitats are also considered among the most important in the world, providing multiple environmental and social benefits. Additionally, Congal is part of the Mangrove Wild Life Refugee of Muisne and is in the buffer zone of the Mache Chindul National Ecological Reserve. The Reserve influences over 500 square kilometres of publicly owned mangroves and was the first mangrove reserve of it kind created in the Muisne area.

The reserve is on the mainland, across the estuary of the Muisne River from the community of Muisne. The Reserve also pursues the creation of the first large coastal marine reserve in mainland Ecuador. In this area it is possible to find coral reefs, humpback whale breeding and calving waters, sea turtle nesting beaches extensive mangrove wetlands and both sandy and rocky shoreline.

== Objectives ==
The Reserve's purpose is to develop projects in the fields of coastal ecology, marine conservation, organic and environmentally friendly aquaculture, farming and forestry. These projects, once tested, may be applied in local communities to provide sources of income and to reduce the pressure on already overexploited and threatened natural resources.

== Project summary ==
Once projects have been developed and successfully tried at Congal Reserve they can be applied on the farms of interested community members. The Station's staff aims to empower local people and improve their living standards. The integration of local communities into the Station's field projects with participation from international visitors also aims to provide basic and specialized skills through proper training and awareness raising on world issues.

In order to improve living standards of the economically poor from the surrounding communities, the Station also aims to participate and improve the current health, child care, formal and informal education as well as cultural initiatives. An important aspect for the community is the teaching of English since it provides them with potential new income opportunities. The Congal Station encourages the participation of professionals in any field to participate in these and other activities for the benefit of local communities. Additionally, it looks forward to evaluating and proposing new projects that have been defined by the community as priorities for their development.

Researchers, students, professionals and volunteers participate in projects at the Congal Biomarine Reserve. Such projects include mangrove and tropical humid forest restoration, marine conservation, community outreach, management of aquaculture and forestry systems, organic farming, biological inventories and maintenance of Reserve facilities. The raising of terrestrial and aquatic wildlife species is one of the main projects being developed at Congal. This includes land crabs, agouti, fish, clam species and organic shrimp, and in the future green iguana hatchlings. Since October 2004, the Reserve has implemented a sea turtle monitoring program in order to determine their conservation status.
