= Gulf of Guayaquil–Tumbes mangroves =

Ecoregion in Peru and Ecuador

Gulf of Guayaquil–Tumbes mangroves (NT1413)
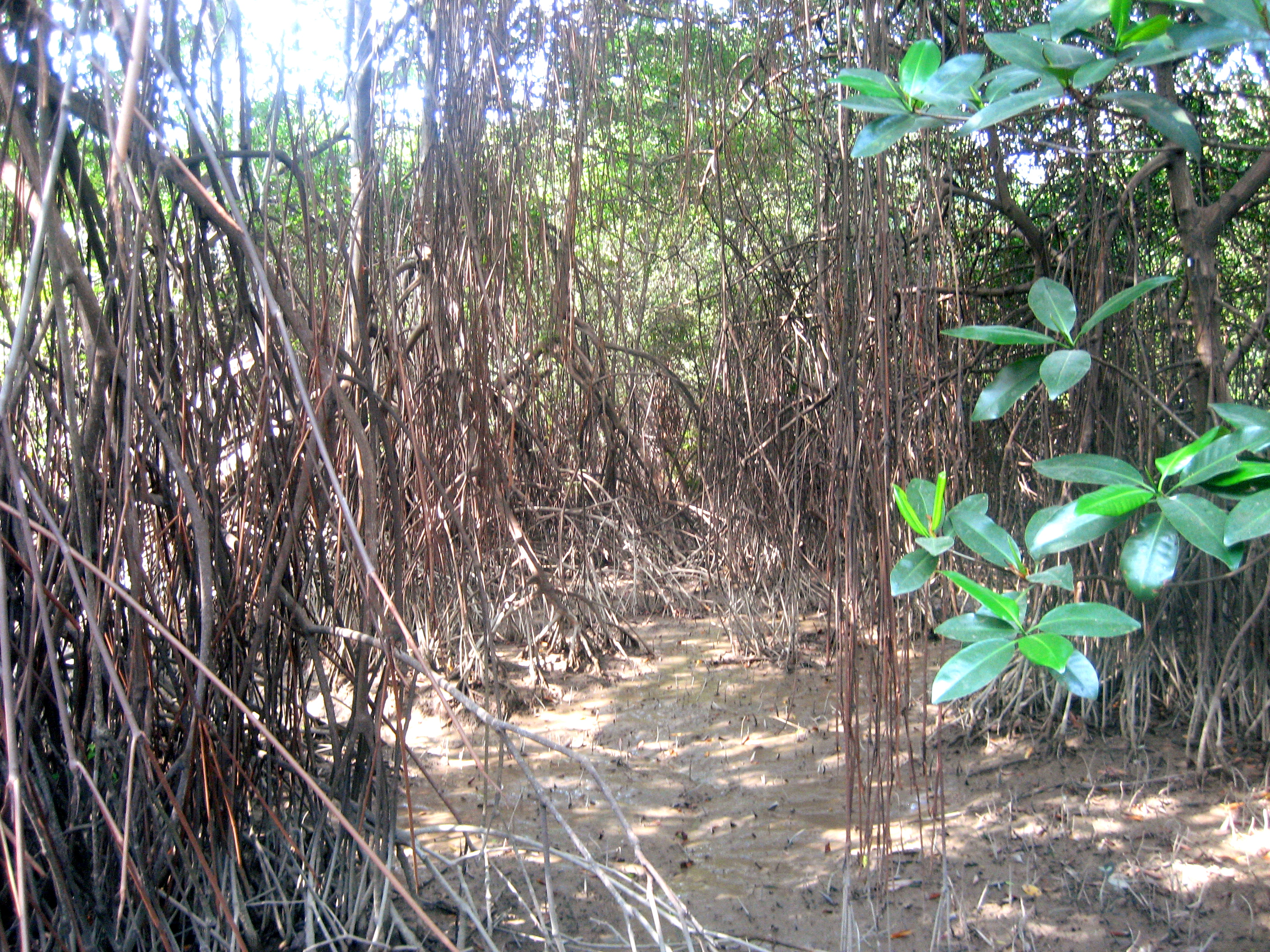
- Mangroves in the Guayaquil Historical Park

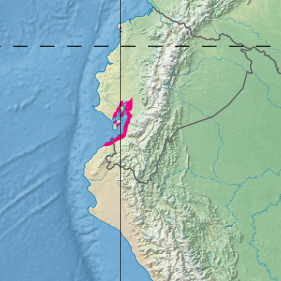
- Ecoregion territory (in red)

Ecology
- Realm: Neotropical
- Biome: Mangroves
- Borders: Ecuadorian dry forests; Tumbes–Piura dry forests; Western Ecuador moist forests

Geography
- Area: 3,400 km^{2} (1,300 mi^{2})
- Country: Ecuador; Peru
- Coordinates: 2.567°S 79.760°W

The Gulf of Guayaquil–Tumbes mangroves (NT1413) are an ecoregion located in the Gulf of Guayaquil in South America, in northern Peru and southern Ecuador. It has an area of 3,300 km^{2} (1300 sq mi).

== Location ==
The mangroves are found between Ecuador and Peru where many rivers empty into the Pacific and the Gulf of Guayaquil. They fringe the Gulf of Guayaquil and the northwestern Pacific Coast of Peru near Tumbes. They cover an area of 1,300 square miles (3,400 km^{2}). Inland the mangroves transition into areas of Ecuadorian dry forests, Western Ecuador moist forests and in the south the Tumbes–Piura dry forests, which extend into Peru.

The Gulf of Guayaquil is the largest estuary ecosystem on South America's Pacific coast. The flat land and high tides result in salt water moving far up the gulf. Average annual rainfall is 600 millimetres (24 in), but in some years may be as much as 3,800 millimetres (150 in).

== Ecology ==
The ecoregion is part of the Panama Bight Mangroves, a Global ecoregion, which contains the Gulf of Panama mangroves, Esmeraldas–Pacific Colombia mangroves, Manabí mangroves and Gulf of Guayaquil–Tumbes mangroves.

=== Flora ===
The ecoregion contains plant formations of mangrove (Rhizophora spp.) forest that are adapted to permanently flooded conditions and the resulting environments, which offer little available oxygen.

The Tumbes River is the southern limit for some mangrove species.

=== Fauna ===
There are dozens of mammal and reptile species, including the American crocodile (Crocodylus acutus) at its southern limit. There are more than 40 species of birds including the Neotropic cormorant (Phalacrocorax brasilianus), white-necked heron (Ardea pacifica), great egret (Ardea alba), American white ibis (Eudocimus albus), roseate spoonbill (Platalea ajaja), osprey (Pandion haliaetus), white-winged guan (Penelope albipennis) and horned screamer (Anhima cornuta).

== Population ==
The Mangroves in this region have been home to people since pre-Spanish colonization. Mangroves support many traditional ways of life and contain concentrated cultural populations of both Afro-Ecuadorians and Indigenous peoples, both described as the "Ancestral Peoples of the Mangrove Ecosystem." Traditional activities include artisanal fishing, crabbing, and cockle (Anadara tuberculosa and A. similis) gathering, as well as mangrove wood harvest and historically some charcoal production. In this region gathering Ucidess Occidentails or the red mangrove crab is an important economic activity for local people and common source of food.

In 1999, in an effort to promote sustainable harvest and reduce land conflict by defining resource rights, the government of Ecuador began granting mangrove concessions known as Mangrove Sustainable Use and Custody Agreements. These concessions, called custodias, gave certain groups explicit rights to fish within an allocated area. They also placed responsibility for stewardship and management on the local people.

In Ecuador mangroves have also had ties with drug trade and other criminal activity because the dense tree cover and difficult maneuverability provide concealment. These activities limit mangrove residents' access to mangrove lands and traditional artisanal fishing grounds. This vulnerability to displacement, combined with shrinking resources, creates growing conflict among mangrove stakeholders. In recent years, mangrove communities have increased activism against mangrove deforestation and shrimp farming.

== Status ==
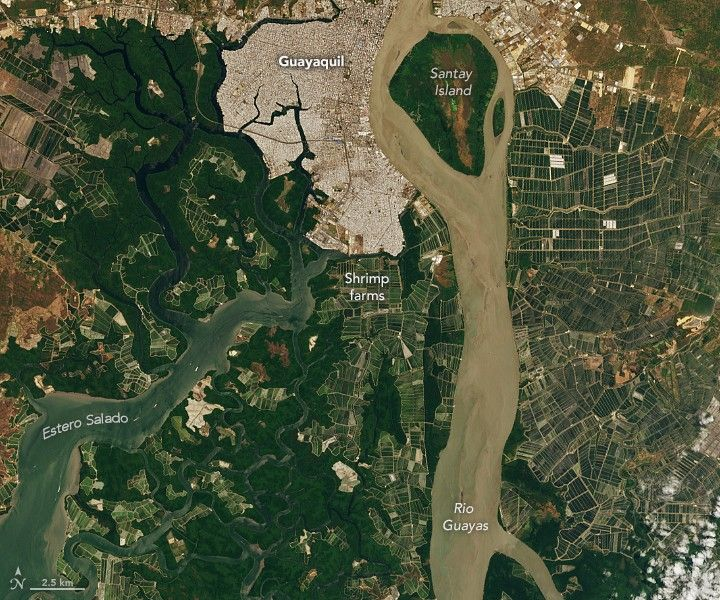
2024 aerial view of Guayaquil, shrimp farms labeled

As the largest exporter of white-leg shrimp in the world, Ecuador has seen a dramatic decrease in its mangrove forests, with over 70 percent of the original mangroves in the Gulf of Guayaquil deforested mostly for shrimp farming ponds. Mangrove forests reduce 10 times more carbon than mature tropical forests, making them a critical ecosystem for mitigating rising Co2 levels. This large-scale deforestation affects the shorelines in these areas as it leaves them vulnerable to storms and storm surges while also undermining efforts to mitigate climate change.

The deforestation of mangrove forests not only threatens tropical ecosystems in the Ecuadorian Gulf of Guayaquil, but also can have detrimental impacts on the local mangrove-dependent communities, as mangrove fish and shellfish products provide essential sources of income for coastal communities. To help mitigate these issues, in 2008, Ecuador became the first nation in the world to pass a bill granting constitutional rights to nature, ensuring the continuation of Ecuador's natural spaces and ecosystems.

== Sources ==
- "Gulf of Guayaquil-Tumbes mangroves (NT1413)", National Geographic, archived from the original on 2010-03-08
- Juan Carlos Riveros Salcedo, "Western South America: Ecuador and Peru (NT1413)", World Wide Fund for Nature
- Panama Bight Mangroves, WWF Global
- Serena Fortuna (2007), "8: South America", The world's mangroves 1980-2005, Food and Agriculture Organization, ISBN 978-92-5-105856-5
- "WildFinder", World Wildlife Fund
- Karáth, K. (2022). The high price of cheap shrimp. Retrieved 3–15–26
- NOAA. (2019). Coastal Blue Carbon. Retrieved 3–15–26
- Blankespoor, B.; Dasgupta, S.; Lange, G. M. (2017). "Mangroves as a protection from storm surges in a changing climate". Ambio. 46 (4): 478–491. Bibcode:2017Ambio..46..478B. doi:10.1007/s13280-016-0838-x. PMC 5385662. PMID 27787668.
- Client-Earth Communications. (2023). The hidden cost of farmed shrimp from Ecuador. Retrieved 3–15–26
- McCarthy, S. (2022). New agreement sets Ecuador on a path to end habitat conversion from shrimp farming | press releases | WWF. Retrieved 3–15–26
- Oliver, S. (2024). Ecuador's rights of nature: A new legal momentum? Retrieved 3–15–26
- Treviño, Melva; Murillo-Sandoval, Paulo J. (2021). "Uneven consequences: Gendered impacts of shrimp aquaculture development on mangrove dependent communities". Ocean and Coastal Management. 210 105688. Bibcode:2021OCM...21005688T. doi:10.1016/j.ocecoaman.2021.105688.
- Leslie Von Pless (2023). Ecuador's Crabbers and the muddy work of saving mangroves. Retrieved 3–15–26
- Hamilton, S. E. (2011). The Impact of Shrimp Farming on Mangrove Ecosystems and Local Livelihoods Along the Pacific Coast of Ecuador. Retrieved 3–15–26
- Morocho, Ramiro; González, Ivonne; Ferreira, Tiago Osorio; Otero, Xosé Luis (2022). "Mangrove Forests in Ecuador: A Two-Decade Analysis". Forests. 13 (5): 656. Bibcode:2022Fore...13..656M. doi:10.3390/f13050656.
