= Mache River =

River in Ecuador

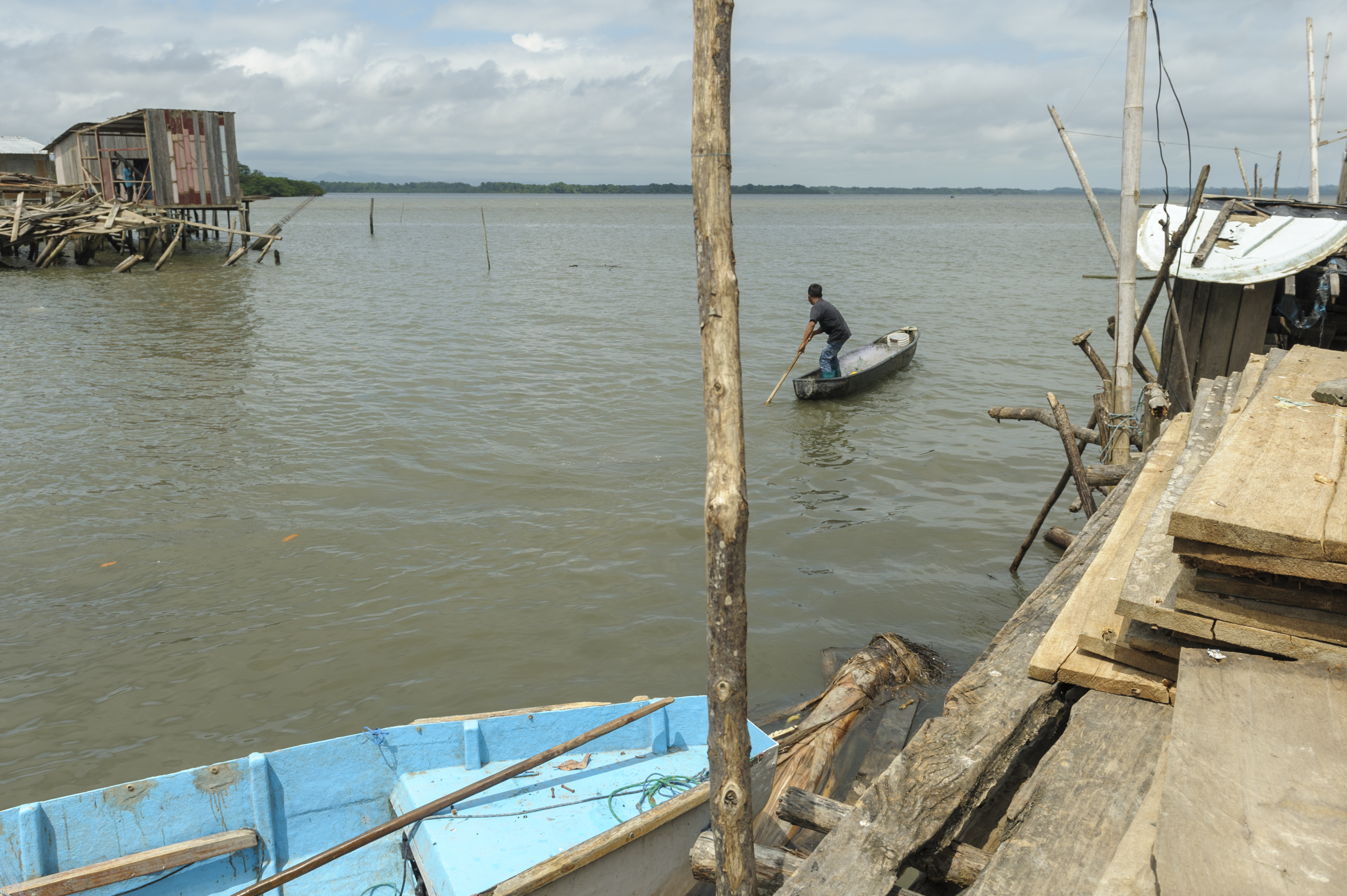
- Near the mouth of the river

- Mouth location in Ecuador

Location
- Country: Ecuador

Physical characteristics
- Mouth
  - coordinates: 0°15′40″N 79°56′39″W

The Mache River is a river that enters the Pacific Ocean through the Cojimies Estuary on the north coast of Ecuador.

== Location ==
The sources of the river are protected by the 119,172 hectares (294,480 acres) Mache-Chindul Ecological Reserve, which covers the Mache Chindul mountain range. The Mache River is one of the main tributaries of the Cojimies Estuary. Seven rivers flow into the estuary, but their flows have been drastically reduced and only four now flow year round. The river is deflected to the north by the Cojimíes peninsula before entering the Pacific. The peninsula encloses a bay fringed with mangroves, with sandbars forming at its mouth.

== Environment ==
The estuary, on the border between Esmeraldas and Manabí provinces, contains a large section of mangroves in the Manabí mangroves ecoregion. There has been extensive excavation of shrimp ponds in the salt marshes and mangroves of the bay. There has been a serious decline in fish such as chame (Dormitator latifrons) and cockles, important sources of food and income for the local people. The two barrier islands at the mouth of the estuary are nesting areas for birds and turtles, and have ecotourism potential.

== See also ==
- List of rivers of Ecuador

== Sources ==
- Bird, Eric (25 February 2010), Encyclopedia of the World's Coastal Landforms, Springer Science & Business Media, ISBN 978-1-4020-8638-0
- Reserva Ecologica Mache Chindul (in Spanish), Ministerio del Ambiente
- The Cojimies Estuary in Ecuador (PDF), USAID
- WildFinder, WWF: World Wildlife Fund
