= Ensenada de Mompiche =

Bay in Ecuador

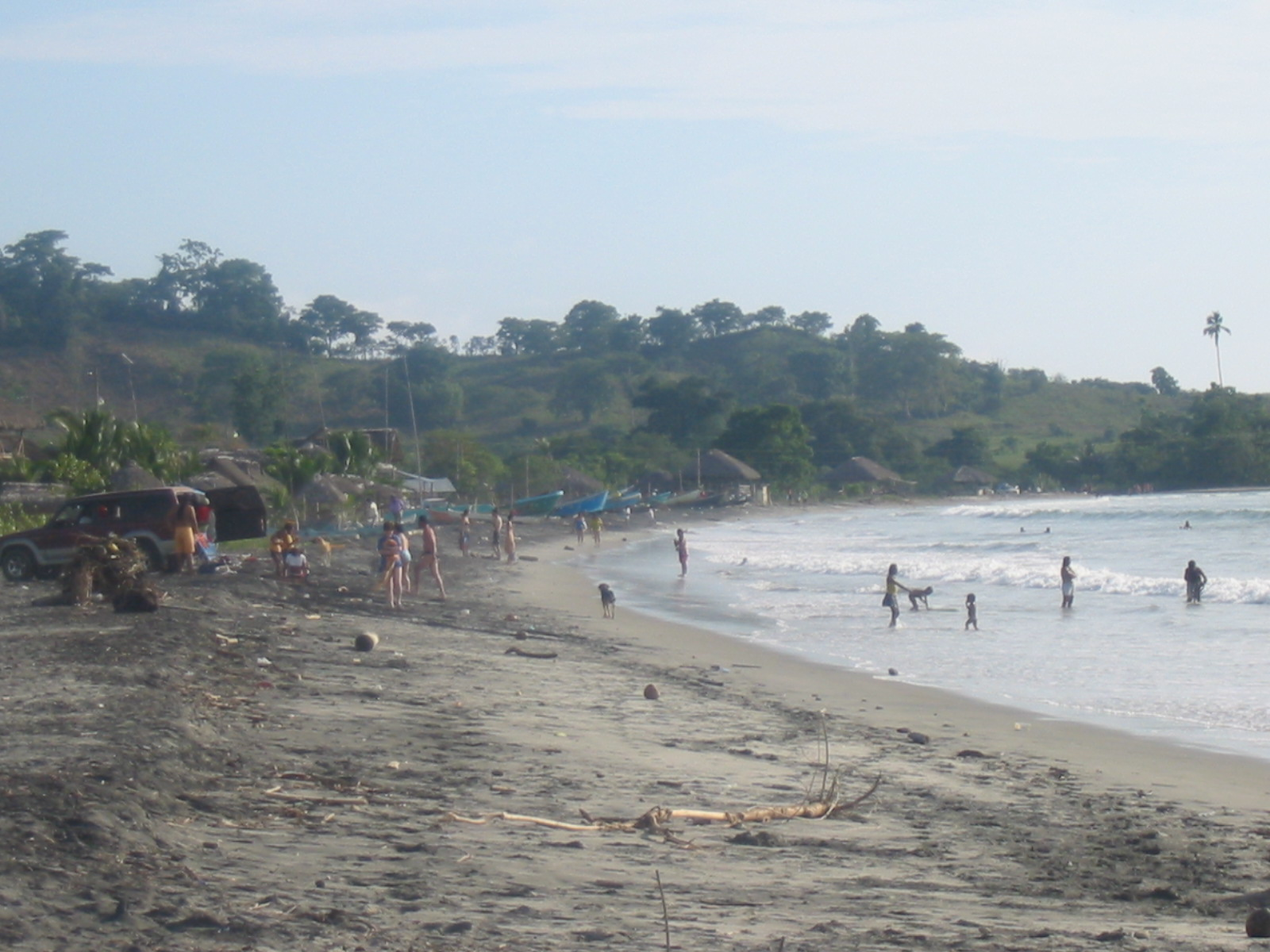
- Mompiche Beach

- Location in Ecuador
- Location: Esmeraldas Province
- Coordinates: 0.579098°N 80.022636°W
- Ocean/sea sources: Pacific Ocean
- Basin countries: Ecuador

The Ensenada de Mompiche (Mompiche Bay) is a bay on the Pacific coast of northern Ecuador.

The bay is in the Esmeraldas Province. Parts of the bay are fringed by mangroves of the Manabí mangroves ecoregion. The low-keyed Muisne resort is in the northern part of the bay, on a 7 kilometres (4.3 mi) sand bar among the mangroves of the Muisne River estuary. It may be reached by ferry across the Muisne River from the small town of El Relleno.

Mompiche village at the south of the bay can be reached by a 6 kilometres (3.7 mi) potholed road from the Via del Pacifico (Ecuador Highway 15). Its accessibility has led to small hotels and hostels being built, primarily for low-income surfers. The broad Mompiche Beach is almost 6 kilometres (3.7 mi) long and has fine white/gold sand. It extends north from the small fishing village of Mompiche to the river estuary at Muisne. It is a popular place for surfing, and ecotourism is also popular. The Mache Chindul Ecological Reserve, which contains mangroves and dry forests, is near to the beach.

== Sources ==
- National Geospatial-Intelligence Agency, Ensenada de Mompiche: Ecuador
- Humphreys, Sara; Küffner, Stephan (20 September 2016), The Rough Guide to Ecuador & the Galápagos Islands, Rough Guides, ISBN 978-0-241-29160-3
- "Mompiche Beach", Ecuador Beaches
- "Muisne", Rough Guides
- WildFinder, WWF: World Wildlife Fund
