= Western Ecuador moist forests =

Ecoregion in Ecuador and Colombia

Western Ecuador Moist Forests (NT0178)
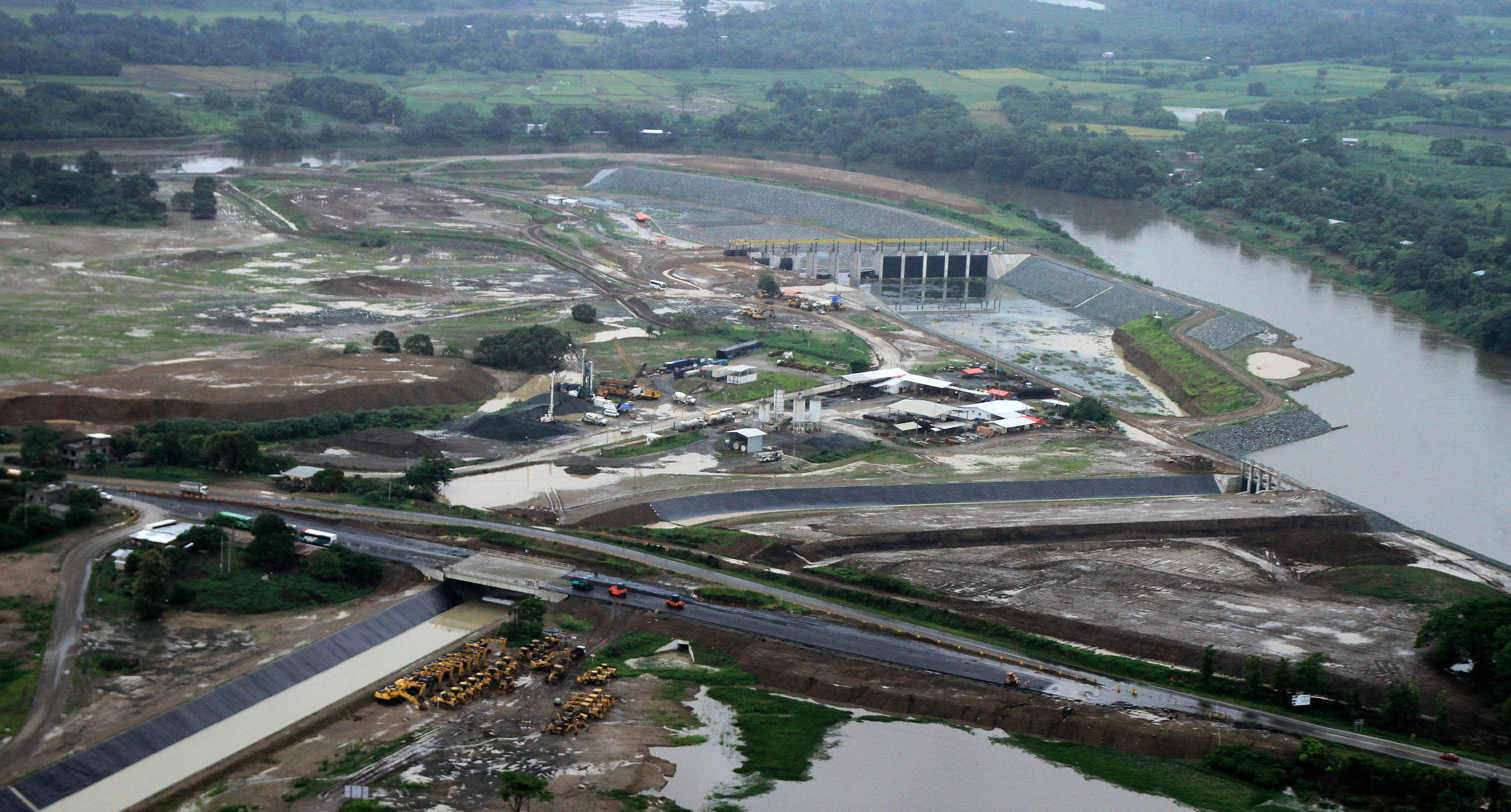
- Daule-Vinces Transfer System

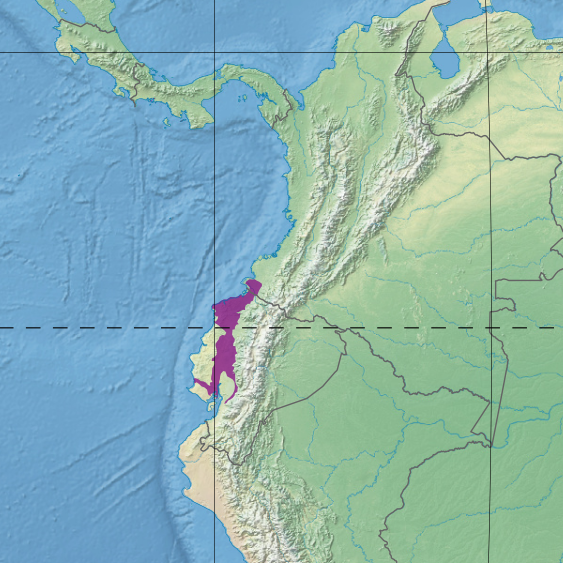
- Ecoregion territory (in purple)

Ecology
- Realm: Neotropical
- Biome: Tropical and subtropical moist broadleaf forests
- Bird species: 650

Geography
- Area: 34,108 km^{2} (13,169 sq mi)
- Countries: Colombia, Ecuador
- Coordinates: 0.887°S 79.523°W
- Geology: Tumaco Basin
- Climate type: Am (equatorial; monsoonal)

The Western Ecuador Moist Forests (NT0178), also known as the Pacific Forest of Ecuador, is an ecoregion in the plains and western foothills of the Andes of southern Colombia and Ecuador. At one time this region contained dense forests with highly diverse flora and fauna, and many endemic species. Most of the original habitat has now been destroyed, and the ecoregion is one of the most threatened in the world.

== Geography ==
=== Location ===
The Western Ecuador moist forests ecoregion covers land to the west of the Andes in Ecuador and southern Colombia. In the northwest and the extreme southwest the ecoregion extends to the Pacific Ocean. The ecoregion is bounded on the north by the Patía River. It extends through the provinces of Esmeraldas, Manabí and Guayas, reaching the Gulf of Guayaquil in the south, and the foothills on the Andes in the east. It varies in width from 100 to 200 kilometres (62 to 124 mi). It has an area of 34,108 square kilometres (13,169 sq mi).

In the extreme north the ecoregion transitions into the Chocó–Darién moist forests ecoregion. To the east it transitions into the Northwestern Andean montane forests. Along the Pacific coast in some areas there are sections of South American Pacific mangroves, and in others there are sections of Ecuadorian dry forests. In the south the ecoregion merges into Guayaquil flooded grasslands.

=== Terrain ===
The ecoregion covers the coastal plain and reaches into the foothills of the Andes to the east up to an elevation of about 800 metres (2,600 ft). The region has had strong volcanic activity, with volcanic rocks found throughout the region, alternating with marine sediments from the Tertiary era (65 million to 2.6 million years ago). The soils are fertile, particularly in the north-central area, which covers volcanic ash and lapilli.

=== Climate ===
The ecoregion receives high rainfall with no significant dry season. Average annual rainfall is highest in the north, with over 7,000 millimetres (280 in) and in some areas over 8,000 millimetres (310 in). In the south annual rainfall averages 2,000 millimetres (79 in), and in all areas exceeds 1,000 millimetres (39 in). Average annual temperatures vary from 23 to 27 °C (73 to 81 °F), with little change throughout the year.

At a sample location at coordinates 0.25°S 79.75°W the Köppen climate classification is Am (equatorial; monsoonal). Mean temperatures range from 23.8 °C (74.8 °F) in July to 25.6 °C (78.1 °F) in April. Total yearly rainfall is about 2,100 millimetres (83 in). Monthly rainfall ranges from 33 millimetres (1.3 in) in August to 376.6 millimetres (14.83 in) in February.

== Ecology ==
The ecoregion is in the neotropical realm, in the tropical and subtropical moist broadleaf forests biome. The forests have many endemic species of plants and animals found only locally on mountain ridges or narrow strips of land.

=== Flora ===
Natural fragmentation of the western moist forests has resulted in rapid evolution of new endemic species. Around 10,000 species of plants have been reported, of which about 2,500 are endemic. The forest has a dense canopy that exceeds 30 metres (98 ft) in height, and has many lianas and epiphytes, including many endemic species. Epiphytes of the Araceae and Cyclanthaceae families are abundant on the lower trunks of the trees. There are also mosses, lichens, ferns and palms in the dense understory. 1,250 species of plants in 136 families have been found in a single area of 100 hectares (250 acres). According to a 1990 report, 122 new orchid species had recently been identified. 43 of the species are endemic.

Emergent species, which may exceed 60 metres (200 ft) in height, include the strangler fig (Ficus dugandii). Large, dominant canopy trees include Brosimum utile, Carapa guianensis, Guarea kunthiana and Virola dixonii. Other trees include Clarisia racemosa, Matisia coloradorum, Pourouma chocoana, Pouteria species, Pseudolmedia eggersii and Symphonia globulifera. The endemic tree Humiriastrum procerum grows to the north of the Guayllabamba River, and is often logged for use in construction. Common understory species include the Iriartea deltoidea and Wettinia quinaria palms. Rare species such as Dicliptera dodsonii are found at the Río Palenque Scientific center in Esmeraldas. There are records of rare or extinct flora such as Carapa megistocarpa and Erythrochiton carinatus.

=== Fauna ===
According to a 1990 report, 5 new mammal species had recently been identified. The jaguar (Panthera onca) is endangered. Other endangered mammals include Baird's tapir (Tapirus bairdii), equatorial dog-faced bat (Molossops aequatorianus) and Geoffroy's spider monkey (Ateles geoffroyi). Endangered reptiles include Boulenger's least gecko (Sphaerodactylus scapularis), green sea turtle (Chelonia mydas) and hawksbill sea turtle (Eretmochelys imbricata). The American crocodile (Crocodylus acutus) is also threatened.

650 species of birds were identified in a 1993 survey, of which many are threatened. Species found in the most humid areas include the Baudo guan (Penelope ortoni), Berlepsch's tinamou (Crypturellus berlepschi), blue-whiskered tanager (Tangara johannae), brown wood rail (Aramides wolfi), crowned woodnymph (Thalurania colombica), El Oro parakeet (Pyrrhura orcesi), El Oro tapaculo (Scytalopus robbinsi), indigo flowerpiercer (Diglossa indigotica), long-wattled umbrellabird (Cephalopterus penduliger) and scarlet-breasted dacnis (Dacnis berlepschi). Species found in less humid areas include grey-backed hawk (Pseudastur occidentalis), ochraceous attila (Attila torridus) and rufous-headed chachalaca (Ortalis erythroptera). Humboldt's sapphire (Hylocharis humboldtii) is found only in the mangroves to the north. Species that have almost been wiped out due to hunting and habitat fragmentation include crested guan (Penelope purpurascens), great curassow (Crax rubra), great green macaw (Ara ambiguus), great tinamou (Tinamus major) and harpy eagle (Harpia harpyja). Endangered birds include banded ground cuckoo (Neomorphus radiolosus), Baudo guan (Penelope ortoni), Esmeraldas woodstar (Chaetocercus berlepschi), great green macaw (Ara ambiguus), grey-backed hawk (Pseudastur occidentalis), grey-cheeked parakeet (Brotogeris pyrrhoptera), rufous-brown solitaire (Cichlopsis leucogenys) and slaty becard (Pachyramphus spodiurus).

Endangered amphibians include Rio Pescado stubfoot toad (Atelopus balios), elegant stubfoot toad (Atelopus elegans), phantasmal poison frog (Epipedobates tricolor), horned marsupial frog (Gastrotheca cornuta), Pichincha rocket frog (Hyloxalus toachi), Pristimantis colomai, spring robber frog (Pristimantis crenunguis), Alto Tambo rain frog (Pristimantis degener), hotel robber frog (Pristimantis tenebrionis), blue-spotted toad (Rhaebo caeruleostictus) and Rio Pitzara robber frog (Strabomantis helonotus).

== Status ==
The World Wide Fund for Nature (WWF) gives the region the status of "Critical/Endangered". Construction of highways and exploration for oil between 1960 and 1980 caused the destruction of most of the moist forests, now one of the most threatened of the world's habitats. Ongoing main threats come from banana plantations and palm oil and rubber extraction. Most of the moist forests in the ecoregion are in the Esmeraldas province between the San Lorenzo Canton south of the Chocó forests of Colombia and Quinindé. There are only small remnants of the original forest elsewhere in the region, and these are degraded near their margins. There are fairly well preserved narrow strips of forest parallel to the mountains in the north, but these are being damaged by settlements and indiscriminate logging. There is some protection in the Cotacachi Cayapas Ecological Reserve, and the highlands from 400 to 900 metres (1,300 to 3,000 ft) are within the Machalilla National Park. The Rio Palenque Scientific Station contributes to research and protection.
