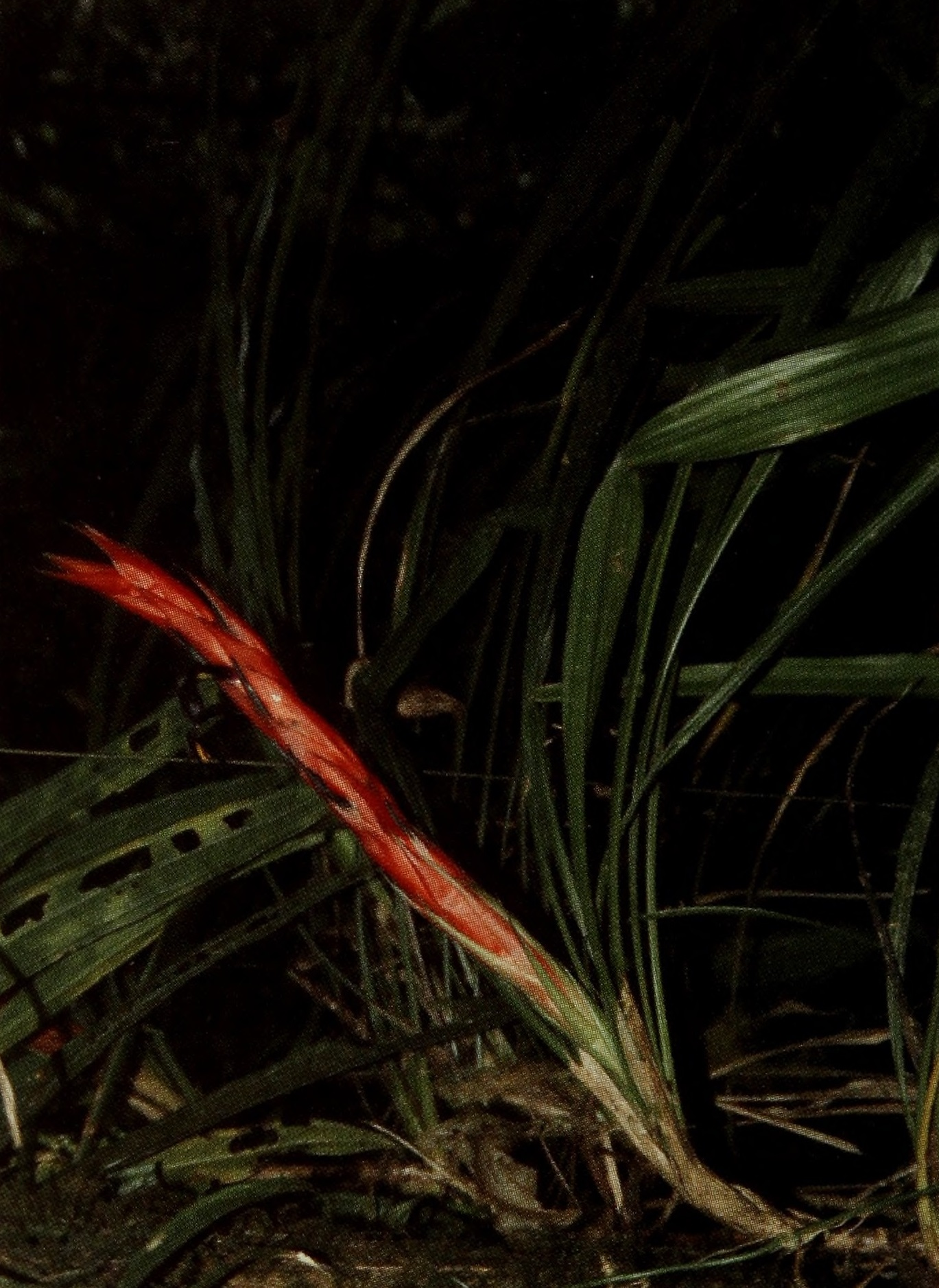

Conservation status
- Endangered (IUCN 3.1)

Scientific classification
- Kingdom: Plantae
- Clade: Tracheophytes
- Clade: Angiosperms
- Clade: Monocots
- Clade: Commelinids
- Order: Poales
- Family: Bromeliaceae
- Genus: Pitcairnia
- Species: P. clarkii

Binomial name
- Pitcairnia clarkii H.Luther

= Pitcairnia clarkii =

Species of flowering plant

Pitcairnia clarkii is a species of plant in the family Bromeliaceae. It is endemic to Ecuador, where it is known only from the type locality in Esmeraldas Province. It grows in coastal forest in a protected area.
