= Gulf of Panama mangroves =

Ecoregion along the Pacific coast of Panama and Colombia

Gulf of Panama mangroves (NT1414)
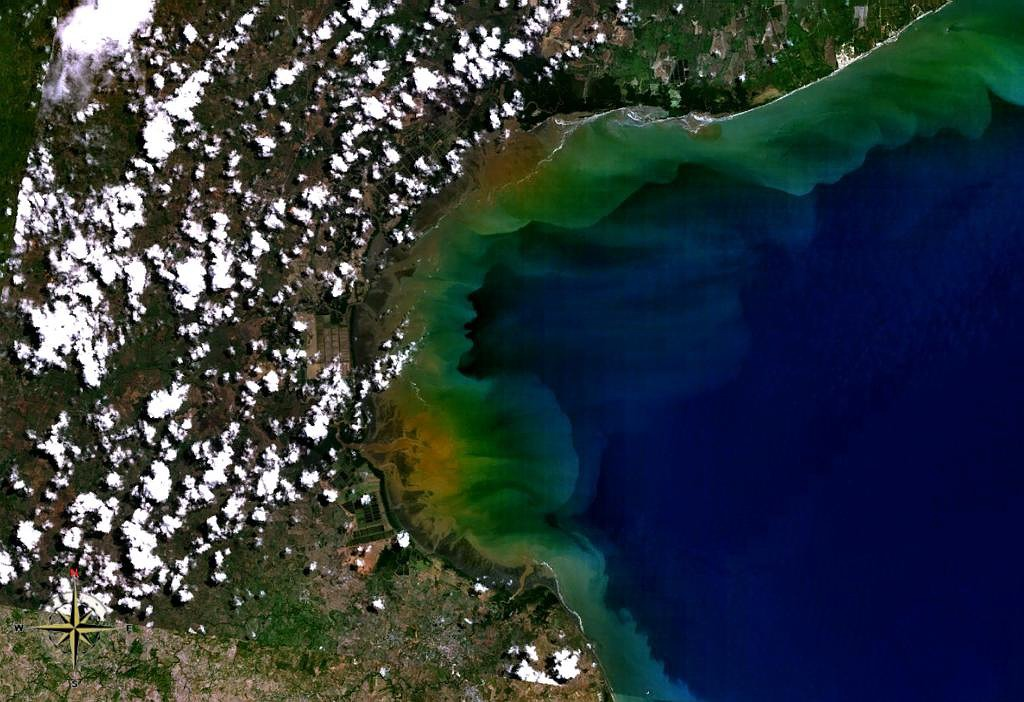
- Satellite view of Gulf of Parita, fringed by mangroves

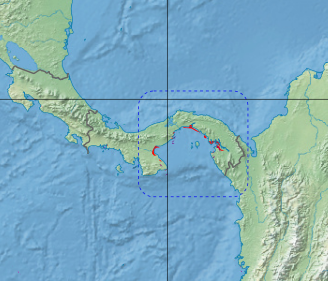
- Ecoregion territory (in red)

Ecology
- Realm: Neotropical
- Biome: Mangroves

Geography
- Area: 2,330 km^{2} (900 sq mi)
- Countries: Panama; Colombia
- Coordinates: 9.008°N 79.100°W

Designations

Ramsar Wetland
- Official name: Bahía de Panamá
- Designated: 20 October 2003
- Reference no.: 1319

The Gulf of Panama mangroves (NT1414) is an ecoregion along the Pacific coast of Panama and Colombia. The mangroves experience seasonal flooding with high levels of sediment, and occasional extreme storms or very low rainfall due to El Niño effects. They are important as a breeding or nursery area for marine species. Areas of the mangroves have been recognized as Important Bird Areas and Ramsar wetlands. The ecoregion has been severely degraded by clearance of mangroves for agriculture, pasturage and shrimp farming, by urban pressure around Panama City, and by pollution related to the Panama Canal.

== Geography ==
=== Location ===
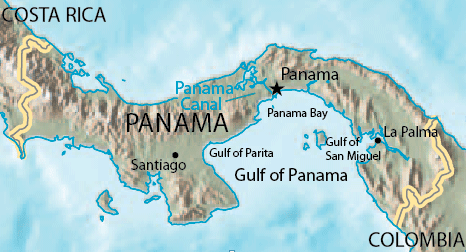
Gulf of Panama with minor gulfs.

The Gulf of Panama mangroves (NT1414) extend from the Gulf of Parita past Chame Bay and Panama Bay to the Bay of San Miguel, also including patches on Bahía de Cupica and near Juradó. They cover an area of 900 square miles (2,300 km^{2}). In the west and the extreme southeast the mangroves fringe areas of Panamanian dry forests. In the center and east they fringe an area of Isthmian–Atlantic moist forests.

=== Hydrology ===
The rivers inland from the ecoregion mostly form on steep slopes. The effects of deforestation, livestock grazing and agriculture are to cause high levels of erosion. The rivers carry large volumes of sediment and nutrients to the mangroves, depositing abundant sand and mud. The sediments prevent coral reefs from growing near the shore, although there are corals beside the islands further offshore. Tides range from 2 to 6 metres (6 ft 7 in to 19 ft 8 in). Around Panama City the tides are twice daily, averaging about 3.76 metres (12.3 ft), and ranging from 2.2 to 4.97 metres (7 ft 3 in to 16 ft 4 in).

=== Climate ===
There is a rainy season from May to December, and a dry season from January to April. Average annual rainfall ranges from 1,070 millimetres (42 in) in the west to 3,000 millimetres (120 in) in the east. Storms and high winds from the east often damage the mangroves. During periods of high rainfall the mangroves are flooded for long periods. However, for much of the year the mangroves experience a shortage of water. During El Niños the rainfall is much lower.

== Ecology ==
The Gulf of Panama mangroves ecoregion is in the neotropical realm, in the mangroves biome. The Panama Bight Mangroves, a Global ecoregion, contains the Gulf of Panama mangroves, Esmeraldas–Pacific Colombia mangroves, Manabí mangroves and Gulf of Guayaquil–Tumbes mangroves.

=== Flora ===
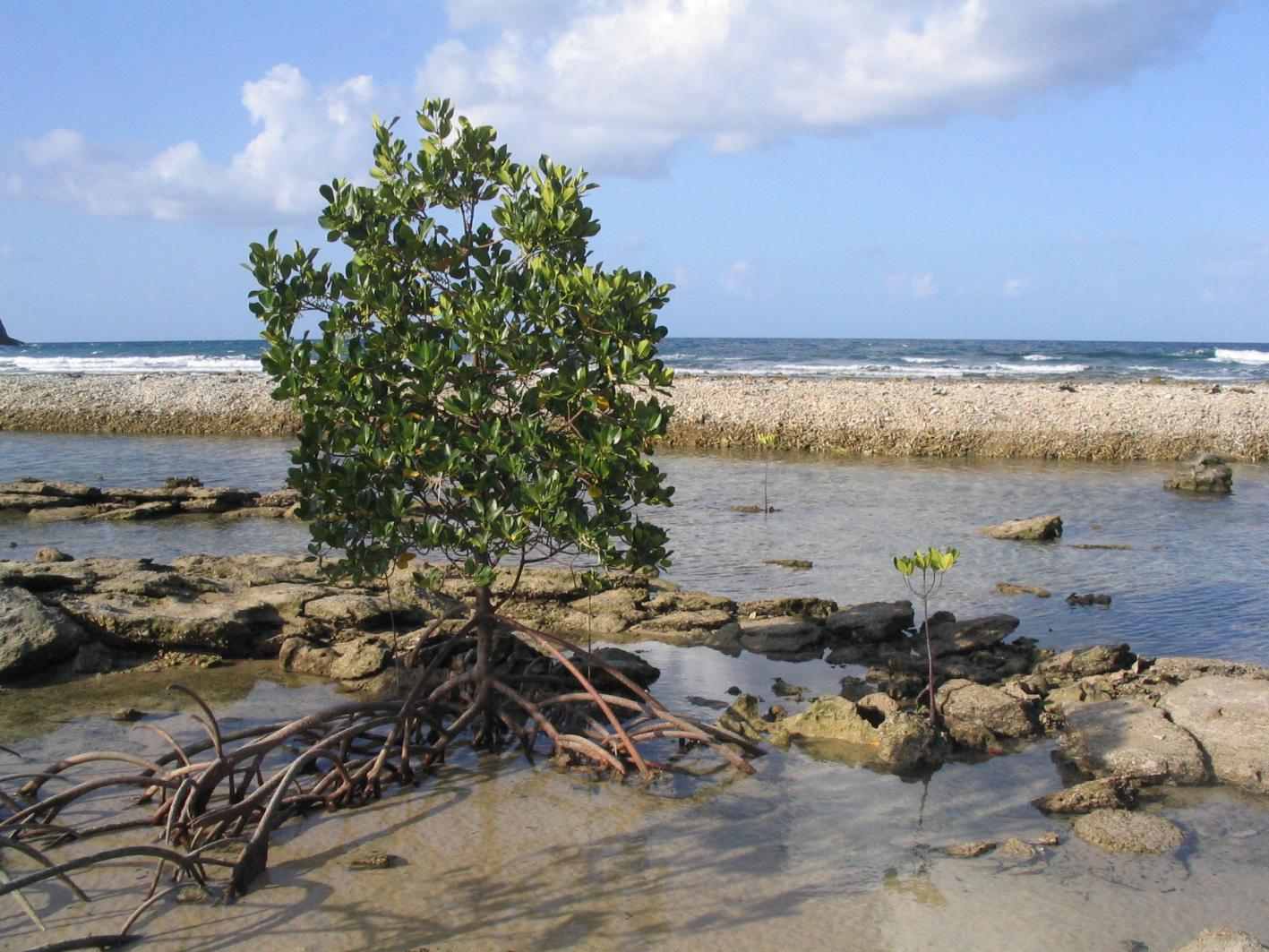
red mangrove Rhizophora mangle

The mangroves are more developed in the east, where rainfall is higher, and in areas where there is most fresh water. The external zones of the mangroves receive estuarine waters directly, while the internal zones are seasonally flooded by the tides. The ecoregion contains small wetlands, which release fresh water slowly during the dry season. In the rainier areas the mangroves transition into freshwater wetlands. In brackish areas the dominant mangroves are Rhizophora mangle and Rhizophora harrisonii, which reach heights of up to 40 metres (130 ft). In progressively fresher water there are Avicennia germinans and Avicennia bicolor, Laguncularia racemosa, Mora oleifera and Montrichardia arborescens. Other species are Pelliciera rhizophorae and Avicennia tonduzii, which is only found in or near this ecoregion.

Punta Mala Bay is in Panama Bay just east of the Panama Canal's Pacific entrance. It holds one of the few areas of mangroves around Panama City. A study published in 2005 found mangroves stands consisting almost entirely of Laguncularia racemosa with many seedlings, which suggested that the forest was rejuvenating. Before construction of a road and water treatment works in 1997–2002 the mangroves had been expanding in the bay. The effect of construction was to wipe out the mangroves in some areas, although in other areas expansion continued. After the end of construction the mangroves began to repopulate bare inter-tidal zones, demonstrating their resilience.

Satellite photographs show that on the Pearl Islands 965 hectares (2,380 acres) of mangroves were lost in 19748–6 and 248 hectares (610 acres) in 1986–2000. On the Isla del Rey and Isla San José, the two largest islands, over 77% of the loss came from logging and development of agriculture. A study of two sites in May 2006 showed that they seemed to be regenerating. One was dominated by Laguncularia racemosa and the other by Pelliciera rhizophorae.

=== Fauna ===
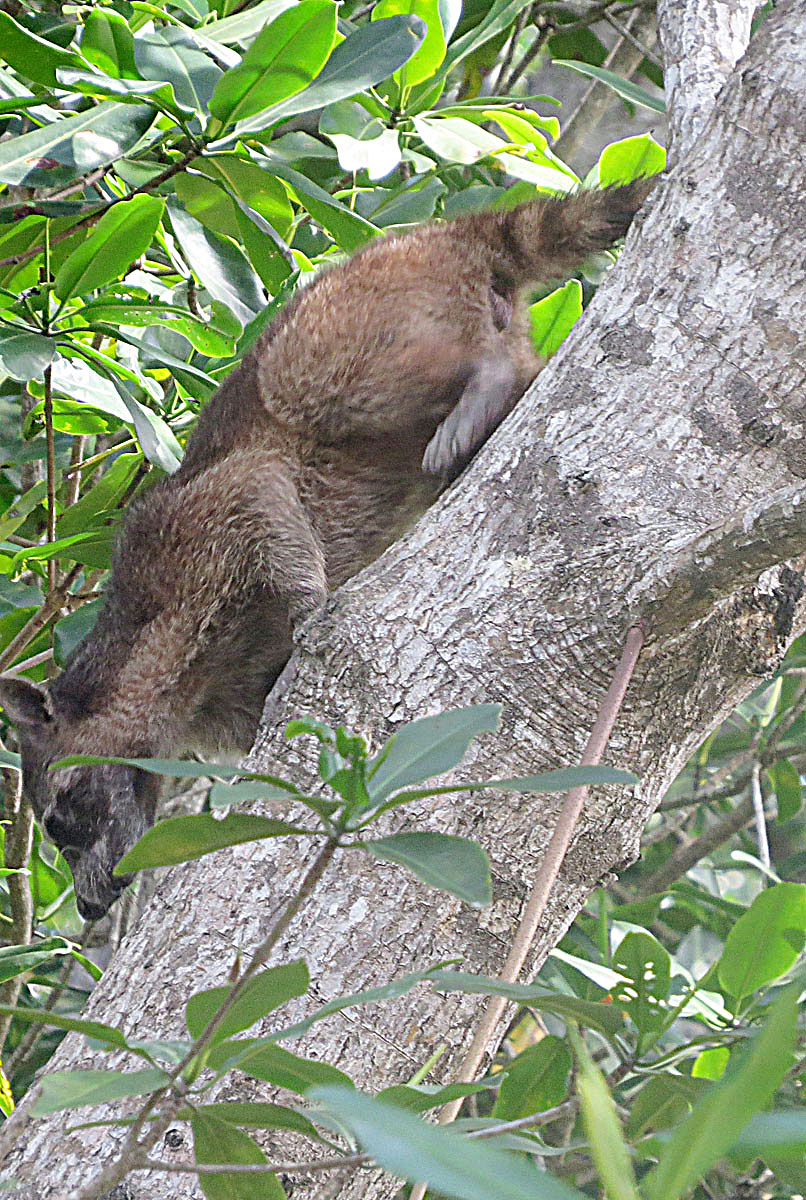
Crab-eating raccoon (Procyon cancrivorus) in the mangroves on the Pacific coast of Darién Province

The woody stems of the mangroves provide habitats and food for marine fauna such as shellfish and fish. The mangroves serve as nurseries for fish, shrimps, crabs and invertebrates. Mammals that live in the trees include crab-eating raccoon (Procyon cancrivorus), mantled howler (Alouatta palliata), northern tamandua (Tamandua mexicana), raccoon (Procyon lotor), silky anteater (Cyclopes didactylus) and white-headed capuchin (Cebus capucinus). White-tailed deer (Odocoileus virginianus) are found in Avicennia bicolor and Laguncularia racemosa mangrove forests. Reptiles include black spiny-tailed iguana (Ctenosaura similis), boa constrictor (Boa constrictor) and green iguana (Iguana iguana).

The Gulf of Panama supports the majority of waterbirds in Panama due in part to the mangrove swamps, as well as the opportunities for foraging in the shrimp ponds and agricultural areas. Bird species include Amazon kingfisher (Chloroceryle amazona), grey-cowled wood rail (Aramides cajaneus), green kingfisher (Chloroceryle americana), lesser nighthawk (Chordeiles acutipennis), mangrove black hawk (Buteogallus anthracinus subtilis), roseate spoonbill (Platalea ajaja), rufous-browed peppershrike (Cyclarhis gujanensis), rufous-necked wood rail (Aramides axillaris) and yellow-billed cotinga (Carpodectes antoniae).

== Status ==
Many families rely on the mangroves for food, materials and fuel, and shrimps taken from the mangroves are the most important source of fishery income. Anchovies, which feed on organic material from the mangroves, are also important Artisanal fishermen take fish that depend on the mangrove such as snappers (Lutjanus species), tallfin croakers (Micropogonias altipinnis) and snooks (Centropomus species). In 2002 about 1,000 people worked in the near-shore artisanal fishery in the Gulf of San Miguel, often in the estuaries and mangrove channels. They caught 185 tonnes of seafood that year.

The new forestry regulations of 1994 made it illegal to harvest trees below a minimum trunk diameter, required environmental impact assessments for projects that could affect the mangroves, and banned expansion of aquaculture in mangrove areas while encouraging it on nearby salt pans. The mangroves and mudflats of the upper Panama Bay from east of Panama City to the Maestra River were recognized as a global IBA (Important Bird Area), the Chimán Wetlands, in 2003, as were the Bayano River mangroves. These two areas, together with the Ensenada de Corral, were declared a Ramsar Wetland of International Importance in 2003.

The World Wide Fund for Nature gives the ecoregion the status "Critical/Endangered". Oil spills in the area around the canal zone in 1968 and in 1986 caused major losses of mangroves. In the more exposed sites this was followed by coastal erosion, but in other sites a combination of natural regrowth and human planting caused the mangroves to recover. Large areas have been transformed into shrimp ponds, fields, cattle pastures and tidally flooded land. Threats in Panama Bay also include land reclamation, urban growth, tourist facilities and pollution. A potential source of pollution is the ships carrying chemicals and oil carried through the Panama Canal. The crops often give low yields.

== Sources ==
- Angehr, George R.; Kushlan, James A. (September 2007), "Seabird and Colonial Wading Bird Nesting in the Gulf of Panama", Waterbirds: The International Journal of Waterbird Biology, 30 (3), Waterbird Society, JSTOR 4501839
- Benfield, Sarah L.; Guzman, Hector M.; Mair, James M. (14 February 2005), "Temporal mangrove dynamics in relation to coastal development in Pacific Panama" (PDF), Journal of Environmental Management, 76, Elsevier
- McGowan, Tom; Cunningham, Sarah L.; Guzmán, Héctor M.; Mair, James M.; Guevara, José M.; Betts, Tanja (September 2010), "Mangrove forest composition and structure in Las Perlas Archipelago, Pacific Panama" (PDF), Revista de Biología Tropical, 58 (3), San José, ISSN 0034-7744
- Panama Bight Mangroves, WWF Global
- Spalding, Mark (23 September 2010), World Atlas of Mangroves, Routledge, ISBN 978-1-136-53095-1
- Tognetti, Sylivia; Burdette, Christine, Central America: Pacific coast of Panama, WWF: World Wide Fund for Nature
- WildFinder, WWF: World Wildlife Fund
