= Edmond Catefort =

Edmond Catefort, also known as Edmundo Catefort or Edmundo Catfort, (29 August 1838 – 28 December 1912) was a French entrepreneur settled who in Ecuador. He played a significant role in the economic and public life of Ecuador during the government of Eloy Alfaro (Liberal Revolution).

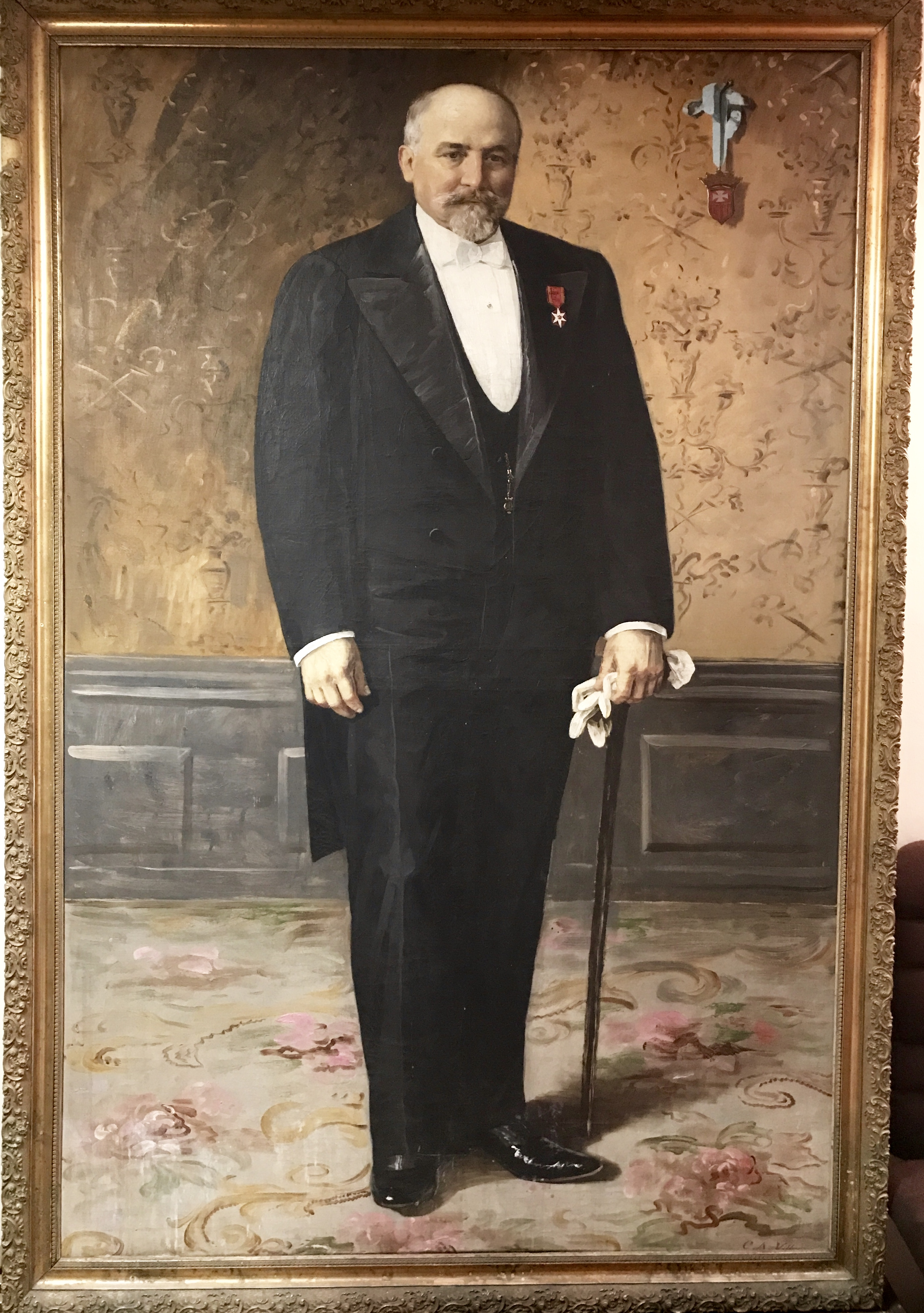
Edmond Catefort

== Biography ==
Catefort was born in 1838 in Sainte Foy la Grande, a commune in the Department of Gironde, Region of Aquitaine, southwestern France. At the age of 18, he travelled to Valparaiso, Chile, in 1856. He later settled in Quito, where he married María Elina Velasco Fabara and had four children: Edmundo, Jorge, Francisco, and Bertha.

He became a successful entrepreneur in Ecuador, owning one of the watermills located near south of Quito for grinding cereal grains. Biographers of Eloy Alfaro, President of Ecuador, state that he stayed in Catefort´s "La Arcadia farm" on the night of 3 September 1895, on the eve of his assumption of power.

== Career ==
On 6 November 1899, Catefort, as the designated ad hoc secretary by the Governor of the Province of Pichincha, confirmed the foundation of the town of Santo Domingo de los Colorados (Santo Domingo de los Tsáchilas), which serves as the capital city of the Province of Santo Domingo de los Tsáchilas.

In 1905, he became Treasurer of the "Junta de Beneficencia de Quito", responsible for initiating the construction of the Eugenio Espejo Hospital and managing various healthcare facilities in Quito, including the oldest, San Juan de Dios Hospital. Additionally, in 1906, he was appointed Chairman of the Quito County Council and became a member of the Special Joint Committee for the construction of the water supply and sewage system of Quito.

In 1907, he became an associate member of the local trade chamber, Camara de Comercio, Agricultura e Industrias de Quito.

The Government of Ecuador contracted with Catefort for the organization of a company, Compañía de los Ferrocarriles Agrícolas al Oeste, to build a 60-centimeter-gauge railway from Daule to Santo Domingo de los Colorados (230 kilometers) on 30 December 1907. However, the project was not executed due to lack of funding from the government. He also contracted for the construction of a railway from the port of Bahia de Caraquez to Chone province of Manabí in 1900. The construction of this new railway started on 20 July 1909. The first train arrived at Chone in June 1912 and operated in this route with four machines until the mid-1960s.

In 1909, President Alfaro also contracted with him to build the water supply and sewage system of Port Bahía de Caráquez, Manabí.

Catefort was buried in 1912 in Père Lachaise Cemetery in Paris.
