= Muisne Canton =

- Canton
- Location of Esmeraldas Province in Ecuador.

- Muisne Canton in Esmeraldas Province
- Coordinates: 0.6067°N 80.0183°W
- Country: Ecuador
- Province: Esmeraldas Province

Area
  - Total: 1,276 km^{2} (493 sq mi)

Population (2022 census)
  - Total: 36,426
  - Density: 28.55/km^{2} (73.94/sq mi)
- Time zone: UTC-5 (ECT)

Muisne Canton is a canton of Ecuador, located in the Esmeraldas Province. Its capital is the town of Muisne. Its population at the 2001 census was 25,080.
