= Roberta Zambrano =

Ecuadorian politician

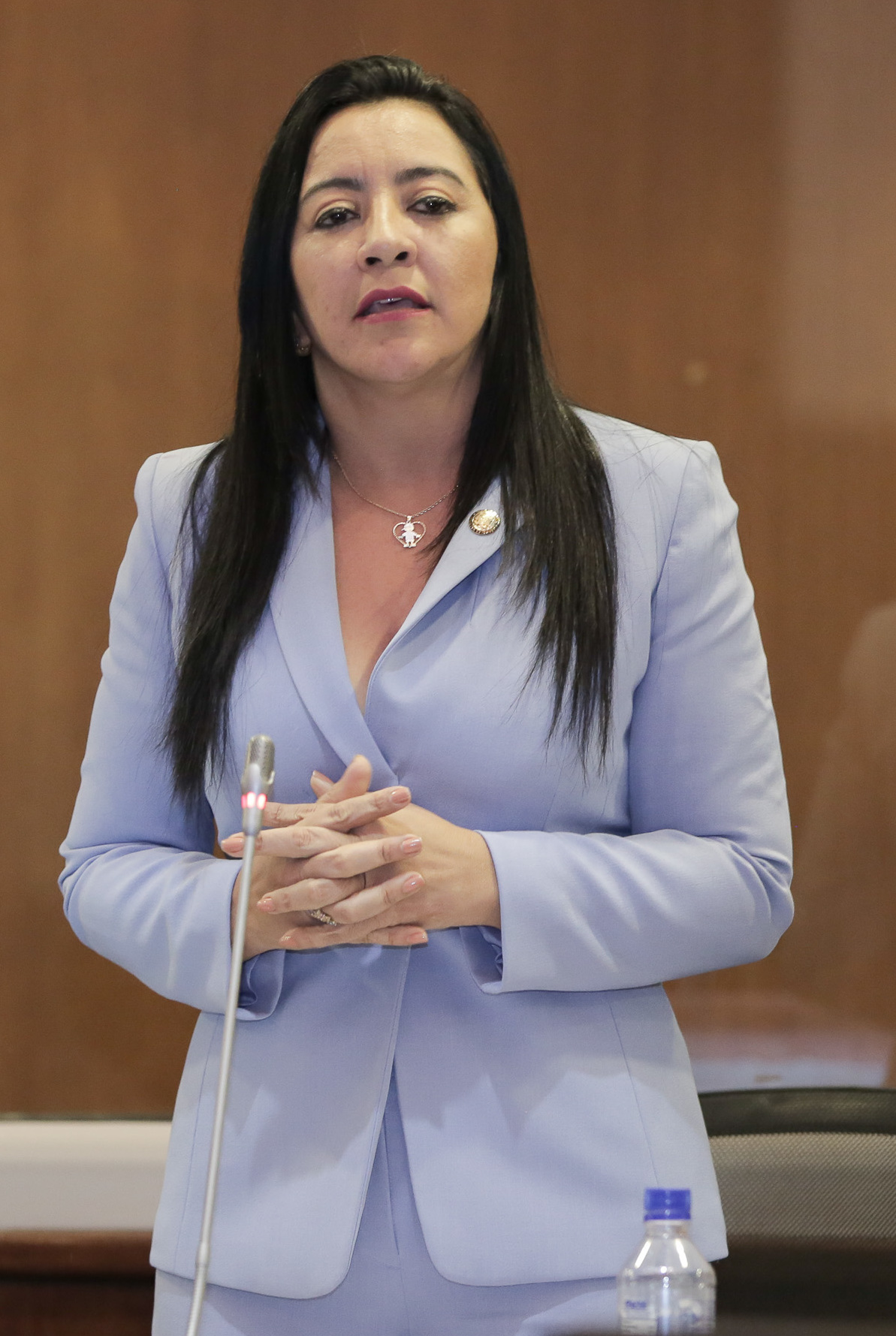
- Zambrano in 2017

18th Prefect of Esmeraldas
- Incumbent
- Assumed office 14 May 2019
- Preceded by: Linder Altafuya Loor

Member of the National Assembly from Esmeraldas
- In office 14 May 2017 – 20 December 2018

Personal details
- Born: María Roberta Zambrano Ortiz; 14 December 1971 (age 54) Guayaquil, Guayas Province, Ecuador
- Party: Social Christian Party
- Occupation: Politician, lawyer

Maria Roberta Zambrano Ortiz (born 14 December 1971) is an Ecuadorian politician. She was a member of the National Assembly before becoming the President of the Consortium of Provincial and Municipal Autonomous Governments of Northern Ecuador.

== Life ==
Zambrano was born in Guayaquil in 1971. She was the daughter of Ramón Zambrano and Olivia Ortiz, but she became an orphan at the age of two and she came under the care of her grandmother. She obtained her bachelor's degree in accounting from the Colegio Particular 9 de Octubre educational center. She obtained a law degree from the Universidad Técnica Luis Vargas Torres. She completed her master's degree at the Simón Bolívar Andean University in Ambato, and she completed a diploma in Criminal Law and Indigenous Justice. In 1996 she was appointed as provincial director for the Institute for Children and the Family.

Zambrano ran for Mayor of Esmeraldas for the Ecuadorian Roldosista Party in 2009 and she came second with just 511 votes behind the elected mayor. In 2017 she ran under the Social Christian Party's banner and she was elected to the National Assembly for the province.

Later in 2019, during the sectional elections, she ran for the Prefecture of Esmeraldas, renouncing her seat in the assembly. In 2020, she assumed the presidency of the Consortium of Provincial and Municipal Autonomous Governments of Northern Ecuador, being the first woman to hold the position.
