= Coaque River =

River in Ecuador

- Mouth location in Ecuador
- Native name: Río Coaque (Spanish)

Location
- Country: Ecuador

Physical characteristics
- Mouth
  - coordinates: 0°01′00″N 80°06′00″W

The Coaque River (Spanish: Río Coaque) is a river in the Manabí Province of Ecuador.

== Course ==
The sources of the Coaque River are in the Bilsa Biological Station in the Mache-Chindul Ecological Reserve. The river enters the Pacific Ocean at coordinates 0.016667°N 80.1°W, to the south of Pedernales.

== Channel maintenance ==
In the winter season of March 2012 landslides in Piedra Maluca deposited large amounts of mud in the river, which created a dyke in the river and caused floods affecting several houses. Roads were closed in the communities of Coaque, Quiauque Abajo, Medio, Arriba, Colisa and La Playa due to the risk of further flooding. Dozens of police and military were deployed to enforce the closure. The Equitesa company was given responsibility for getting the water flowing again.

In February 2013 it was reported that Equitesa, which was building the road from Pedernales to San Vicente, had been mechanically excavating material from the river, apparently without a permit. The excavations had in fact been authorized by a contract signed by the National Water Secretariat on 9 October 2012 to divert a section of the river and avoid future mudslides. After four and a half months of work the Equitesa company had removed 254,145 cubic metres (8,975,000 cu ft) of earth, allowing the river to flow smoothly through the new channel, which had a length of 420 metres (1,380 ft), with a height of 26 metres (85 ft). The National Water Secretariat was continuing to widen the river bed, and would remove another 58,249 cubic metres (2,057,000 cu ft).

== Irrigation project ==
In 2013 the Spanish company Inassa was undertaking a feasibility study for the National Water Secretariat (Senagua) on the multi-purpose Coaque project in Pedernales. The project will develop the Coaque and Tachina river basins, and will include a diversion dam, 7 kilometres (4.3 mi) canal and a system to irrigate 2,100 hectares (5,200 acres) of land. It would also provide drinking water. 60,000 citizens of the Pedernales canton of Manabí would benefit from the project.

== See also ==
- List of rivers of Ecuador

== Sources ==
- Bilsa Biological Station, Jatun Sacha Foundation
- Encauzamiento del río Coaque en servicio: Se removieron 254.145 metros cúbicos de tierra, Secretaría del Agua
- "Extraen Material del Río Coaque", El Diario, 14 February 2013
- Neptali Palma (26 March 2012), "Alerta roja para zonas adjuntas a río Coaque represado", El Universo, Pedernales
- Proyecto Multipropósito Coaque: Estudios con 19% de avance, Secretaría Nacional del Agua
- National Geospatial-Intelligence Agency, Río Coaque: Ecuador
- SENAGUA encauzará el río Coaque para seguridad de pobladores de la zona, Senagua
- Senagua realiza trabajos para prevenir deslizamientos en el Río Coaque, Secretaría Nacional del Agua
