= Muisne River =

River in Ecuador

- Mouth location in Ecuador
- Native name: Rio Muisne (Spanish)

Location
- Country: Ecuador

Physical characteristics
- Mouth
  - coordinates: 0°37′42″N 80°02′31″W

The Muisne River is a river of Ecuador that enters the Pacific Ocean in the Esmeraldas Province.

The Muisne River is the main river in Cojimíes sub-region of the Manabí mangroves ecoregion. It discharges 22 cubic metres per second (780 cu ft/s) into the Pacific. The low-keyed Muisne resort is in the northern part of the Ensenada de Mompiche, on a 7 kilometres (4.3 mi) sand bar among the mangroves of the Muisne River estuary. It may be reached by ferry across the Muisne River from the small town of El Relleno.

== See also ==
- List of rivers of Ecuador

== Sources ==
- Carrera, Paola U.; Jiménez, Pilar G.; Viteri, Xavier, Northern South America: Coastal Ecuador, WWF: World Wide Fund for Nature
- "Muisne", Rough Guides
