= Daule, Esmeraldas =

Town in Esmeraldas, Ecuador

Daule is a small town located south of the city of Esmeraldas in Esmeraldas Province, Ecuador. The town is located on the Pacific Ocean side of Ecuador and the population is about 760 residents in the immediate town.

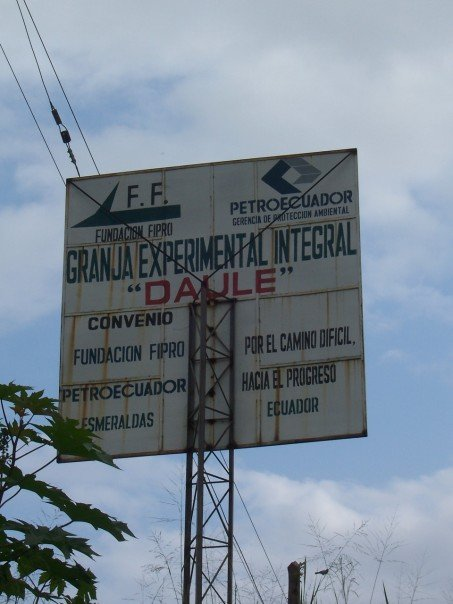

== Geography ==
Today Daule lies within the provincia of Esmeraldas, the canton of Muisne, and the parroquia of Daule itself. Muisne contains the following major cities/towns in its area; Pedro Carlo, Union of Daule, Tola, Maldonado, Bellavista, and Daule. Muisne has an area of about 107 km² with a population of about 1,755 people. The Town of Daule is located by the global coordinates of 0°24′20″N 80°0′46″W. The average elevation is approximately 3–5 meters above sea level. A dirt road leads into town which is about 1 km long which then meets a paved highway and bus shelter. The population of Daule is approximately 760 people.

Daule is located on the west coast of Esmeraldas on the side of the bay. On the east side there are shrimp farms and pointing north the bay is open to the sea. The houses are lined in rows that are parallel to the beach.

== History ==
The town was founded by Juan Clamante Estrada. He owned much of the land where Daule sits today and invested the land in the shrimp and alfalfa (Medicago sativa) industry. He eventually sold some of his land to the government and passed his inheritance to his son Ruben Estrada Gracia. Due to the economic disaster in the agricultural industry, Ruben Estrada Gracia's son Tomas Estrada Mendoza, was forced to sell most of his 500 km² shrimp farms over to the Ecuadorian government and international investors. Besides the small ownership of the farms, the citizens of Daule do not own the land; even though the residence owns the houses that they live in. None of the citizens pay taxes.

== Demographics ==
The town of Daule is about 107 square kilometers in area. The population of Daule is about 1,755 people, of which 54.3% is male and 45.6% is female.

== Economy ==
In a late 1990s a series of financial crises caused the government to abandon its own currency, the sucre, and adopted the U.S. dollar. Ecuador formally adopted the U.S. dollar in the year 2000. Introducing a stronger currency caused great inflation that deeply affected the agricultural industry.

The town of Daule only has two well defined small markets and one bar, however residents do sell various items from their own homes. These items include crops, fish, and crafts. The shrimp farms are taken care of by one person with a regular salary. Every two weeks five or more residents are asked to work for a one-day-pay to help collect and export shrimp to the main city. Most residents have to rely on individual fishing profits.

== Politics ==
There are seven political parties in the area, but the most important ones include; Partido Social Cristiano (PSC), Partido Rosdoldista Ecuatoriano (PRE), and Partido Sociadad Patriotica (PSP). The PSP is the main party in Daule and participants of the political party represent the town in a committee. The town is democratic and is part of the Alianza 3 – 25 division of the PSP party. The following residences of Daule make up the committee:

Coordinator Daule – Sr. Simon Ferrin Sub - Coordinator – Cristian Ismael Solorzano Secretary – Olger Roberto Ortiz Treasurer – Rocio Nilda Gracia

The police and representatives of the PSP committee work together to implement policies and projects in the area. The following residents of Daule work in the police station as part of the Alianza 3 – 25:

Head Chief – Frixon Garcia Bravo Policeman First Division – Teresa Chila Policeman Second Division – Segando Tauri Policeman Third Division – Reina Berina

== Education ==
In the Canton of Muisne 58% of the people are illiterate, while of the other 42% of the people; 20% has a middle school education, 6% has a high school education, and 2% has a college education. To improve the education system in this area the Ecuadorian NGO Fondo Ecuatoriano Populorum Progressio (FEPP) of Italy is working to donate books to help students read, but the schools in many of the parroquinas do not have adequate teachers or room capacity. Another organization from the 'Divino Nino' foundation organized by the Alianza 3 – 25, which is part of the PSP party, focuses on improving healthcare and education. This organization is not working to full potential due to monetary constraints.

In an interview with Ana Estrada Gracias, who is one of the teachers in Daule that has worked for 15 years, gave a strong feedback about the education in Daule. The school of Daule has first grade and continues on to seventh grade. Students continuing their education have to leave the town to a large town. During the first years the students are taught to read, write, add, subtract, divide, and multiply, and their national history. The school has three classrooms in which 140 students attend. Due to the lack of space classrooms have to be divided with curtains and each cubicle has two teachers, each teaching on opposite sides of the classroom. A major problem is that not all children are on the same intellectual level due to lack of proper schooling.

The tuition for the school in Daule is five dollars per year and this includes books and supplies. The Canton of Muisne pays for the school teachers. Illiterate adults can take classes in writing and reading which are subsidized by the government.

In another interview with Eva Francis, who is a teacher at the school says that "out of the forty students the joined first grade, on average only six of them will graduate from seventh grade. The main problem is due to the lack of discipline, family obligations, and money".

== Health care and public issues ==
Adults in the town do not have any form of retirement or health care plans. There are no hospitals, clinics, or nurseries within the town. The government believes that the citizens can work well into their seventies. Occasionally food trucks come and deliver food for free, but they have little sympathy for adults who they believe should be able to work. Malaria and yellow fever is a prevalent problem in the area due to the amount of insects such as mosquitoes . In addition to insect spread illnesses, gastrointestinal problems exist due to the lack of clean drinking water.

Due to the geography of the town, the town is vulnerable to sea level rise from tropical storms. The water enters through the north side where the cemetery is located. Once the town is partly drowned by water, the terrain made up of sand and the surrounding shrimp farms makes the water harder to evaporate or be absorbed. This has a huge economic effect as well as a major impact with health issues. It is difficult to find a solution for the flooding because the town already suffers from socially and economical issues. If anything, the flooding makes problems worse for the people of Daule.

== Environmental issues ==
There are no established landfill facilities or recycling programs established, except for the use of glass bottles. Because of the lacking structured garbage system, garbage can be found anywhere and everywhere in the town. These areas include the beaches, the water, and the streets.

The town has two major sources of drinking water. One of which is located next to a local church is a highly contaminated and is high in salinity. The second source is from a local river that is much cleaner.

Erosion is a major problem is Daule because of the soil make up. The soil consists mostly of sand. In addition, there are no controls on cutting down tree and shrubs in the area. This causes the soil to more easily erode away. Erosion also occurs when storms hit the area and the sea rises. When the sea rises the water currents carry the soils out to sea.

== Water quality ==
The town of Daule can get its water from four major sources: the water in front of the town, imported bottled water, a nearby river, and a well that is beside the church. The water in front of the town essentially comes from the Pacific Ocean. Imported bottled water is an expensive alternative. The water from a nearby river still costs money for transportation. Water from the church well is free but contains a lot of salt.

From the data and observation, the best water for drinking is the water from a nearby river. However, further data must be collected over a longer period of time. Also, bacterial and microbial tests need to be completed.

Water quality data: comparison of sources
Parameter	Water source	
Parameter	Church well	Nearby river
Total dissolved solids	1018 mg/L	208 mg/L
Dissolved oxygen	4.70 mg/L	7.68 mg/L
Salinity	100%	1%
Conductivity	2.21 ms/cm	479 μs/cm
Nitrate levels	1.75 ppm	0 ppm
Nitrite levels	0 ppm	0 ppm
Hardness	120 ppm	120 ppm
Alkalinity	180 ppm	120 ppm
pH	8	7.8
Ammonia levels	0 ppm	0 ppm
Chlorine levels	0 ppm	0 ppm
Color	yellowish-clear	clear

== Current developments ==
In late August 2006, a group of students traveled to Ecuador on behalf of Engineers Without Borders – Bucknell University Chapter to begin assessment of the town and begin a study of Daule, Ecuador. The purpose of the study was to evaluate the infrastructure of the community and to advise the village leaders on the procedure for submitting a project request to Engineers Without Borders or similar organizations. The team consisted of three students, a chapter mentor, and a Peace Corps volunteer.

In March 2007, a group of students traveled to Ecuador on behalf of Engineers for a Sustainable World – The Pennsylvania State University chapter to extend the study of the previous trip to Ecuador. The purpose of the study was to undergo an extensive community assessment and topographical survey of the town to determine the appropriate action for a solution to the community development and flood control problem. The team consisted of four students, four faculty advisors, a Peace Corps volunteer, and two non-traveling students.

== Elevation survey of Daule ==

The survey map shows the general contour of the town of Daule. Zero is set in the corner of town near a telephone pole as seen on the map. The general trend shows that the highest elevation is near the ocean and decrease as on moves away from the ocean toward the levee. This explains why there is always standing water in the town near the levee and why water during storms has difficulty draining out of the town.

== Housing and street layout ==
The map is the actual street layout of all of the housing in Daule.

== Gallery ==
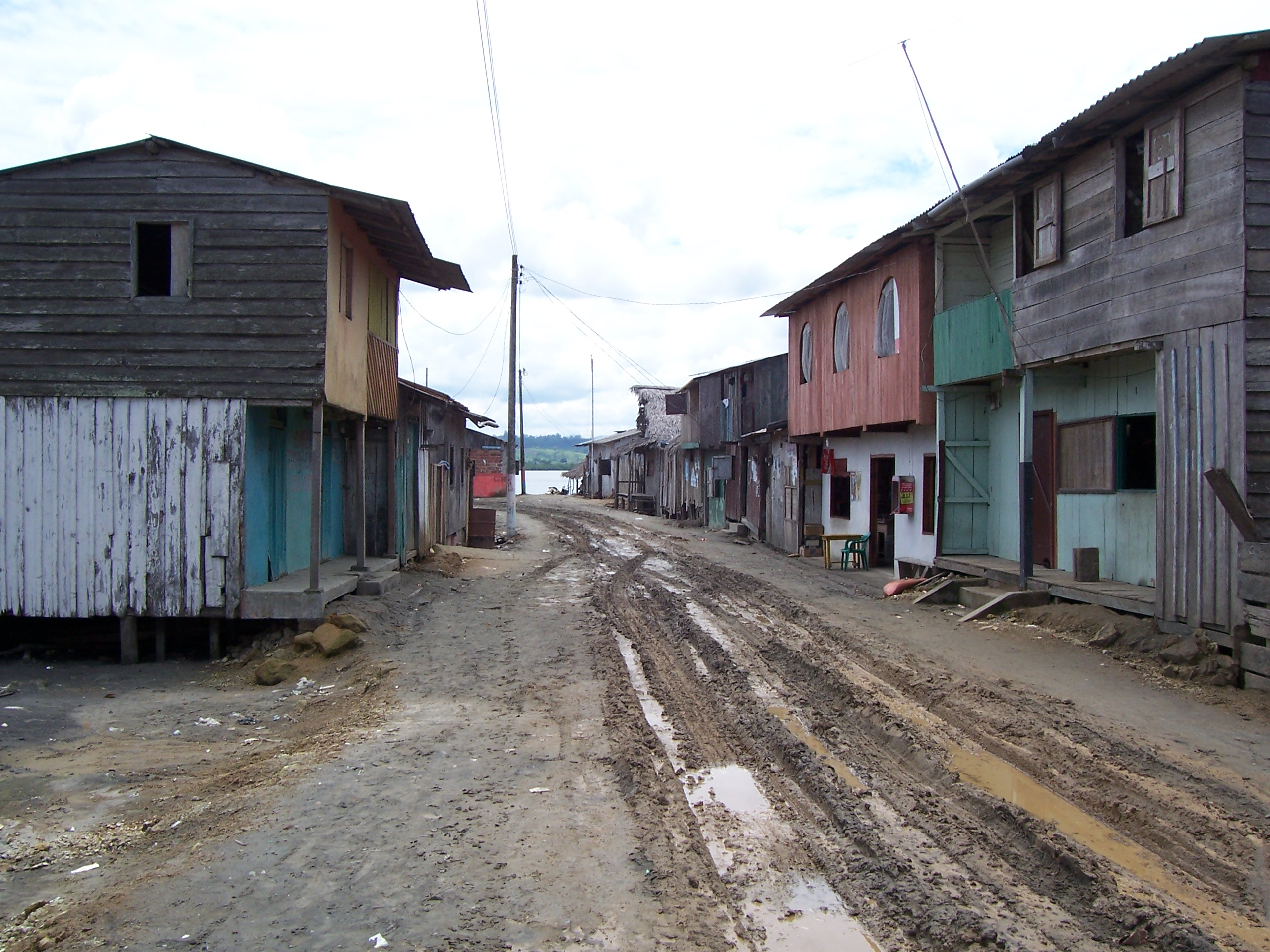
Main Street in Daule
