= List of mangrove ecoregions =

List ordered by region

This is a list of mangrove ecoregions ordered according to whether they lie in the Afrotropical, Australasian, Indomalayan, or Neotropical realms of the world. Mangrove estuaries such as those found in the Sundarbans of southwestern Bangladesh are rich productive ecosystems which serve as spawning grounds and nurseries for shrimp, crabs, and many fish species, a richness which is lost if the area is cleared and converted to ponds for shrimp farming or rice paddies.

== Afrotropical ==
Afrotropical mangroves ecoregions
Red Sea mangroves	Djibouti, Egypt, Eritrea, Saudi Arabia, Somalia, Sudan, Yemen
Central African mangroves	Angola, Cameroon, Democratic Republic of the Congo, Equatorial Guinea, Gabon, Ghana, Niger Delta
East African mangroves	Kenya, Mozambique, Somalia, Tanzania
Guinean mangroves	Senegal, Gambia, Guinea-Bissau, Guinea, Sierra Leone, Liberia, Ivory Coast
Madagascar mangroves	Madagascar
Southern Africa mangroves	Mozambique, South Africa

== Australasian ==
Australasian mangroves ecoregions
New Guinea mangroves	New Guinea
Australian mangroves	Australia

== Indomalayan ==
Indomalayan mangroves ecoregions
Godavari–Krishna mangroves	India
Indochina mangroves	Cambodia, Malaysia, Thailand, Vietnam
Indus River Delta–Arabian Sea mangroves	Pakistan
Myanmar coast mangroves	Bangladesh, Myanmar, India, Malaysia, Thailand
Sunda Shelf mangroves	Brunei, Indonesia, Malaysia
Sundarbans mangroves	Bangladesh, India

== Nearctic ==
Nearctic mangroves ecoregions
Northwest Mexican Coast mangroves	Mexico

== Neotropical ==
Neotropical mangroves ecoregions
Alvarado mangroves	Mexico
Amapá mangroves	Brazil
Bahamian mangroves	Bahamas, Turks and Caicos Islands
Bahia mangroves	Brazil
Belizean Coast mangroves	Belize
Belizean reef mangroves	Belize
Bocas del Toro–San Bastimentos Island–San Blas mangroves	Costa Rica, Panama
Coastal Venezuelan mangroves	Venezuela
Esmeraldas–Pacific Colombia mangroves	Colombia, Ecuador
Florida mangroves	United States
Greater Antilles mangroves	Cuba, Dominican Republic, Haiti, Jamaica, Puerto Rico
Guianan mangroves	French Guiana, Guyana, Suriname, Venezuela
Gulf of Fonseca mangroves	El Salvador, Honduras, Nicaragua
Gulf of Guayaquil–Tumbes mangroves	Ecuador, Peru
Gulf of Panama mangroves	Panama
Ilha Grande mangroves	Brazil
Lesser Antilles mangroves	Lesser Antilles
Magdalena–Santa Marta mangroves	Colombia
Manabí mangroves	Ecuador
Maranhão mangroves	Brazil
Marismas Nacionales–San Blas mangroves	Mexico
Mayan Corridor mangroves	Mexico
Mexican South Pacific Coast mangroves	Mexico
Moist Pacific Coast mangroves	Costa Rica, Panama
Mosquitia–Nicaraguan Caribbean Coast mangroves	Costa Rica, Honduras, Nicaragua
Northern Dry Pacific Coast mangroves	El Salvador, Guatemala
Northern Honduras mangroves	Guatemala, Honduras
Pará mangroves	Brazil
Petenes mangroves	Mexico
Piura mangroves	Peru
Ría Lagartos mangroves	Mexico
Rio Negro–Rio San Sun mangroves	Costa Rica, Nicaragua
Rio Piranhas mangroves	Brazil
Rio São Francisco mangroves	Brazil
Southern Dry Pacific Coast mangroves	Costa Rica, Nicaragua
Tehuantepec–El Manchón mangroves	Mexico
Trinidad mangroves	Trinidad and Tobago
Usumacinta mangroves	Mexico

== See also ==
- Mangrove
- Ecoregion
