= Equatorial dog-faced bat =

Conservation status
- Endangered (IUCN 3.1)

Scientific classification
- Kingdom: Animalia
- Phylum: Chordata
- Class: Mammalia
- Order: Chiroptera
- Family: Molossidae
- Genus: Cabreramops
- Species: C. aequatorianus

Binomial name
- Cabreramops aequatorianus Cabrera, 1917

Synonyms
- Molossops aequatorianus

Species of bat

The equatorial dog-faced bat (Cabreramops aequatorianus) is a species of bat in the family Molossidae. It is endemic to Ecuador. They are found in dry, tropical forests. The species is now endangered. The equatorial dog-faced bat feeds on insects.

== Taxonomy ==
This species was discovered by Spanish zoologist Marcos Jiménez de la Espada in November 1864. Espada encountered four females in Babahoyo, Ecuador near the Guayas River in the crack of an old tree, roosting with harmless serotine bats. It was described by Ángel Cabrera in 1917. Its species name aequatorianus is derived from the Latin word aequatoriensis, meaning "Ecuadorian."

Though previously included in the genus Molossops and the subgenus Cabreramops, the equatorial dog-faced bat is now often regarded as the sole species in the genus Cabreramops.

== Range and habitat ==
This species is found in dry, tropical forests in west central Ecuador. It has only been found in two locations.

== Conservation ==
The IUCN assessed this species as vulnerable in 1996 and 2008. In 2016, its status was revised to endangered. They are listed as endangered because they occur at fewer than five locations, and a decline is projected in their area and quality of habitat. Its extent of occurrence is estimated at 4,000 km^{2} (1,500 mi^{2}). Threats facing this species include habitat destruction, as their habitat is being converted for agricultural usage. Populations that occur in swampy areas are under threat from aquaculture.
