= Avicennia bicolor =

Conservation status
- Vulnerable (IUCN 3.1)

Scientific classification
- Kingdom: Plantae
- Clade: Tracheophytes
- Clade: Angiosperms
- Clade: Eudicots
- Clade: Asterids
- Order: Lamiales
- Family: Acanthaceae
- Genus: Avicennia
- Species: A. bicolor

Binomial name
- Avicennia bicolor Standl.

Synonyms
- Hilairanthus bicolor (Standl.) Cornejo; Avicennia tonduzii Moldenke

Species of plant

Avicennia bicolor is a species of tropical mangrove in the family Acanthaceae. It grows in coastal and estuarine locations in the Tropical Eastern Pacific, from southern Mexico (Chiapas) along the Pacific coast of Central America to western Colombia.
