= Gulf of Guayaquil =

Coordinates: 03°00′S 80°30′W

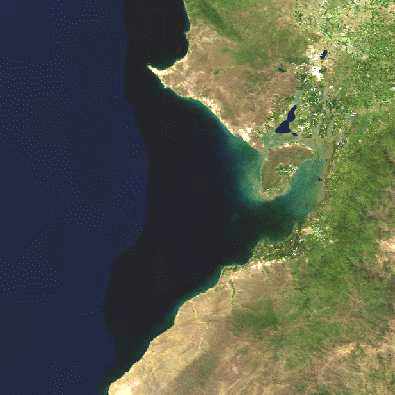
Gulf of Guayaquil

The Gulf of Guayaquil is a large body of water of the Pacific Ocean in western South America. Its northern limit is the city of Santa Elena, in Ecuador, and its southern limit is Cabo Blanco, in Peru.

The gulf takes its name from the city of Guayaquil. Rivers of both Ecuador and Peru empty in the Gulf of Guayaquil, like the Guayas River, the Jubones River, the Zarumilla River and the Tumbes River.

A series of geological faults underlay the gulf. Various of these faults continue across mainland Ecuador. The main faults of the gulf are NNE-SSW oriented and are of mixed strike-slip and reverse type with dextral movement. These faults may generate dangerous earthquakes.
