= Muisne =

- Town
- Nickname: Garden of Esmeraldas
- Location within Ecuador
- Coordinates: 0°36′39″N 80°01′7″W
- Ecuador: Ecuador
- Province: Esmeraldas
- Canton: Muisne Canton

Government
  - Mayor: Jorge Chiriboga Guerrero

Area
  - Town: 4.32 km^{2} (1.67 sq mi)
- Elevation: 1 m (3.3 ft)

Population (2022 census)
  - Town: 5,574
  - Density: 1,290/km^{2} (3,340/sq mi)
- Time zone: UTC-5 (ECT)
- Climate: Am

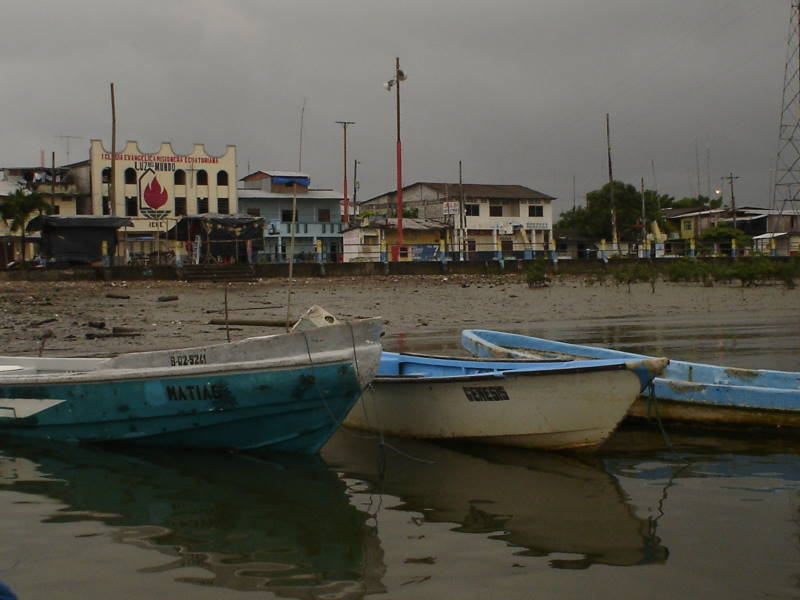

Muisne is a coastal town in the southwest of the province of Esmeraldas in northwestern Ecuador, with a population of 5,574 in the last Ecuadorian census in 2022. It is the seat of the namesake canton.

The town is located on the northern tip of the small coastal island known as Isla de Muisne in the Ensenada de Mompiche bay. The channel of the Muisne River estuary between the mainland and the eastern side of the island is crossed mainly by small outboard-motor boats for passengers and by barges for cars and small trucks.

On the western side of the island there is a beach which attracts both local and foreign tourists.

The canton of Muisne contains several other parroquias (small villages or parishes), including Pedro Carlo, San Francisco del Cabo (the oldest parish), Bunche, Union of Daule, Tola, Maldonado, Bellavista, and Daule.

== See also ==
- 2016 Ecuador earthquake
