= Esmeraldas Province =

Province of Ecuador

Esmeraldas
- Province
- Province of Esmeraldas
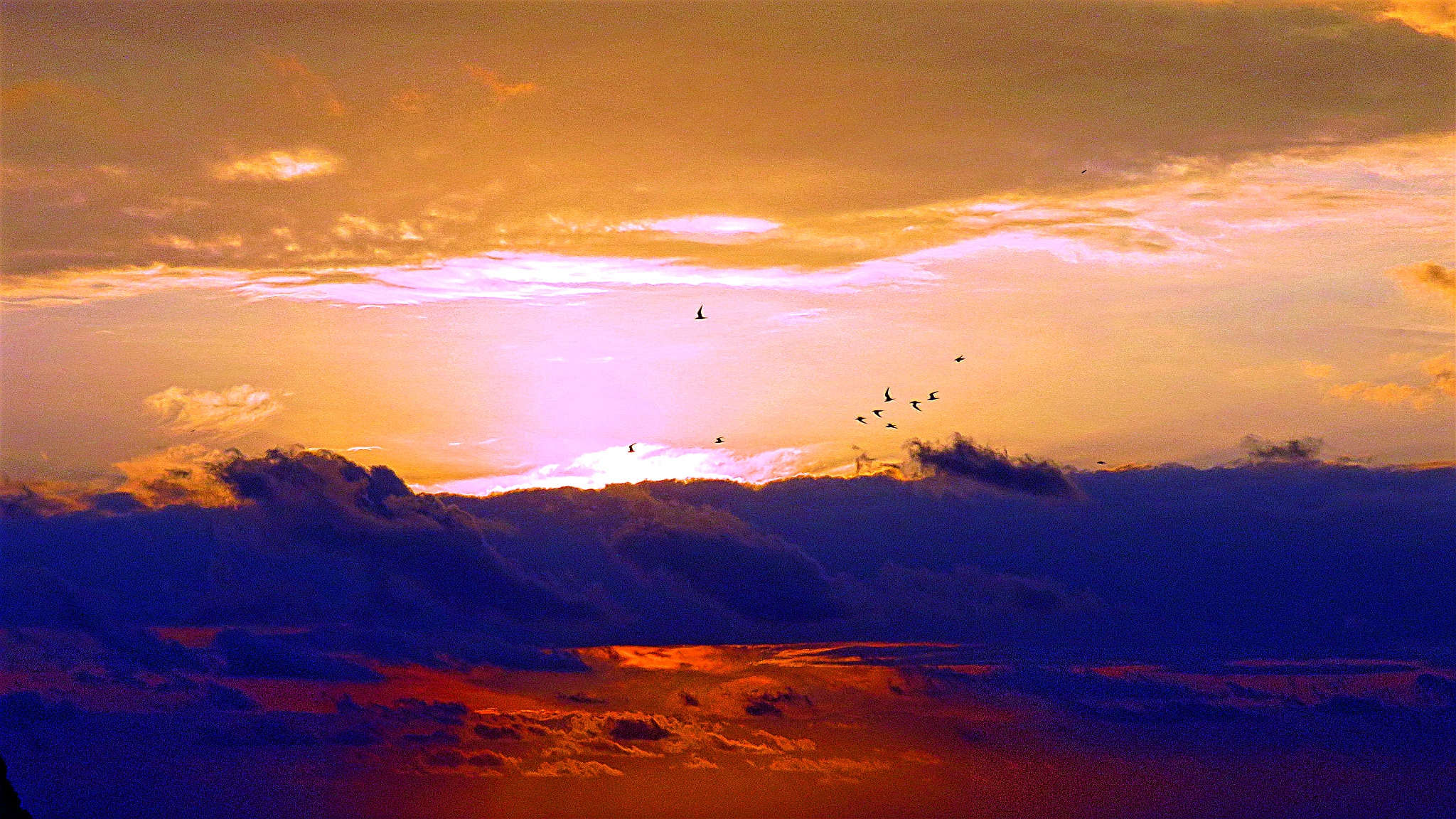
- Sunset in Esmeraldas

- Flag

- Location within Ecuador

- Cantons of Esmeraldas Province
- Coordinates: 0°40′N 79°15′W
- Country: Ecuador
- Established: September 21, 1847
- Capital: Esmeraldas
- Cantons: List of Cantons

Government
  - Prefect: Roberta Zambrano (PSC)
  - Governor: Segundo Jaramillo

Area
  - Province: 15,841 km^{2} (6,116 sq mi)

Population (2010 census)
  - Province: 553,900
  - Density: 34.97/km^{2} (90.56/sq mi)
  - Urban: 248,586
- Vehicle registration: E
- HDI (2017): 0.718 high · 16th

Esmeraldas (Spanish pronunciation: [esmeˈɾaldas]) is a northwestern coastal province of Ecuador. The capital and largest city is Esmeraldas. Esmeraldas is one of the three provinces of Ecuador that borders Colombia, and it is the most northern province in the country. The province borders Imbabura and Carchi to the east, the Pacific Ocean to the west, Manabí, Santo Domingo de los Tsáchilas and Pichincha to the south, and Colombia to the north. The province is home to the Afro-Ecuadorian culture.

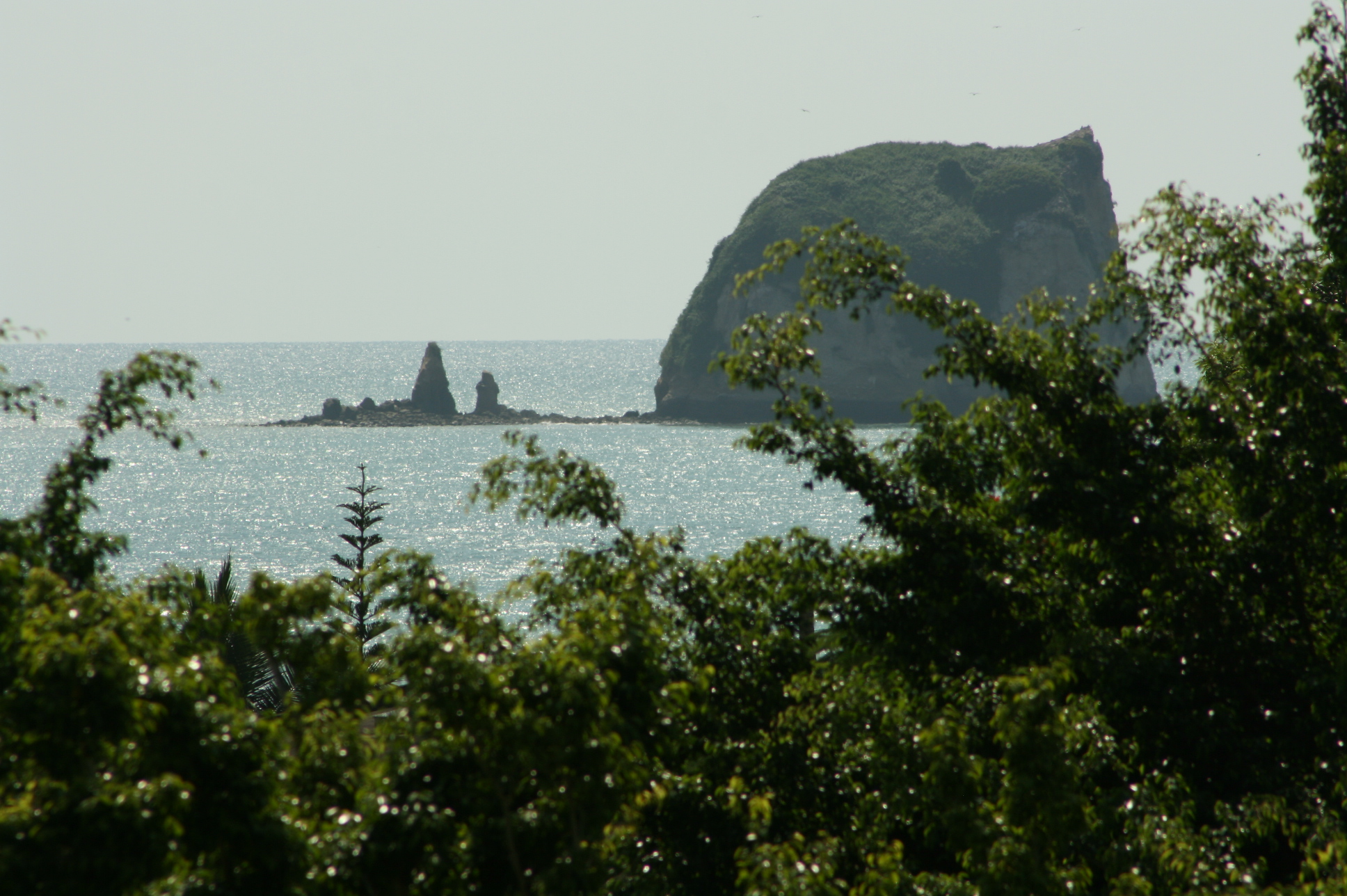
The Rock of Sua

== Demographics ==
Ethnic groups as of the Ecuadorian census of 2010:

- Mestizo 44.7%
- Afro-Ecuadorian 43.9%
- White 5.9%
- Indigenous 2.8%
- Montubio 2.4%
- Other 0.3%

== Governance ==
The province has a governor who is appointed by the President. In 2013 Paola Cabezas was appointed as the Governor by President Rafael Correa. She served for three years until she resigned and she was succeeded by Gabriel Rivera López who was also appointed by President Correa.

== Cantons ==
The province is divided into 7 cantons. The following table lists each with its population at the time of the 2001 census, its area in square kilometres (km^{2}), and the name of the canton seat or capital.

Canton	Pop. (2019)	Area (km^{2})	Seat/Capital
Atacames	54,200	511	Atacames
Eloy Alfaro	45,270	4,302	Valdez (a.k.a. Limones)
Esmeraldas	216,900	1,351	Esmeraldas
Muisne	31,030	1,265	Muisne
Quinindé	144,200	3,855	Rosa Zárate (a.k.a. Quinindé)
Río Verde	31,160	1,506	Rioverde
San Lorenzo	60,660	3,106	San Lorenzo

== Parroquias (Parishes) ==
The cantons are divided into many parroquias:

In Muisne:

1. Bellavista
2. Daule
3. Maldonado
4. Muisne
5. Pedro Carlo
6. Tola
7. Union of Daule

== See also ==
- Cantons of Ecuador
- Provinces of Ecuador
- Mompiche
