= List of ecoregions in Costa Rica =

The following is a list of ecoregions in Costa Rica. Ecoregions cover relatively large areas of land or water, and contain characteristic, geographically distinct assemblages of natural communities and species. The biodiversity of flora, fauna and ecosystems that characterise an ecoregion tends to be distinct from that of other ecoregions. Ecoregions are grouped into larger bioregions, which in turn form the eight biogeographic realms of the Earth's surface. Costa Rica is a country in Central America, bordered by Nicaragua to the north, Panama to the southeast, the Pacific Ocean to the west, and the Caribbean Sea to the east. It contains 5% of the world's biodiversity.

== Terrestrial ecoregions ==
Costa Rica is in the Neotropical realm and Central America bioregion, and divided into the following terrestrial ecoregions, organized by biome:

- Tropical and subtropical moist broadleaf forests
  - Central American Atlantic moist forests
  - Cocos Island moist forests
  - Costa Rican seasonal moist forests
  - Isthmian–Atlantic moist forests
  - Isthmian–Pacific moist forests
  - Talamancan montane forests
- Tropical and subtropical dry broadleaf forests
  - Central American dry forests
- Montane grasslands and shrublands
  - [Talamanca Paramo]
- Mangrove
  - Bocas del Toro–San Bastimentos Island–San Blas mangroves
  - Moist Pacific Coast mangroves
  - Rio Negro–Rio San Sun mangroves
  - Southern Dry Pacific Coast mangroves

== Freshwater ecoregions ==
- Chiriqui
- Estero Real–Tempisque
- Isthmus Caribbean
- San Juan (Nicaragua/Costa Rica)

== Marine ecoregions ==
Costa Rica's Pacific coast is in the Tropical Eastern Pacific marine realm, and the Caribbean coast is in the Tropical Atlantic marine realm.

=== Tropical Atlantic ===
- Southwestern Caribbean

=== Tropical Eastern Pacific ===
- Chiapas-Nicaragua
- Nicoya
- Cocos Island
