= Central America bioregion =

Biogeographic region comprising southern Mexico and Central America

The Central America bioregion is a biogeographic region comprising southern Mexico and Central America.

The bioregion covers the southern portion of Mexico, all of Belize, Costa Rica, El Salvador, Guatemala, Honduras, and Nicaragua, and all but easternmost Panama.

WWF defines bioregions as "geographic clusters of ecoregions that may span several habitat types, but have strong biogeographic affinities, particularly at taxonomic levels higher than the species level (genus, family)."

The bioregion lies in the tropics, and is home to tropical moist broadleaf forests, tropical dry broadleaf forests, and tropical coniferous forests. The higher mountains are home to cool-climate montane forests, grasslands and shrublands.

== Origins and prehistory ==
Central America connects North America to South America. The land bridge was completed 2.8 million years ago, when the Isthmus of Panama was formed, linking the two continents for the first time in tens of millions of years. The resulting Great American Interchange of animals and plants shaped the flora and fauna of the Central America bioregion.

== Flora ==
Plants of South American origin came to dominate the tropical lowlands of Central America.

The montane vegetation of the region is distinct from the lowland vegetation, and includes species with origins in temperate North America, including oaks (Quercus), Pines (Pinus) and alders (Alnus). It also includes relict taxa which were once more widespread in North America, and spread southwards into the Central American highlands during cooler climate periods, some reaching as far as the northern Andes of northwestern South America. These include the genus Ticodendron (Ticodendraceae), Matudaea (Hamamelidae), Trigonobalanus excelsa of Colombia (Fagaceae), and Nyssa talamancala (Cornaceae). Other montane species are tropical lowland taxa which adapted to the cooler highlands, as well as taxa with origins in temperate South America like Weinmannia and Drimys.

== Fauna ==
Large mammals include the white-lipped peccary (Tayassu pecari), Baird's tapir (Tapirus bairdii), white-tailed deer (Odocoileus virginianus), Central American red brocket (Mazama temama), Yucatan brown brocket (Odocileus pandora), giant anteater (Myrmecophaga tridactyla), brown-throated sloth (Bradypus variegatus), jaguar (Panthera onca), cougar (Puma concolor), and ocelot (Leopardus pardalis).

Central America's freshwater fish and invertebrates are mostly of South American origin. 95% of Central American freshwater fish are South American in origin, with only the tropical gar (Atractosteus tropicus), three clupeids (Dorosoma), a catostomid (Ictiobus), and an ictalurid (Ictalurus) of North American origin.

== Ecoregions ==
=== Tropical and subtropical moist broadleaf forests ===
- Cayos Miskitos–San Andrés and Providencia moist forests (Colombia, Nicaragua)
- Central American Atlantic moist forests (Costa Rica, Nicaragua, Panama)
- Central American montane forests (El Salvador, Guatemala, Honduras, Mexico, Nicaragua)
- Chiapas montane forests (Mexico)
- Chimalapas montane forests (Mexico)
- Cocos Island moist forests (Costa Rica)
- Costa Rican seasonal moist forests (Costa Rica, Nicaragua)
- Eastern Panamanian montane forests (Colombia, Panama)
- Isthmian–Atlantic moist forests (Costa Rica, Nicaragua, Panama)
- Isthmian–Pacific moist forests (Costa Rica, Panama)
- Oaxacan montane forests (Mexico)
- Pantanos de Centla (Mexico)
- Petén–Veracruz moist forests (Mexico)
- Sierra de los Tuxtlas (Mexico)
- Sierra Madre de Chiapas moist forests (El Salvador, Guatemala, Mexico)
- Talamancan montane forests (Costa Rica, Panama)
- Veracruz moist forests (Mexico)
- Veracruz montane forests (Mexico)
- Yucatán moist forests (Belize, Guatemala, Mexico)

=== Tropical and subtropical dry broadleaf forests ===
- Bajío dry forests (Mexico)
- Balsas dry forests (Mexico)
- Central American dry forests (Costa Rica, El Salvador, Guatemala, Honduras, Mexico, Nicaragua)
- Chiapas Depression dry forests (Guatemala, Mexico)
- Jalisco dry forests (Mexico)
- Panamanian dry forests (Panama)
- Revillagigedo Islands dry forests (Mexico)
- Sierra de la Laguna dry forests (Mexico)
- Sinaloan dry forests (Mexico)
- Southern Pacific dry forests (Mexico)
- Veracruz dry forests (Mexico)
- Yucatán dry forests (Mexico)

=== Tropical and subtropical coniferous forests ===
- Belizean pine forests (Belize)
- Central American pine–oak forests (El Salvador, Guatemala, Honduras, Mexico, Nicaragua)
- Miskito pine forests (Honduras, Nicaragua)
- Sierra de la Laguna pine–oak forests (Mexico)
- Sierra Madre de Oaxaca pine–oak forests (Mexico)
- Sierra Madre del Sur pine–oak forests (Mexico)
- Trans-Mexican Volcanic Belt pine–oak forests (Mexico)

=== Tropical and subtropical grasslands, savannas, and shrublands ===
- Clipperton Island shrub and grasslands (Clipperton Island is an overseas territory of France)

=== Flooded grasslands and savannas ===
- Central Mexican wetlands (Mexico)

=== Montane grasslands and shrublands ===
- Talamancan páramo (Costa Rica)
- Zacatonal (Mexico)

=== Deserts and xeric shrublands ===
- Motagua Valley thornscrub (Guatemala)
- San Lucan xeric scrub (Mexico)
- Tehuacán Valley matorral (Mexico)

=== Mangrove ===
- Alvarado mangroves (Mexico)
- Belizean Coast mangroves (Belize)
- Belizean reef mangroves (Belize)
- Bocas del Toro–San Bastimentos Island–San Blas mangroves (Costa Rica, Panama)
- Gulf of Fonseca mangroves (El Salvador, Honduras, Nicaragua)
- Gulf of Panama mangroves (Panama)
- Marismas Nacionales–San Blas mangroves (Mexico)
- Mayan Corridor mangroves (Mexico)
- Mexican South Pacific Coast mangroves (Mexico)
- Moist Pacific Coast mangroves (Costa Rica, Panama)
- Mosquitia–Nicaraguan Caribbean Coast mangroves (Costa Rica, Honduras, Nicaragua)
- Northern Dry Pacific Coast mangroves (El Salvador, Guatemala)
- Northern Honduras mangroves (Guatemala, Honduras)
- Petenes mangroves (Mexico)
- Ría Lagartos mangroves (Mexico)
- Rio Negro–Rio San Sun mangroves (Costa Rica, Nicaragua)
- Southern Dry Pacific Coast mangroves (Costa Rica, Nicaragua)
- Tehuantepec–El Manchón mangroves (Mexico)
- Usumacinta mangroves (Mexico)
