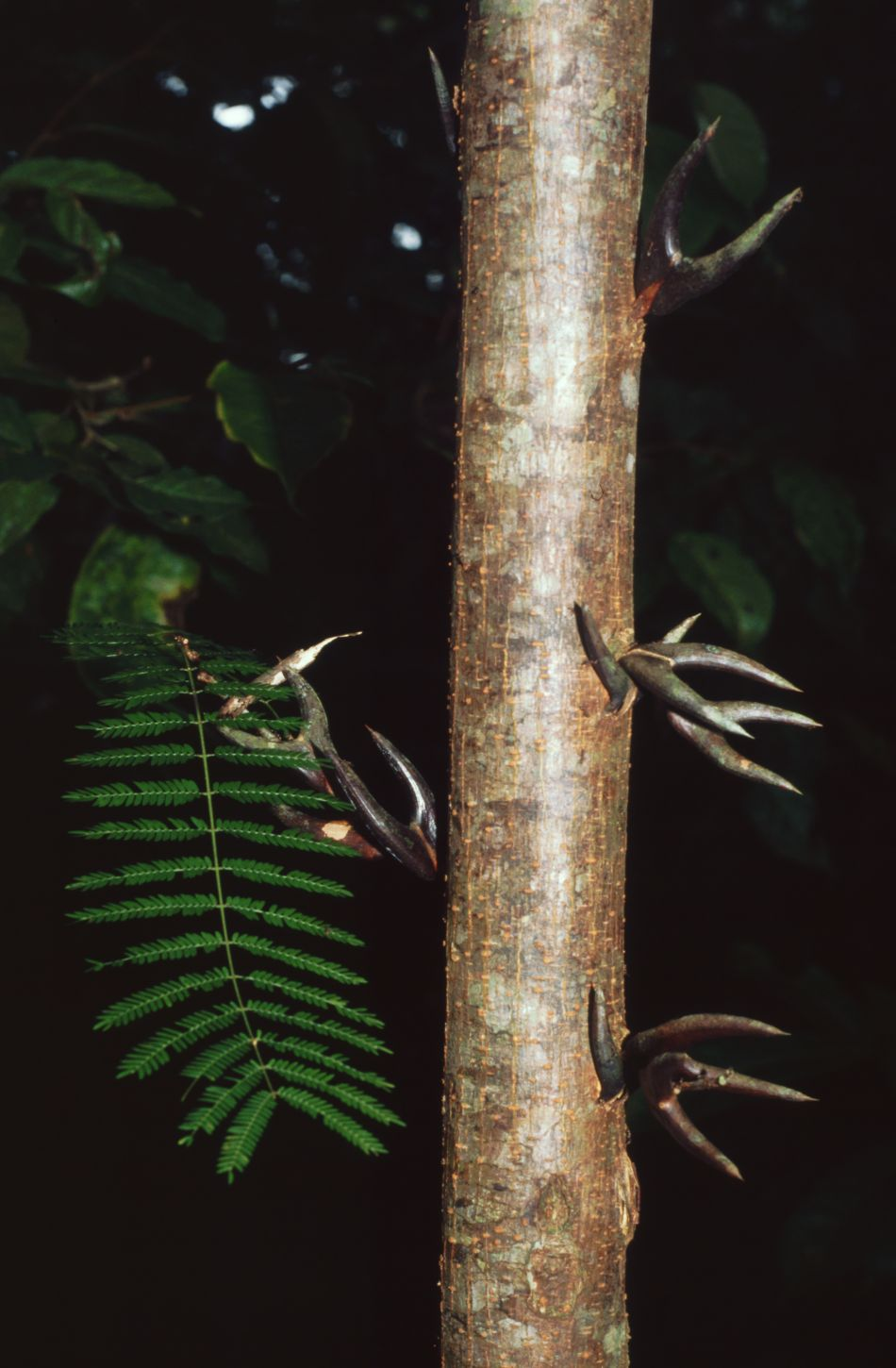

Conservation status
- Near Threatened (IUCN 3.1)

Scientific classification
- Kingdom: Plantae
- Clade: Tracheophytes
- Clade: Angiosperms
- Clade: Eudicots
- Clade: Rosids
- Order: Fabales
- Family: Fabaceae
- Subfamily: Caesalpinioideae
- Clade: Mimosoid clade
- Genus: Vachellia
- Species: V. allenii

Binomial name
- Vachellia allenii (D.H.Janzen) Seigler & Ebinger

Synonyms
- Acacia alleni D.H.Janzen

= Vachellia allenii =

Species of flowering plant

Vachellia allenii, commonly known as ant acacia is a species of flowering plant in the family Fabaceae. It is a tree with thorns, compound leaves, and dehiscent seed pods. It is symbiotic with ants of the genus Pseudomyrmex.

Vachellia allenii is endemic to Costa Rica. It was described in 1974, and named for Paul H. Allen. The species is listed as near threatened by the IUCN.

== Taxonomy ==
The species was described by Daniel H. Janzen in 1974, and placed in the genus Acacia. In 2006, David Stanley Seigler and John Edwin Ebinger moved the species to Vachellia. This was part of a broader taxonomic revision of Acacia, published in the journal Phytologia.

The type specimen was collected in 1967.

== Distribution ==
Vachellia allenii is native to the wet tropical biome of Puntarenas, Costa Rica. It is endemic to the south-west of the country, and is mainly present in Osa Peninsula and Golfito.

The species grows in primary, secondary, riparian lowland, and disturbed forests, at elevations of up to 800 metres (2,600 ft).

== Description ==
Vachellia allenii is a tree with widely spreading branches, that can grow up to 22 metres (72 ft) high. The species is resistant to light ground fires. The bark is green to light brown, and rough.

The leaves are compound, very dark green, and 20–40 centimetres (7.9–15.7 in) long. Each leaf has up to forty segments, which are 7–10 centimetres (2.8–3.9 in) long. The leaves have beltian bodies. The inflorescences are globular, up to 5 millimetres (0.20 in) long and wide, and grow on 3–7 millimetres (0.12–0.28 in) stems.

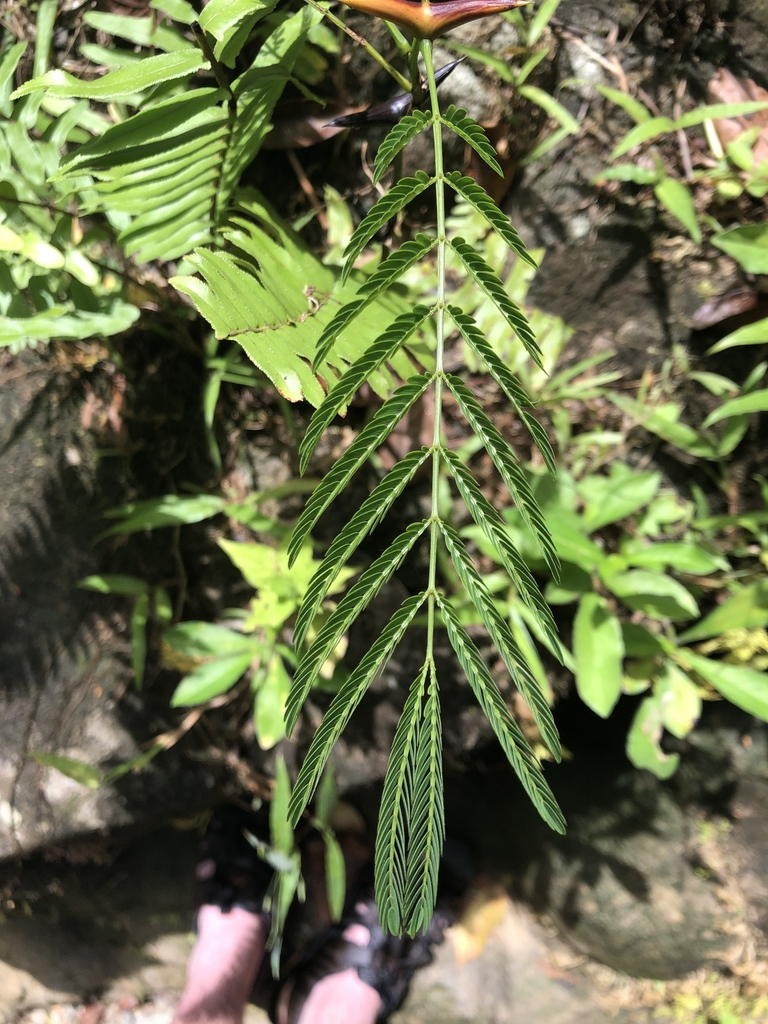
Vachellia allenii leaves

Vachellia allenii lives for around twenty-five years, and first produces seeds at around seven years. The seed pods are dehiscent, and greenish-black when mature. The seeds are black.

Vachellia allenii is a myrmecophyte, symbiotic with stinging ants. Ant species such as Pseudomyrmex ferruginea and Pseudomyrmex particeps live in the tree, though the tree will support other species if they are artificially introduced. The ants protect the tree from herbivores.

Vachellia allenii is part of the swollen-thorn Vachellia group. It has thorns up to 4 centimetres (1.6 in) long. The thorns of trees occupied by ants are dark brown or black in colour.

V. allenii is similar to Vachellia melanoceras, and the species are likely to be closely related. The species differ in their geographic range, and the details of their foliage and thorns. They are also colonised by different species of ants.

== Conservation ==
In 2020, the IUCN assessed Vachellia allenii as near threatened. The main threats are logging and forest clearance.

No specific conservation measures are in place for Vachellia allenii. The species is present in protected areas, including Corcovado National Park, Golfito Mixed Wildlife Refuge, Piedras Blancas National Park, Golfo Dulce Forest Reserve, Los Santos Forest Reserve, and Portalón Mixed Wildlife Refuge.

== Names ==
The specific epithet allenii refers to Paul H. Allen, who collected the first specimen.

In Spanish, the species is known as cornizuelo.
