= Peñitas =

Peñitas refers to:

- Peñitas, Texas
- Las Peñitas, Nicaragua
