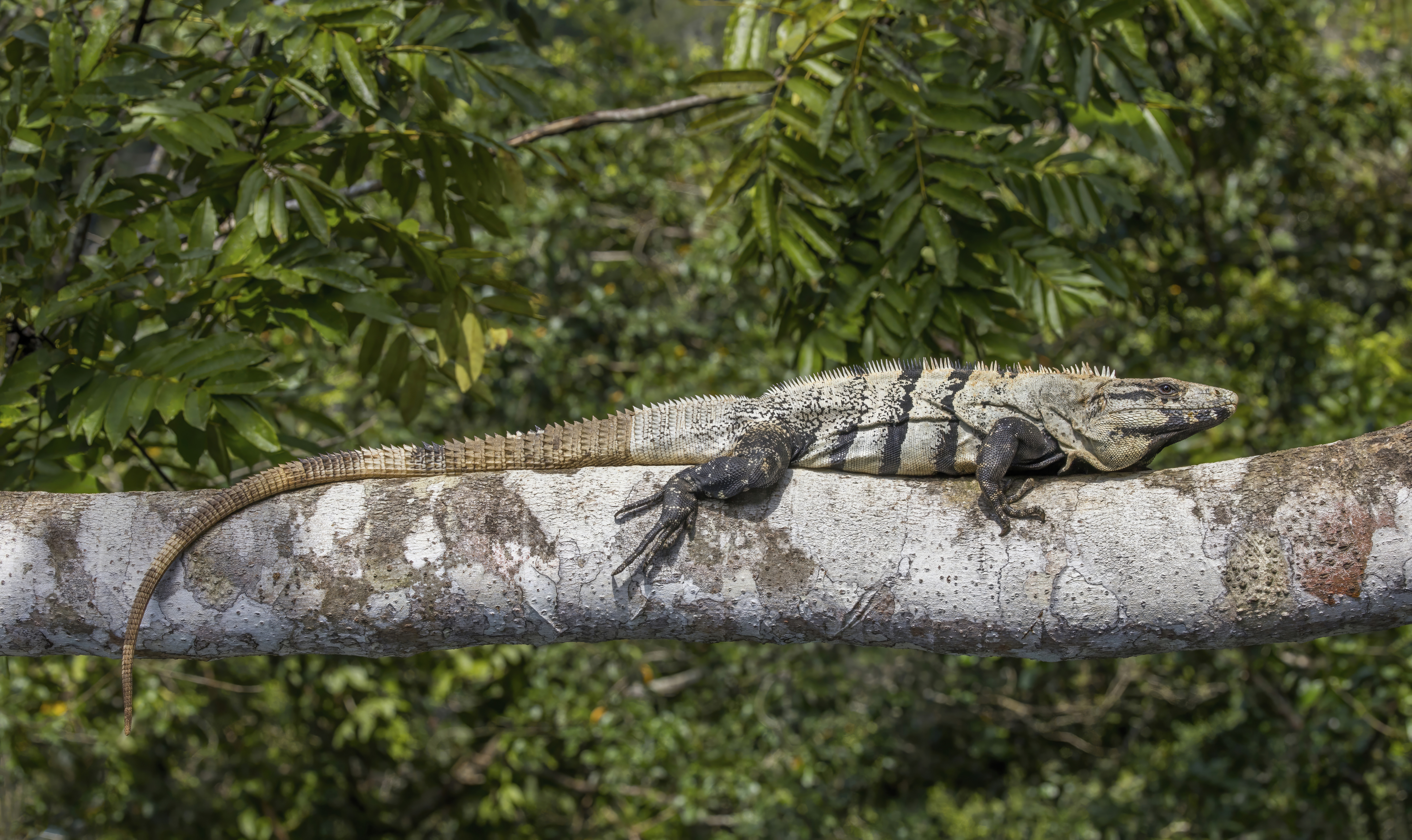
- In Belize

Conservation status
- Least Concern (IUCN 3.1)
- CITES Appendix II

Scientific classification
- Kingdom: Animalia
- Phylum: Chordata
- Class: Reptilia
- Order: Squamata
- Suborder: Iguania
- Family: Iguanidae
- Genus: Ctenosaura
- Species: C. similis

Binomial name
- Ctenosaura similis (Gray, 1831)
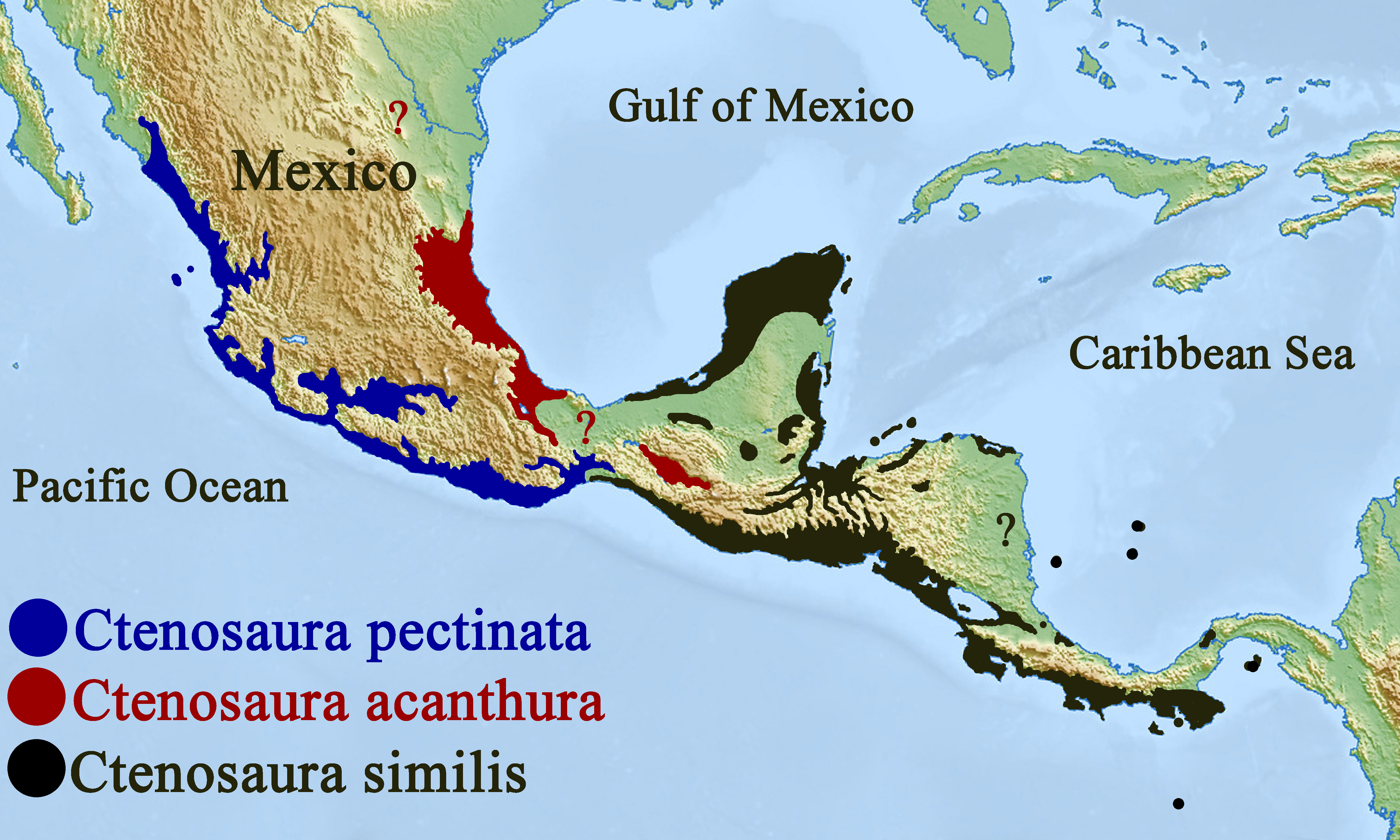

Synonyms
- Iguana similis Gray, 1831; Ctenosaura completa Bocourt, 1874; Ctenosaura similis – Bailey, 1928

= Ctenosaura similis =

Black iguana, native to central America

Ctenosaura similis, commonly known as the black iguana or black spiny-tailed iguana, is an iguanid lizard native to Mexico and Central America. It has been reported in some Colombian islands in the Caribbean Sea and Pacific Ocean, and has been introduced to the United States in the state of Florida. The largest species in the genus Ctenosaura, it is commonly found in areas such as grasslands and forests.

== Taxonomy ==
C. similis was first described by British zoologist John Edward Gray in 1831. The generic name—Ctenosaura—is derived from two Greek words: ctenos (Κτενός), meaning "comb" (referring to the comblike spines on the lizard's back and tail), and saura (σαύρα), meaning "lizard". The specific name—similis—is a Latin word meaning "similar to", a common description found in Linnaean taxonomy when referring to a new taxon.

== Distribution ==
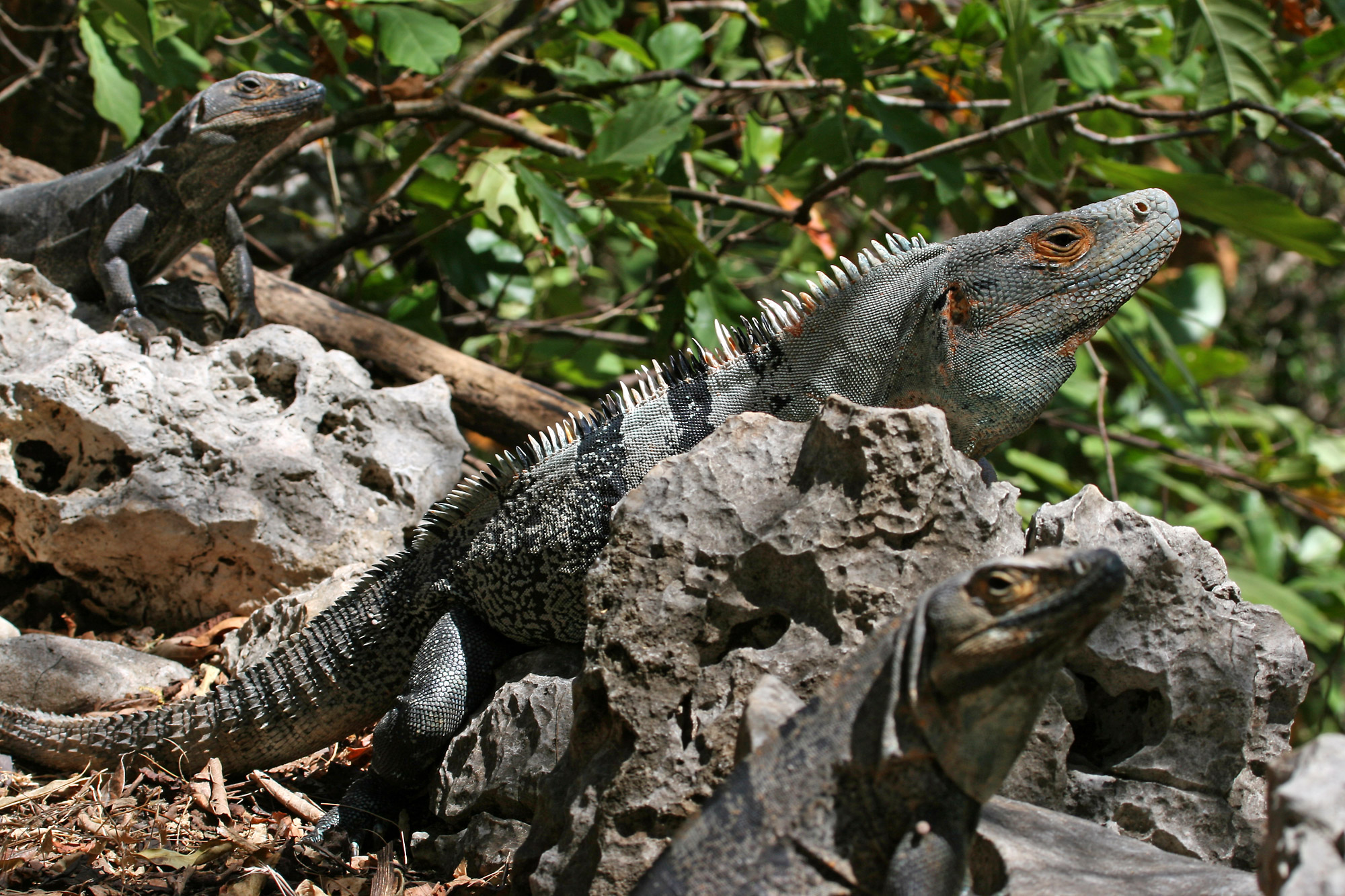
In Costa Rica

The black spiny-tailed iguana is native to southern Mexico and Central America, ranging from the Isthmus of Tehuantepec southward to Panama, occurring at sea level to ca. 1,320 meters elevation, but it is absent from interior highlands. Its distribution is irregular and discontinuous on the Atlantic versant where it ranges through portions of Tabasco, northern Chiapas, Campeche, Yucatan, and Quintana Roo in Mexico, much of Belize, Guatemala, and the northern coast of Honduras (often following rivers into interior valleys and canyons), but with only a few isolated and disjunct records southward in eastern Nicaragua, Costa Rica, and Panama. On the Pacific coast its distribution is continuous from extreme southeast Oaxaca and southern Chiapas, Mexico, south through Guatemala, El Salvador, Honduras, Nicaragua, Costa Rica, to the Azuero Peninsula in Panama.

It is also found on many Caribbean and Pacific islands including: Isla Aguada, Isla Contoy, Cozumel, and Isla Mujeres in Mexico; Ambergris Caye, Glover's Reef, Half Moon Caye, Belize; Isla de Utila, Guanaja, Roatán, and the islands in the Golfo de Fonseca, Honduras; Isla de Maíz Grande (Corn Islands) Nicaragua; Coiba Island and Isla del Rey, Panamá; Isla San Andrés and Providencia, Colombia. Its status on a few of these islands, as a native or invasive species is questionable. Some herpetologist presume dispersal to the Islas San Andrés and Providencia, Colombia occurred in the Quaternary, while another suspects these and some other insular populations are "likely" human introductions. It has been introduced and is now established in southern Florida, a few islands in the Bahamas, Malpelo Island, Colombia, and Venezuela.

=== Introduction in Florida ===
The black spiny-tailed iguana has been introduced to South Florida and reproduces in the wild in several feral populations. On the southwestern Florida coast, it has been discovered from Collier County north to Tampa Bay. On the southeastern Florida coast, black spiny-tailed iguanas have been found on Key Biscayne, Hialeah, and in Broward County. As this species will opportunistically feed on small vertebrates, such as fish, rodents, eggs, birds, and even hatchling sea turtles it may pose a threat to endangered native species. These iguanas can thrive in both natural and disturbed areas, making them even more of a threat to native species.

== Description ==
C. similis has distinctive black, keeled scales on its tail, which gives it its common name. It is the largest member of the genus Ctenosaura. The males are capable of growing up to 1.3 meters (4 ft 3 in) in length and the females are slightly shorter, at 0.8–1 meter (2 ft 7 in – 3 ft 3 in). They have a crest of long spines which extends down the center of the back. Although coloration varies extremely among individuals of the same population, adults usually have a whitish gray or tan ground color with a series of 4–12 well-defined dark dorsal bands that extend nearly to the ventral scales. Males also develop an orange color around the head and throat during breeding season with highlights of blue and peach on their jowls.

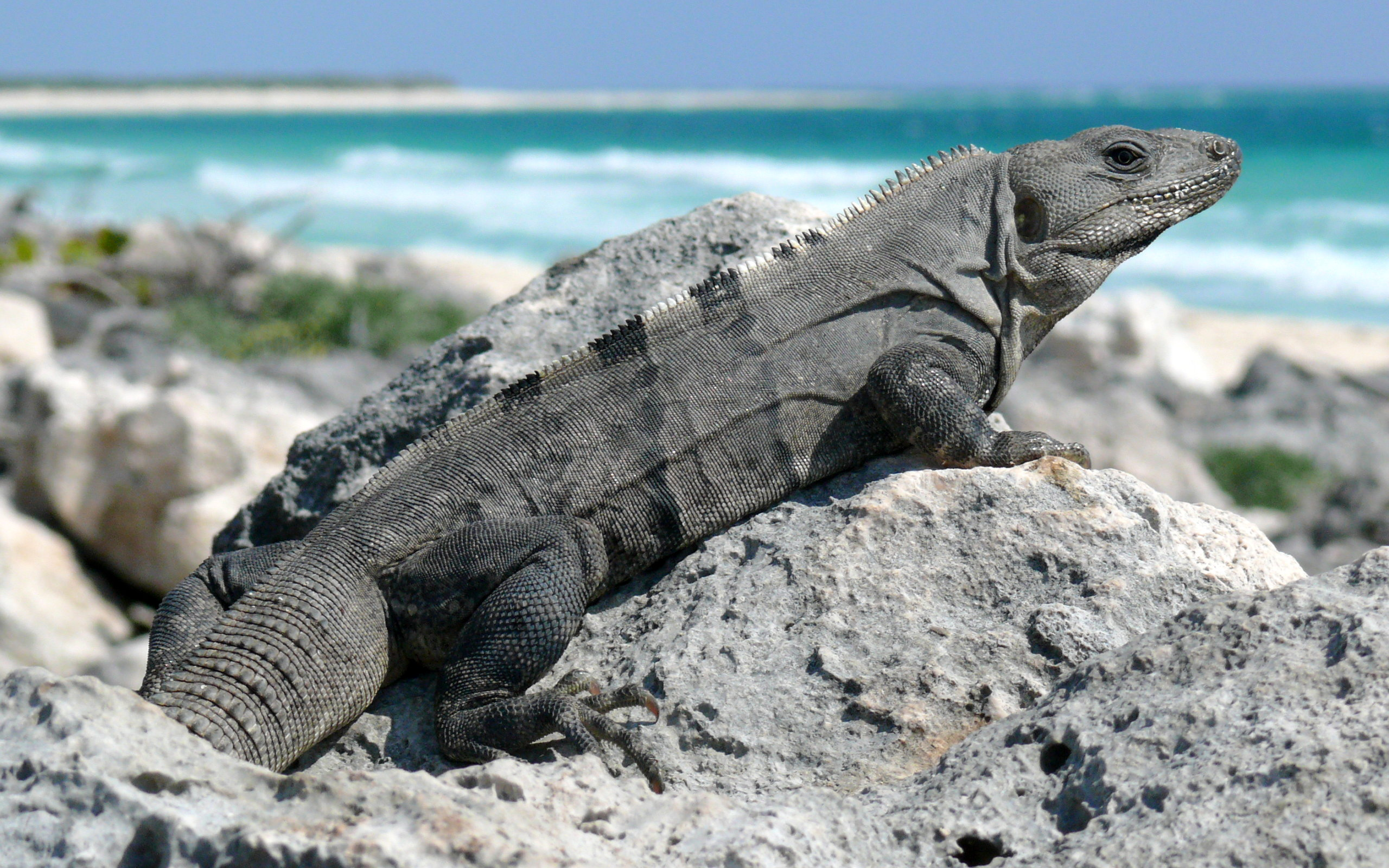
A basking female on the island of Cozumel in Quintana Roo, Mexico

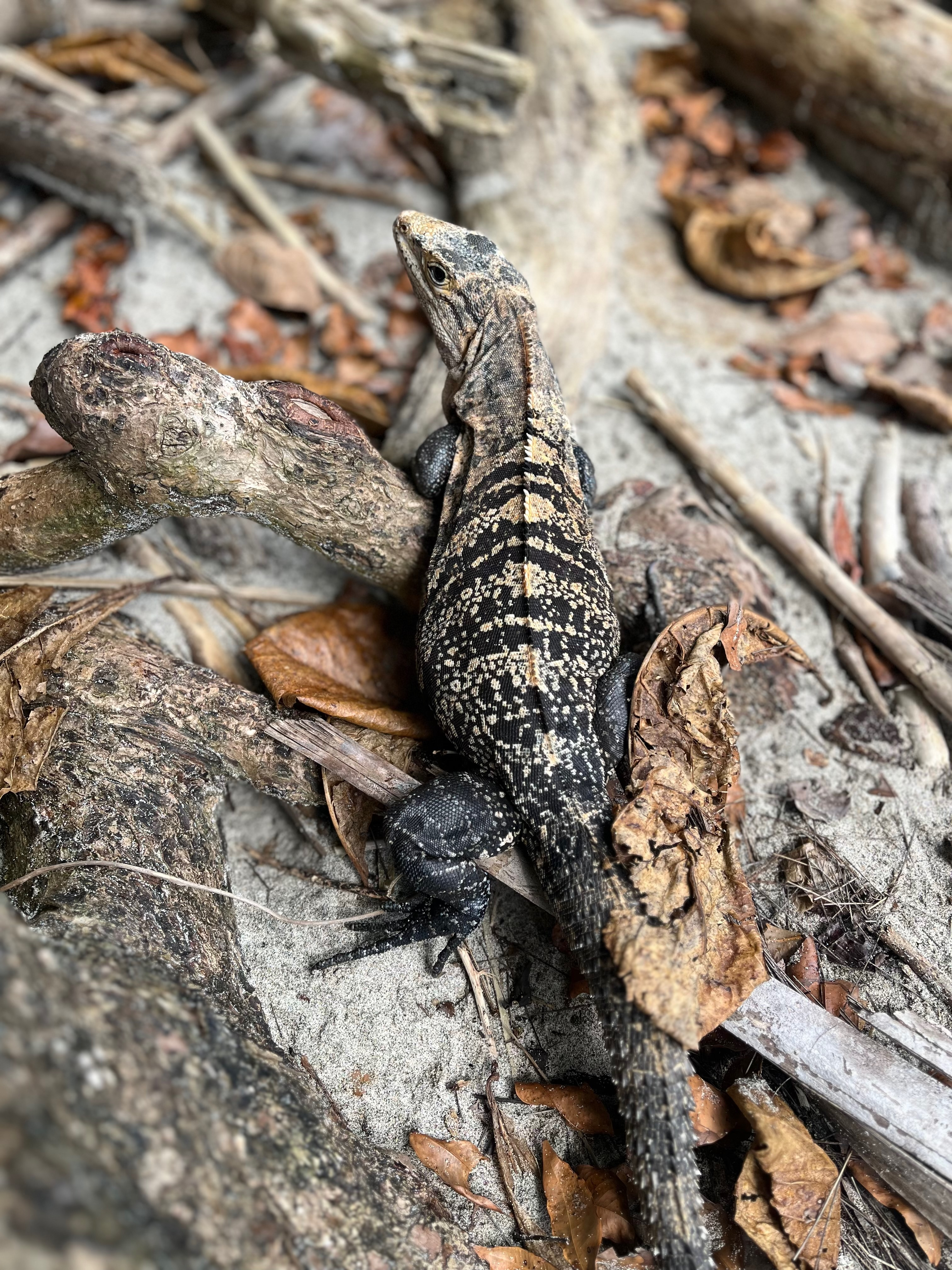
Female, in Manuel Antonio National Park

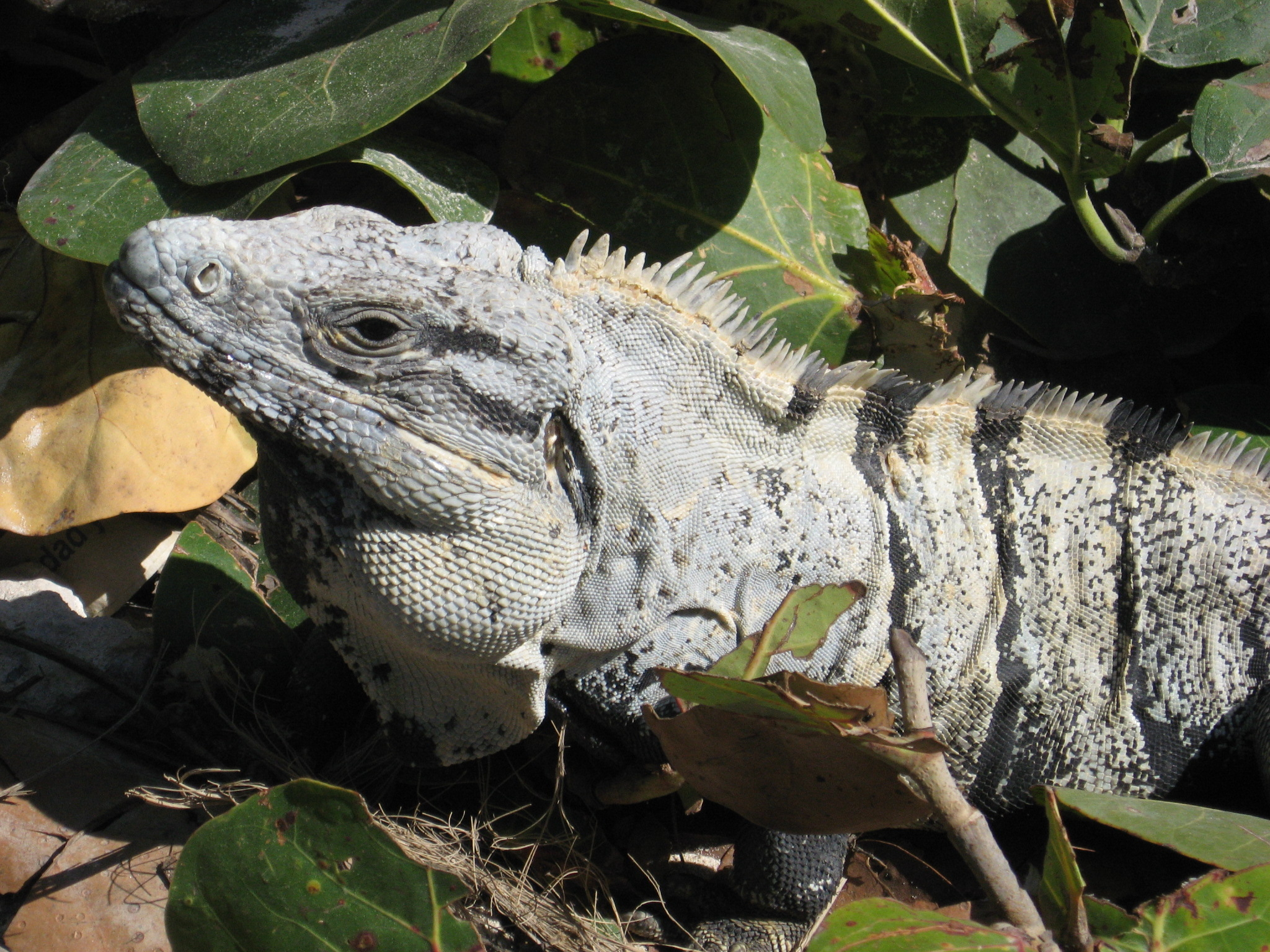
Male, in Tulum

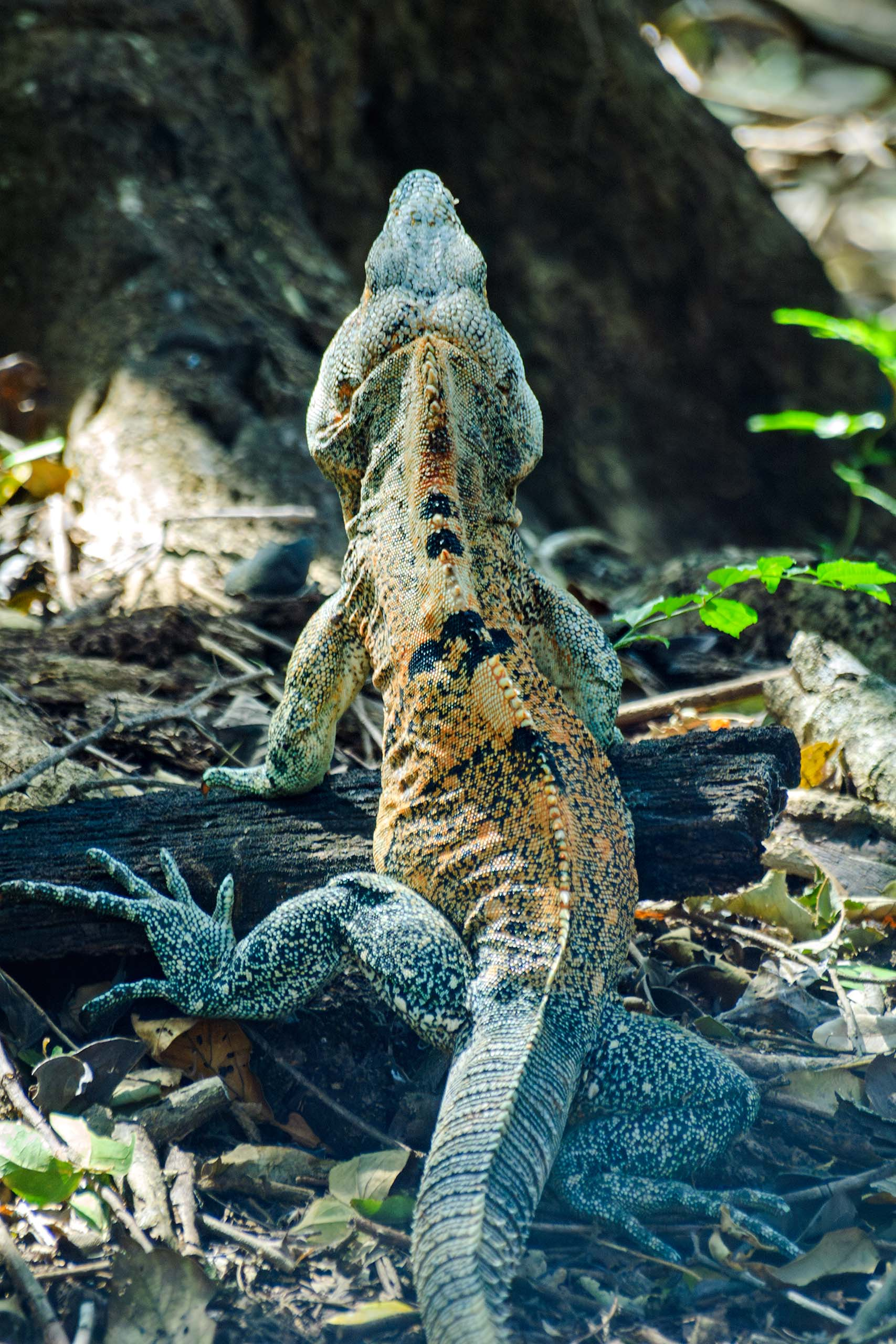
Ctenosaura similis - Spiny-tailed iguana seen on its back, Santa Rosa National Park, Costa Rica

== Diet and behavior ==
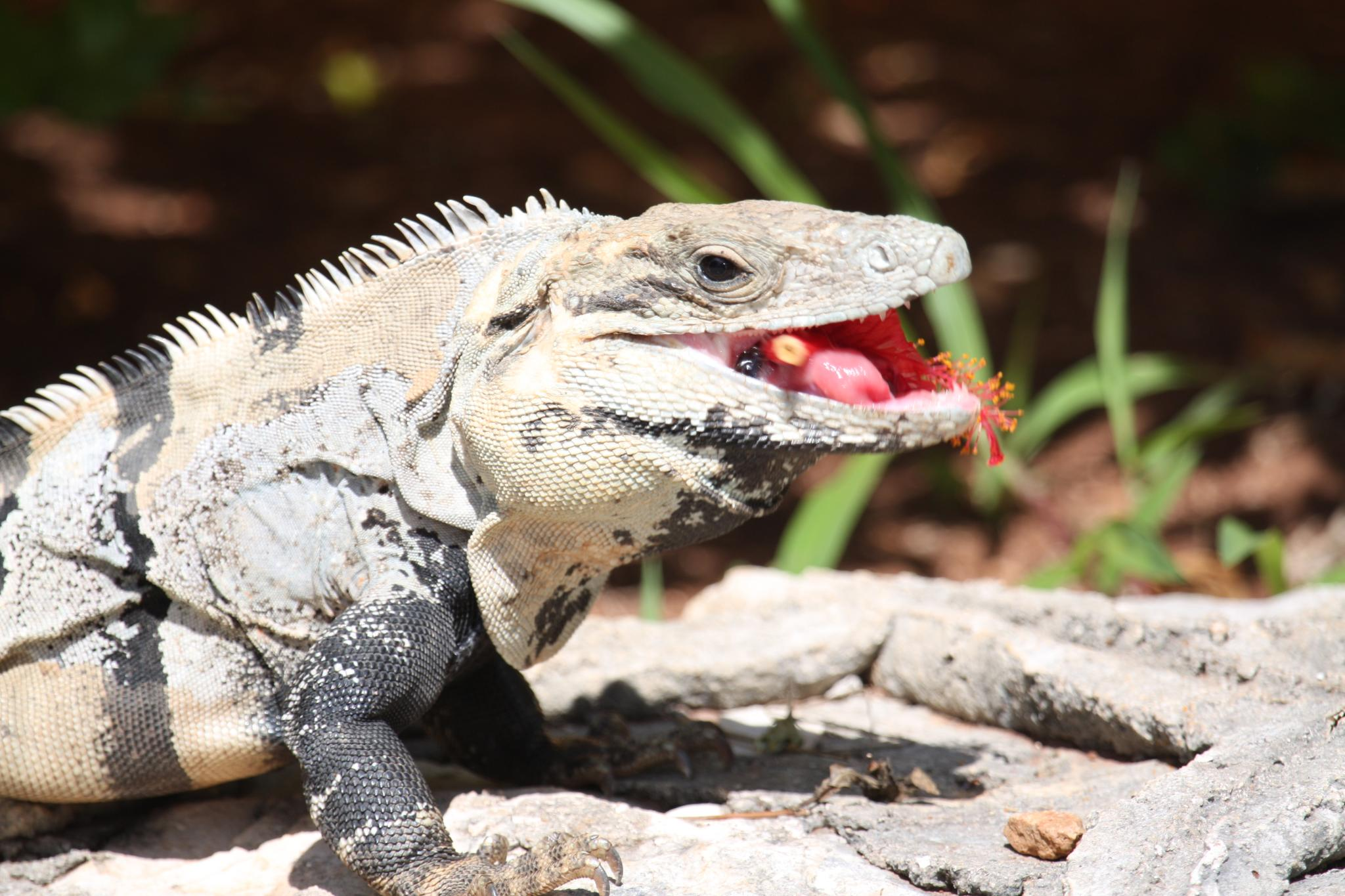
Eating a flower, in southern Mexico

Black spiny-tailed iguanas are excellent climbers, and prefer a rocky habitat with plenty of crevices to hide in, rocks to bask on, and nearby trees to climb. They are diurnal and fast moving, employing their speed to escape predators but will lash with their tails and bite if cornered. The Guinness Book of World Records lists this as the world's fastest lizard, with a maximal sprint speed of 34.6 kilometres per hour (21.5 mph).

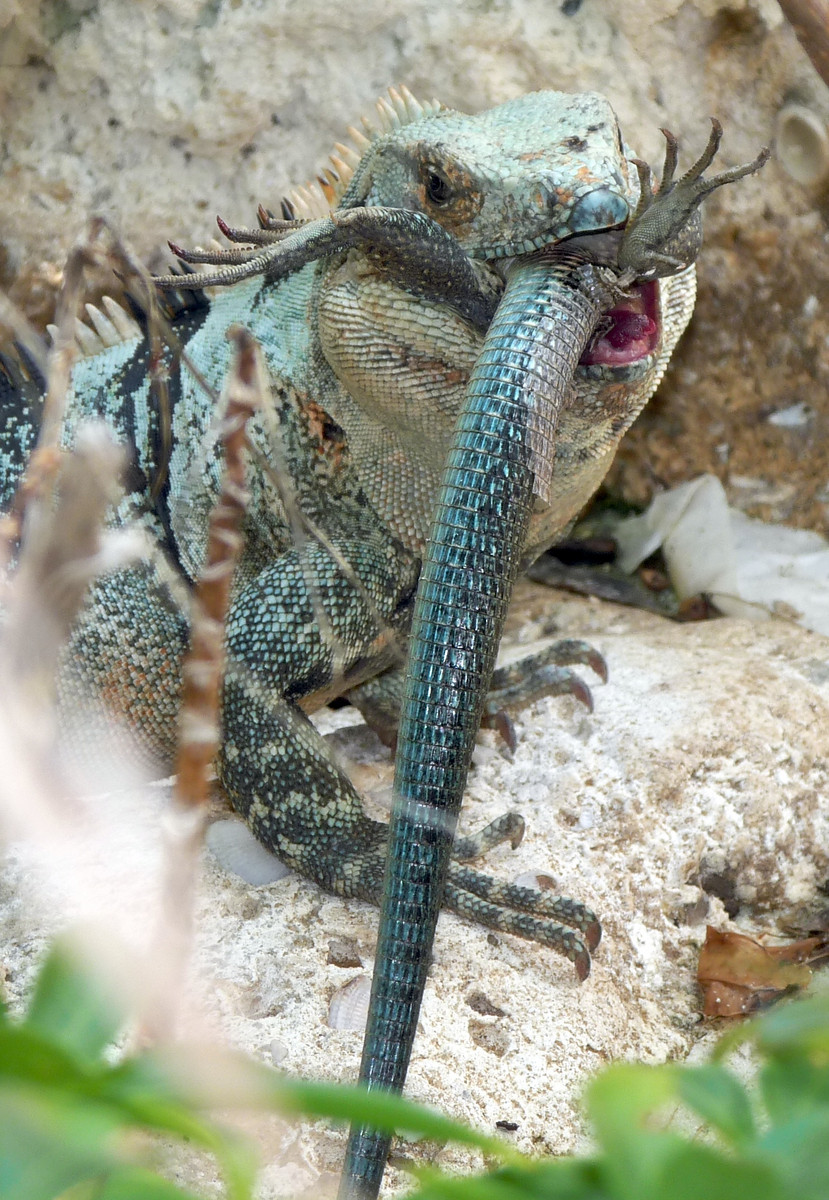
Cannibalism, in Florida

They are primarily herbivorous, eating flowers, leaves, stems, and fruit, but they will opportunistically eat smaller animals (rodents, bats, frogs, small birds and smaller iguanas), eggs and arthropods. Juveniles tend to be insectivores, becoming more herbivorous as they get older. They are known to eat the fruit and live in the limbs of the manchineel, a tree highly poisonous to most other animals. González-García et al. 2009 find that abundance is highly dependent on 3 dimensional structure of landscape, tall vegetation not merely short grass.

== Reproduction ==
Mating generally occurs in the beginning of the dry season. Males court females and show interest with low amplitude head bobbing and flick-licking the female. The female, when receptive, will allow mating with a large male. Females may violently reject forced-copulation attempts. Within eight to ten weeks, females will travel to a communal nesting site. There they, and other females, repeatedly visit nest openings, eventually laying clutches of up to 30 eggs. The eggs hatch in 90 days with the hatchlings digging their way out of the sand. These juveniles are typically green with brown markings, although all brown hatchlings have been recorded as well. Juveniles become reproductively mature around 2–3 years old.

== Commercial usage ==
In some parts of Central America, the black spiny-tailed iguana, colloquially called the "chicken of the trees," is farmed alongside the green iguana as a food source and for export for the pet trade (see iguana meat). Although it is heavily hunted it does not appear to be endangered in any of its native territory.

== Gallery ==
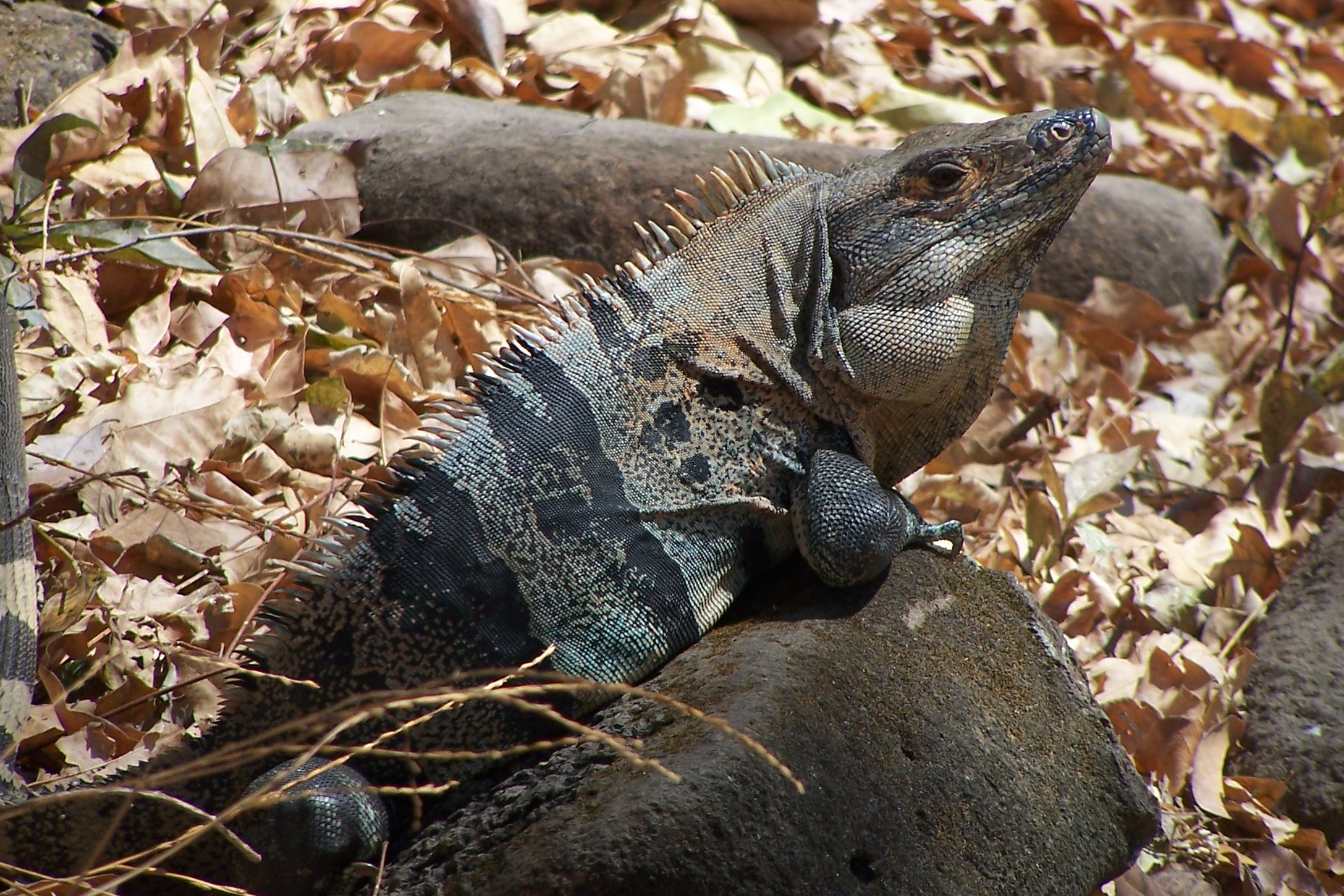
An adult male iguana basking in Santa Rosa National Park, Costa Rica

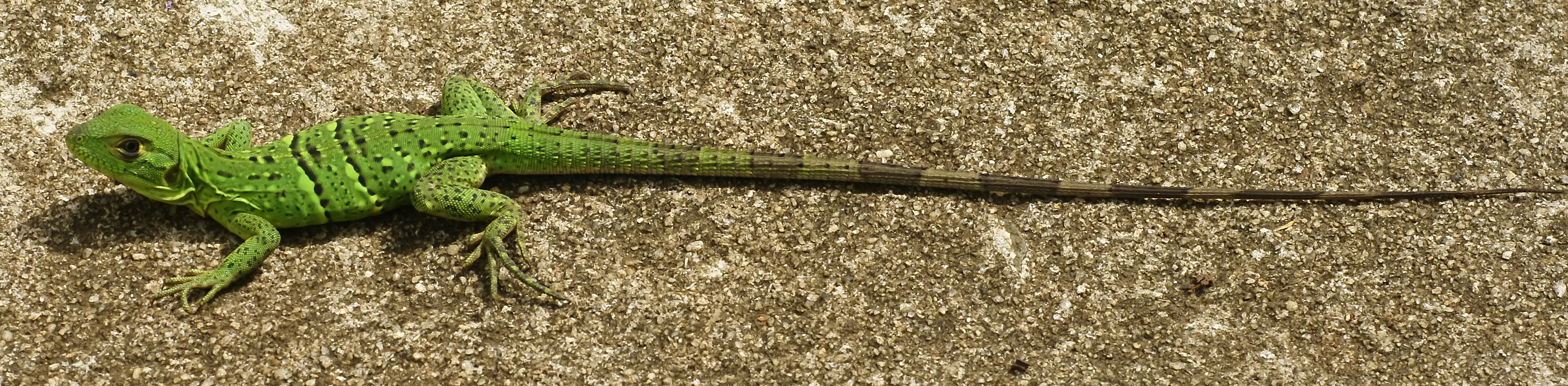
A juvenile from Rincon de la Vieja, Costa Rica
