= Poneloya, Nicaragua =

Town in Nicaragua

Poneloya
- Town
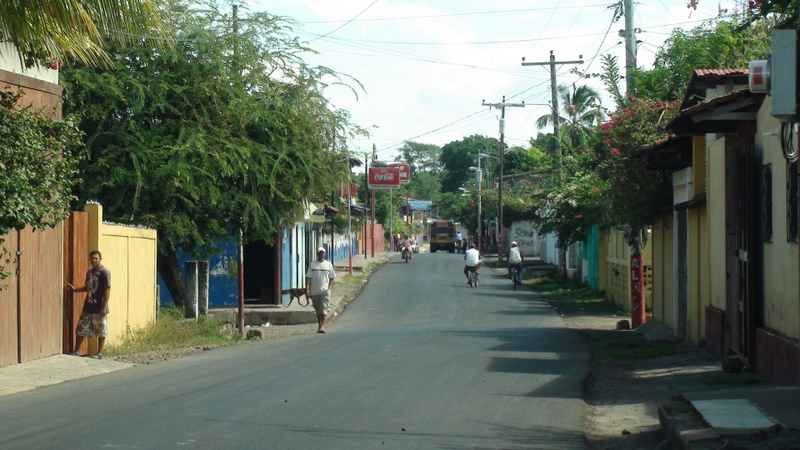
- A street in Poneloya, Nicaragua.

- Location within Nicaragua
- Coordinates: 12°22′21″N 87°2′27″W
- Country: Nicaragua
- Department: León Department

Population (2017)
  - Total: 4,232
- Time zone: UTC-6 (Central (CST))

Poneloya is a town on the west coast of Nicaragua bordering the Pacific Ocean. It lies within the León Department and borders Las Peñitas, Nicaragua. Poneloya is about 21 kilometers (13 mi) from the city of León. The town is a vacation home area for wealthy Nicaraguans, while local residents are mostly fishermen, caretakers, or those who commute to León for work..

Poneloya offers beaches that stretch for several kilometers with clear blue waters. Popular activities include sunbathing, swimming, and water sports such as surfing and fishing. The town itself is small, with colorful houses, local restaurants, and beachfront accommodations. Poneloya is known for its fresh seafood, and dishes such as ceviche and grilled fish.

Nearby attractions include the historic city of León, known for its colonial architecture and cultural heritage, as well as the nearby Juan Venado Island Nature Reserve, a protected area rich in mangroves and wildlife.

== Etymology ==
The name Poneloya means “small seeds” in the indigenous language..

== Climate, geography and ecology ==
Daily temperatures range from 32°C to over 40°C (89°F to over 104°F). During the night, the temperature is reduced to about 25°C to 30°C (77°F to 86°F). Due to its location near the sea, winds and breezes flow through the town, making the climate cooler.

Several volcanoes exist near the town, including Cerro Negro, Telica, San Cristóbal, Las Pilas, and El Hoyo.

There is a large diversity of fish, crabs, and shrimp in the water, which are harvested by small scale fishing operations.

== Transportation ==
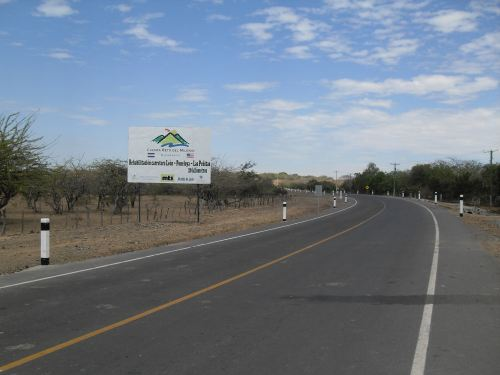
A new road in Poneloya.

A regular bus service leaves every hour from the Sutiaba market in León.

== Tourism ==
A sunset at Poneloya beach.

A surf school in Poneloya.

Vacationers from other countries visit the area mostly during the northern hemisphere winter/southern hemisphere summer. Peak travel dates are the Christmas period until the end of January, the school vacation holidays in Nicaragua, and the week of Easter..
