= Rancho La Merced Mixed Wildlife Refuge =

Protected area in Costa Rica

- Refugio de Vida Silvestre Mixto Rancho La Merced
- IUCN category IV (habitat/species management area)
- Location within Costa Rica
- Location: Costa Rica
- Coordinates: 9.182°N 83.763°W
- Area: 4.10 square kilometres (1.58 sq mi)
- Established: 6 October 1995
- Governing body: National System of Conservation Areas (SINAC)

Rancho La Merced Mixed Wildlife Refuge (Spanish: Refugio de Vida Silvestre Mixto Rancho La Merced), is a protected area in Costa Rica, managed under the Osa Conservation Area, it was created in 1995 by decree 24638-MIRENEM.
