= Carate Mixed Wildlife Refuge =

Protected area in Costa Rica

- Refugio de Vida Silvestre Mixto Carate
- Location within Costa Rica
- Location: Costa Rica
- Coordinates: 8.448°N 83.468°W
- Area: 1.41 square kilometres (0.54 sq mi)
- Established: 14 December 1998
- Governing body: National System of Conservation Areas (SINAC)

Carate Mixed Wildlife Refuge (Spanish: Refugio de Vida Silvestre Mixto Carate), is a protected area in Costa Rica, managed under the Osa Conservation Area, it was created in 1998 by decree 27471-MINAE.
