= Moist Pacific Coast mangroves =

Ecoregion in Costa Rica and Panama

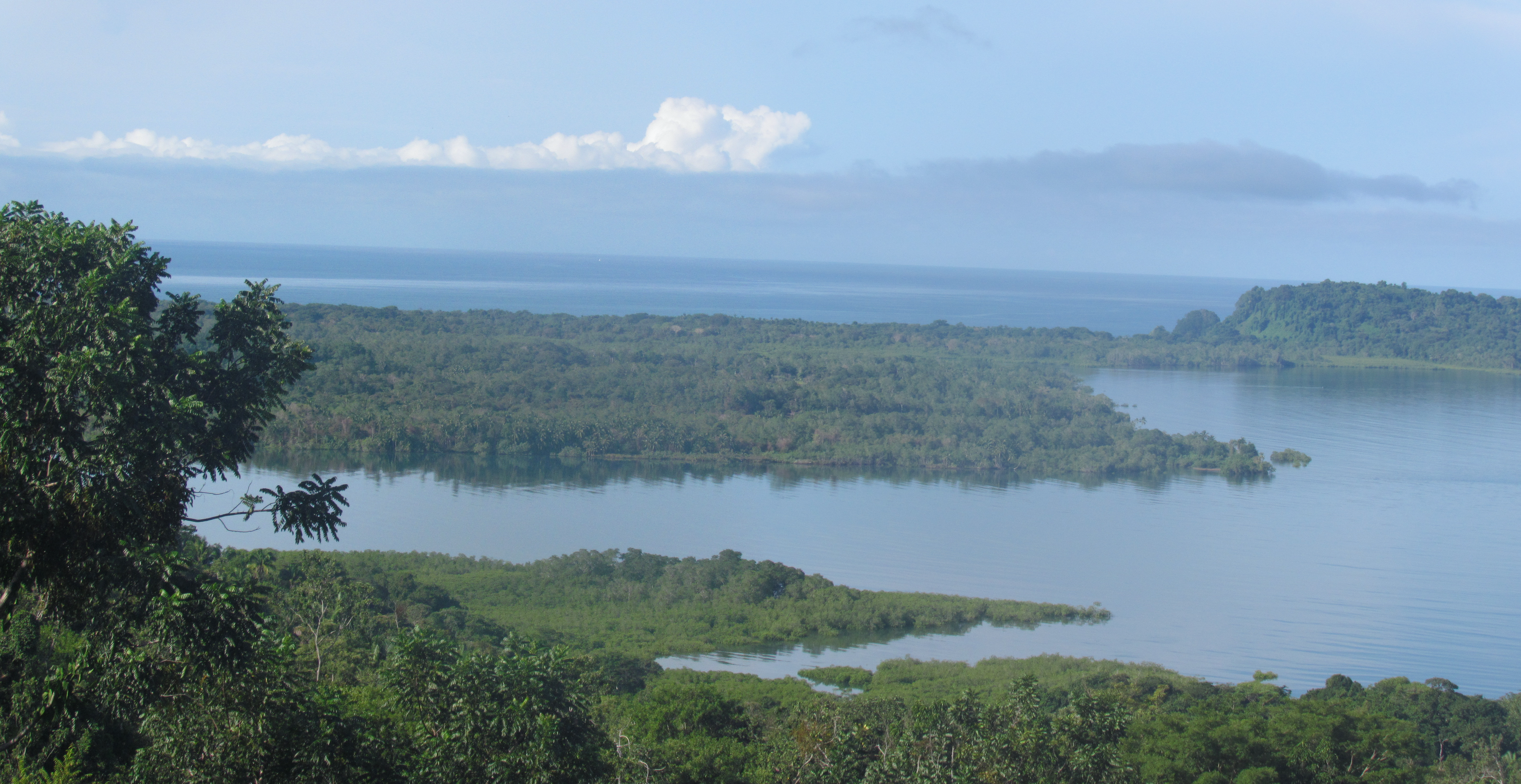
- Mangroves south of Tolé, Panama

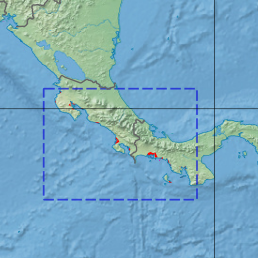
- Ecoregion territory (in red)

Ecology
- Realm: Neotropic
- Biome: Mangroves
- Borders: Costa Rican seasonal moist forests; Isthmian–Pacific moist forests

Geography
- Area: 1,550 km^{2} (600 sq mi)
- Country: Costa Rica, Panama
- Coordinates: 8.2°N 81.75°W

The Moist Pacific Coast mangroves ecoregion (WWF ID:NT1423) covers a series of disconnected mangrove sites along the Pacific Ocean coast of Costa Rica and Panama. These sites occur mostly on coastal flatlands around lagoons, particularly where rivers from the inland mountains reach the sea, bringing fresh water to the coastal forests. The area is in a transition zone from the drier coastline to the north; rainfall in this ecoregions is over 2,000 mm/year, and reaches over 3,600 mm/year at the southern end.

== Location and description ==
The mangroves of this ecoregion are found along a 500 km stretch of coastline, from Jacó, Costa Rica to southwest corner of the Azuero Peninsula in Panama. The mangroves extend inland only a few kilometers where the saltwater influence changes to freshwater. The surrounding ecoregion is the Isthmian–Pacific moist forests ecoregion. Specific mangrove sites include:

- Jacó, Costa Rica, a small area south of town
- Isla Damas, with mangroves around the estuary
- Térraba-Sierpe Wetland, a RAMSAR wetland of international importance, where the Sierpe River and Térraba River meet at the coast
- Golfo Dulce, Costa Rica, at the eastern end of the Costa Rican coast
- Gulf of Chiriquí, at the western end of the Panamanian coast
- Coiba Island, offshore from the Gulf of Montijo
- Montijo District and the surrounding margins of the Gulf of Montijo, a RAMSAR wetland of international importance.

== Climate ==
The climate of the ecoregion is Tropical monsoon climate (Köppen climate classification (Am)). This climate is characterized by relatively even temperatures throughout the year (all months being greater than 18 °C (64 °F) average temperature), and a pronounced dry season. The driest month has less than 60 mm of precipitation, but more than (100-(average/25) mm. This climate is mid-way between a tropical rainforest and a tropical savannah. The dry month usually at or right after the winter solstice in the Northern Hemisphere.

== Flora and fauna ==
The mangroves in this ecoregion are more fully developed than those farther north, both because of the higher precipitation and because of the greater amounts of freshwater and sediments received from the runoff of the Talamanca Mountain Range immediately inland. Mangrove trees in the ecoregion include red mangrove (Rhizophora mangle), Rhizophora harrisonii, Rhizophora racemosa, black mangrove (Avicennia germinans), Avicennia bicolor, Avicennia tonduzii, white mangrove (Laguncularia racemosa), and tea mangrove (Pelliciera rhizophorae) Associated species include the mangrove fern (Acrostichum aureum) and Tabebuia palustris.

The mangrove hummingbird (Amazilia boucardi) and yellow-billed cotinga (Carpodectes antoniae) are endemic to the ecoregion.

== Protected areas ==
Officially protected areas in the ecoregion include:

- Piedras Blancas National Park
- Térraba-Sierpe Wetland
- Golfito Mixed Wildlife Refuge
- Gulf of Chiriquí National Marine Park
- Coiba National Park
- Humedales del Golfo de Montijo
