= Pejeperro Wildlife Refuge =

Protected area in Costa Rica

- Refugio de Vida Silvestre Pejeperro
- Location within Costa Rica
- Location: Costa Rica
- Coordinates: 8.415°N 83.406°W
- Area: 7.63 square kilometres (2.95 sq mi) (terrestrial), 19.86 square kilometres (7.67 sq mi) (marine)
- Established: 5 April 2000
- Governing body: National System of Conservation Areas (SINAC)

Pejeperro Wildlife Refuge (Spanish: Refugio de Vida Silvestre Pejeperro), is a protected area in Costa Rica, managed under the Osa Conservation Area, it was created in 2000 by decree 28550-MINAE.
