= Punta Río Claro Mixed Wildlife Refuge =

Protected area in Costa Rica

- Refugio de Vida Silvestre Mixto Punta Río Claro
- IUCN category IV (habitat/species management area)
- Location within Costa Rica
- Location: Costa Rica
- Coordinates: 8.675°N 83.705°W
- Area: 3.20 square kilometres (1.24 sq mi)
- Established: 17 April 1997
- Governing body: National System of Conservation Areas (SINAC)

Punta Río Claro Mixed Wildlife Refuge (Spanish: Refugio de Vida Silvestre Mixto Punta Río Claro), is a protected area in Costa Rica, managed under the Osa Conservation Area, it was created in 1997 by decree 25937-MINAE.
