= Osa Conservation Area =

Conservation area in Costa Rica

- Área de Conservación Osa
- Location of the area, labeled ACOSA in the southeast of the country.
- Location: Puntarenas Province, Costa Rica
- Coordinates: 8.5°N 83.5°W
- Governing body: National System of Conservation Areas (SINAC)
- Website: Osa Conservation Area

Osa Conservation Area is an administrative area which is managed by SINAC for the purposes of conservation in Costa Rica, on the southern Pacific coast region. It contains two National Parks, and numerous Wildlife refuges and other types of nature reserve.

== Protected areas ==
- Ballena Marine National Park
- Caño Island Biological Reserve
- Carate Mixed Wildlife Refuge
- Corcovado National Park
- Golfito Mixed Wildlife Refuge
- Golfo Dulce Forest Reserve
- Osa Mixed Wildlife Refuge
- Pejeperro Wildlife Refuge
- Piedras Blancas National Park
- Preciosa-Platanares Mixed Wildlife Refuge
- Punta Río Claro Mixed Wildlife Refuge
- Quillotro Mixed Wildlife Refuge
- Rancho La Merced Mixed Wildlife Refuge
- Térraba-Sierpe Wetland
