= Quillotro Mixed Wildlife Refuge =

Protected area in Costa Rica

- Refugio de Vida Silvestre Mixto Quillotro
- Location within Costa Rica
- Location: Costa Rica
- Coordinates: 8.643°N 83.718°W
- Area: 0.67 square kilometres (0.26 sq mi)
- Established: 15 June 1999
- Governing body: National System of Conservation Areas (SINAC)

Quillotro Mixed Wildlife Refuge (Spanish: Refugio de Vida Silvestre Mixto Quillotro), is a protected area in Costa Rica, managed under the Osa Conservation Area, it was created in 1999 by decree 27923-MINAE.
