= Osa Mixed Wildlife Refuge =

Protected area in Costa Rica

- Refugio de Vida Silvestre Mixto Osa
- Location within Costa Rica
- Location: Costa Rica
- Coordinates: 8.422°N 83.335°W
- Area: 17.59 square kilometres (6.79 sq mi)
- Established: 15 June 1999
- Governing body: National System of Conservation Areas (SINAC)

Osa Mixed Wildlife Refuge (Spanish: Refugio de Vida Silvestre Mixto Osa), is a protected area in Costa Rica, managed under the Osa Conservation Area, it was created in 1999 by decree 27922-MINAE.
