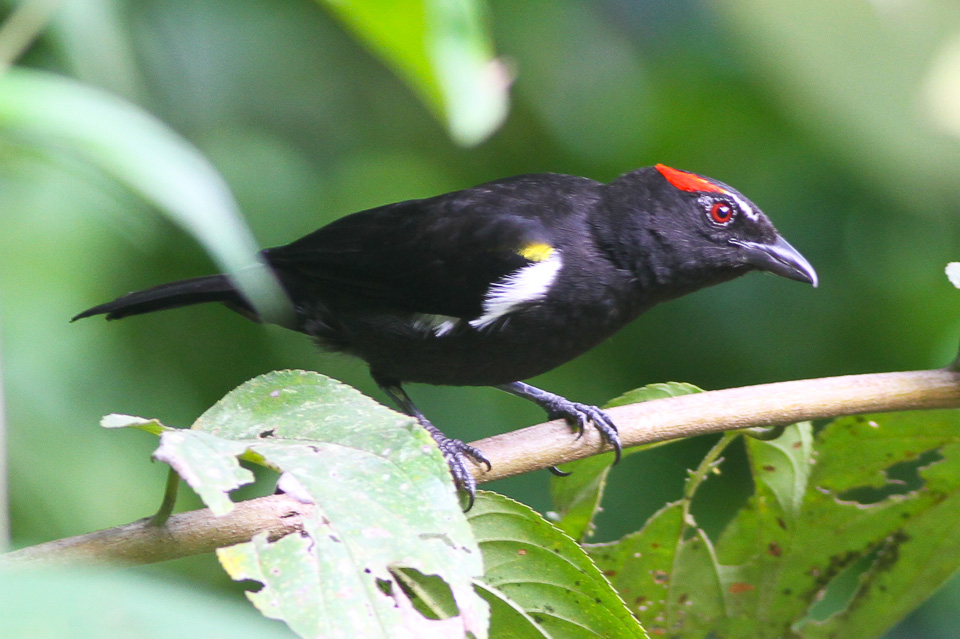

Conservation status
- Least Concern (IUCN 3.1)

Scientific classification
- Kingdom: Animalia
- Phylum: Chordata
- Class: Aves
- Order: Passeriformes
- Family: Thraupidae
- Genus: Heterospingus
- Species: H. xanthopygius

Binomial name
- Heterospingus xanthopygius (Sclater, PL, 1855)

= Scarlet-browed tanager =

Species of bird

The scarlet-browed tanager (Heterospingus xanthopygius) is a species of bird in the family Thraupidae, the tanagers and allies. It is found in Colombia, Ecuador, and Panama.

== Taxonomy and systematics ==
The scarlet-browed tanager was formally described in 1855 with the binomial Tachyphonus xanthopygius. It now shares the genus Heterospingus with the sulphur-rumped tanager (H. rubrifrons). Some twentieth century authors treated them as conspecific but they are significantly different in morphology and genetics. They form a superspecies.

The scarlet-browed tanager has two subspecies, the nominate H. x. xanthopygius (Sclater, PL, 1855) and H. x. berliozi (Wetmore, 1966).

== Description ==
The scarlet-browed tanager is about 17 cm (6.7 in) long; two males weighed 38 and 39.5 g (1.3 and 1.4 oz). It is a large tanager with a heavy bill that has a slight hook at the tip. The species is sexually dimorphic. Adult males of the nominate subspecies are mostly sooty black. They have a supercilium that begins thinly with white and broadens to scarlet; the scarlet forms a tuft behind the eye. They have a bright yellow rump, bright yellow lesser upperwing coverts that are usually hidden, a slate-gray vent, white underwing coverts, and a long white pectoral tuft. Adult females have a dark leaden gray crown, nape, and back, a bright yellow rump, and dark gray uppertail coverts. Their wings have hidden yellow lesser coverts, dark gray median and greater coverts, and blackish flight feathers. Their tail is blackish. Their throat and underparts are a slightly paler gray than their upperparts with a white pectoral tuft and a yellowish tinge on the undertail coverts. Males of subspecies H. x. berliozi are mostly slaty rather than sooty black. Females are darker than the nominate with a smaller pectoral tuft. Both sexes of both subspecies have a dark red iris, a blackish bill, and dark gray legs and feet. Juveniles resemble adult females.

== Distribution and habitat ==
The nominate subspecies of the scarlet-browed tanager is the more northerly of the two. It is found from eastern Panama's eastern Darién Province into Colombia at the northern ends of the Western and Central Andes and in the valley of the Magdalena River south in Antioquia Department. Subspecies H. x. berliozi is found along the Pacific slope from northern Chocó Department in northwestern Colombia south into northwestern Ecuador to extreme northern Guayas Province.

The scarlet-browed tanager inhabits the canopy and edges of humid to wet primary and secondary forest in the lowlands and foothills. In elevation it reaches to about 900 m (3,000 ft) in Panama, 1,200 m (3,900 ft) in Colombia, and 800 m (2,600 ft) in Ecuador.

== Behavior ==
=== Movement ===
The scarlet-browed tanager is a year-round resident.

=== Feeding ===
The scarlet-browed tanager feeds on plant material and arthropods; it has been seen eating Cecropia catkins and Miconia berries. It typically forages from the forest's mid-level to its canopy. It usually is in pairs and less often singly or in small groups. It regularly joins mixed-species feeding flocks. It feeds on plant material while perched and on arthropods by gleaning while perched, with a short sally to foliage, and with a flutter-flight.

=== Breeding ===
The scarlet-browed tanager's breeding season has not been defined but appears to include December to May in Colombia. Nothing else is known about the species' breeding biology.

=== Vocalization ===
The scarlet-browed tanager's song is "a squeaky, twittering and somewhat rhythmic cheero-bitty cheero-bitty cherro-pit-sup" that has several variations. Its calls include "a loud, forceful chip, nasal in quality [and] thin high tseet notes.

== Status ==
The IUCN has assessed the scarlet-browed tanager as being of Least Concern. It has a large range; its estimated population of at least 50,000 mature individuals is believed to be decreasing. No immediate threats have been identified. It is considered fairly common and occurs in several protected areas; there is much intact habitat outside the protected areas.
