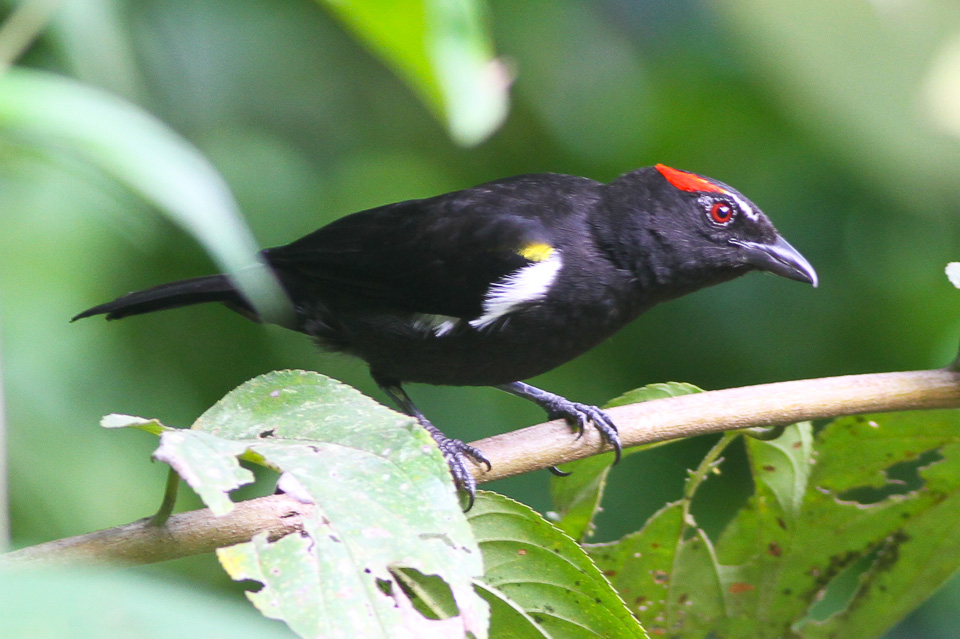
- Scarlet-browed tanager (Heterospingus xanthopygius)

Scientific classification
- Kingdom: Animalia
- Phylum: Chordata
- Class: Aves
- Order: Passeriformes
- Family: Thraupidae
- Genus: Heterospingus; Ridgway, 1898

Type species
- Tachyphonus rubrifrons Lawrence, 1865

Species
- Heterospingus rubrifrons Heterospingus xanthopygius

= Heterospingus =

Genus of birds

Heterospingus is a small genus of medium-sized birds in the tanager family Thraupidae that are found in the forests of Central and South America.

== Taxonomy and species list ==
The genus Heterospingus was introduced in 1898 by the American ornithologist Robert Ridgway with the sulphur-rumped tanager as the type species. The name combines the Ancient Greek heteros meaning "different" with spingos meaning "finch".

The genus contains the following two species:

Image	Scientific name	Common name	Distribution
	Heterospingus rubrifrons	Sulphur-rumped tanager	Costa Rica and Panama.
	Heterospingus xanthopygius	Scarlet-browed tanager	Panama, Colombia and Ecuador
