= Preciosa-Platanares Mixed Wildlife Refuge =

Protected area in Costa Rica

- Refugio de Vida Silvestre Mixto Preciosa-Platanares
- Location within Costa Rica
- Location: Costa Rica
- Coordinates: 8.525°N 83.291°W
- Area: 2.58 square kilometres (1.00 sq mi)
- Established: 20 April 1998
- Governing body: National System of Conservation Areas (SINAC)

Preciosa-Platanares Mixed Wildlife Refuge (Spanish: Refugio de Vida Silvestre Mixto Preciosa-Platanares), is a protected area in Costa Rica, managed under the Osa Conservation Area, it was created in 1998 by decree 26825-MINAE.
