= Panamanian dry forests =

Ecoregion in Panama

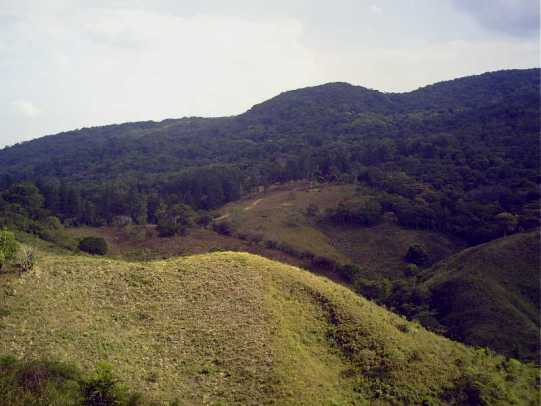
- Las Minas District, Panama

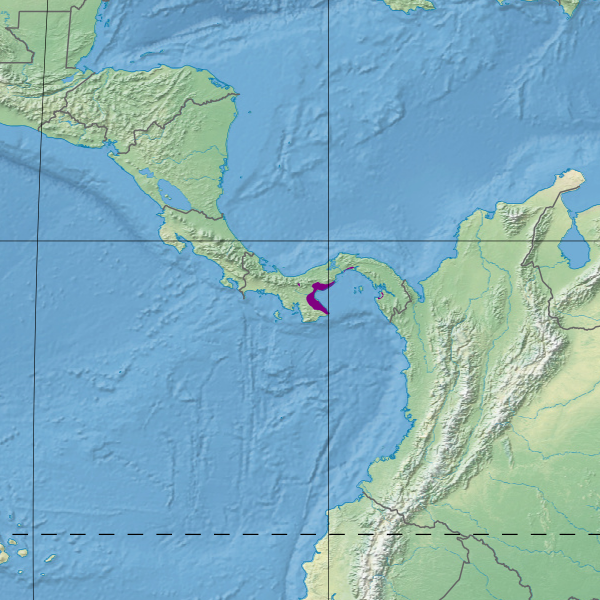
- Ecoregion territory (in purple)

Ecology
- Realm: Neotropic
- Biome: Tropical and subtropical dry broadleaf forests
- Borders: Gulf of Panama mangroves; Isthmian–Atlantic moist forests; Isthmian–Pacific moist forests

Geography
- Area: 5,120 km^{2} (1,980 sq mi)
- Country: Panama
- Coordinates: 8.059°N 80.591°W

The Panamanian dry forests ecoregion (WWF ID: NT0224) covers low-lying dry forests around the coast of the Gulf of Panama on the Pacific Ocean side of Panama. It is one of the most heavily degraded ecoregions in Central America, having been heavily converted to agriculture. However, it is also important for its high biodiversity, high rates of endemic species, and its importance as a biological corridor between the moist forests inland and the mangroves on the coast.

== Location and description ==
The Gulf of Panama has minor gulfs around its rim. The largest sector of this ecoregion is around the Gulf of Parita on the west. There are smaller sectors in the north on Panama Bay (around Panama City), and the Bay of San Miguel on the east. Most of the region is lowlands, with an average elevation of 80 metres (260 ft). The western sector is surrounded on the interior side by the Isthmian–Pacific moist forests ecoregion, the eastern sectors by the Isthmian–Atlantic moist forests ecoregion. There is a thin strip of mangroves on the coast side of portions of the ecoregion.

== Climate ==
The climate of the ecoregino is Tropical savanna climate - dry winter (Köppen climate classification (Aw)). This climate is characterized by relatively even temperatures throughout the year, and a pronounced dry season. The driest month has less than 60 mm of precipitation, and is drier than the average month. Because the ecoregion is in the rain shadow of the central mountains, precipitation is lower than in the surrounding moist forests, averaging 1,500 mm/year.

== Flora and fauna ==
Very little forest remains. Over 70% of the ecoregion has been converted to agriculture. 15% is open forest, and 5% is broadleaf evergreen closed forest. A little over 1% of the territory is herbaceous wetland, but grades into mangroves where salt-water influences dominate 1-3 km from the shore. Species diversity is high due to the variety of ecozones meeting in close proximity. 518 species are vertebrate are known in the ecoregion.

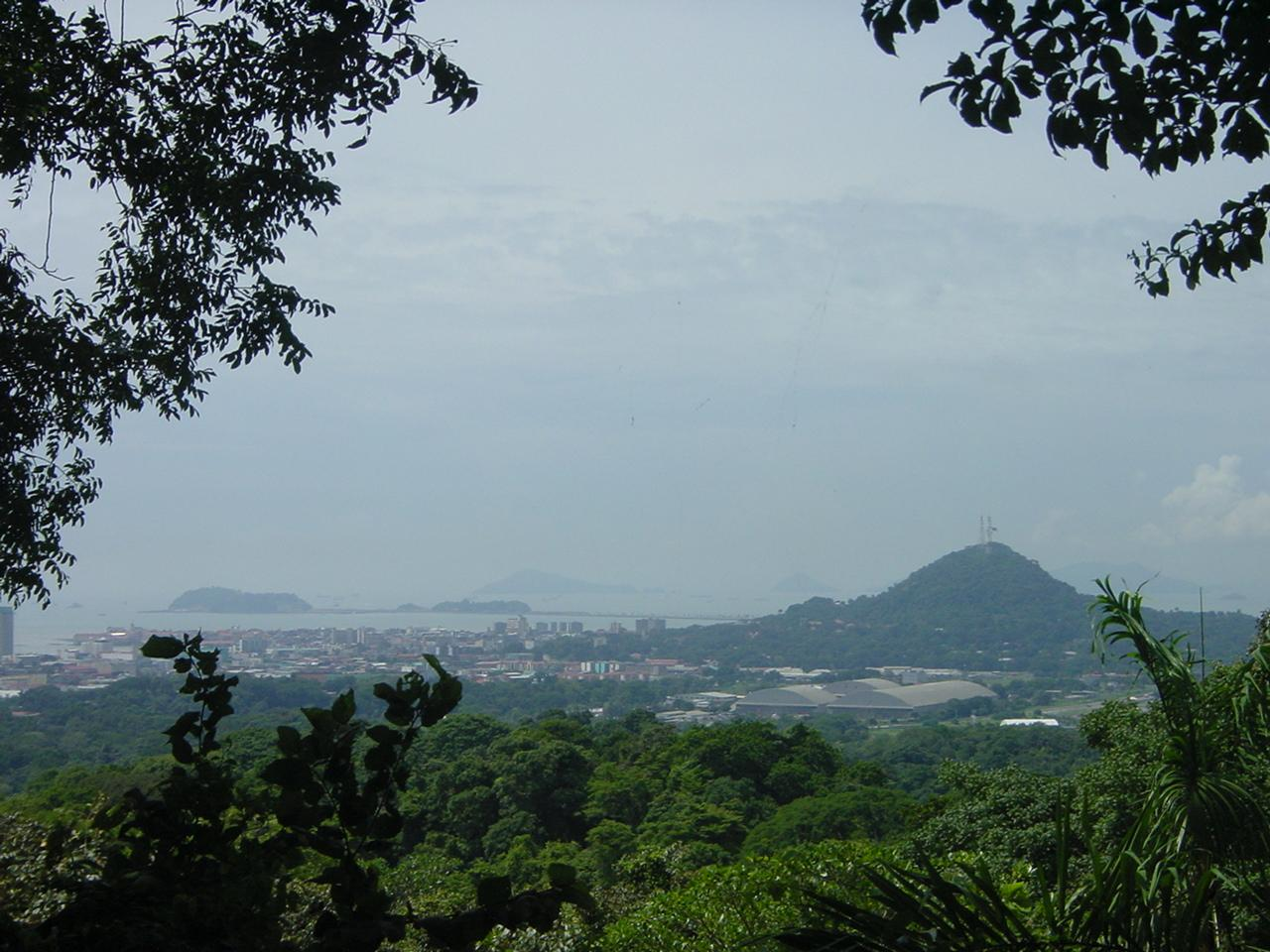
Metropolitan Natural Park, near Panama City)

== Protected areas ==
Less than 2% of the ecoregion is officially protected. These protected areas include:

- Sarigua National Park
- Metropolitan Natural Park
