= Térraba-Sierpe Wetland =

Protected area in Costa Rica

- Humedal Térraba-Sierpe
- Location within Costa Rica
- Location: Costa Rica
- Coordinates: 8.909°N 83.481°W
- Area: 267.79 square kilometres (103.39 sq mi)
- Established: 17 March 1994
- Governing body: National System of Conservation Areas (SINAC)

Ramsar Wetland
- Official name: Térraba–Sierpe
- Designated: 11 December 1995
- Reference no.: 782

Térraba-Sierpe Wetland (Spanish: Humedal Térraba-Sierpe), is a protected area in Costa Rica, managed under the Osa Conservation Area, it was created in 1994 by decree 22993-MIRENEM. It has been designated as a protected Ramsar site since 1995.

== Flora and fauna ==
The wetland has been documented as home to around 200 species of fish, 60 species of crustaceans, 46 species of molluscs, 9 species of amphibians, 27 species of reptiles and 148 species of birds.
