= Southern Dry Pacific Coast mangroves =

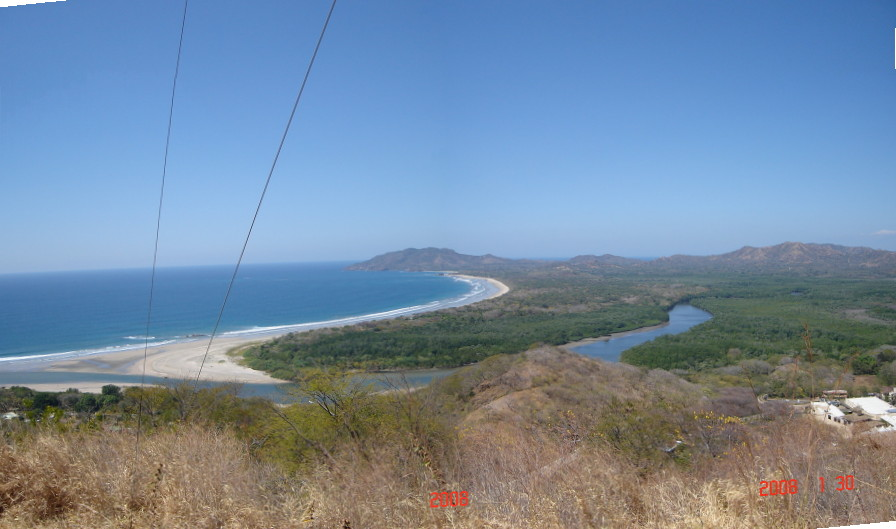
- Las Baulas Marine National Park

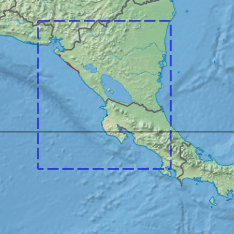
- Ecoregion territory (in red)

Ecology
- Realm: Neotropic
- Biome: Mangroves

Geography
- Area: 777 km^{2} (300 sq mi)
- Country: Nicaragua, Costa Rica
- Coordinates: 12.32°N 86.92°W

The Southern Dry Pacific Coast mangroves ecoregion (WWF ID: NT1434) covers a series of mangrove forests along the Pacific Ocean coast of Nicaragua and Costa Rica, from the southern margin of the Gulf of Fonseca to the Gulf of Nicoya near the border with Panama. Because the area is drier than the mangroves further south, evapotranspiration leaves some areas with higher salinity and even salt pans in the internal areas.

== Location and description ==
At the northwestern endo of the Nicaragua coastline is an estuary around the village of Padre Ramos, just outside the Gulf of Fonseca. This site is one of two nesting areas in the eastern Pacific for the hawksbill sea turtle (Eretmochelys imbricata). 92 km2 of the area is now in a protected in the Estero Padre Ramos Natural Reserve. The next mangrove area to the east begins at the Aserradores Estuary and extends through the bay at Corinto, then through Las Peñitas for a total of over 60 km of coastline. Immediately to the east is the estuary at Puerto Sandino, with some smaller river estuaries further towards the Costa Rica border. The ecoregion inland from all of these mangrove forests is the Central American dry forests ecoregion.

== Climate ==
The climate of the ecoregion is Tropical savanna climate - dry winter (Köppen climate classification (Aw)). This climate is characterized by relatively even temperatures throughout the year, and a pronounced dry season. The driest month has less than 60 mm of precipitation, and is drier than the average month. Precipitation ranges from 1,300 mm/year in Nicaragua in Costa Rica. There is a relatively dry season from December to April.

== Flora and fauna ==
Characteristic tree species of the area are typical of mangroves: red mangrove (Rhizophora mangle), Rhizophora harrisonii, Rhizophora racemosa, black mangrove (Avicennia germinans), Avicennia bicolor, white mangrove (Laguncularia racemosa), tea mangrove (Pelliciera rhizophorae) and, in drier areas, button mangrove (Conocarpus erectus). The Rhizopora species tend to occur near the sea, and the Avicennia species along the inland margin.

The area is an important for wintering and nesting birds. Mangrove-associated bird species include the Panama flycatcher (Myiarchus panamensis), the Eurasian whimbrel (Numenius phaeopus), the yellow-crowned night heron (Nyctanassa violacea), the black-crowned night heron (Nycticorax nycticorax), the scaly-breasted hummingbird (Phaeochroa cuvierii), the grey plover (Pluvialis squatarola), the prothonotary warbler (Protonotaria citrea), the northern waterthrush (Seiurus noveboracensis), the northern scrub-flycatcher (Sublegatus arenarum), the mangrove swallow (Tachycineta albilinea), and the greater yellowlegs (Tringa melanoleuca). Mammals of conservation interest include: vulnerable mantled howler monkey (Alouatta palliata), spectacled caiman (Caiman crocodilus), and the spectral bat (Vampyrum spectrum).

== Protected areas ==
Officially protected areas in the ecoregion include:

- Estero Padre Ramos Natural Reserve
- Juan Venado Island Natural Reserve
- Las Baulas Marine National Park
