= Las Peñitas, Nicaragua =

Las Peñitas
- Location within Nicaragua
- Coordinates: 12°21′41″N 87°01′17″W
- country: Nicaragua
- Department: León

Population (2018)
  - Total: 1,050

Las Peñitas is a fishing village and tourist beach community on the North Western coast of Nicaragua. It lies within the León, Nicaragua municipality and the department of León and is next to Poneloya, Nicaragua. It is becoming a more and more popular tourist destination and has recently (2009) received a new road courtesy of the Millennium Challenge Corporation, a U.S. foreign aid agency created by the U.S. Congress in 2004 to disburse the war reparation settlement won by Nicaragua at the World Court in the Hague. There are many hotel beach bars catering to backpackers, surfers, foreign aid project workers, religious groups, and expats. Next to Las Peñitas is the Juan Venado Island Natural Reserve, popular with visitors for the wildlife and turtle migrations.

Some tourist attractions of the area include volcano boarding at nearby Cerro Negro volcano, boat trips into the nature reserve, and surf lessons. During certain times of the year, visitors can also visit the turtle hatchery on Isla Juan Venado to witness live sea turtle hatching.

== See also ==
- Poneloya, Nicaragua
- León (department)
- Nicaragua
