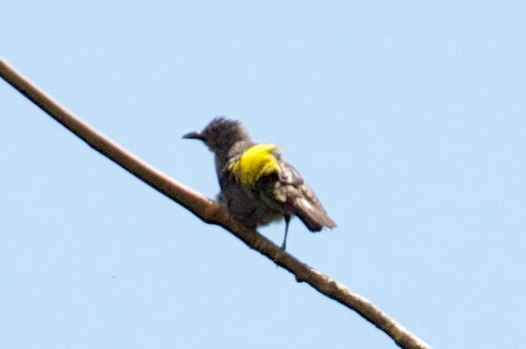

Conservation status
- Least Concern (IUCN 3.1)

Scientific classification
- Kingdom: Animalia
- Phylum: Chordata
- Class: Aves
- Order: Passeriformes
- Family: Thraupidae
- Genus: Heterospingus
- Species: H. rubrifrons

Binomial name
- Heterospingus rubrifrons (Lawrence, 1865)

= Sulphur-rumped tanager =

Species of bird

The sulphur-rumped tanager (Heterospingus rubrifrons) is a species of bird in the family Thraupidae, the tanagers and allies. It is found in Costa Rica and Panama.

== Taxonomy and systematics ==
The sulphur-rumped tanager was formally described in 1865 with the binomial Tachyphonus rubrifrons. In 1898 Robert Ridgway erected genus Heterospingus with the sulphur-rumped tanager as the type species. The sulphur-rumped tanager shares the genus with the scarlet-browed tanager (H. xanthopygius). Some twentieth century authors treated them as conspecific but they are significantly different in morphology and genetics. They form a superspecies.

The sulphur-rumped tanager is monotypic.

== Description ==
The sulphur-rumped tanager is 15 cm (5.9 in) long and weighs 36 to 40 g (1.3 to 1.4 oz). It is a large tanager with a heavy bill that has a slight hook at the tip. The species is slightly sexually dimorphic. Adult males have a dark leaden gray head, neck, and back, a yellow rump, and olive-green uppertail coverts. Their wings and tail are dusky. Their throat and underparts are mostly a paler gray than the upperparts with white pectoral tufts and olive-green undertail coverts. Adult females are similar to males but sometimes have no olive on their uppertail coverts and their belly often has a brownish tinge. Both sexes have a dark red to reddish brown iris, a blackish bill, and blue-gray legs and feet. Immatures are similar to adults though with sootier upperparts, a smaller yellow rump patch, and an olive tinge on the underparts.

== Distribution and habitat ==
The sulphur-rumped tanager is found intermittently on the Caribbean slope from eastern Costa Rica's Limón Province to Guna Yala (San Blas Province) in eastern Panama. It is also found locally on Panama's Pacific slope in Veraguas, Panamá, and far western Darién provinces. It inhabits the interior and edges of humid tropical evergreen forest in the lowlands and foothills. Sources differ on its elevational range. One says its upper limit is 1,000 m (3,300 ft) and two say it is 900 m (3,000 ft). Sources agree that it reaches only about 700 m (2,300 ft) in Costa Rica.

== Behavior ==
=== Movement ===
The sulphur-rumped tanager is a year-round resident.

=== Feeding ===
The sulphur-rumped tanager feeds on fruit and arthropods. It typically forages from the forest's mid-level to its canopy. It usually is in pairs or family groups and often joins mixed-species feeding flocks.

=== Breeding ===
A pair of sulphur-rumped tanagers were observed carrying nesting material in November. Nothing else is known about the species' breeding biology.

=== Vocalization ===
The sulphur-rumped tanager's song has seldom been recorded. Its flight call "repeats a thin seet or silt". Other calls include "a thin tsip or tseet, singly or sometimes in rapid, squeaky or twittery series".

== Status ==
The IUCN has assessed the sulphur-rumped tanager as being of Least Concern. Its estimated population of at least 20,000 mature individuals is believed to be decreasing. No immediate threats have been identified. It is considered very rare in Costa Rica and uncommon in Panama. It occurs in several protected areas, and "so long as current protected areas are maintained the species’ near-term future should be secure".
