= Golfo Dulce Forest Reserve =

Protected area in Costa Rica

- Reserva Forestal Golfo Dulce
- IUCN category VI (protected area with sustainable use of natural resources)
- Golfo Dulce Forest Reserve area
- Location: Costa Rica
- Coordinates: 8.611°N 83.497°W
- Area: 619.59 square kilometres (239.23 sq mi)
- Established: 28 April 1975
- Governing body: National System of Conservation Areas (SINAC)
- Location in Costa Rica

Golfo Dulce Forest Reserve (Spanish: Reserva Forestal Golfo Dulce), is a protected area in Costa Rica, managed under the Osa Conservation Area. It was created in 1975 by decree 8494-A.
