= Costa Rican seasonal moist forests =

Ecoregion in Costa Rica and Nicaragua

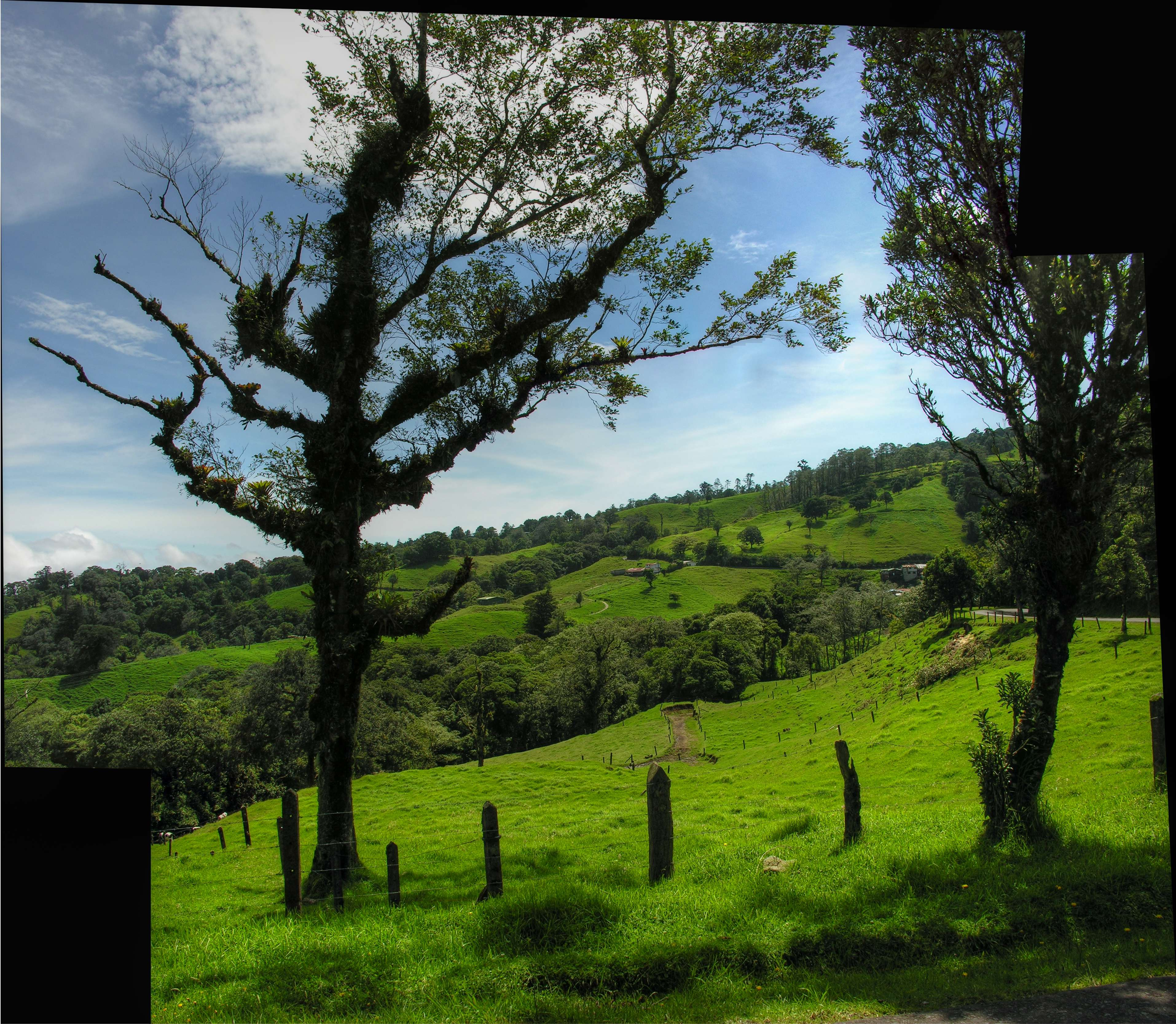
- Poas Volcano area, Costa Rica

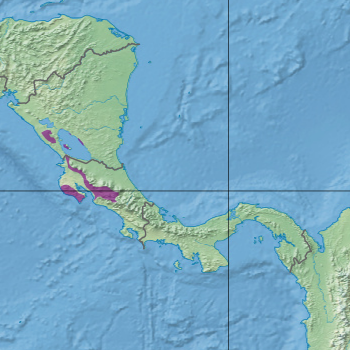
- Ecoregion territory (in purple)

Ecology
- Realm: Neotropic
- Biome: Tropical and subtropical moist broadleaf forests
- Borders: List: Central American dry forests; Isthmian–Atlantic moist forests; Isthmian–Pacific moist forests; Southern Dry Pacific Coast mangroves; Talamancan montane forests

Geography
- Area: 10,791 km^{2} (4,166 sq mi)
- Countries: Costa Rica; Nicaragua
- Coordinates: 9.75°N 84.25°W

The Costa Rican seasonal moist forests ecoregion (WWF ID: NT0119) covers the Pacific Slope of the volcanic mountain range of northwestern Costa Rica and the extreme south of Nicaragua. The area has a distinct dry season during which the characteristic deciduous trees drop their leaves. The forests themselves have been highly degraded in the past by human conversion to agriculture and settlement. The Costa Rican capital city of San Jose is in the middle of this ecoregion.

== Location and description ==
The northern mountain range in Costa Rica, the Cordillera de Guanacaste, stretches for 110 km from the border with Nicaragua southeast to Costa Rica's Cordillera Central (Costa Rica). As the range occurs where the Cocos Plate is subducting beneath the Caribbean Plate there are many stratovolcanoes in the Cordillera de Guancaste. The mean elevation in the ecoregion is 580 metres (1,900 ft); the highest point is 580 metres (1,900 ft). The ecoregion to the east at higher elevations is the Talamancan montane forests ecoregion. At lower elevations to the west the bordering ecoregion is the Central American dry forests region.

== Climate ==
The climate of the ecoregion is Tropical monsoon climate (Köppen climate classification (Am)). This climate is characterized by relatively even temperatures throughout the year (all months being greater than 18 °C (64 °F) average temperature), and a pronounced dry season. The driest month has less than 60 mm of precipitation, but more than (100-(average/25) mm. This climate is mid-way between a tropical rainforest and a tropical savannah. Precipitation averages 1,500 mm/year, falling mostly in the 'wet season' of April to October.

== Flora and fauna ==
About one-third of the ecoregion is closed broadleaf evergreen forest, one third is open forest of various types, and one-third of the territory has been converted to agriculture. Because the ecoregion is in the rain shadow of the mountains, there is a distinct dry season (December through March). The plants of the region have accordingly developed adaptations for coping with the dry season, such the deciduous trees dropping their leaves in winter.

Animal life in the ecoregion is linked to the wetter regions to the east and higher elevations. Taking advantage of the seasonal dryness, many invertebrates and birds migrate into the drier forests for breeding and for taking advantage of the differing food availability cycle.

IN the past 100 years, humans have cleared most of the area for agriculture, only perhaps 10% of the forest remains in its original state. Lower elevations have been cleared for cattle raising, higher elevations for coffee, corn, beans, and dairy cattle.

== Protected areas ==
11% of the ecoregion is officially protected. These protected areas include:

- Carara National Park
- Rincón de la Vieja National Park
- Poás Volcano National Park
- Volcán Irazú
- Masaya Volcano
- Los Santos Forest Reserve
- Central Volcanic Mountain Range Forest Reserve
- Guanacaste National Park (Costa Rica)
