= Juan Venado Island Natural Reserve =

Nature reserve in Nicaragua

Coordinates: 12.331839°N 86.979103°W

Juan Venado Island Natural Reserve is a nature reserve in Nicaragua. It is one of the 78 reserves that are under official protection in the country. The reserve is home to a wide variety of different species including sea turtles, crocodiles and caimans.
