= Golfito Mixed Wildlife Refuge =

Protected area in Costa Rica

- Refugio de Vida Silvestre Mixto Golfito
- IUCN category IV (habitat/species management area)
- Location within Costa Rica
- Location: Costa Rica
- Coordinates: 8.650°N 83.183°W
- Area: 28.77 square kilometres (11.11 sq mi)
- Established: 22 April 1986
- Governing body: National System of Conservation Areas (SINAC)

Golfito Mixed Wildlife Refuge (Spanish: Refugio de Vida Silvestre Mixto Golfito), is a protected area in Costa Rica, managed under the Osa Conservation Area, it was created in 1986 by decree 16912-MAG.
