= Bocas del Toro–San Bastimentos Island–San Blas mangroves =

Ecoregion in Costa Rica and Panama

Bocas del Toro-San Bastimentos Island-San Blas mangroves
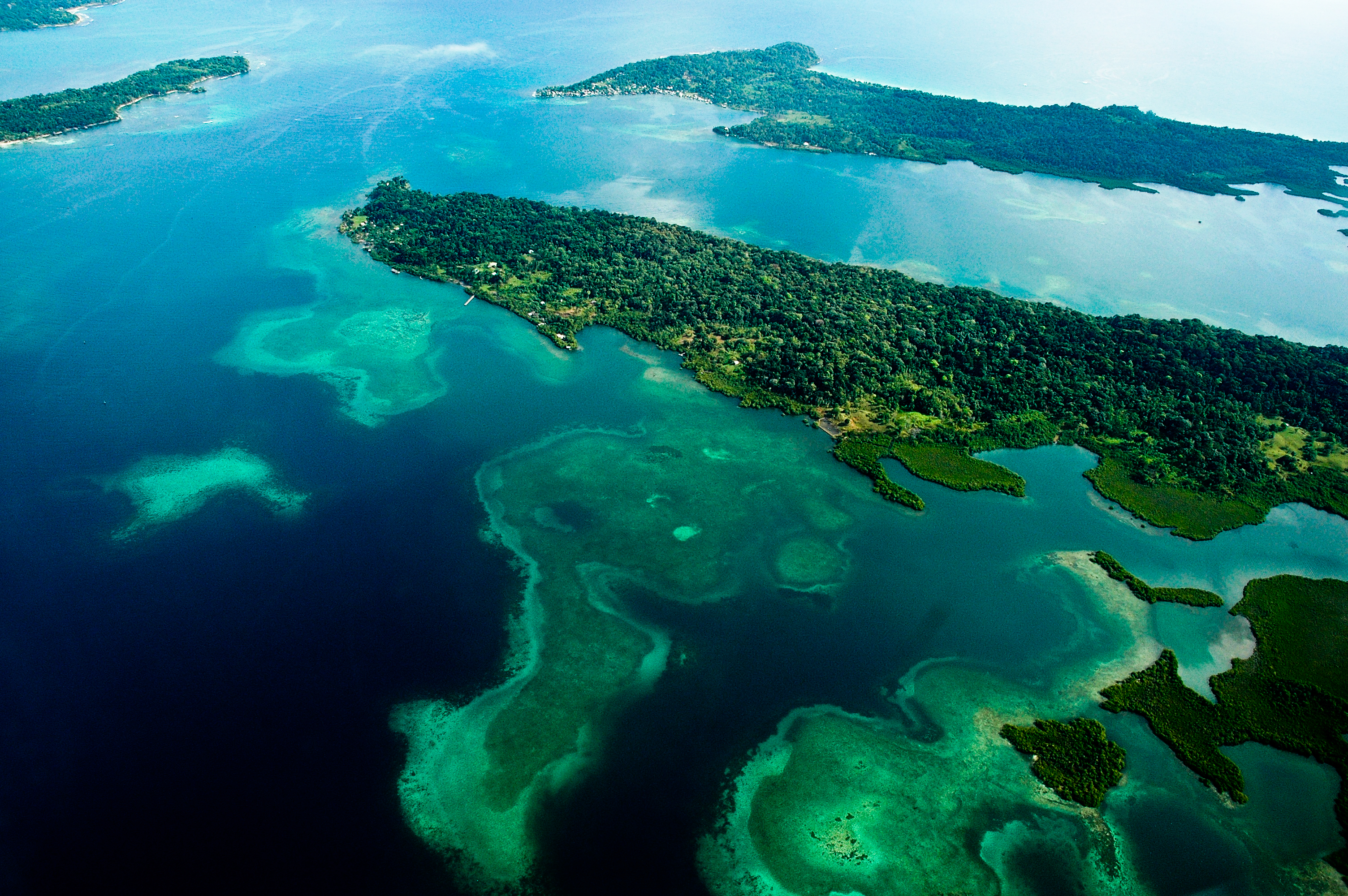
- Bastimentos Island, Panama

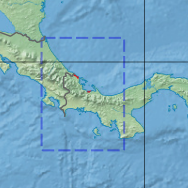
- Ecoregion territory (in red)

Ecology
- Realm: Neotropic
- Biome: Mangroves

Geography
- Area: 518 km^{2} (200 sq mi)
- Country: Panama, Costa Rica
- Coordinates: 9.4°N 82.5°W

The Bocas del Toro-San Bastimentos Island-San Blas mangroves ecoregion (WWF ID:NT1407) covers the mangrove (brackish and saltwater) habitats along the Caribbean Sea coast of Costa Rica and across the northern coast of Panama. An offshore reef and barrier islands of the region help protect the mangroves from destructive waves. The ecoregion has a high number of endangered and threatened species, including the loggerhead sea turtle, green sea turtle, and hawk's bill sea turtle.

== Location and description ==
The ecoregion has two small sites in Costa Rica, one around the bay north of Limón, and another on the Panamanian border in the Jairo Mora Sandoval Gandoca-Manzanillo Mixed Wildlife Refuge. In Panama, the sites are grouped around the outlet of the Changuinola River, and the coast and islands of Bocas del Toro Province. The archipelago around Bastimentos Island guards the entrance to Chiriquí Lagoon, which is mostly surrounded by mangrove swamps. Farther east there are smaller mangrove sites at Colón, Panama, Isla Grande (Bastimentos, Portobelo), and the western side of the Gulf of Guna Yala.

Immediately inland of the ecoregion mangroves at the forests of the Isthmian–Atlantic moist forests ecoregion.

== Climate ==
The climate of the ecoregion is Tropical savanna climate - dry winter (Köppen climate classification (Aw)). This climate is characterized by relatively even temperatures throughout the year, and a pronounced dry season. The driest month has less than 60 mm of precipitation, and is drier than the average month. Precipitation averages 2,000 mm/year to 4,000 mm/year. The rainy season is May to December.

== Flora and fauna ==
The characteristic mangrove trees of this ecoregion are red mangrove (Rhizophora mangle, Rhizophora harrisonii, white mangrove (Laguncularia racemosa, Conocarpus erectus) and black mangrove (Avicennia germinans).

The ecoregion supports 24 endangered or threatened mammals, including the vulnerable (Trichechus manatus, and the Red brocket (Mazama americana). Endangered reptiles include the vulnerable loggerhead sea turtle (Caretta caretta), the endangered green sea turtle (Chelonia mydas), the vulnerable leatherback sea turtle (Dermochelys coriacea), and the critically endangered hawksbill sea turtle (Eretmochelys imbricata).

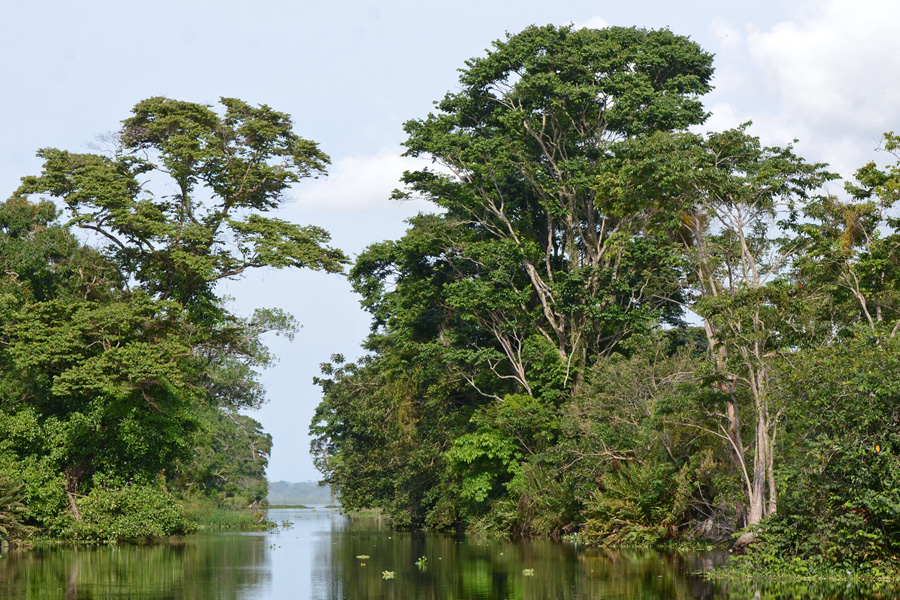
East of Changuinola, Bocas del Toro, Panama

== Protected areas ==
Protected areas in the ecoregion include:

- Tortuguero National Park, in the Limón Province of Costa Rica
- Jairo Mora Sandoval Gandoca-Manzanillo Mixed Wildlife Refuge, in the Limón Province of Costa Rica
- Isla Bastimentos National Marine Park, in Panama
- San San-Pond Sak, a privately administered area in Panama
