= Isthmian–Pacific moist forests =

Ecoregion of southern Costa Rica and western Panama

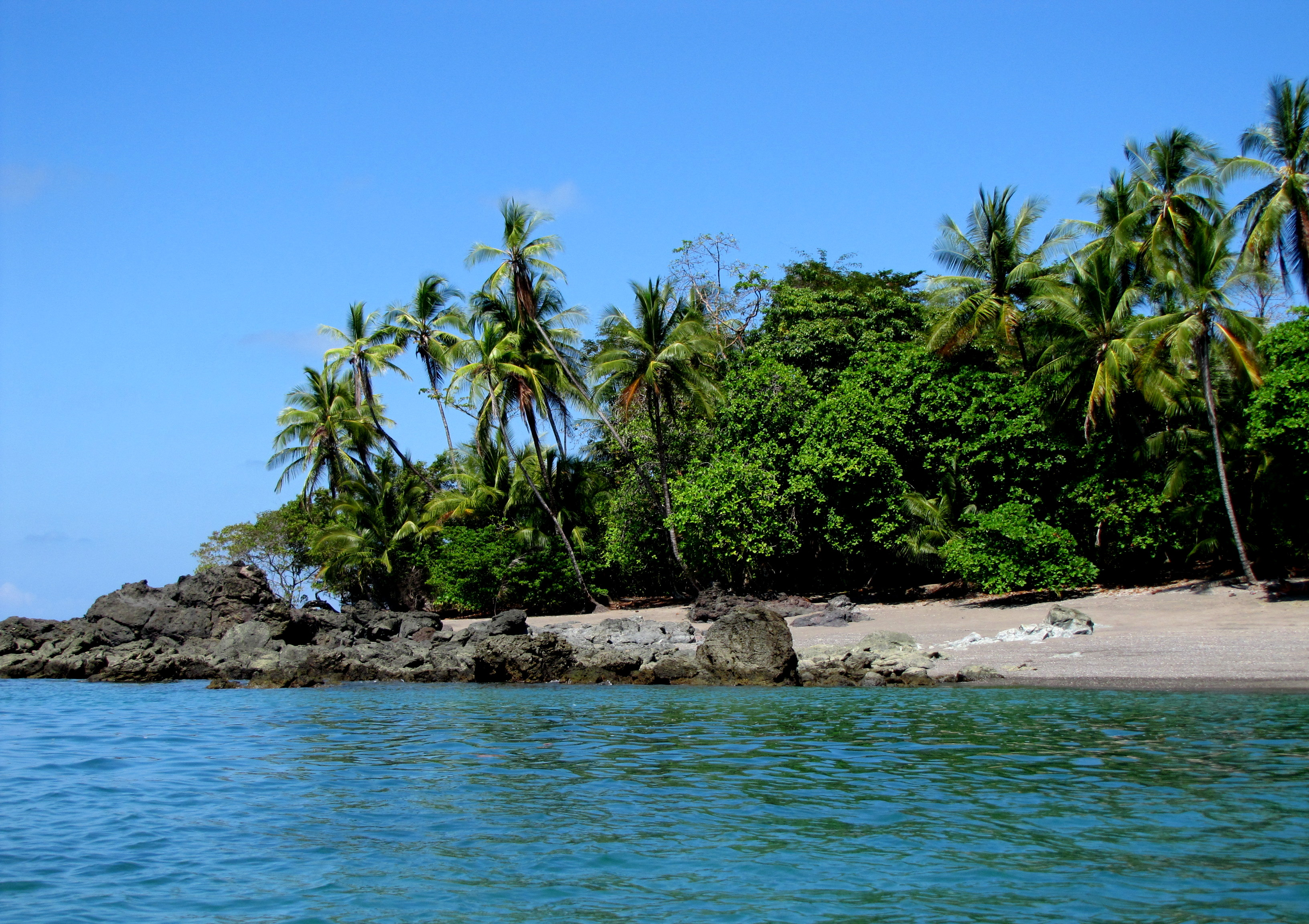
- Beach in Corcovado National Park, Costa Rica

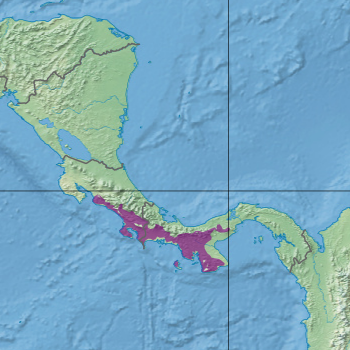
- Ecoregion territory (in purple)

Ecology
- Realm: Neotropic
- Biome: Tropical and subtropical moist broadleaf forests
- Borders: Costa Rican seasonal moist forests; Isthmian–Atlantic moist forests; Panamanian dry forests; Talamancan montane forests

Geography
- Area: 29,364 km^{2} (11,338 sq mi)
- Coordinates: 8.25°N 81.25°W

The Isthmian–Pacific moist forests ecoregion (WWF ID: NT0130) covers the lowland tropical evergreen forests on the Pacific side of the central mountains of southern Costa Rica and western Panama. As the meeting zone between North and South American floral communities, the area is one of very high biodiversity. Much of the rainforest has, however, been cleared for subsistence agriculture and cattle grazing.

== Location and description ==
The ecoregion is bounded on the west by the Pacific Ocean and on the east by the central mountains of Costa Rica and Panama: the Cordillera Central in Costa Rica at the northern end, extending into Panama as the Cordillera de Talamanca. The mean elevation in the ecoregion is 319 metres (1,047 ft), reaching from sea level to heights of 2,282 metres (7,487 ft). The strip of lowlands runs for 500 km west to east, and typically only 50 km wide. The higher elevations in the mountains to the east are in the Talamancan montane forests ecoregion. The mountains are an active volcanic zone, and most of the soils are derived from the parent basalt bedrock.

== Climate ==
The climate of the ecoregion is Tropical monsoon climate (Köppen climate classification (Am)). This climate is characterized by relatively even temperatures throughout the year (all months being greater than 18 °C (64 °F) average temperature), and a pronounced dry season. The driest month has less than 60 mm of precipitation, but more than (100-(average/25) mm. This climate is mid-way between a tropical rainforest and a tropical savanna. Rainfall averages 2,500 mm/year in Panama, higher in Costa Rica.

== Flora and fauna ==
The region is one of high biodiversity, as the area is the meeting zone where North and South American floral and fauna communities mixed when the continents were connected three million years ago. The ecoregion's cover is about one-third closed broadleaf evergreen forest, one-third open forests of various types, and one-third converted to agriculture. Much of the original forest has been disturbed by human activities in the past 100 years, particularly fragmentation of habitat. The region is warmer than most forests to the north, and there are seasonal swamp forests in the lower elevations, grading into mangroves nearest the coast.

Biodiversity of fauna in the ecoregion is high, with 811 vertebrate taxa recorded.

Native mammals include the white-lipped peccary (Tayassu pecari), jaguar (Panthera onca), margay (Leopardus wiedii), Central American spider monkey (Ateles geoffroyi), Central American squirrel monkey (Saimiri oerstedii), Panamanian night monkey, (Aotus zonalis), giant anteater (Myrmecophega tridactyla), Handley's tailless bat (Anoura cultrata), Talamancan yellow-shouldered bat (Sturnira mordax), spectral bat (Vampyrum spectrum), and yellow isthmus rat (Isthmomis flavidus). Endemism in mammals is relatively low. Underwood's pocket gopher (Heterogeomys underwoodi) is endemic to the ecoregion.

The ecoregion overlaps the South Central American Pacific slope endemic bird area, which also covers portions of the adjacent Costa Rican seasonal moist forests ecoregion to the west and the Panamanian dry forests ecoregion to the east. Some near-endemic birds are altitudinal migrants, moving between the ecoregion and the higher-elevation Talamancan montane forests to the north. Endemic and near-endemic birds include the brown-backed dove (Leptotila battyi), Costa Rican swift (Chaetura fumosa), Veraguas mango (Anthracothorax veraguensis), white-crested coquette (Lophornis adorabilis), charming hummingbird (Polyerata decora), Baird's trogon (Trogon bairdii), fiery-billed araçari (Pteroglossus frantzii), golden-naped woodpecker (Melanerpes chrysauchen), black-hooded antshrike (Thamnophilus bridgesi), Coiba spinetail (Cranioleuca dissita), orange-collared manakin (Manacus aurantiacus), turquoise cotinga (Cotinga ridgwayi), riverside wren (Cantorchilus semibadius), spot-crowned euphonia (Euphonia imitans), black-cheeked ant tanager (Habia atrimaxillaris), and Cherrie's tanager (Ramphocelus costaricensis).

The mangrove hummingbird (Amazilia boucardi) and yellow-billed cotinga (Carpodectes antoniae) are mostly endemic to the adjacent Moist Pacific Coast mangroves, but occasionally range into coastal forests and shrublands.

Endemic amphibians include the Airstrip caecilia (Oscaecilia osae), so-called because it is only found near the La Sirena airstrip on the Osa Peninsula, the critically endangered Golfito robber frog (Eleutherodactylus taurus), and the endangered Golfodulcean poison frog (Phyllobates vittatus).

== Protected areas ==
11% of the ecoregion is officially protected. These protected areas include:

- Chirripó National Park
- Corcovado National Park
- Volcán Barú
- Manuel Antonio National Park
