= Josefina Klinger Zúñiga =

Colombian environmentalist

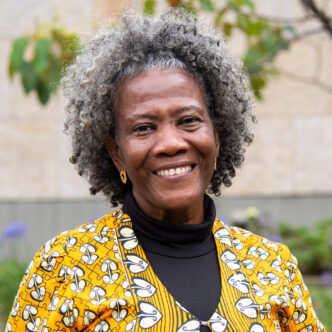
- Klinger Zúñiga in 2022
- Born: 1965 (age 60–61); Nuqui, Choco, Colombia
- Children: 3

Josefina Klinger Zúñiga (born 1965) is a Colombian environmentalist and community activist from Nuquí. She is the founder and director of the organization Mano Cambiada, which promotes sustainable tourism in the Chocó Department through a model of community self-management. Klinger Zúñiga received a Cafam Woman Award in 2015 and an International Women of Courage Award in 2022.

== Early life and family ==
Josefina Klinger Zúñiga was born in 1965 in Nuquí, Chocó, the only child of a Nuquiseño mother and a German father. She has 21 half-siblings. She left Nuquí in search of economic opportunities, but returned at the age of 25 as a single mother with two children and financial difficulties. She worked as a salesperson in a drugstore.

== Mano Cambiada ==
In 2006, Klinger Zúñiga founded the organization Mano Cambiada (Changed Hand) (Note: Mano cambiada refers to a local, moneyless ancestral practice of exchanging goods between equals.) to promote sustainable tourism and eco-tourism in Chocó through engagement with the local population. She founded the organization alongside eight other women and four men. They collaborated with external stakeholders and joined with 30 different local businesses, including restaurants, hostels, guidance centers, fishing and farmers markets to develop sustainable tourism. Mano Cambiada promotes environmental and social initiatives that emphasize cultural identities of the Afro-Colombian and indigenous communities in the cove of Utría. The organization founded an environmental and cultural school that gathers dancers, musicians and environmental clubs in the Utría National Natural Park. to help maintain the protected area through territorial management. The organization has had an impact on families and communities in Nuquí and Bahía Solano, engaging some 6,000 locals, including 2,000 who are indigenous. Due to the success of the organization, the Colombian government granted it the right to administer tourist services within the Utría National Natural Park.

Mano Cambiada has undertaken projects with Colombia's Ministry of Commerce, Industry and Tourism, the National Natural Parks System, Fondo Acción's Environment and Children's Action Fund, and Red Colombia Verde. Mano Cambiada works to revitalize the traditions of mano cambiada, bartering, and minga.

Mano Cambiada hosts an annual Migration Festival to celebrate the migratory patterns of whales, birds, and turtles that intersect with the area. The festival incorporates oral history celebrations, children's parades, theater, photography and dance.

== Awards and honors ==
Mano Cambiada was recognized by Semana magazine in 2012 as "one of the 100 social and environmental innovation ideas that are changing the world". In 2013, Klinger Zúñiga won the first place Premio Mujeres de Éxito in the social-community category.

Klinger Zúñiga received a Cafam Woman Award (Premio Cafam a la Mujer) in 2015. She was a recipient of the International Women of Courage Award in 2022.

== Personal life ==
Klinger Zúñiga lives in Nuquí and has three children. When she was 32 years old, she almost died from cerebral tuberculosis. She has previously lived in Medellín, Bogotá, Cali, Bahía Solano, Quibdó, and Panama.
