= Pacific/Chocó natural region =

Western coastal region in Colombia

Pacific/Chocó region

Ecology
- Realm: Neotropic
- Biome: Marine, Rainforest

Geography
- Country: Colombia
- Oceans or seas: Pacific Ocean
- Rivers: Atrato, San Juan, Patía
- Climate type: Tropical

Conservation
- Global 200: Chocó Biogeographic

The Pacific/Chocó region is one of the five major natural regions of Colombia. Ecologically, this region belongs entirely to the Chocó Biogeographic Region and is considered a biodiversity hotspot. It also has areas with the highest rainfall in the world, with areas near Quibdo, Chocó reaching up to 13,000 mm (510 in) annually.

== Biogeographical subregions ==
The Pacific region is bordered by the Pacific Ocean to the west and the West Andes to the east. To the north is the Darién Gap and the Serranía del Darién at the border with Panama. The area is mostly flat and covered by dense rainforest, rivers, swamps, and mangroves. The Baudó Mountains are a small, isolated range in this area along the coast. Gorgona Island is located off the southwest coast.

Politically, the region is within the following Colombian departments: Chocó, Valle del Cauca, Cauca and Nariño.

=== Rivers ===
From north to south the main rivers are the Atrato, San Juan, Calima, Dagua, Anchicayá, Sanquianga.

== Biodiversity ==
This region has the distinction of being one of the most biodiverse areas on the planet.

== Protected areas ==
- PNN Los Katíos: along the border with Panama between the Atrato Swamp and the Serranía de Darién.
- PNN Ensenada de Utria
- PNN Uramba Bahía Málaga
- PNN Isla Gorgona
- PNN Sanquianga: area of mangroves south of Guapí
- SFF Malpelo

== See also ==
- Tumbes–Chocó–Magdalena
