= Esmeraldas–Pacific Colombia mangroves =

Ecoregion of mangrove forests along the Pacific coast of Colombia and Ecuador

Esmeraldas-Pacific Colombia mangroves (NT1409)
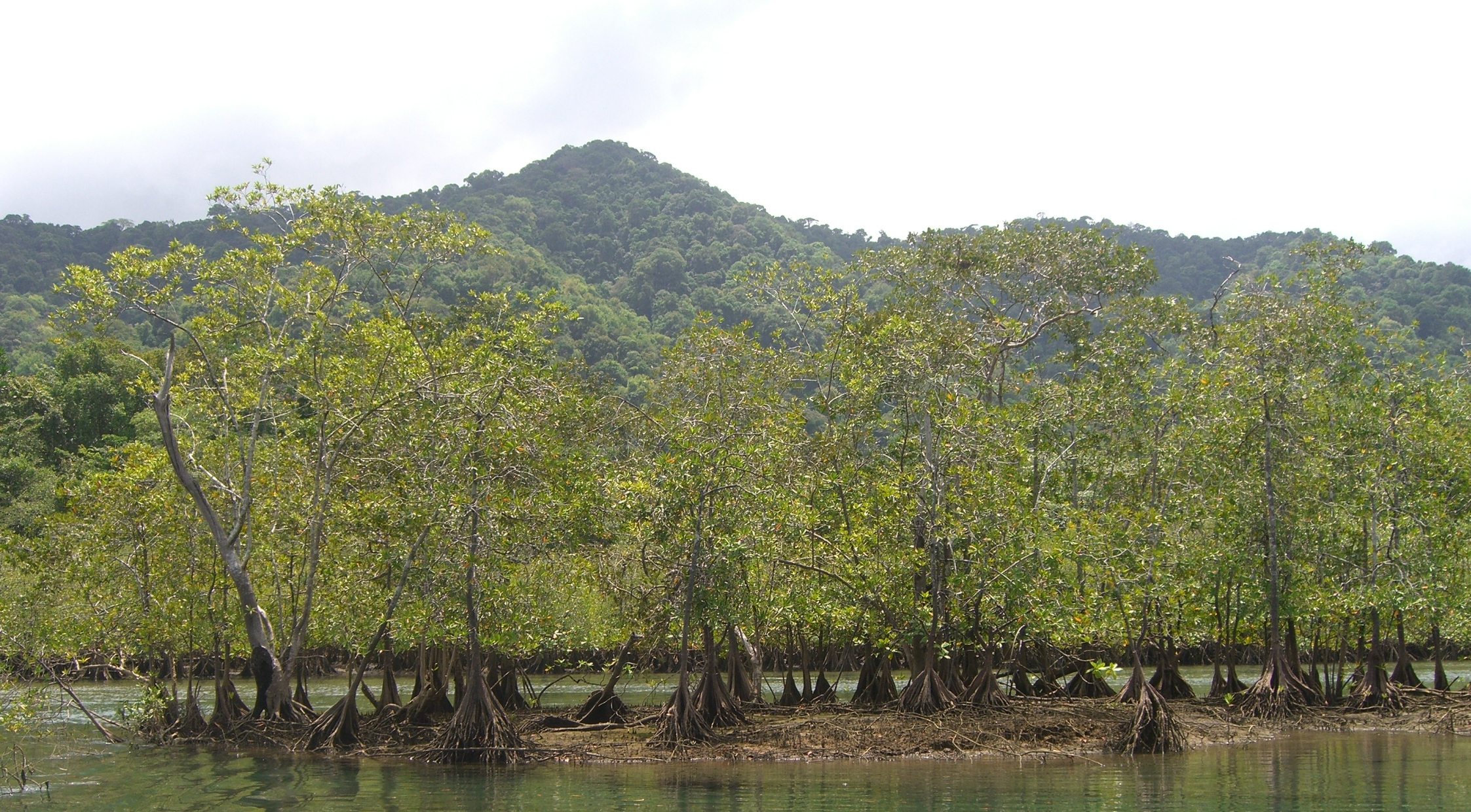
- Mangroves along the shore of the Utría National Natural Park

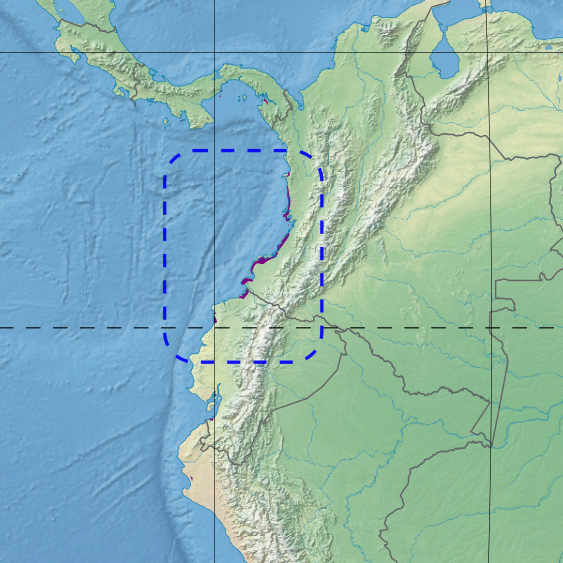
- Ecoregion territory (in purple)

Ecology
- Realm: Neotropical
- Biome: Mangroves

Geography
- Area: 6,500 km^{2} (2,500 mi^{2})
- Countries: Colombia, Ecuador
- Coordinates: 4.209°N 77.509°W
- Geology: Chocó, Tumaco Basins

The Esmeraldas-Pacific Colombia mangroves (NT1409) is an ecoregion of mangrove forests along the Pacific coast of Colombia and Ecuador. It is threatened by human population growth, leading to over-exploitation for wood and clearance for farming and aquaculture.

== Geography ==
=== Location ===
Mangroves are found along the coast of Colombia and Ecuador from the Gulf of Tribugá in the north to Mompiche Bay in the south. Between these bays there are extensive stands of mangroves in the mouths of the San Juan, Naya, Guapi, Mira and Esmeraldas rivers. The mangroves cover 6,500 square kilometres (2,500 sq mi). The largest block is the almost continuous strip from the Mataje River to Chanzará bay near Guapi. In 1996 it was estimated that 2,927 square kilometres (1,130 sq mi) of mangroves were growing in the four Colombian Pacific coast departments. The mangroves border the Chocó–Darién moist forests ecoregion along most of the Pacific coast of Colombia. In the extreme south they border the Western Ecuador moist forests.

=== Terrain ===
The ecoregion may be divided into two large zones to the north and south of Cabo Corrientes. (Note: Cabo Corrientes is at the southern end of the Gulf of Tribugá.) In the northern section the continental shelf is narrow, with the land rising steeply from the shore to around 1,500 metres (4,900 ft) above sea level. Many small rivers supply clear water to the ecoregion year round. There are strong low-intensity upwellings along the coast.

The southern section fringes a flat sedimentary coastal plain with a broad continental shelf. There are no coastal upwellings. Rocks are mostly lutite, sandstone and conglomerates, with some limestone. The mangroves along the low, alluvial coast that stretches over 400 miles (640 km) from Cabo Corrientes into Esmeraldas Province are the largest mangrove area in northwest South America, forming the tidal fringe of the coastal plain 8 to 50 kilometres (5.0 to 31.1 mi) wide. There are large river deltas at the mouths of the Mataje, Mira, Patía, Sanquianga and Guapi rivers, and smaller deltas at the mouths of about 25 smaller rivers. They provide more fresh water than in the north, and often carry much more sediment. The mangrove forest strips run parallel to the coast in the southern section and may extend inland for as much as 20 kilometres (12 mi) due to the 4 metres (13 ft) tides.

=== Climate ===
The mangroves adjoin wet tropical forest with temperatures over 24 °C (75 °F) and very high rainfall. The climate is influenced by the Intertropical Convergence Zone. Annual rainfall in the northern section is from 4,000 to 8,000 millimetres (160 to 310 in), while the southern section receives 1,000 to 4,000 millimetres (39 to 157 in).

== Ecology ==
The mangrove forests may release 8 to 15 tons of organic material per hectare each year, providing food to many other organisms. The forests play a crucial role as nurseries and food sources for fish, and also protect the coastline from erosion. The ecoregion is in the neotropical realm, in the mangroves biome. The Panama Bight Mangroves, a Global ecoregion, contains the Gulf of Panama mangroves, Esmeraldas-Pacific Colombia mangroves, Manabí mangroves and Gulf of Guayaquil-Tumbes mangroves.

=== Flora ===
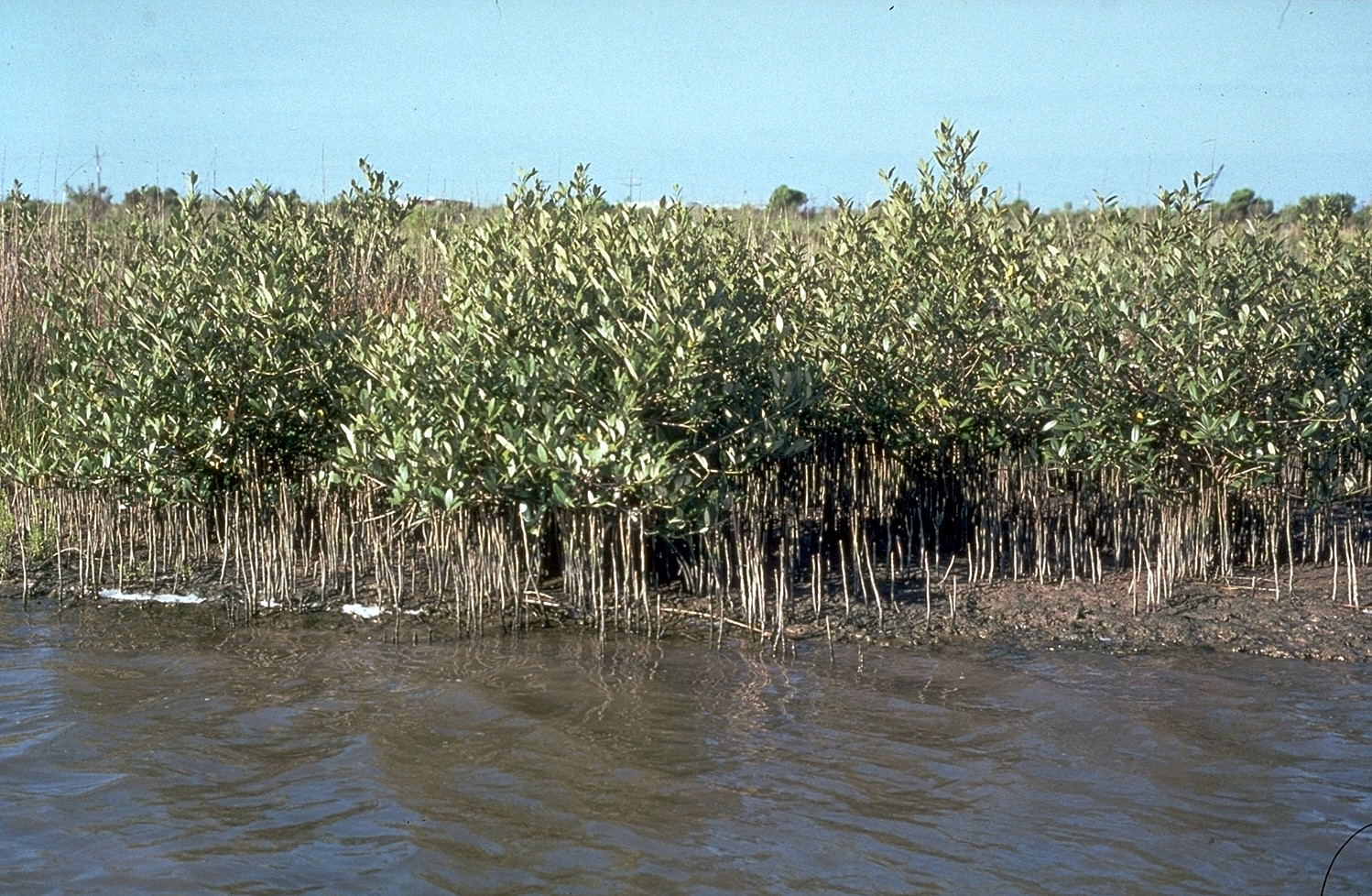
Stand of Avicennia germinans

Depending on the local topography and climate, mangrove formations include bar, inverse estuary, coastal, dwarf, border and small island. Compared to the Caribbean, the Pacific mangroves of Colombia have lower salinity due to the high rainfall and tidal action, and their zoning may be more dependent on stability of the substrate. The abundant nutrient-rich fresh water results in exuberant growth, with heights over 40 metres (130 ft), and high production of organic detritus. Bromeliads and orchids grow on the trunks of the mangroves, and their branches hold water and falling material.

Mangrove species include mangle caballero (Rhizophora harrisonii), red mangrove (Rhizophora mangle), Rhizophora racemosa, Samoan mangrove (Rhizophora samoensis), nato mangrove (Mora oleifera), black mangrove (Avicennia germinans), Avicennia tonduzzii, buttonwood (Conocarpus erectus), white mangrove (Laguncularia racemosa) and tea mangrove (Pelliciera rhizophorae). The Conocarpus erectus mangroves are rare, found as isolated individuals.

Most of the mangrove forest is a transition zone in which Mora oleifera and Euterpe species dominate. Mora oleifera is endemic to the Pacific Coast from Parrita in Costa Rica to Esmeraldas in Ecuador. Further inland there are freshwater marshes with plants such as golden leather fern (Acrostichum aureum), Virola species), Campnosperma panamensis, milk tree (Brosimum utile) and palms such as Mauritiella pacifica, sheath palm (Manicaria saccata) and Euterpe cuatrecasa.

Common plants include Amphitecna Gentry, black calabash (Amphitecna latifolia), Crenea patentinervis, açaí palm (Euterpe oleracea), coast cottonwood (Hibiscus tiliaceus), Lonchocarpus monilis, Mora oleifera, Pavonia rhizophorae, Phryganocydia phellosperma, mangle marica (Tabebuia palustris), Tuberostylis axillaris and Tuberostylis rhizophorae. Sandy areas have field sandbur (Cenchrus pauciflorus), Homolepis aturensis, and climbers such as beach bean (Canavalia rosea), bayhops (Ipomoea pes-caprae), fiddle-leaf morning glory (Ipomea stolonifera), Pectis arenaria and St. Augustine grass (Stenotaphrum secundatum). Bromeliaceae and Orchidaceae epiphytes that invade the canopy include Vrissia grandioliflora, Guzmania musaica and Heliconia bihai.

Core samples have shown that in the south of the Gulf of Tribugá dominant populations of Rhizophora mangroves have been relatively stable for the last 4,500 years. In recent years abundant Acrostichum aureum have appeared, probably introduced by humans. In one area of the northern gulf there have been populations of Pelliciera rhizophorae for about 2,600 years, but in another area the mangroves are from recent colonization.

=== Fauna ===
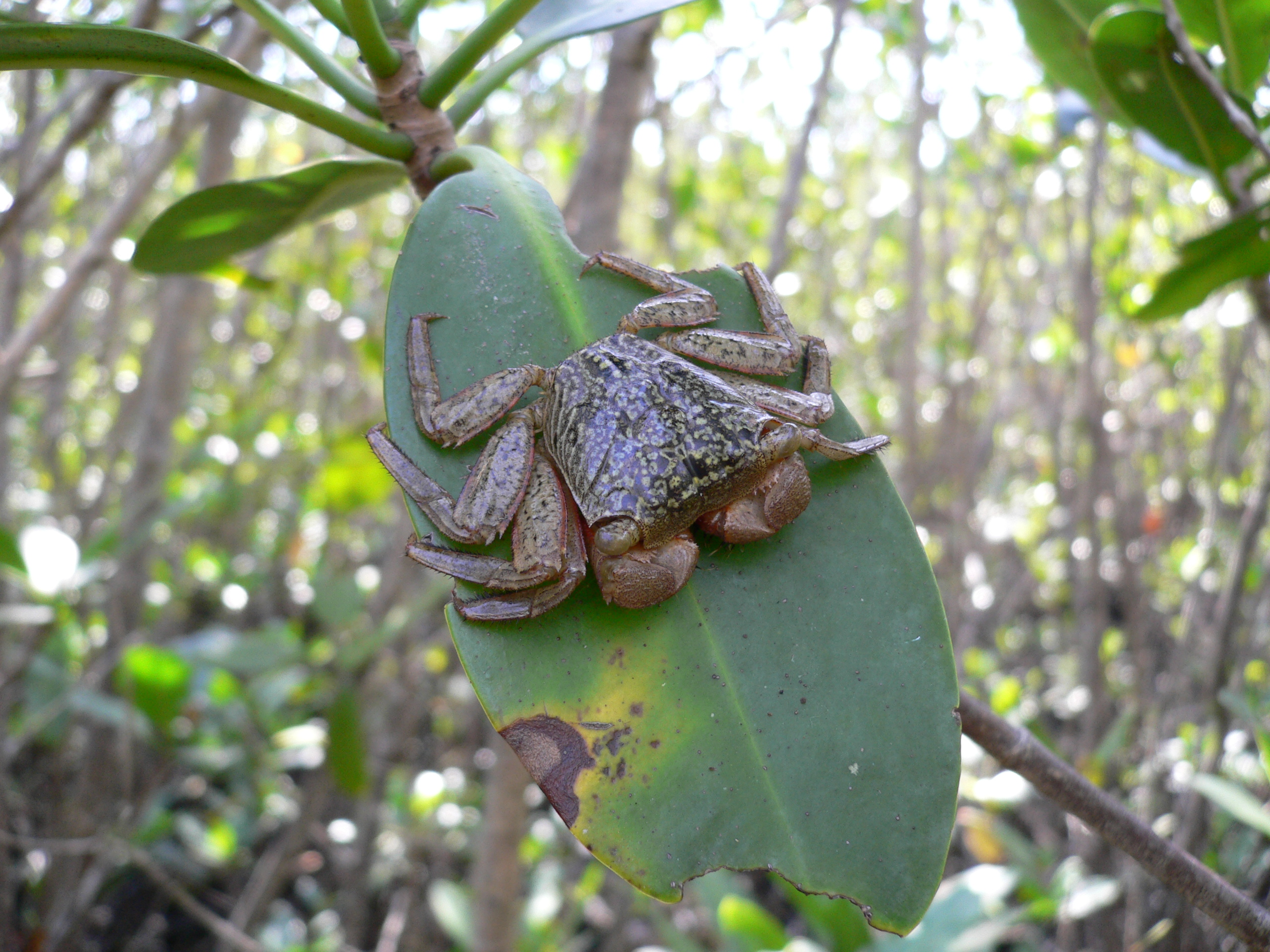
The mangrove tree crab (Aratus pisonii) is very common.

The mangroves host invertebrates, shellfish, fish, reptiles, birds and mammals. The mangrove cockle (Anadara tuberculosa) is important for artisanal fisheries in the south-central region. Reptiles include iguanas and snakes. Mammals include oncilla (Leopardus tigrinus), coypu (Myocastor coypus), deer, lowland paca (Cuniculus paca) and white-lipped peccary (Tayassu pecari). The mangroves are refuges for locally or regionally threatened species including bare-throated tiger heron (Tigrisoma mexicanum), American yellow warbler (Setophaga petechia), crab-eating raccoon (Procyon cancrivorus), American crocodile (Crocodylus acutus) and spectacled caiman (Caiman crocodilus).

Common bivalves include Anomia fidenas, Gould's shipworm (Bankia gouldi), pleasure oyster (Crassostrea corteziensis), thin purse-oyster (Isognomon janus), striate piddock (Martesia striata) and brown falsejingle (Pododesmus foliatus). Common gastropods include mangrove periwinkle (Littoraria scabra), Littorina fasciata, Littorina varia, Littorina zebra, great pond snail (Lymnaea stagnalis), Melampus carolianus, Nassarius wilsoni, ornate nerite (Nerita scabricosta), Thais kiosquiformis and Theodoxus luteofasciatus. Common crustaceans include grapsid crab (Armases angustum), Callodes gibbosus, Eurypanopeus transversus, Eurytium tristani, Glyptograpsus impressus, Latreutes antiborealis, Macrocoeloma villosum, Notolopas lamellatus, Panopeus chilensis, Panopeus purpureus, Pinnotheres angelicus, Cangrejo de pantano (Sesarma aequatoriale), Sholometopus occidentalis and Sholometopus rhizophorae. The mangrove tree crab (Aratus pisonii) is very common.

== Status ==
The World Wide Fund for Nature gives the ecoregion the status "Critical/Endangered". Mangroves are traditionally used for fuel, construction material, fishing equipment and as a source of tannin. They are threatened by expansion of towns, aquaculture, unsustainable extraction of wood, overfishing and clearance for farms or coconut plantations. Domestic and industrial pollution is a growing problem. The ecoregion is protected in Colombia by the Sanquianga National Natural Park and the Utría National Natural Park. Civil Society Natural Reserves are also starting to protect parts of northern Colombia.
