= Silverstoneia punctiventris =

Conservation status
- Endangered (IUCN 3.1)

Scientific classification
- Kingdom: Animalia
- Phylum: Chordata
- Class: Amphibia
- Order: Anura
- Family: Dendrobatidae
- Genus: Silverstoneia
- Species: S. punctiventris

Binomial name
- Silverstoneia punctiventris Grant and Myers, 2013

Species of amphibian

Silverstoneia punctiventris is a species of frog in the family Dendrobatidae. It is endemic to Colombia's Chocó region.

== Appearance ==
The adult male frog measures 16.8 to 17.6 mm (0.66 to 0.69 in) in snout-vent length and the adult female frog 17.7 to 20.3 mm (0.70 to 0.80 in). The skin of the frog's throat has dark brown or black spots, which scientists use to distinguish the frog from its congeners, which either have different spots or no spots at all. The skin of the dorsum is dark brown in color with a white stripe on each side of the body and a dark brown or black color between the ribs and the hips. There is some bronze striping near the lips. There is some yellow color on the hind legs and some green color on the bottoms of the hind legs. The ventrum and throat are white. The iris of the eye is gold in color.

== Defense ==
This frog has alkaloids and other volatile organic compounds. Scientists believe these chemicals may poison predators or at least make it taste and smell bad. They also believe the chemicals might serve as olfactory camouflage.

== Etymology ==
Scientists named this frog puncti for "dot" and ventris for "lower side" because of the spots on the lower side of its throat.

== Habitat and reproduction ==
This terrestrial, diurnal frog lives in lowland rainforests near clear, rocky-bottomed streams . It has been observed between 80 and 200 meters above sea level on Serranía del Baudó.

Male frogs are territorial, defending egg-laying sites with their calls. They also call to the females from perches. This terrestrial frog lives in lowland rainforests near clear, rocky-bottomed streams. This frog has been observed between 80 and 200 meters above sea level on Serranía del Baudó. Scientists infer that the female frog lays eggs in dead leaves on the ground and that, after the eggs hatch, the adult frogs carry the tadpoles to water, like most of its congeners, but they have yet to publish direct observations.

== Threats ==
The IUCN classifies this frog as endangered because of its small range. It may face other threats, but the remoteness of its habitat makes them difficult to assess. Deforestation associated with logging, mining, and illegal crops may affect the population. Scientists also believe that, now that the conflict between the government of Colombia and the guerillas has become less severe, people may capture adult frogs to sell in the international pet trade.

This frog lives near one protected park, Parque Nacional Natural Utría, and scientists infer that it may live within its boundaries.
