= Silverstoneia erasmios =

Conservation status
- Endangered (IUCN 3.1)

Scientific classification
- Kingdom: Animalia
- Phylum: Chordata
- Class: Amphibia
- Order: Anura
- Family: Dendrobatidae
- Genus: Silverstoneia
- Species: S. erasmios

Binomial name
- Silverstoneia erasmios (Rivero and Serna, 2000)

Synonyms
- Colostethus erasmios Rivero and Serna, 2000 "1995"

Species of frog

Silverstoneia erasmios is a species of frog in the family Dendrobatidae. It is endemic to Colombia where it is known from the Cordillera Occidental and Cordillera Central in the Antioquia Department.

Validity of this species is uncertain; females are indistinguishable from Silverstoneia nubicola but males are unknown. Its higher altitudinal range (to 1,940 m (6,360 ft) asl) than Silverstoneia nubicola (maximum elevation 1,300–1,600 m (4,300–5,200 ft)) suggests that it might be a distinct species. Other data (males, vocalizations, DNA samples) are needed to resolve this question.

== Description ==
Adult females measure 21–22 mm (0.83–0.87 in) in snout–vent length (based on two specimens); males are unknown. Ventral colouration is immaculate. Thigh colouration is light.

== Habitat ==
This terrestrial frog lives in gallery forests and primary rainforests. People have observed the frogs on trails in forests, in secondary forest, just outside forests, and near grazing areas.

The tadpoles develop in streams.

== Threats ==
The IUCN classifies this frog as endangered because of its small range and ongoing deforestation in favor of cattle grazing. Scientists have observed the fungus Batrachochytrium dendrobatidis on this frog, but they do not know its precise morbidity or mortality. Other frogs in the genus have become infected with Batrachochytrium dendrobatidis and not experienced significant declines. This fungus causes the disease chytridiomycosis.

The frog's range includes at least protected parks: Parque Nacional Natural Las Orquídeas and Parque Nacional Natural Tatamá.
