= Gulf of Tribugá =

- Golfo de Tribugá (Spanish)
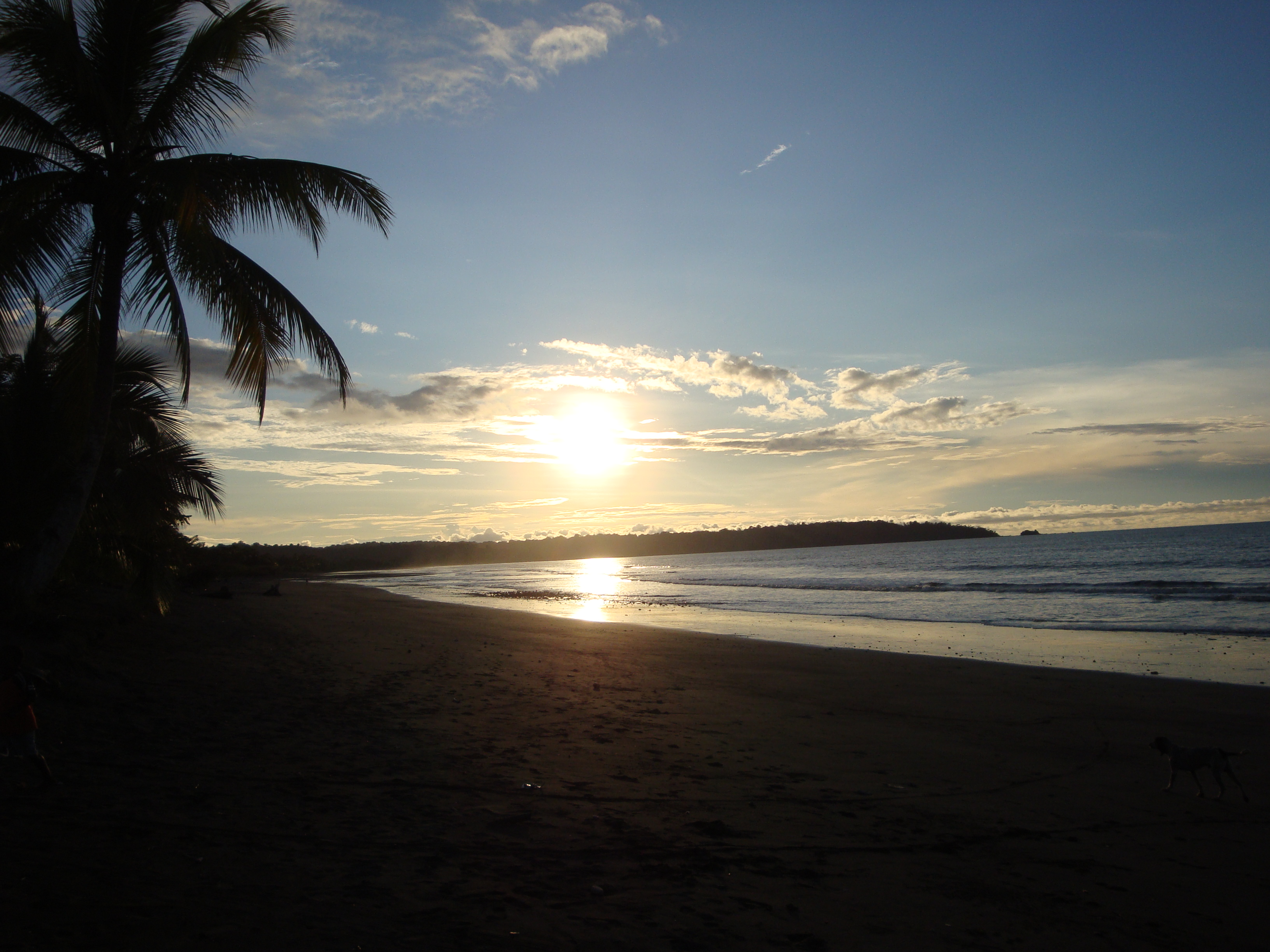
- Typical sunset

- Location in Colombia
- Location: Nuquí, Chocó, Colombia
- Coordinates: 5.767°N 77.270°W
- Basin countries: Colombia

The Gulf of Tribugá (Spanish: Golfo de Tribugá) is a gulf on Colombia's Pacific coast. It contains exuberant mangroves. The bay is a spawning ground for humpback whales. Tourist attractions include diving and watching whales and turtles. There are plans to build a major deep-water port at the village of Tribugá in the main river estuary.

== Location ==
The Gulf of Tribugá is on Colombia's Pacific Coast in the Chocó Department. It may be reached by sea from the port of Buenaventura or by air to the municipality of Nuquí. The Utría National Natural Park is to the north of the gulf. Cabo Corrientes is at the southern end. The municipality of Nuquí, with a population of 7,000, is in the center of the gulf and has an airport, hospital, high school and commercial infrastructure. There is an indigenous community of Emberá people in the basins of the Valle, Nuquí, Jurubidá, and Panguí rivers.

== Environment ==
The climate is a humid tropical forest, with average temperatures of 28 °C (82 °F). There is high rainfall, with the least rain in January and February. The Esmeraldes-Pacific Colombia mangroves are found along the coasts of Colombia and Ecuador from the Gulf of Tribugá, north to Mompiche Bay in the south. Core samples have shown that in the south of the gulf, dominant populations of Rhizophora mangroves have been relatively stable for the last 4,500 years. In recent years, abundant Acrostichum aureum have appeared, probably introduced by humans. In one area of the northern, gulf there have been populations of Pelliciera rhizophorae for about 2,600 years, but in another area, the mangroves are from recent colonization.

Land animals include bats, marsupials, anteaters, sloths, jaguars, pumas, otters, coatis, bush dogs, snakes, poison frogs and iguanas. There are 270 species of birds, including harpy eagles and herons.

Community divers have carried out retrieval of abandoned fishing gear (ghost gear) in the Gulf and participated in reef-monitoring activities supported by Conservation International Colombia and local partners.

== Tourist attractions ==
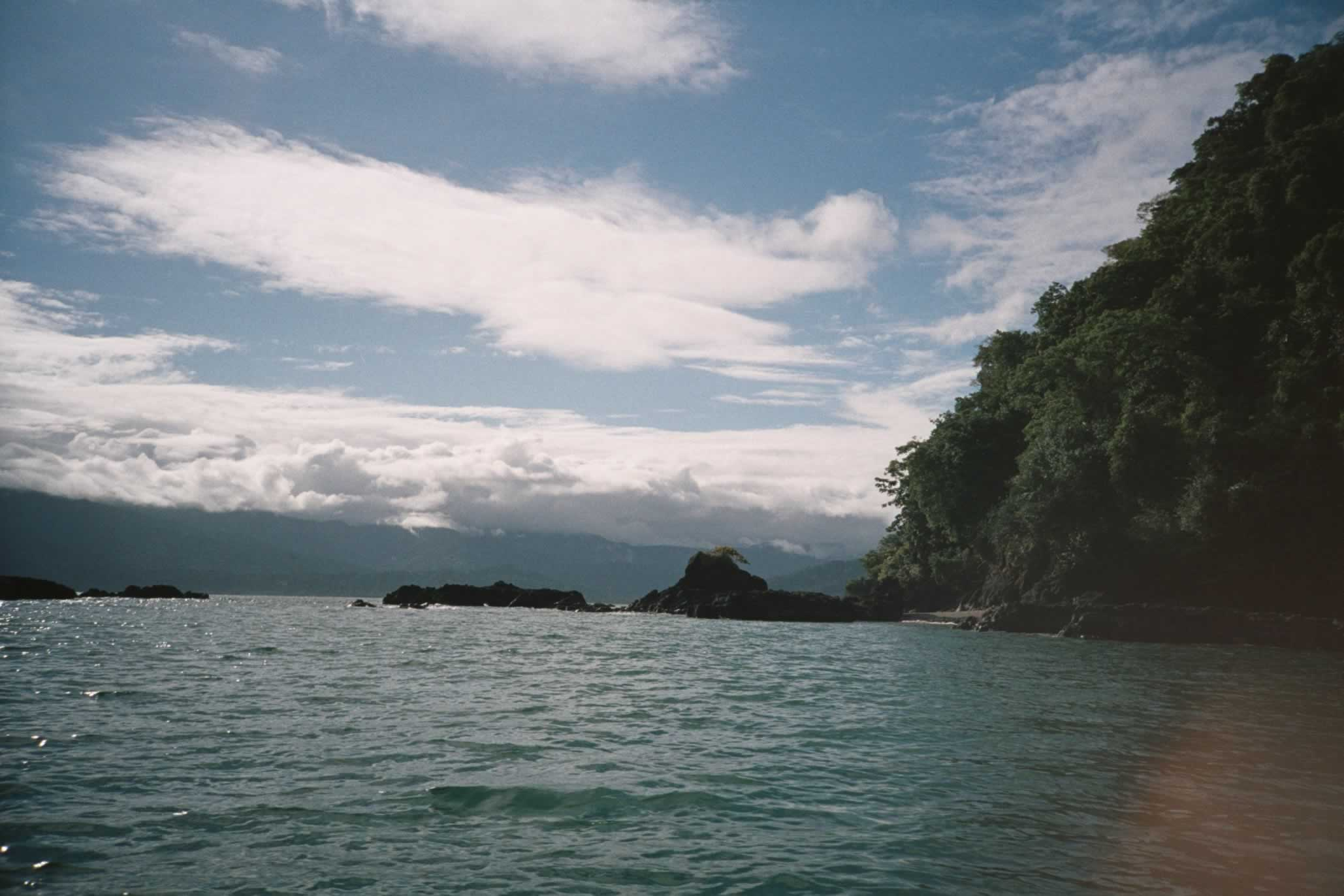
Pacific coast near Nuquí

The gulf has pristine beaches and exuberant mangroves. It is suitable for diving and is best used from March through August. There is a rocky sea bed, small corals, large schools of fish, and great diversity and color. Humpback whales use Utría Cove to give birth from August to October. From August to November, loggerhead sea turtles and hawksbill sea turtles spawn on the San Pichí, Blanca and Guachalito beaches.

== Planned port ==
There have been discussions over building a major port in the gulf, the Puerto de Tribugá. The deep water port would provide improved transport to Asia, bypassing the Panama canal. The route from Medellín to Tribugá via Quibdó is much shorter than the route to Buenaventura in the south. Tribugá has an access channel of just 2.5 kilometres (1.6 mi) that can be dredged to over 20 metres (66 ft) deep. There are no sediment problems and space for docks and long-term port developments. The port would have docks 3,600 metres (11,800 ft), covering 300 hectares (740 acres), a 3,000 metres (9,800 ft) straight access channel with an initial depth of 15 metres (49 ft) and a final depth of 20 metres (66 ft), and 250 hectares (620 acres) of land for the port.

In July 2014, it was reported that there was an informal commitment by the ICCO Group to start construction in 2016, if the project were approved. ICCO Group had said they were interested in participating in market and environmental impact studies. If there were no delays, the studies would be completed by December 2015, followed by the granting of the environmental license and then construction. An access railway from Quibdó to Nuquí and Tribugá would also require environmental studies, but these should proceed faster, so the railway could be built in time to transport materials to the port during construction. The Ministry of Transport endorsed the 75 kilometres (47 mi) railroad project.

The documentary film Expedicion Tribugá was released in November 2020, featuring scientists researching the local biodiversity and the inhabitants of the gulf explaining their concerns over the building of the port. As part of the Expedition Tribuga project, the gulf was declared a biodiversity "Hope Spot" by Mission Blue, an organization led by ocean scientist Dr. Sylvia Earle.

== Sources ==
- Carlos Borda, Northern South America: Northern Colombia, WWF: World Wide Fund for Nature
- Duque-Escobar, Gonzalo (15 April 2007), Un contexto para el puerto de aguas profundas en Tribugá, Colombia (in Spanish), Manizales: Universidad Nacional de Colombia
- "Golfo de Tribugá", Nuqui Ekari (in Spanish), 2013, archived from the original on 2016-10-30
- Jaramillo, Carlos; Bayona, German (March 2000), "Mangrove Distribution during the Holocene in Tribuga Gulf, Colombia", Biotropica, 32 (1), Association for Tropical Biology and Conservation, JSTOR 2663806
- Osorio, Adriana (24 July 2014), "Puerto de Tribugá tendría nuevo aliado estratégico", La Patria (in Spanish)
- Puerto de Tribugá (PDF) (in Spanish), Camara de Comercio de Manizales, 2017
