= Silverstoneia minima =

Conservation status
- Data Deficient (IUCN 3.1)

Scientific classification
- Kingdom: Animalia
- Phylum: Chordata
- Class: Amphibia
- Order: Anura
- Family: Dendrobatidae
- Genus: Silverstoneia
- Species: S. minima

Binomial name
- Silverstoneia minima Grant and Myers, 2013

Species of frog

Silverstoneia minima is a species of frog in the family Dendrobatidae. It is endemic to Colombia, having been found in Chocó and in Serranía del Baudó and the area surrounding Alto del Buey. These places are only accessible to humans by air and sea.

== Habitat ==
This frog has been found in forested ridges near rocky streams. However, assessors have heard it calling in the middles of forests, far from water. This frog has been observed between 300 and 1070 meters above sea level.

== Etymology ==
Scientists named this frog minima, the Latin term for "very small." This is the second smallest frog in Silverstoneia, after Silverstoneia minutissima ("extremely small").

== Reproduction ==
Scientists infer that the female frog lays eggs in leaf litter and that, after the eggs hatch, the adult frogs carry the tadpoles to water, like its congeners, but neither event has yet been reported as observed.

== Threats ==
The IUCN classifies this frog as data deficient, in part because its habitat is so remote and difficult to reach and in part because, in recent years, there has been armed conflict between guerrillas and the government of Colombia. What threats it faces are inferred to involve deforestation associated with subsistence logging, and possibly capture for the international pet trade, as with other visually striking frogs from Chocó.

This frog lives near one protected park, Parque Nacional Utría but has yet to be confirmed within it.

== Original description ==
- Grant T; Myers CW (2013). "Review of the frog genus Silverstoneia, with descriptions of five new species from the Colombian Choco (Dendrobatidae: Colosteninae)". American Museum Novitates (3784): 1–58. doi:10.1206/3784.2.
