= Silverstoneia minutissima =

Conservation status
- Near Threatened (IUCN 3.1)

Scientific classification
- Kingdom: Animalia
- Phylum: Chordata
- Class: Amphibia
- Order: Anura
- Family: Dendrobatidae
- Genus: Silverstoneia
- Species: S. minutissima

Binomial name
- Silverstoneia minutissima Grant and Myers, 2013

Species of frog

Silverstoneia minutissima is a species of frog in the family Dendrobatidae. It is endemic to Colombia, in such places as Chocó, Alto del Buey, Río Atrato, and Río San Juan.

== Appearance ==
The adult male frog measures 13.3–16.2 mm long in snout-vent length and the adult female frog 14.5–17.0 mm, making this the smallest frog in Silverstoneia. The skin of the flanks is dark brown in color with a green lateral stripe from the eye to the groin. The belly, throat, and chest are green-white in color. There are orange spots on the dorsal sides of the hind legs.

== Habitat ==
This frog lives in rainforests. It has been observed in the leaf litter between 60 and 700 meters above sea level. Scientists think this frog is diurnal, like other frogs in Silverstoneia.

== Etymology ==
Scientists named this frog minutissima, which is Latin for "extremely small." This is the smallest frog in Silverstoneia, even smaller than Silverstoneia minima. Minima means "very small."

== Reproduction ==
Scientists infer that the female frog lays eggs in leaf litter and that, after the eggs hatch, the adult frogs carry the tadpoles to streams. The scientists think this because that is what other frogs in Silverstoneia do.

== Threats ==
The IUCN classifies this frog as near threatened because of its small estimated range. It is difficult to assess the species because of the remoteness of its habitat. Scientists infer that what threats it faces come from deforestation associated with subsistence logging and from pollution associated with nearby gold mining.

This frog has been found near one protected park, Parque Nacional Utría, but scientists do not know if it lives in the park.

== Original description ==
- Grant T; Myers CW (2013). "Review of the frog genus Silverstoneia, with descriptions of five new species from the Colombian Choco (Dendrobatidae: Colosteninae)". American Museum Novitates (3784): 1–58. doi:10.1206/3784.2.
