= Silverstoneia dalyi =

Conservation status
- Endangered (IUCN 3.1)

Scientific classification
- Kingdom: Animalia
- Phylum: Chordata
- Class: Amphibia
- Order: Anura
- Family: Dendrobatidae
- Genus: Silverstoneia
- Species: S. dalyi

Binomial name
- Silverstoneia dalyi Grant and Myers, 2013

Species of frog

Silverstoneia dalyi is a species of frog in the family Dendrobatidae. It is endemic to Colombia, where it lives in the Rio San Juan watershed in Chocó.

== Appearance ==
The adult male frog measures 14.9–17.9 mm in snout-vent length and the adult female frog 15.9–19.0 mm. This frog can differ considerably in both color and morphology. The snout can be round or pointed. Frogs from the Quebrada Docordó area tend to have brown to tan dorsal coloration and frogs from Playa de Oro tend to have gray-brown. The flanks are black in color with an orange stripe, and axillary flash coloration. A bronze-white stripe goes over each shoulder. There is a dark brown stripe on each leg. The legs are transparent orange in color, showing the orange muscle underneath. There is a dark brown spot behind each side of the mouth. The ventrum is white or gray in color.

== Habitat ==
This frog lives in lowland rainforests, near streams. People have seen this frog between 100 and 250 meters above sea level. This frog is diurnal.

== Reproduction ==
The female frog lays eggs on the ground. After the eggs hatch, the male frog carries the tadpoles to streams, as many as six at a time.

== Threats ==
The IUCN classifies this frog as endangered because of its small range and the ongoing alterations to which that range is subject: subsistence logging, mining, and the cultivation of illegal crops.

== Original publication ==
- Grant T; Myers CW (2013). "Review of the frog genus Silverstoneia, with descriptions of five new species from the Colombian Choco (Dendrobatidae: Colosteninae)". American Museum Novitates (3784): 1–58. doi:10.1206/3784.2.
