= Silverstoneia gutturalis =

Conservation status
- Data Deficient (IUCN 3.1)

Scientific classification
- Kingdom: Animalia
- Phylum: Chordata
- Class: Amphibia
- Order: Anura
- Family: Dendrobatidae
- Genus: Silverstoneia
- Species: S. gutturalis

Binomial name
- Silverstoneia gutturalis Grant and Myers, 2013

Species of frog

Silverstoneia gutturalis is a species of frog in the family Dendrobatidae. It lives in Colombia, in Chocó, in the Río Atrato watershed.

== Habitat ==
This frog lives in shady lowland forests between 30 and 450 meters above sea level. This frog has only been found during the day, so scientists suspect it is diurnal. All specimens were collected in 1968 and 1970.

== Reproduction ==
Scientists infer that the female frog lays eggs on the leaf litter and, after the eggs hatch, the adult frogs carry the tadpoles to water, as other frogs in Silverstoneia do.

== Threats ==
The IUCN classifies this frog as data deficient. Scientists are unsure of the current state of its population or what threats it faces. However, the area where it lives is subject to subsistence logging and gold mining, which puts pollution in the water on which local amphibians rely. Scientists do not know if people catch this frog for the international pet trade, as has happened to other frogs and amphibians in Chocó.

== Original publication ==
- Grant T; Myers CW (2013). "Review of the frog genus Silverstoneia, with descriptions of five new species from the Colombian Choco (Dendrobatidae: Colosteninae)". American Museum Novitates (3784): 1–58. doi:10.1206/3784.2.
