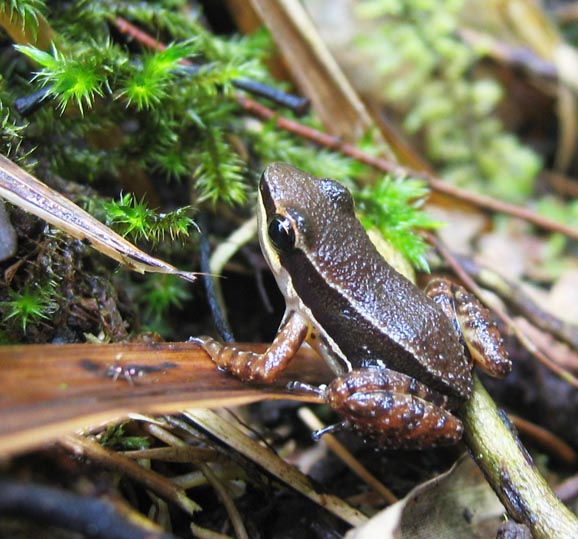
- Silverstoneia flotator in Panama

Conservation status
- Least Concern (IUCN 3.1)

Scientific classification
- Kingdom: Animalia
- Phylum: Chordata
- Class: Amphibia
- Order: Anura
- Family: Dendrobatidae
- Genus: Silverstoneia
- Species: S. flotator

Binomial name
- Silverstoneia flotator (Dunn, 1931)

Synonyms
- Phyllobates flotator Dunn, 1931; Colostethus flotator (Dunn, 1931)

= Silverstoneia flotator =

Species of amphibian

Silverstoneia flotator, the rainforest rocket frog, is a terrestrial, diurnal frog found in humid lowlands of Costa Rica and Panama. It is considered to be of least concern by the IUCN. The taxonomy is in need of a review, as it may consist of a complex of several species.

This frog has been observed between 10 and 865 meters above sea level, near rocky-bottomed streams. The frog has been observed in secondary forest, so scientists infer that it may tolerate some habitat disturbance.

The female frog lays eggs in leaf litter. After the eggs hatch, the male frog carries the tadpoles to streams.

The IUCN classifies this frog as least concern of extinction because of its large range, large population, and tolerance to habitat disturbance. What threat it faces comes from deforestation associated with agriculture, logging, and urbanization.
