= El Valle, Chocó =

El Valle
- Populated center
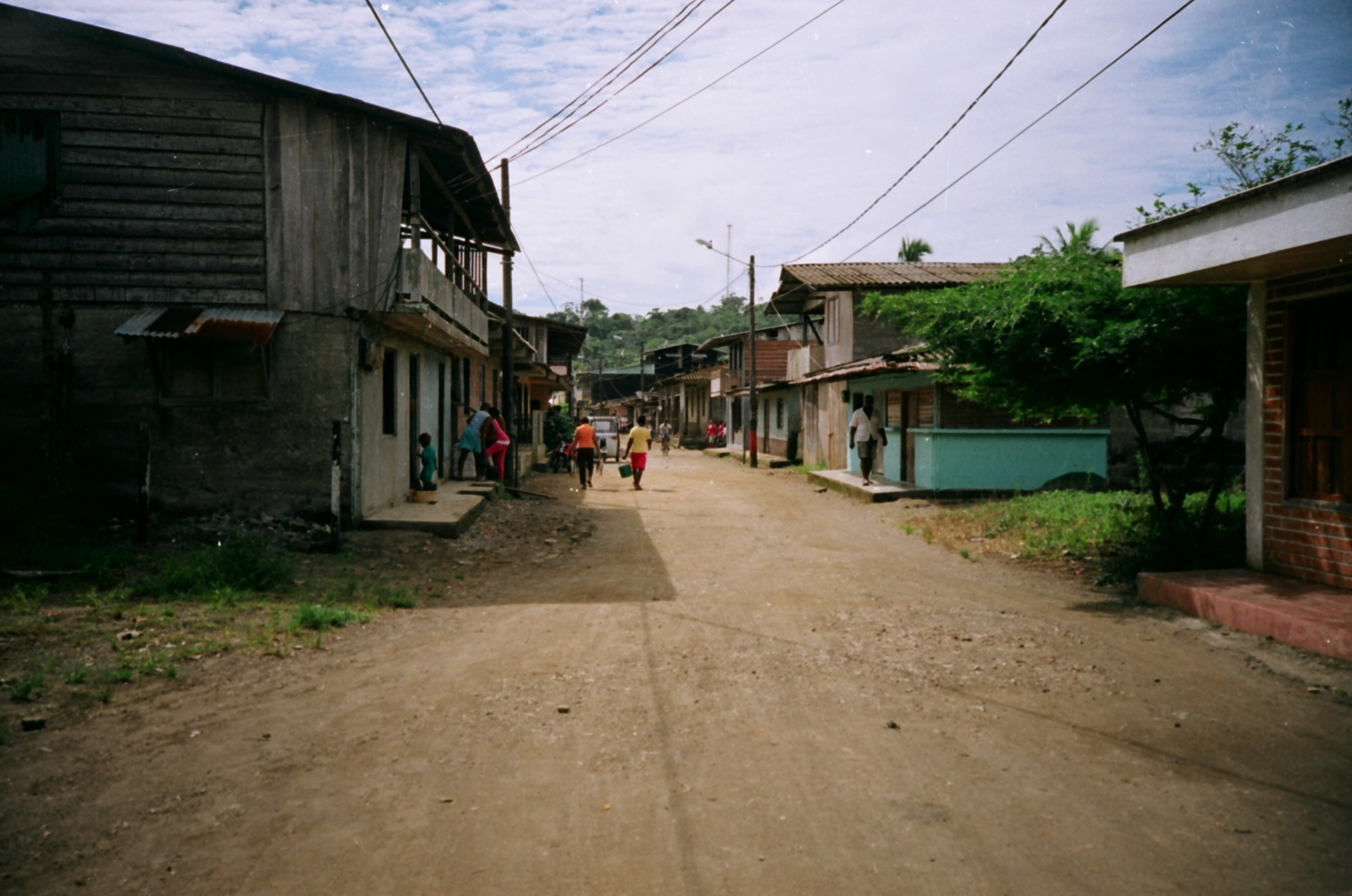
- Interactive map of El Valle
- Coordinates: 6°06′12″N 77°25′34″W
- Country: Colombia
- Department: Chocó
- Municipality: Bahía Solano
- Time zone: UTC-5 (Colombia Standard Time)

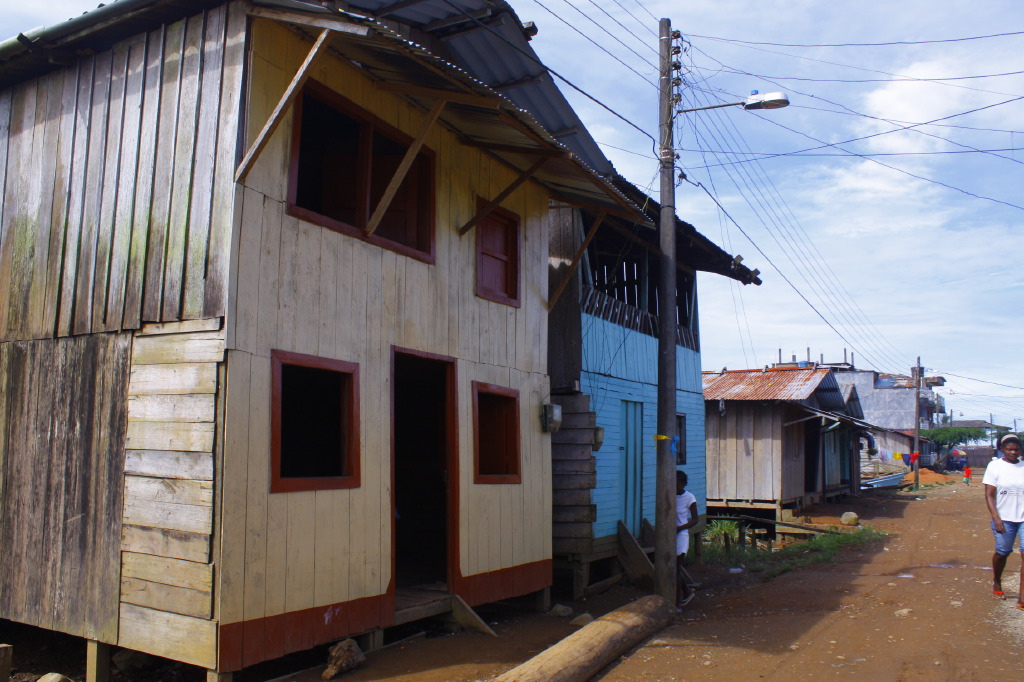
Typical street en El Valle

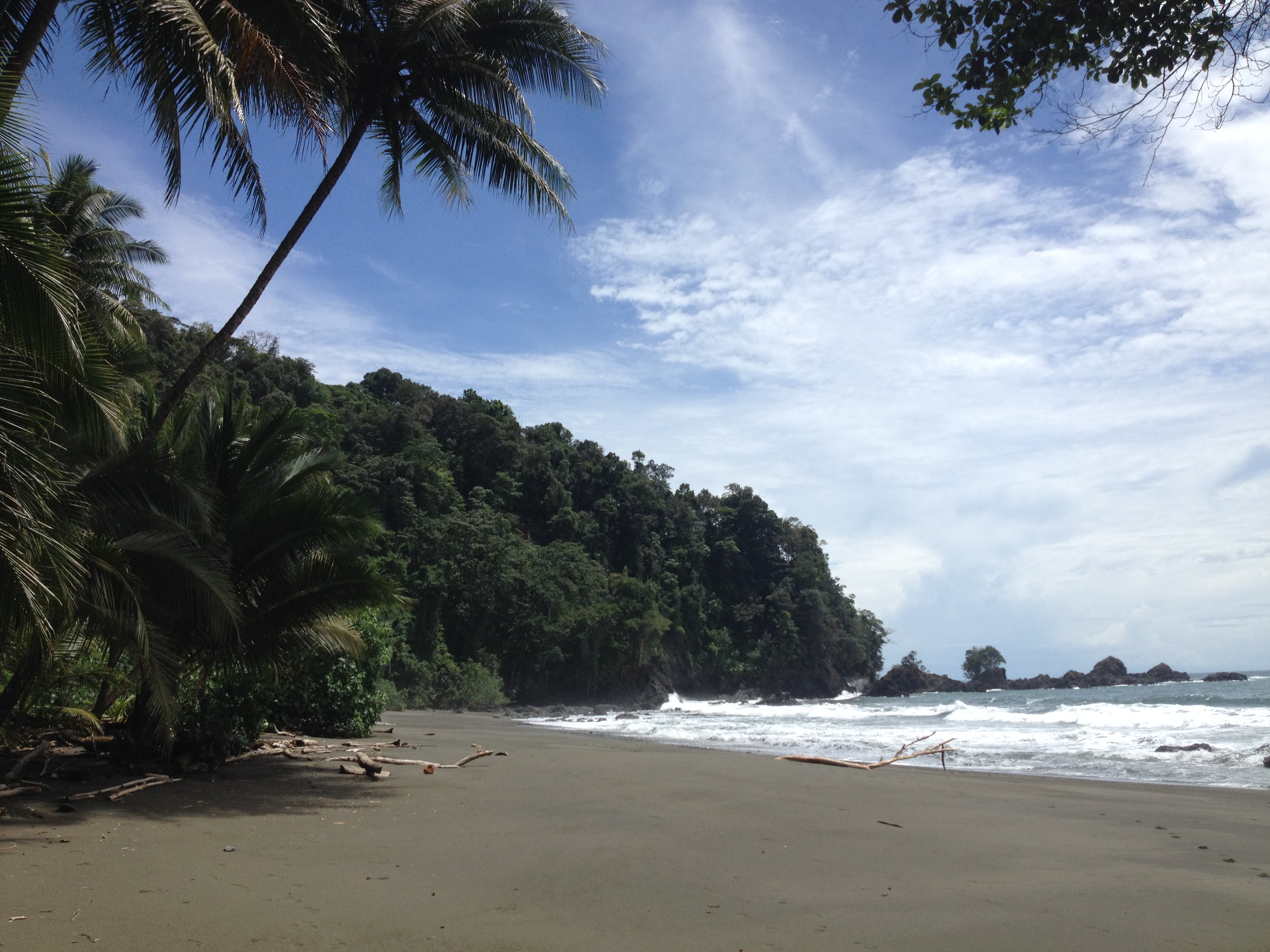
Playa Larga, 2 hours walk north of El Valle

El Valle is a populated center of Colombia and beach located in the Municipality of Bahía Solano, Department of Chocó, on Colombia's Pacific Coast, some 150 km west of Medellín, and roughly 100 km south of the border with Panama. There is one road connecting El Valle with the town of Bahía Solano, 18 km or 40 minutes down a half paved jungle road. There is no road access to the area from the rest of Colombia. To reach the area it is necessary to take a plane from Medellín or Quibdó, or boat from Buenaventura or Panama. El Valle is a fishing village located at the mouth of the Rio Valle, forming a fertile breeding ground that results in abundant fishing and scuba diving opportunities.

== Climate ==
El Valle has a very wet tropical rainforest climate (Af).

Climate data for El Valle
Month	Jan	Feb	Mar	Apr	May	Jun	Jul	Aug	Sep	Oct	Nov	Dec	Year
Mean daily maximum °C (°F)	29.8 (85.6)	30.0 (86.0)	30.2 (86.4)	29.9 (85.8)	29.4 (84.9)	29.2 (84.6)	29.4 (84.9)	29.2 (84.6)	28.6 (83.5)	28.5 (83.3)	28.8 (83.8)	29.1 (84.4)	29.3 (84.8)
Daily mean °C (°F)	26.0 (78.8)	26.0 (78.8)	26.3 (79.3)	26.2 (79.2)	26.0 (78.8)	25.8 (78.4)	25.9 (78.6)	25.8 (78.4)	25.5 (77.9)	25.5 (77.9)	25.5 (77.9)	25.7 (78.3)	25.9 (78.5)
Mean daily minimum °C (°F)	22.2 (72.0)	22.1 (71.8)	22.4 (72.3)	22.5 (72.5)	23.6 (74.5)	22.5 (72.5)	22.4 (72.3)	22.4 (72.3)	22.5 (72.5)	22.5 (72.5)	22.2 (72.0)	22.3 (72.1)	22.5 (72.4)
Average rainfall mm (inches)	310 (12.2)	193 (7.6)	222 (8.7)	366 (14.4)	511 (20.1)	473 (18.6)	506 (19.9)	597 (23.5)	585 (23.0)	768 (30.2)	664 (26.1)	472 (18.6)	5,667 (222.9)
