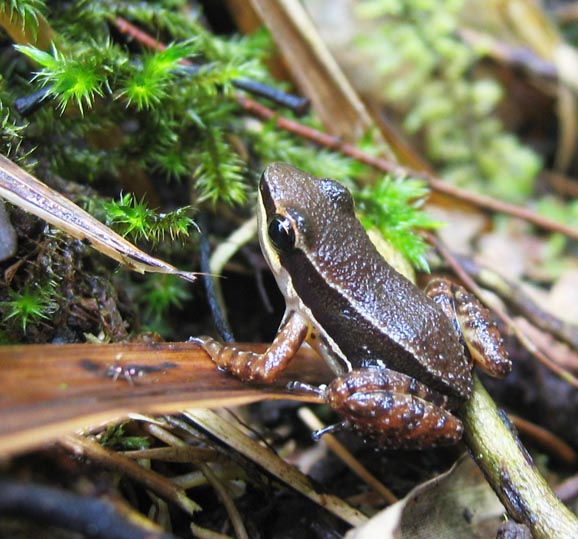
- Silverstoneia flotator from Panama

Scientific classification
- Kingdom: Animalia
- Phylum: Chordata
- Class: Amphibia
- Order: Anura
- Family: Dendrobatidae
- Subfamily: Colostethinae
- Genus: Silverstoneia; Grant et al., 2006

Type species
- Silverstoneia nubicola Dunn, 1924

Diversity
- 8 species (see text)

= Silverstoneia =

Genus of amphibians

Silverstoneia is a genus of poison dart frogs (family Dendrobatidae) from southern Central America and northern South America, between southwestern Costa Rica and southwestern Colombia. It is named in honour of Phillip A. Silverstone, an expert on dendrobatoid frogs.

== Description ==
Silverstoneia are small frogs, with adult size <22 mm (0.87 in) in snout–vent length. They have brown, cryptic colouration in the dorsum. They have a pale oblique lateral stripe as well as pale ventrolateral stripe, but no pale dorsolateral stripe (except for some populations of Silverstoneia flotator in Costa Rica). Dorsal skin texture is granular posteriorly.

== Species ==
There are eight species of Silverstoneia:

- Silverstoneia dalyi Grant and Myers, 2013
- Silverstoneia erasmios (Rivero and Serna, 2000)
- Silverstoneia flotator (Dunn, 1931)
- Silverstoneia gutturalis Grant and Myers, 2013
- Silverstoneia minima Grant and Myers, 2013
- Silverstoneia minutissima Grant and Myers, 2013
- Silverstoneia nubicola (Dunn, 1924)
- Silverstoneia punctiventris Grant and Myers, 2013
