= Cabo Corrientes, Chocó =

Cape in Chocó Department, Colombia

Cabo Corrientes
- Cape
- Location within Colombia
- Coordinates: 5.483568°N 77.537088°W
- Water bodies: Pacific Ocean

Cabo Corrientes is a cape on the Pacific coast of Colombia in the Chocó Department.

Cabo Corrientes is at the southern end of the Gulf of Tribugá. The cape is about 100 kilometres (62 mi) north of the Quebrada de Togoromá. The coast to the south has a chain of low barrier islands, less than 2 metres (6 ft 7 in) high, behind which there are lagoons, mangrove swamps and a narrow belt of freshwater swamps. The cape divides the Esmeraldes-Pacific Colombia mangroves ecoregion into two large zones, one to the north and the other to the south.

Cabo Corrientes is close to Nuquí, to the north, where the government is planning to build a major port.

== Sources ==
- "Cabo Corrientes - Choco Colombiano", City TV
- Carlos Borda, Northern South America: Northern Colombia, WWF: World Wide Fund for Nature
- "Golfo de Tribugá", Nuqui Ekari (in Spanish), 2013, archived from the original on 2016-10-30
- Pacific Coast: Cabo Corrientes-Togoromá, U.S. Geological Survey
