= Reyes Murillo Airport =

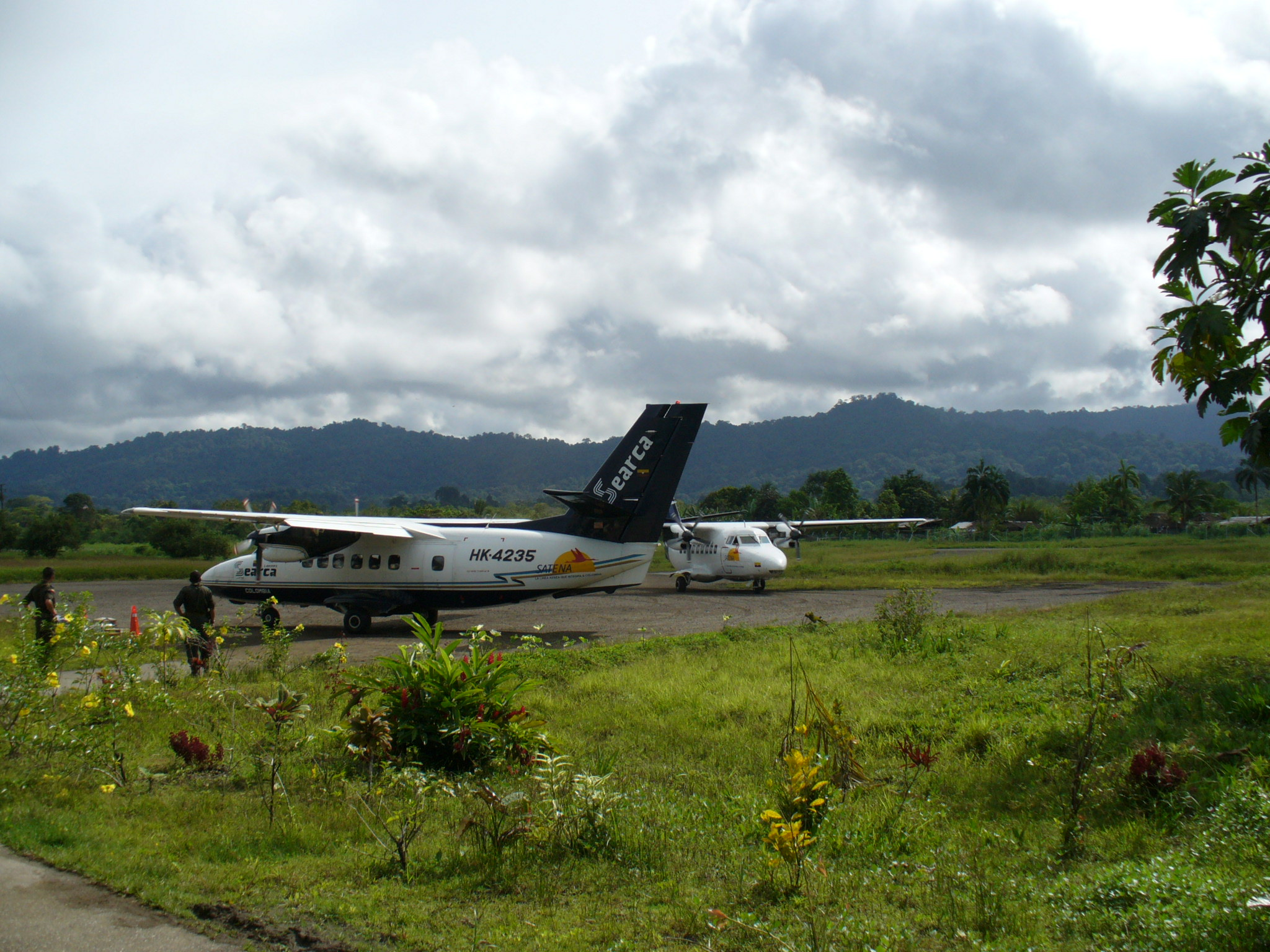
- IATA: NQU; ICAO: SKNQ

Summary
- Airport type: Public
- Serves: Nuquí, Colombia
- Elevation AMSL: 12 ft / 4 m
- Coordinates: 5°42′35″N 77°15′45″W

Map
- Location of the airport in Colombia

Runways
Direction	Length		Surface
Direction	m	ft	Surface
05/23	1,200	3,937	Asphalt
- Sources: SkyVector Google Maps

Reyes Murillo Airport (IATA: NQU, ICAO: SKNQ) is an airport serving Nuquí, a Pacific coast town in the Chocó Department of Colombia.

The Nuqui non-directional beacon (Ident: NQI) is located on the field.

== Airlines and destinations ==
Airlines	Destinations
Pacifica de Aviacion	Medellín–Olaya Herrera, Quibdó
SATENA	Cali, Medellín–Olaya Herrera, Quibdó

== See also ==
- Transport in Colombia
- List of airports in Colombia
