= Silverstoneia nubicola =

Conservation status
- Vulnerable (IUCN 3.1)

Scientific classification
- Kingdom: Animalia
- Phylum: Chordata
- Class: Amphibia
- Order: Anura
- Family: Dendrobatidae
- Genus: Silverstoneia
- Species: S. nubicola

Binomial name
- Silverstoneia nubicola (Dunn, 1924)

Synonyms
- Phyllobates nubicola Dunn, 1924; Colostethus nubicola (Dunn, 1924)

Species of frog

Silverstoneia nubicola (Boquete rocket frog) is a species of frog in the family Dendrobatidae. It is found in western Colombia, Panama, and southwestern Costa Rica.

== Description ==
Males measure 15–21 mm (0.59–0.83 in) and females 16–22 mm (0.63–0.87 in) in snout–vent length. Males have a swollen middle finger. The dorsum is dark brown, becoming black along the sides. A thin cream-colored line, extending from the groin to the eye, separates the brown and black areas. A second light line extends from the upper lip to the groin, bordering the black sides below; the latter line is more evident in males because of their black throat and chest. The ventral surface is pale yellow in females.

== Reproduction ==
Breeding occurs throughout the year. Males call from their territories on the forest floor in early morning and late afternoon. Eggs are laid in leaf litter in the male territories. Males carry the newly hatched tadpoles to streams where they continue development.

== Habitat and conservation ==
This terrestrial frog lives in rainforests between 0 and 1600 meters above sea level. It has also been observed in secondary forest and on tree farms. It is threatened by chytridiomycosis, which has killed other amphibians nearby, and habitat loss in favor of agriculture, cattle grazing, and logging. Nearby gold mining also pollutes the water upon which the frogs rely.
