= Nuquí =

Coordinates: 5°43′N 77°16′W

- Municipality and town
- Flag

- Location of the municipality and town of Nuquí in the Chocó Department of Colombia.

- Location in Colombia Nuquí (Colombia)
- Country: Colombia
- Department: Chocó Department

Population (2017)
  - Total: 8,800
- Time zone: UTC-5 (Colombia Standard Time)

Nuquí is a municipality and town in the Chocó Department, Colombia. The municipality of Nuquí is located in the department of Chocó in the Western part of Colombia between the mountainous area of Baudó and the Pacific Ocean. Nuquí has a great cultural diversity as well as a big variety of flora and fauna. Nuquí has 8096 inhabitants, 3095 of which live in the municipal capital. The majority of the population are Afro-Colombians, another part of the population is represented by members of indigenous tribes. Nuquí was founded as a municipality in 1915, before it was a sub-division of the municipality Valle, Chocó.

Nuquí is the original hometown of members of the acclaimed Latin hip hop and urbano group, ChocQuib Town; the band released a song titled “Nuquí (Te Quiero Para Mí)”, with the song’s music video being filmed exclusively in and around Nuquí and its picturesque beaches.

Nuquí is served by the Reyes Murillo Airport.

== Villages of the municipality of Nuquí ==
- Arusí (Touristic)
- Coquí (Touristic)
- Joví (Touristic)
- Jurubirá
- Panguí
- Termales (Touristic)
- Tribugá

== Economy ==
- Fishing
- Small-scale livestock farming and agriculture (banana, rice, cacao, corn, coconut, yuca and other tubers).
- Tourism: Ecotourism and community-based tourism. The municipality contains part of the Utría National Natural Park.

== Tourism sites ==
- Hot springs
- Beaches of Coqui
- Mangrove forests of Coquí for tours in canoes
- River of Joví for river tours
- Guachalito
- Surfing zones: Playa Olímpica, Guachalito near Terquito beach

== Climate ==
Nuquí has a very wet tropical rainforest climate (Af) with very heavy rainfall year-round.

Climate data for Nuquí
Month	Jan	Feb	Mar	Apr	May	Jun	Jul	Aug	Sep	Oct	Nov	Dec	Year
Mean daily maximum °C (°F)	30.9 (87.6)	30.9 (87.6)	31.2 (88.2)	31.1 (88.0)	30.8 (87.4)	30.6 (87.1)	30.7 (87.3)	30.5 (86.9)	30.2 (86.4)	29.9 (85.8)	30.1 (86.2)	30.3 (86.5)	30.6 (87.1)
Daily mean °C (°F)	26.4 (79.5)	26.2 (79.2)	26.5 (79.7)	26.6 (79.9)	26.4 (79.5)	26.2 (79.2)	26.3 (79.3)	26.2 (79.2)	26.1 (79.0)	25.8 (78.4)	25.9 (78.6)	26.0 (78.8)	26.2 (79.2)
Mean daily minimum °C (°F)	21.9 (71.4)	21.6 (70.9)	21.9 (71.4)	22.1 (71.8)	22.1 (71.8)	21.9 (71.4)	21.9 (71.4)	21.9 (71.4)	22.0 (71.6)	21.8 (71.2)	21.7 (71.1)	21.8 (71.2)	21.9 (71.4)
Average precipitation mm (inches)	411 (16.2)	284 (11.2)	348 (13.7)	464 (18.3)	568 (22.4)	576 (22.7)	546 (21.5)	633 (24.9)	526 (20.7)	601 (23.7)	585 (23.0)	484 (19.1)	6,026 (237.4)
Source: Climate-Data.org

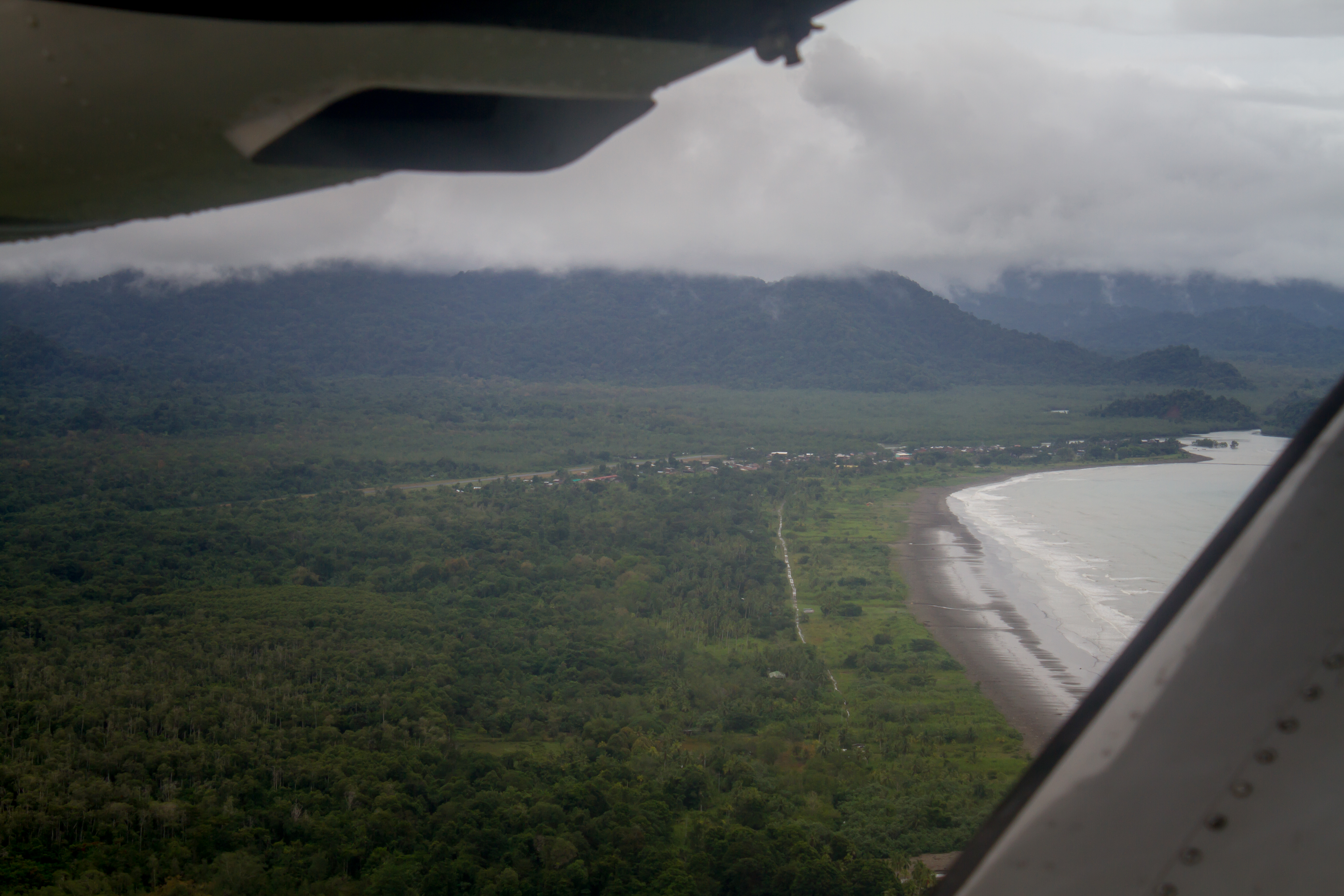
The town of Nuqui in Chocó Department, Colombia - 2017

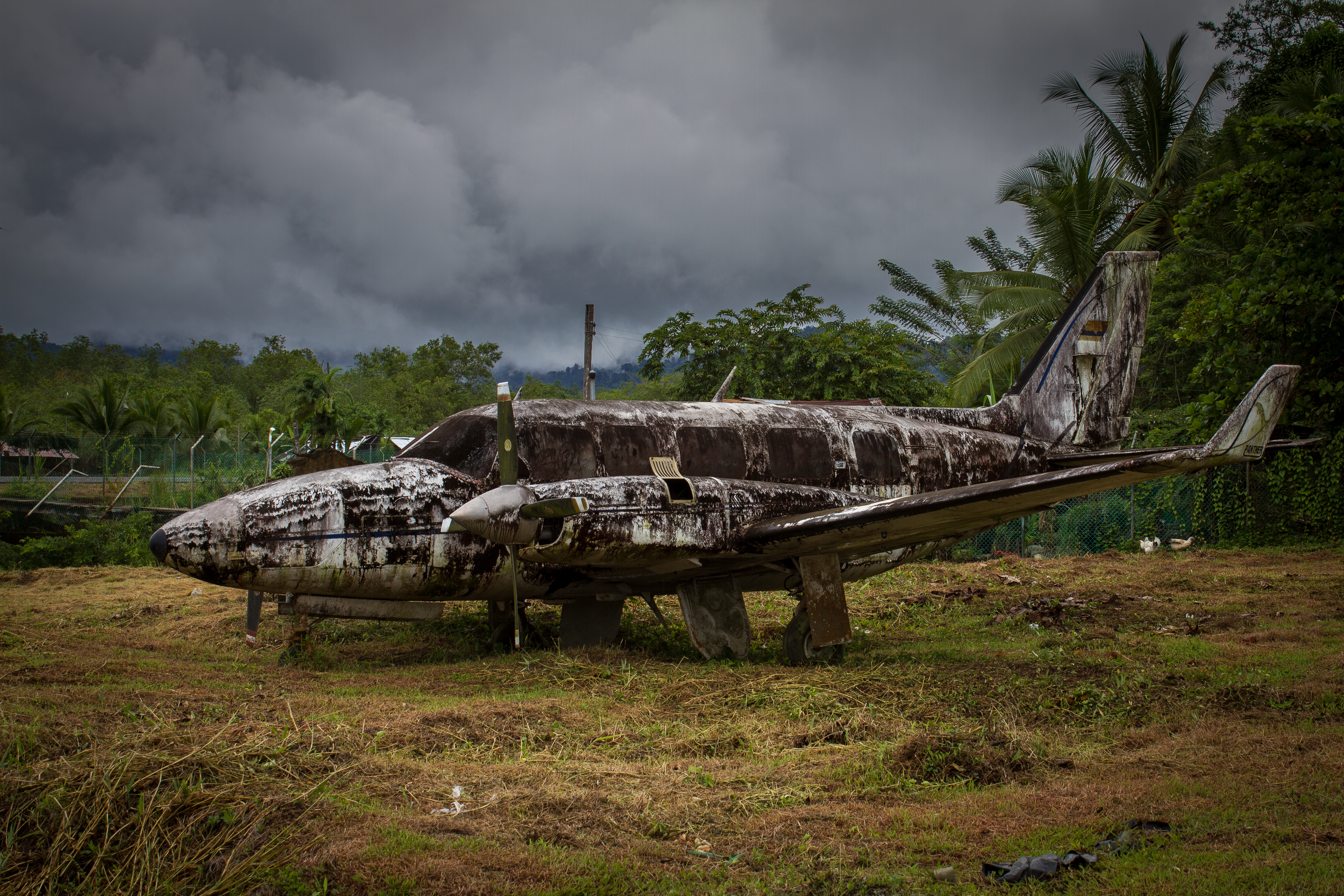
An airplane at Reyes Murillo Airport in Nuqui, Chocó, Colombia - 2017

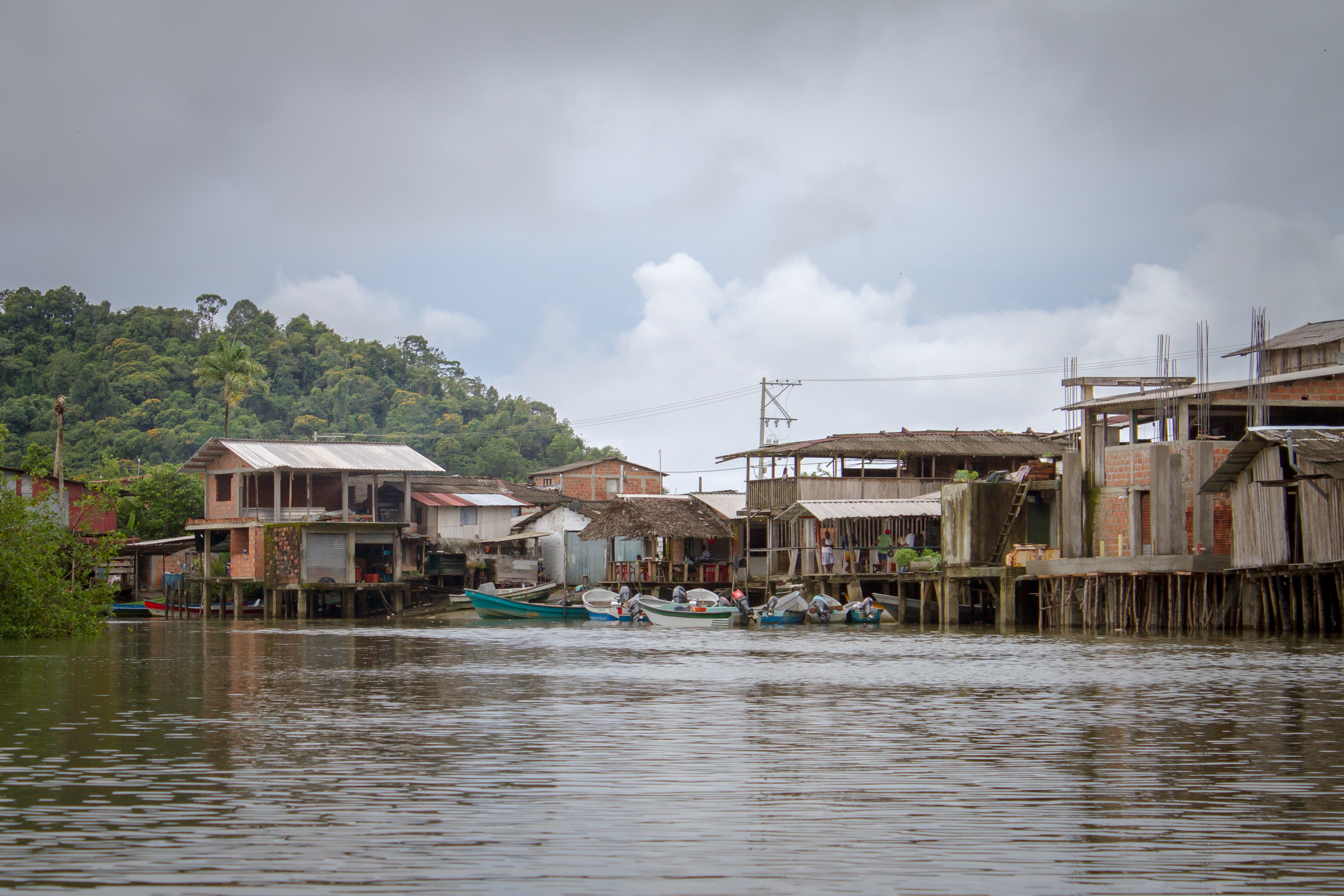
The town of Nuqui in Chocó Department, Colombia - 2017

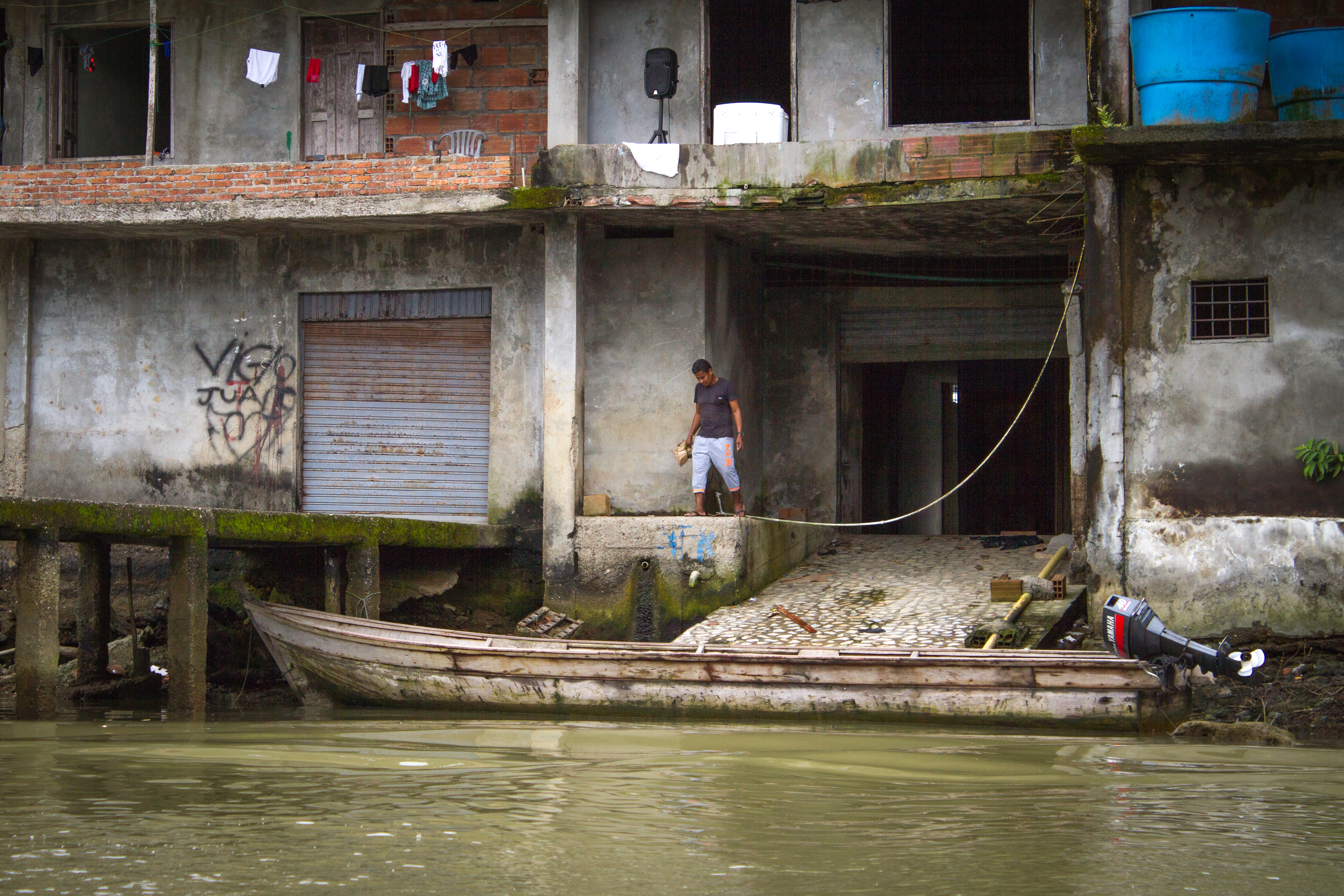
A building in the town of Nuqui in Chocó Department, Colombia - 2017

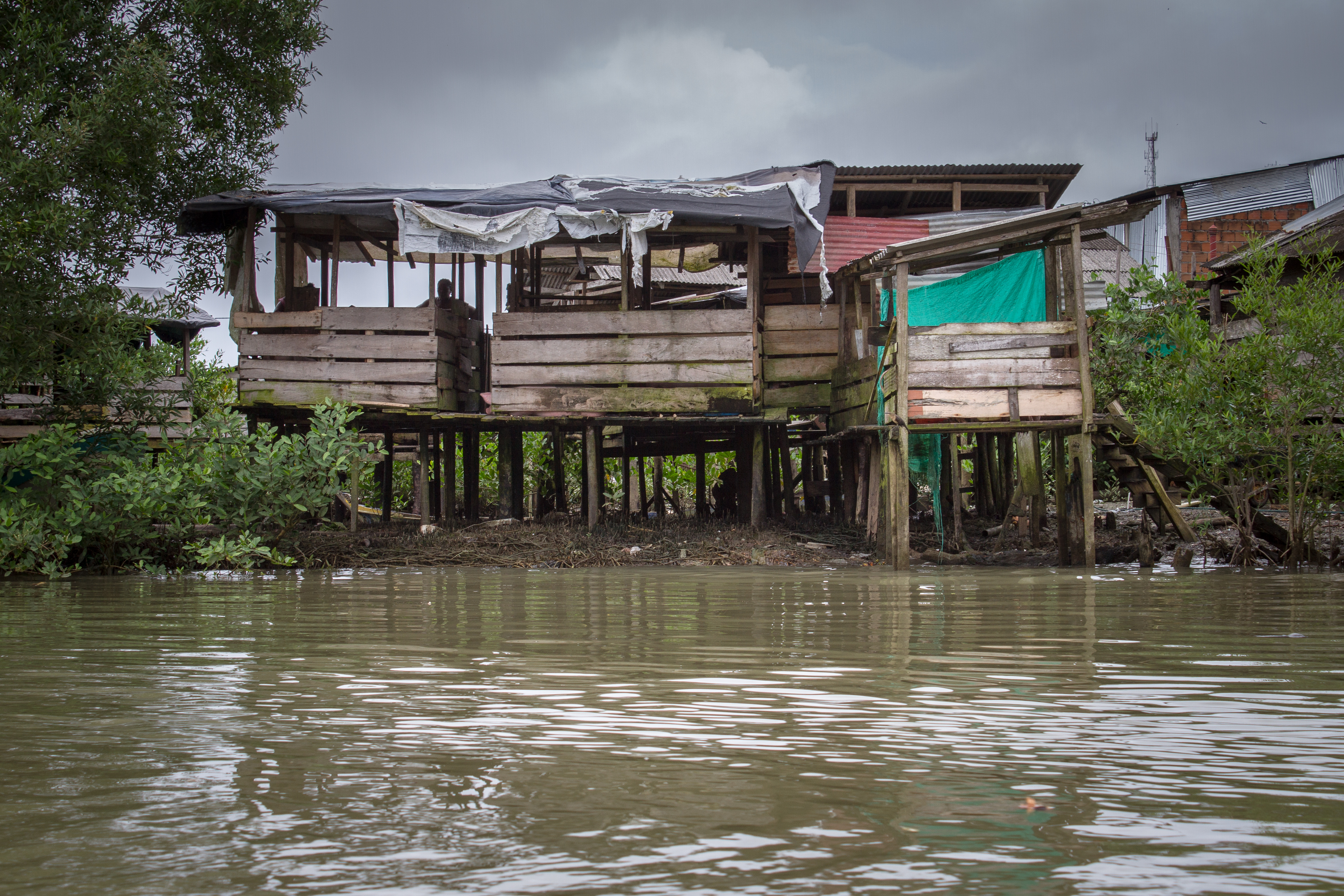
A building in the town of Nuqui in Chocó Department, Colombia - 2017

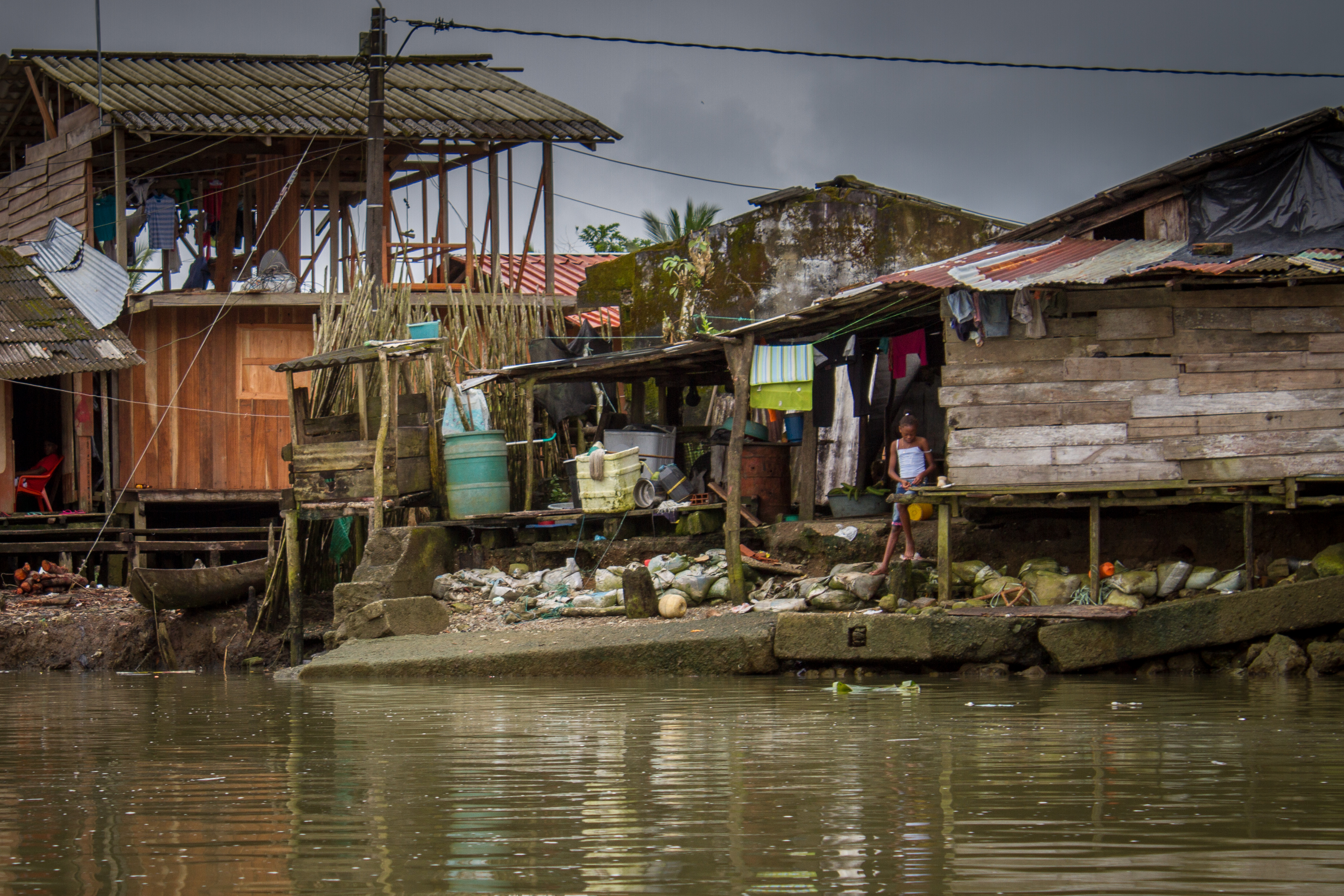
A dock in the town of Nuqui in Chocó Department, Colombia - 2017

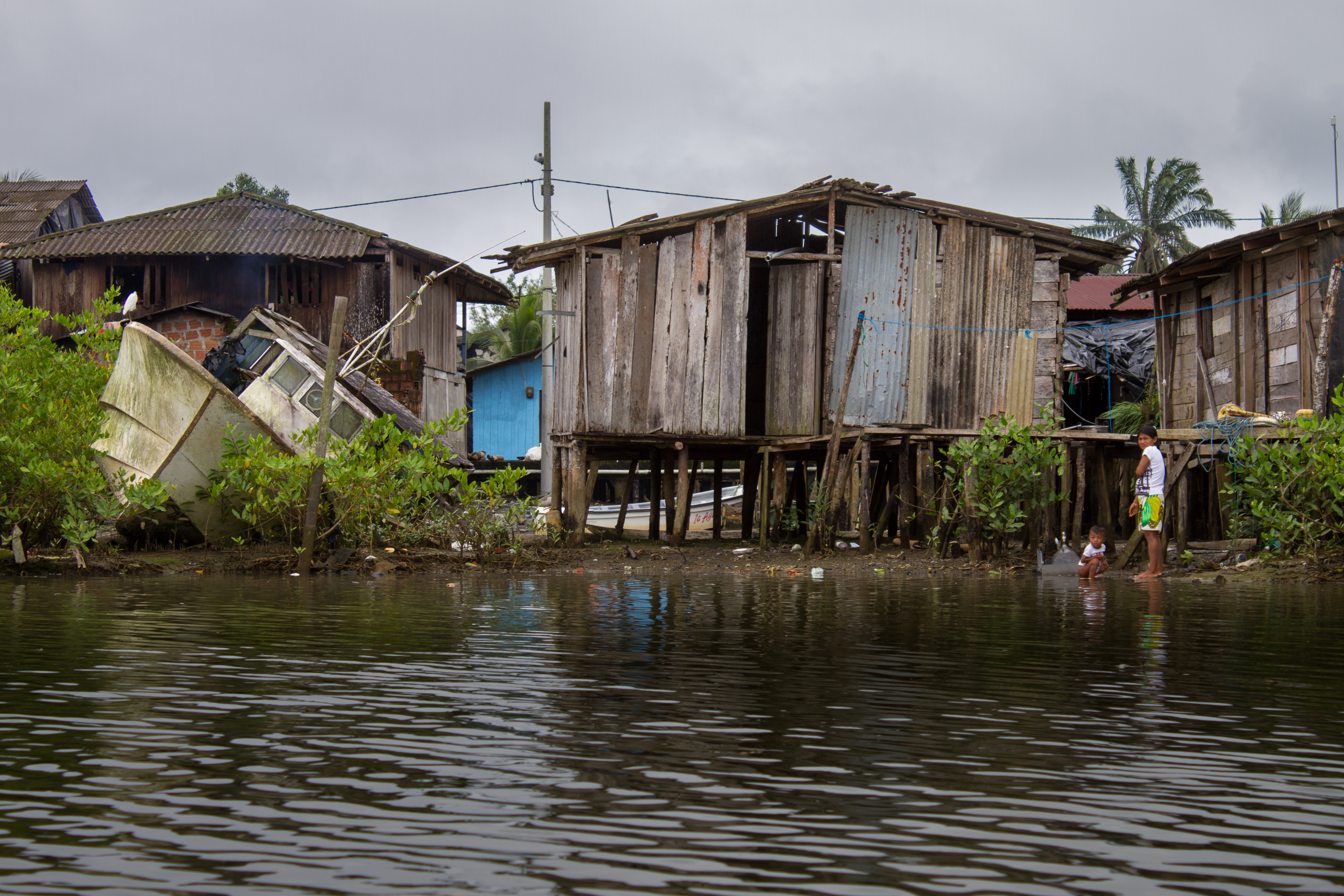
Buildings in the town of Nuqui in Chocó Department, Colombia - 2017

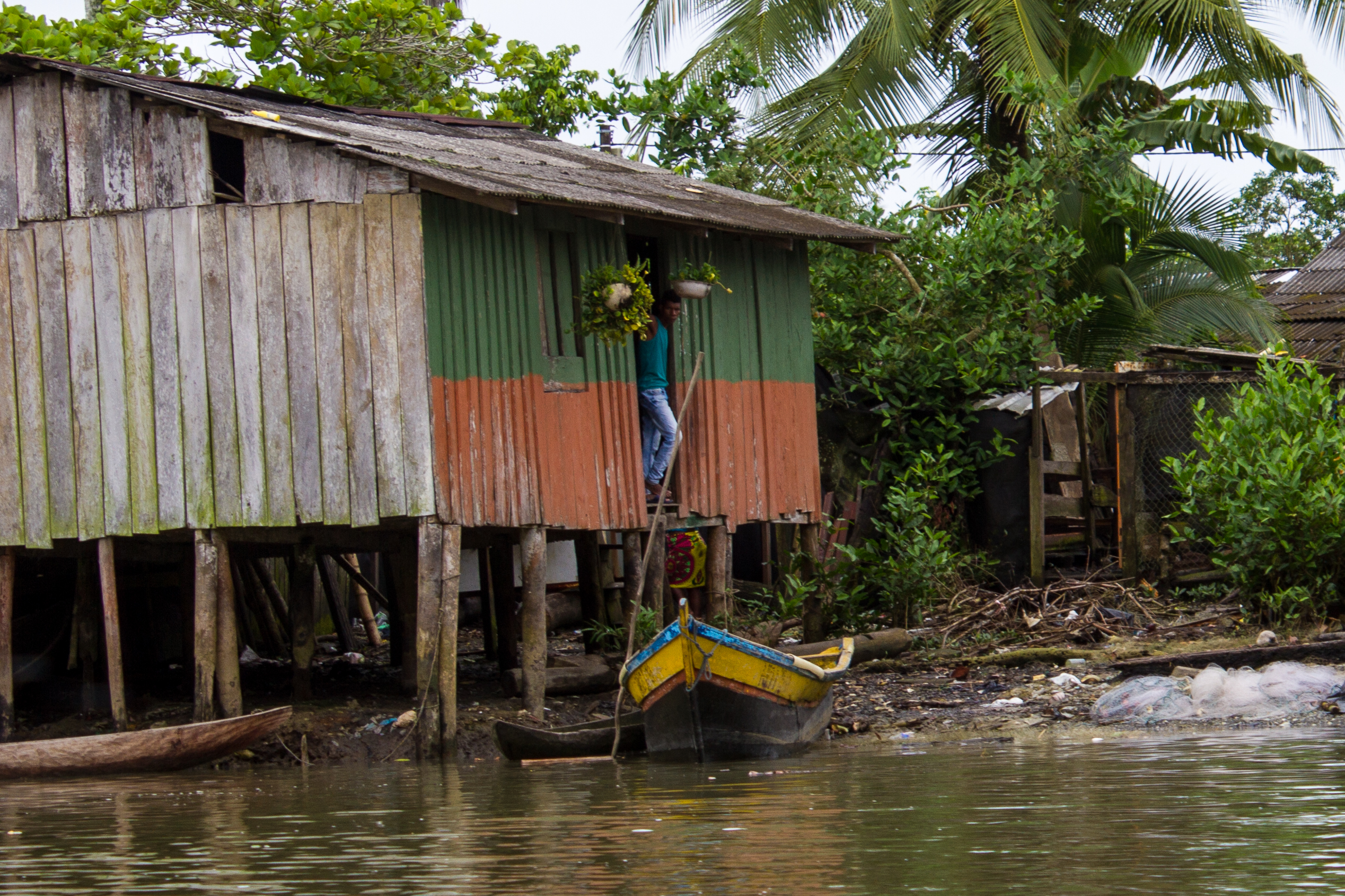
A building in the town of Nuqui in Chocó Department, Colombia - 2017

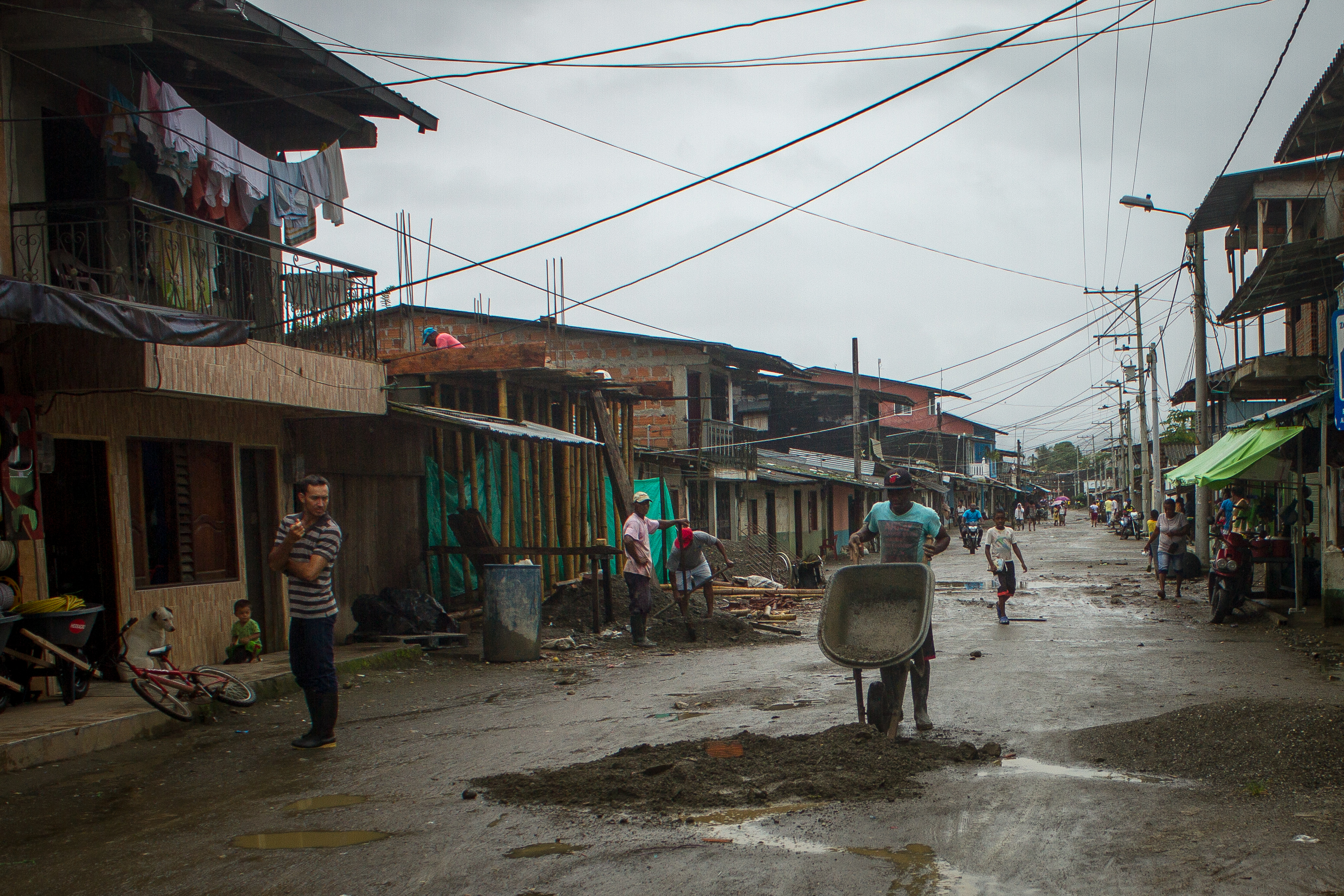
Main street in the town of Nuqui in Chocó Department, Colombia - 2017
