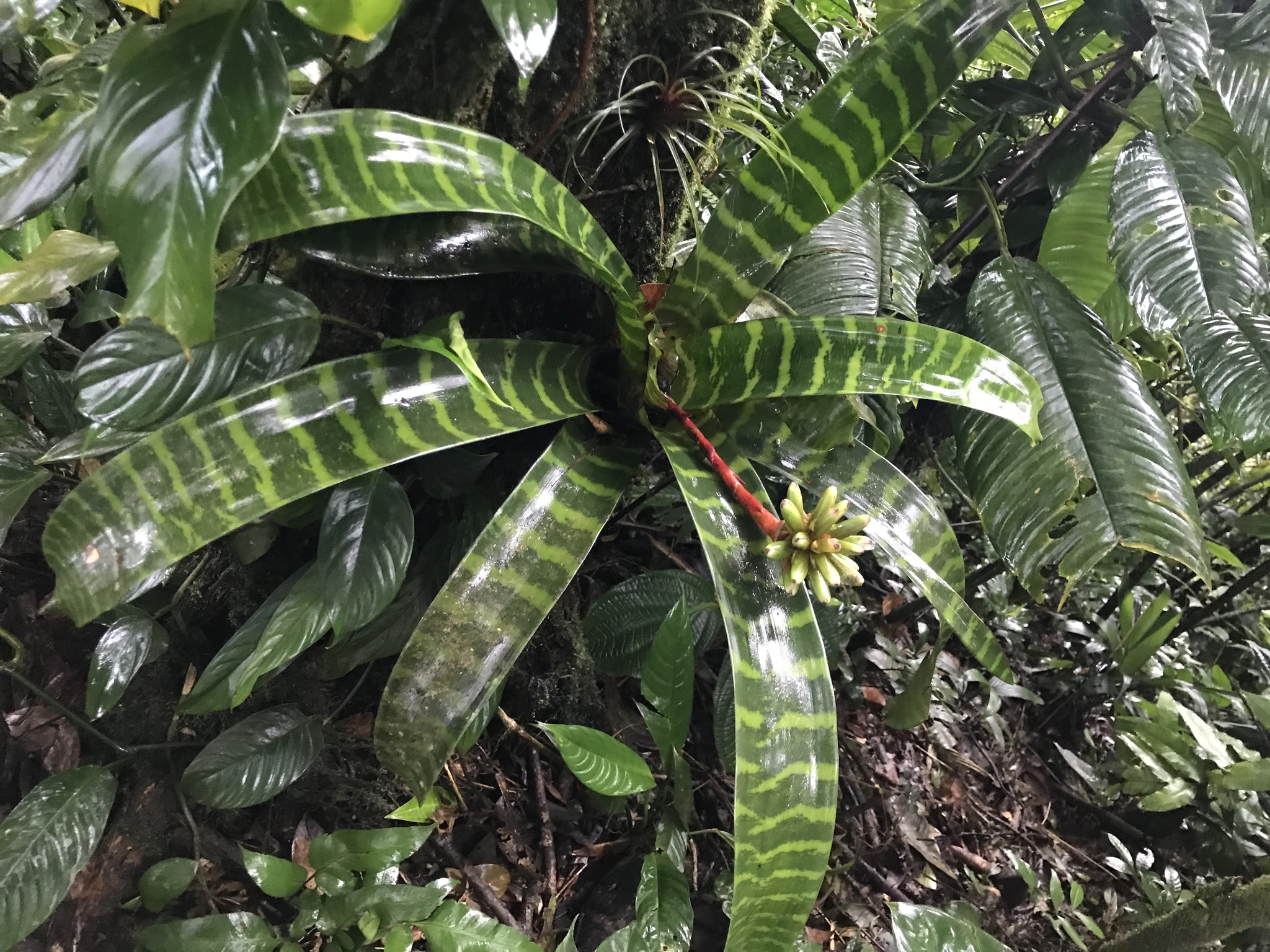

Scientific classification
- Kingdom: Plantae
- Clade: Embryophytes
- Clade: Tracheophytes
- Clade: Angiosperms
- Clade: Monocots
- Clade: Commelinids
- Order: Poales
- Family: Bromeliaceae
- Genus: Guzmania
- Species: G. musaica

Binomial name
- Guzmania musaica (Linden & André) Mez

Synonyms
- Tillandsia musaica Linden & André; Billbergia musaica (Linden & André) Regel; Caraguata musaica (Linden & André) Linden & André; Massangea musaica (Linden & André) E.Morren; Tillandsia mosaic Linden ex Rafarin; Guzmania musaica var. concolor L.B. Smith; Guzmania musaica var. discolor H. Luther; Guzmania musaica var. rosea H. Luther; Guzmania musaica var. zebrina Cutak

= Guzmania musaica =

Species of flowering plant

Guzmania musaica is a species of flowering plant in the family Bromeliaceae. This species is native to Costa Rica, Panama, Ecuador (Esmeraldas, Imbabura), Venezuela and Colombia (Antioquia, Choco, Narino, Norte de Santander, Valle del Cauca).

== Description ==
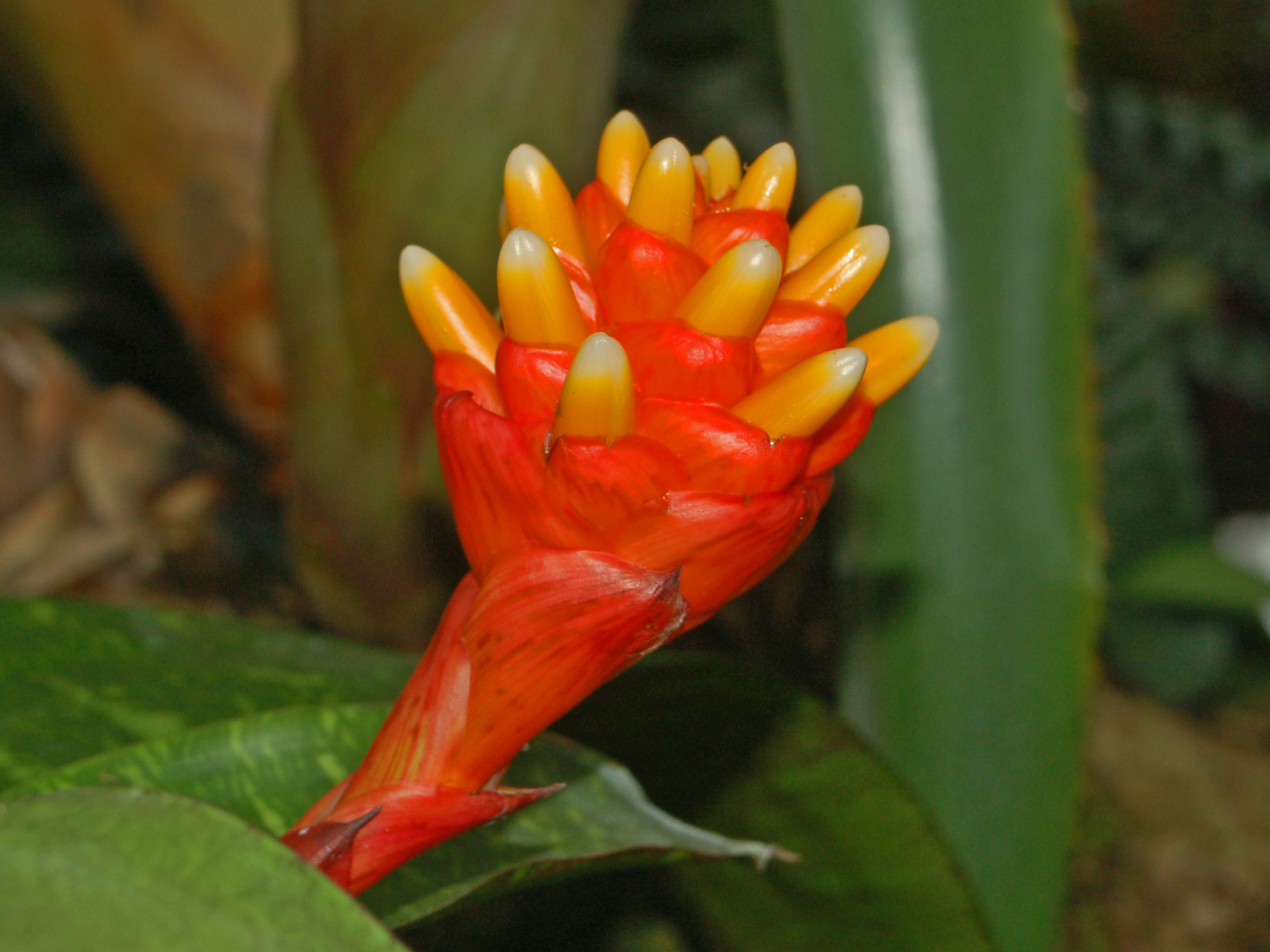
Inflorescence of Guzmania musaica

Guzmania musaica is a stemless, evergreen, epiphytic perennial plant that can reach a height of 20–40 centimetres (7.9–15.7 in). Leaves are about two feet long, simple, with entire margins, spineless, light green with reddish and dark green transverse striations. In the central rosette of leaves grows a long stem topped by a beautiful inflorescence of pink-red bracts with many waxy tubular yellow flowers arranged in spikes. The plant blooms from June to August. The fruits are septicidal capsules. After it has produced its fruits, the plant dies.

== Habitat ==
It grows as an epiphyte in rain forests.

== Cultivars ==
- Guzmania 'Golden King'
