= Sanquianga River =

River in Colombia

- Mouth location in Colombia
- Native name: Río Sanquianga (Spanish)

Location
- Country: Colombia

Physical characteristics
- Mouth
  - coordinates: 2°39′00″N 78°19′00″W

The Sanquianga River (Spanish: Río Sanquianga) is a river in the west of Colombia that flows into the Pacific Ocean.

== Course ==
The river flows through the Nariño Department.

== Climate ==
Temperatures average around 27 °C (81 °F). Annual rainfall is 3,000 to 4,000 millimetres (120 to 160 in). The most rain falls in June and July. November is the driest month.

== Delta ==
There is a large river delta at the mouth of the Sanquianga that feeds an area of Esmeraldes-Pacific Colombia mangroves with water relatively high in sediment. The mangrove trees have a canopy that reaches 40 to 50 metres (130 to 160 ft) in height. Sanquianga National Natural Park covers an area of the river delta which is periodically flooded by the action of the tides and rivers. It covers an area of 80,000 hectares (200,000 acres) in the municipalities of Mosquera, El Charco and Olaya Herrera. The Pacific tides carry the influence of the sea waters many kilometers into the interior of the low coastal plain.

== See also ==
- List of rivers of Colombia

== Sources ==
- Carlos Borda, Northern South America: Northern Colombia, WWF: World Wide Fund for Nature
- Río Sanquianga: Colombia, National Geospatial-Intelligence Agency
- "Sanquianga", www.colparques.net
