= Bahía Solano =

Coordinates: 6°13′N 77°24′W

- Municipality and town
- Flag

- Location of the municipality and town of Bahía Solano in the Choco Department of Colombia.
- Country: Colombia
- Department: Chocó Department
- Established: 2020-2023

Government
  - Mayor: Ulmer Mosquera Gutiérrez

Area
  - Municipality and town: 1,667 km^{2} (644 sq mi)
- Elevation: 173 m (568 ft)

Population
  - Urban: 9.400 (2,017)
- Afro-Colombians, Embera Indians, Paisas
- Time zone: UTC-5 (Colombia Standard Time)
- Website: www.bahiasolano-choco.gov.co

Bahía Solano is a municipality and town in the Chocó Department, Colombia. Bahia, as it is locally known, is an economic and tourist center of coastal Choco. The municipal head is Ciudad Mutis.

Bahia is home to José Celestino Mutis Airport as well as seaport, and along with daily flights to and from Medellin, Quibdo, Cali, and Bogota, there are bi-weekly ships that take passengers and cargo from Bahia to the port of Buenaventura. The region around Bahia Solano is home to scuba diving and sport fishing opportunities, providing a plethora of marine activities to the traveller. 18 km away from Bahia Solano is the beach town of El Valle, Choco, which is the closest community to the Ensenada de Utria National Park, located only 9 kilometres (5.6 mi) down the beach.

== Climate ==
Bahía Solano, like much of the Colombian pacific coast, experiences an extremely cloudy, rainy, oppressively hot and humid tropical rainforest climate (Af).

Climate data for Bahía Solano (Panamericana), elevation 4 m (13 ft)
| Month | Jan | Feb | Mar | Apr | May | Jun | Jul | Aug | Sep | Oct | Nov | Dec | Year |
|---|---|---|---|---|---|---|---|---|---|---|---|---|---|
| Mean daily maximum °C (°F) | 29.4 (84.9) | 29.9 (85.8) | 29.9 (85.8) | 29.9 (85.8) | 29.7 (85.5) | 29.3 (84.7) | 29.5 (85.1) | 29.5 (85.1) | 29.1 (84.4) | 28.8 (83.8) | 28.7 (83.7) | 29.0 (84.2) | 29.4 (84.9) |
| Daily mean °C (°F) | 26.0 (78.8) | 26.3 (79.3) | 26.2 (79.2) | 26.1 (79.0) | 25.9 (78.6) | 25.7 (78.3) | 25.8 (78.4) | 25.8 (78.4) | 25.6 (78.1) | 25.6 (78.1) | 25.5 (77.9) | 25.7 (78.3) | 25.8 (78.4) |
| Mean daily minimum °C (°F) | 22.5 (72.5) | 22.4 (72.3) | 22.4 (72.3) | 22.7 (72.9) | 22.7 (72.9) | 22.4 (72.3) | 22.3 (72.1) | 22.4 (72.3) | 22.2 (72.0) | 22.0 (71.6) | 22.0 (71.6) | 21.9 (71.4) | 22.3 (72.1) |
| Average precipitation mm (inches) | 267.4 (10.53) | 170.0 (6.69) | 213.8 (8.42) | 340.9 (13.42) | 499.1 (19.65) | 489.5 (19.27) | 517.8 (20.39) | 573.6 (22.58) | 548.5 (21.59) | 832.7 (32.78) | 746.1 (29.37) | 537.4 (21.16) | 5,736.8 (225.86) |
| Average precipitation days (≥ 1.0 mm) | 15.0 | 11.3 | 11.6 | 18.0 | 22.5 | 23.6 | 23.8 | 24.1 | 24.6 | 25.2 | 24.6 | 22.5 | 246.7 |
| Average relative humidity (%) | 89.5 | 88.6 | 89.3 | 89.6 | 90.8 | 91.0 | 90.6 | 91.0 | 91.4 | 91.7 | 92.4 | 91.5 | 90.6 |
| Mean monthly sunshine hours | 78.5 | 88.0 | 86.4 | 68.8 | 61.6 | 57.5 | 76.1 | 70.3 | 52.4 | 58.9 | 49.3 | 50.1 | 797.9 |
| Mean daily sunshine hours | 2.5 | 3.1 | 2.8 | 2.3 | 2.0 | 1.9 | 2.5 | 2.3 | 1.7 | 1.9 | 1.6 | 1.6 | 2.2 |
Source 1: Instituto de Hidrologia Meteorologia y Estudios Ambientales (temperatures and sunshine 1981-2010)
Source 2: Instituto de Hidrologia Meteorologia y Estudios Ambientales (precipitation 1991-2020)
