= Mompiche =

Town in Esmeraldas, Ecuador

Coordinates: 0°30′N 80°01′W

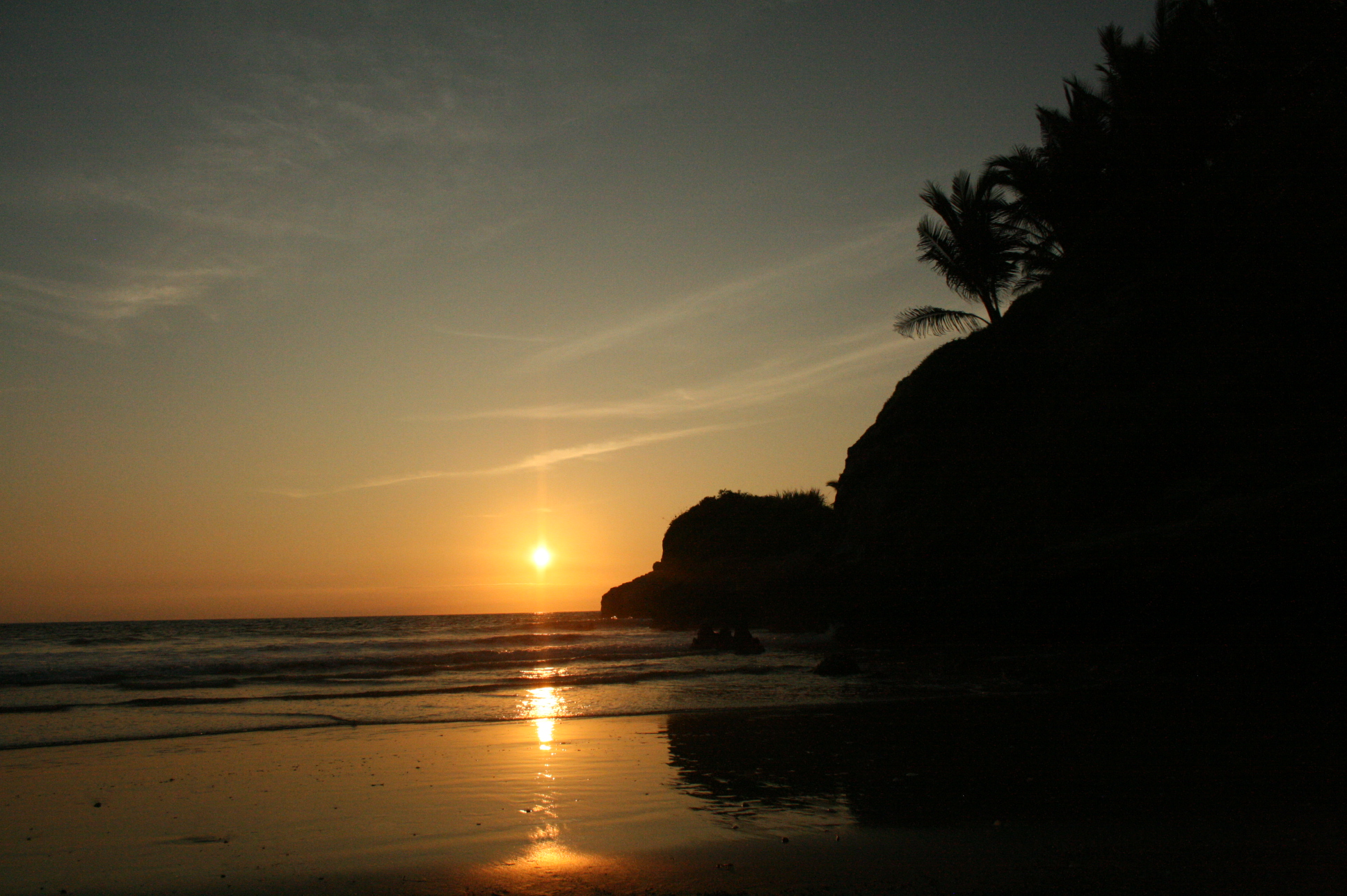
Sunset at Mompiche

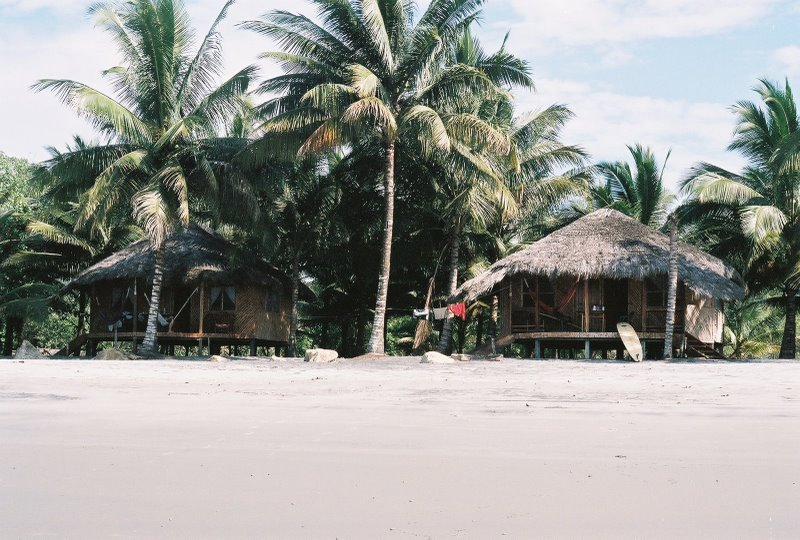
The hostel at the southernmost shore of the bay

Mompiche is a small beach town located on the coast of Ecuador in the province of Esmeraldas in South America.

== Geography ==
This town is located along the Pacific Ocean, in the northwestern part of Ecuador in the province of Esmeraldas. The city lies to the south of a large bay, which includes San Francisco at the northern end, Muisne, La Mancha in the center, and Mompiche in the south.

Its beaches extended approximately for 7 kilometers.

Near Mompiche are the small islands of Portete, Bolívar, and Las Manchas, also known as "Isla Bonita", which can be accessed by the sea in approximately 15 minutes. On the way to Portete, there is also El Ostional or Playa Negra, a particular beach characterized by the mineral composition of its sand is loaded with iron and titanium.

The area has a history dating back to the indigenous people who lived there before the arrival of the Spanish. Mompiche was a major center for trade and commerce for the indigenous Moche people, and evidence of their presence can still be seen in the form of petroglyphs and other artifacts that have been found in the area.

== History ==
=== Pre Columbian ===
Mompiche was a major center for trade and commerce for the Moche people and evidence of their presence can still be seen in the form of petroglyphs and other artifacts that have been found in the area.

=== 16th Century ===
When the Spanish arrived in the 16th century, they introduced Christianity and enslaved the indigenous population, forcing them to work in the mines and on the plantations. In the following centuries, the area experienced a great deal of economic and social changes, including the growth of fishing and agriculture, as well as the arrival of African slaves who were brought to work on the sugar and cacao plantations.

=== 21st Century ===
In 2017, the population of Mompiche expressed concern about the irregular extraction of these sands by mining companies.

In January 2021, a strong swell affected the town's boardwalk. The inhabitants of the place organized themselves to reinforce the breakwater wall of the same. The locals have demanded from the authorities "the construction of a breakwater and protection walls", without finding a response from them.

== Economy ==
The main economic activities of the town are artisanal fishing and tourism. The latter comes mostly from abroad.

The town lacks drinking water, which the public authorities supply through tanker trucks that supply water to its inhabitants.

== Mangroves ==
North of the province of Esmeraldas - Ecuador is the Cayapas-Mataje ecological reserve. It is characterized by its extensive mangrove forest, where the highest mangroves in the world rise. It has an area of 51,300 hectares. In the reserve, there are also guan dales forests, characterized by swampy areas with very unstable soils, in which there are cúngare, tangaré, sijo, Sande, and ánime trees.
