= Serranía del Baudó =

Mountain range in Colombia

- Location within Colombia

Highest point
- Peak: Alto de Buey
- Elevation: 1,810 m (5,940 ft)

Dimensions
- Length: 375 km (233 mi)

Geography
- Country: Colombia
- Region: Chocó
- Range coordinates: 06°12′00″N 77°12′00″W

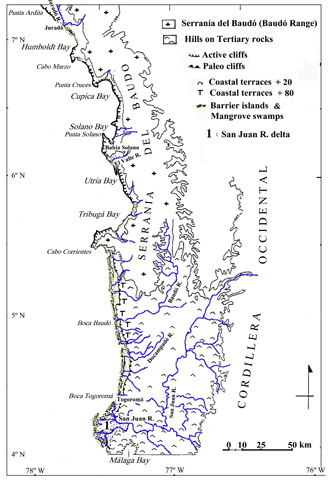

The Serranía del Baudó is a coastal mountain range on the Pacific coast of Colombia. It is separated from the West Andes by the Atrato valley where the Atrato River flows and Quibdó is located. From the south the range extends from the Baudó River north and slightly west along the coast into Panama terminating at the Golfo de San Miguel. The range is called Serranía del Sapo when it is in Panama. Technically the landform extends south of the Baudó River down to Malaga Bay, but the area has been eroded into low hills and marshlands.

From Cabo Corrientes north to Punta Ardita and on into Panama the Baudó Mountains meet the ocean in steep cliffs, rising up to as high as 70 m (230 ft), with small indentations in the coast providing small pocket beaches, some sandy, but most are shingle or cobble. However, near river mouths the coast has been eroded and there are wide sandy beaches, tidal flats and even mangrove swamps.

The highest point, Alto de Buey, is 1,810 m (5,940 ft).

== Geology ==
Geologically, the Serranía del Baudó represents an extension of the Isthmus of Panama. The mountain range started forming in the Late Cretaceous and Paleocene from oceanic volcanics that were compacted as the Nazca Plate and later Malpelo Plate pushed eastward into and under the South American Plate. The area is still tectonically active with the Malpelo Plate estimated to move eastward at the rate of 3.7 centimetres (1.5 in) per year.

== Wildlife ==
Alto de Buey poison frog, Andinobates altobueyensis, is only known from the Alto del Buey mountain.
