= Utría National Natural Park =

Colombian national park

- Parque Nacional Natural Utría
- IUCN category II (national park)
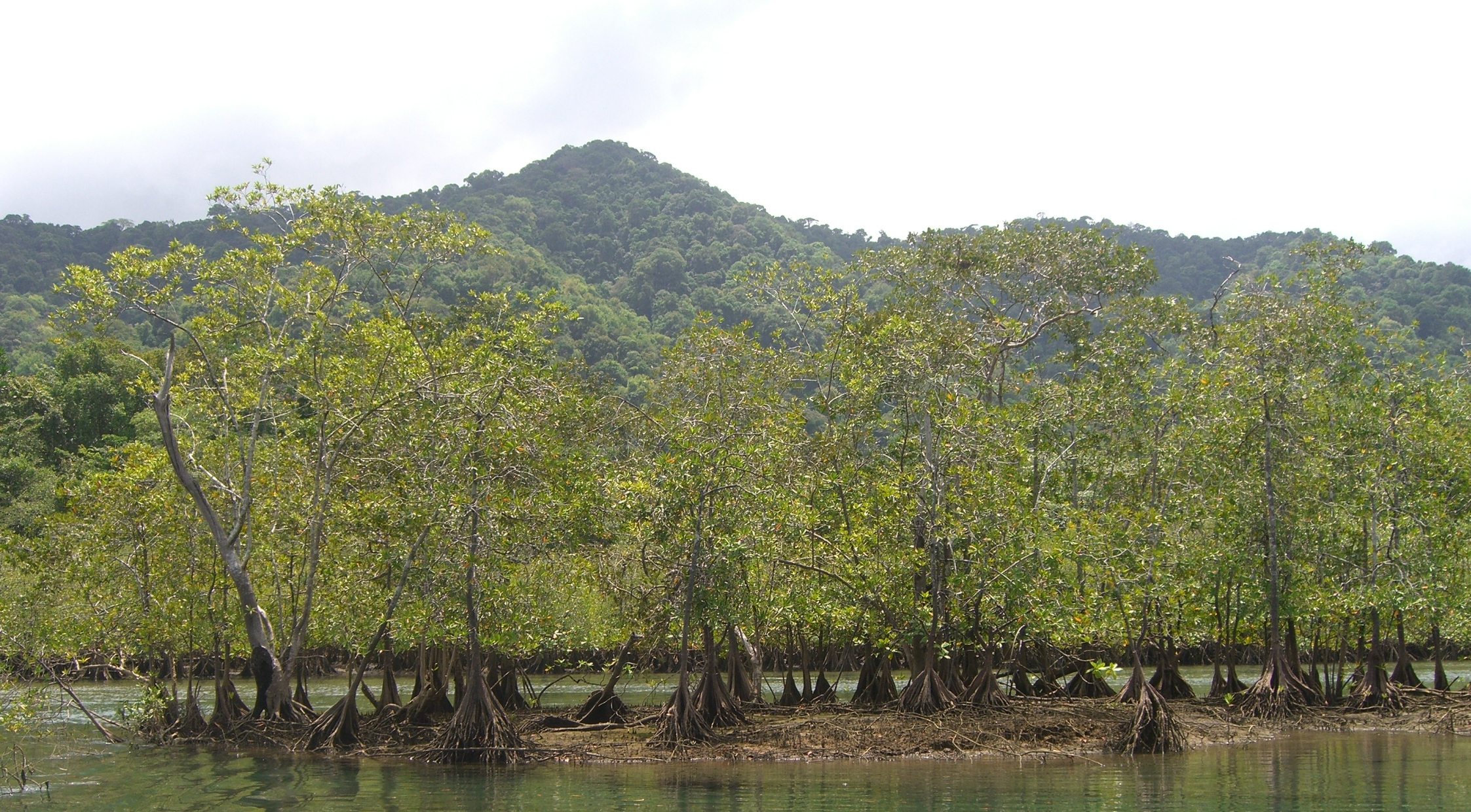
- Mangroves along the shore of the park

- Location within Colombia
- Location: Chocó Department, Colombia
- Nearest city: Tribugá
- Coordinates: 6°00′11″N 77°14′31″W
- Area: 54,300 ha (210 sq mi)
- Designation: National park
- Created: October 1987
- Administrator: SINAP

The Utría National Natural Park (Spanish: Parque Nacional Natural Ensenada de Utría) is a national park in the Chocó Department, Colombia. It contains diverse flora and fauna in a lush, mountainous rainforest environment with some of the highest rainfall in the world, at up to 10,000 millimetres (390 in) annually. The park also protects the coastal marine environment, and is known for visits by humpback whales, who give birth in the lagoon after which the park is named, and sea turtles who nest on the beaches. There is accommodation for visitors, and ecotourism services are provided by the local indigenous people and members of the coastal Afro-Colombian communities.

== Location ==
The Utría National Natural Park is on the Pacific coast of Colombia in the Chocó Department. It covers parts of the municipalities of Bahía Solano, Nuquí, Bojayá and Alto Baudó. The park overlaps the territory of the Emberá indigenous people, who have well-preserved cultural traditions. There are also fishing villages of Afro-Colombian people along the coast. Both groups are strongly oriented towards conservation of the environment.

The park is north of the Gulf of Tribugá. It is named for the Ensenada de Utría (Utría Cove), a huge seawater lagoon at the northwest entrance of the park surrounded by grey beaches and mangroves. The park was created in 1987. It has an area of 54,380 hectares (134,400 acres) including the protected marine and land areas. Elevations range from 0 to 1,400 metres (0 to 4,593 ft) above sea level. The park covers part of the Baudó mountains. The Condoto, Condotico and Valle rivers and the Mundúquera stream originate in the park.

The climate is warm and humid, with mean temperatures from 23 to 30 °C (73 to 86 °F). The average annual temperature at sea level is 28 °C (82 °F). The park is in a region of Chocó that is one of the wettest areas of the world, with rainfall of up to 10,000 millimetres (390 in) annually. There is rain on over 300 days each year, with most rain in October and least rain in February.

== Marine environment ==
There are coral reefs along the shore that contain 11 of the 16 species of coral recorded in the Pacific region, including branched corals of the Pocillopora and Porites genera, Psammocora stellata, three species of the genus Pavona and Gardineroseris planulata. About 81 species of mollusks have been reported, including Eastern Pacific giant conch (Lobatus galeatus) and ark clams of the genus Anadara which provide food to the local communities. There are over 180 species of fish ranging from tiny goby fish to the huge whale shark (Rhincodon typus).

Sea turtles come to the beaches in nesting season. The olive ridley sea turtle (Lepidochelys olivacea) is the most common turtle nesting on the Cuevita beach, and there are sporadic records of other turtles such as leatherback sea turtle (Dermochelys coriacea), hawksbill sea turtle (Eretmochelys imbricata) and green sea turtle (Chelonia mydas). Common bottlenose dolphin (Tursiops truncatus) and oceanic dolphins of the genus Stenella are present year round. Occasional visitors include sperm whale (Physeter macrocephalus), killer whale (Orcinus orca) and Risso's dolphin (Grampus griseus). Humpback whales (Megaptera novaeangliae) visit from June to November. They use Utría Cove to give birth from August to October.

== Forest environment ==
Trees in the park include timber species as cohíba, the symbol of the Chocó Department, níspero, comino, abarco, ceiba, carbonero, guayacán, caracolí (used for building coastal boats) and oquendo (used by the black and indigenous communities for making crafts). There are also palms such as chontaduro and mil pesos that are important sources of food for the local populations, and iraca which is used to make crafts. There are various medicinal plants, and seven of the ten species of mangroves found on the Colombian Pacific coast.

Fauna in the forest include jaguar (Panthera onca), cougar (Puma concolor), brocket deer (genus Mazama), white-lipped peccary (Tayassu pecari), collared peccary (Pecari tajacu), mantled howler (Alouatta palliata), black-headed spider monkey (Ateles fusciceps), giant anteater (Myrmecophaga tridactyla), brown-throated sloth (Bradypus variegatus), lowland paca (Cuniculus paca) and Central American agouti (Dasyprocta punctata). There are many reptiles and amphibians. There are about 380 species of birds in all strata of the forest, a very high level of diversity.

== Visiting ==
The park is open to the public. It may be reached by a flight from Medellín to Bahía Solano or Nuquí. From Bahía Solano there is a road to the village of El Valle, and then a walk to the park through humid tropical forest that takes about three hours. The park may also be reached by boat from Buenaventura to Bahía Solano, Nuquí or El Valle, a trip that takes about 26 hours. From there to the park by boat takes 30 to 50 minutes. The park has an information center, a restaurant and cabins at the Jaibaná visitor center that can accommodate 31 people.

The Corporación Mano Cambiada, a non-profit community organization, provides ecotourism services. There are several trails through the park of low to moderate difficulty. The park has magnificent beaches, and visitors may swim, snorkel or scuba dive. Visitors must carry identification and medical insurance, and must have been vaccinated for tetanus and yellow fever at least ten days before visiting the park. Consumption of alcohol is prohibited. Visitors must not bring pets, carry firearms, make noise that would disturb the environment, make fires or use aerosols or contaminants such as non-biodegradable soaps, and must remove solid waste they have generated when leaving the park.

== Sources ==
- "Golfo de Tribugá", Nuqui Ekari (in Spanish), 2013, archived from the original on 2016-10-30
- Parque Nacional Natural Utría (in Spanish), PNNC: Parques Nacionales Naturales de Colombia, archived from the original on 2017-06-29
- Utría (in Spanish), colparques.net
