= Chocó–Darién moist forests =

Ecoregion in Colombia and Panama

Chocó–Darién moist forests (NT0115)
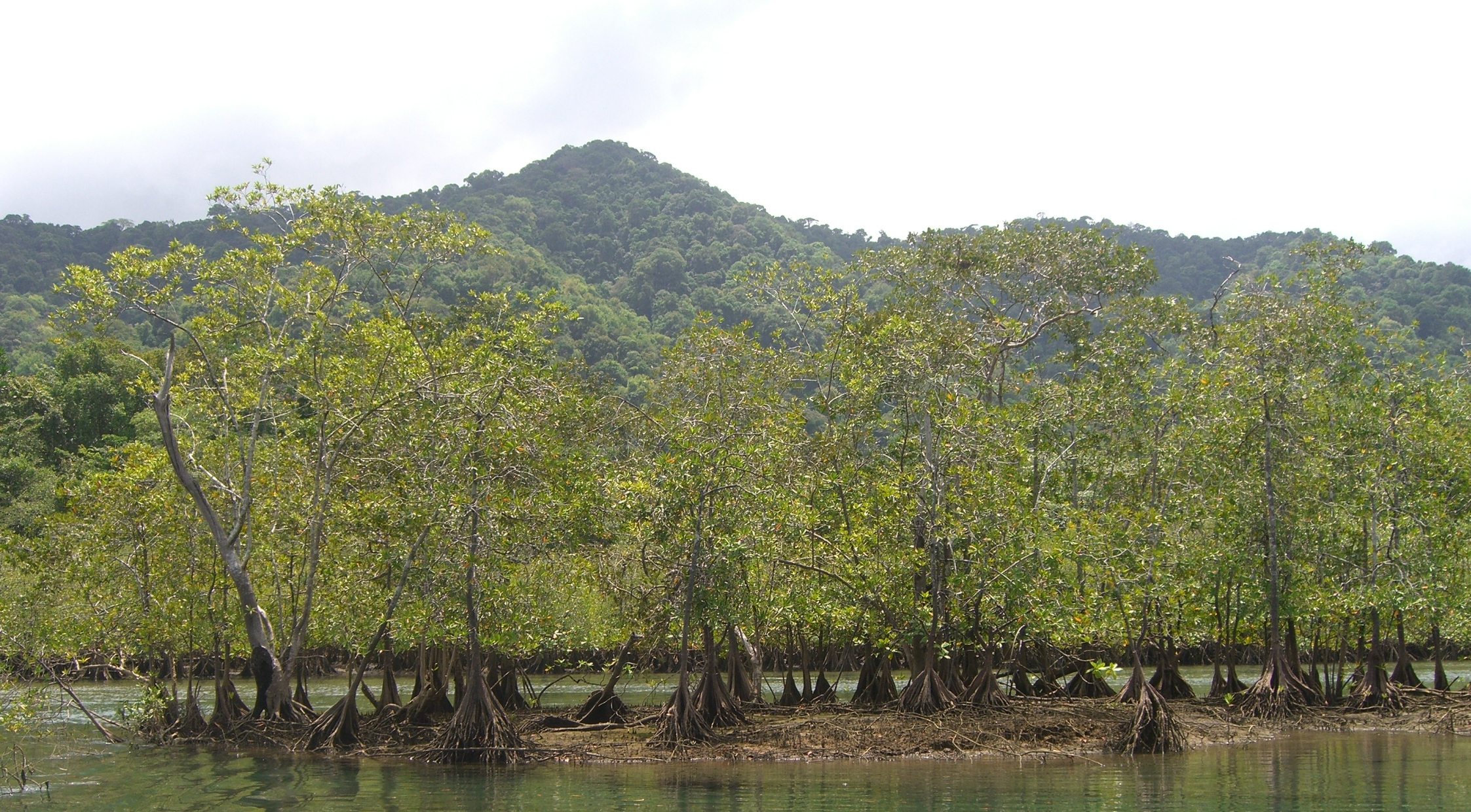
- Mangroves fringing the Utría National Natural Park

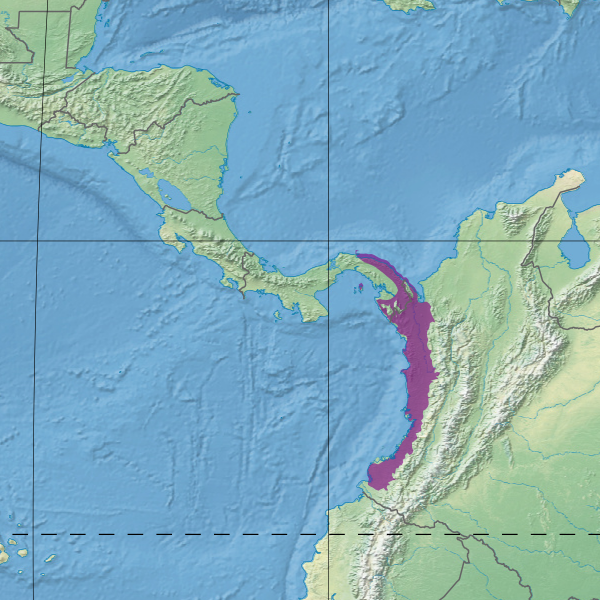
- Ecoregion territory (in purple)

Ecology
- Realm: Neotropical
- Biome: Tropical and subtropical moist broadleaf forests
- Borders: List: Eastern Panamanian montane forests; Esmeraldas–Pacific Colombia mangroves; Gulf of Panama mangroves; Isthmian–Atlantic moist forests; Magdalena–Santa Marta mangroves; Magdalena–Urabá moist forests; Northwest Andean montane forests; Patía Valley dry forests; Western Ecuador moist forests
- Bird species: 577

Geography
- Area: 73,556 km^{2} (28,400 mi^{2})
- Countries: Colombia, Panama
- Coordinates: 6.32°N 76.845°W
- Geology: Chocó and Tumaco Basins
- Climate type: Af: equatorial; fully humid

Conservation
- Conservation status: Relatively stable/intact
- Protected: 15.26%

The Chocó–Darién moist forests (NT0115) is a largely forested tropical ecoregion of northwestern South America and southern Central America. The ecoregion extends from the eastern Panamanian province of Darién and the indigenous region of Guna Yala to almost the entirety of Colombia's Pacific coast, including most of the Chocó Department and the lowlands of Valle del Cauca, Cauca and Nariño Departments.

This largely untouched, inaccessible expanse of jungle receives some of the planet's highest rates of precipitation, with the average rainfall measuring anywhere from 4,000 to 9,000 millimetres or 13 to 30 feet per year. High humidity and daily average temperatures of around 23.9 °C (75 °F) lead to a huge wealth of plant, animal and fungal biodiversity. Many of the dominant tree species within the north of the ecoregion belong to such genera as the bongo (Cavanillesia), wild cashew (Anacardium), rubber trees (Havea) and kapok fiber trees (Ceiba). In more wet, flooded areas, the cativo (Prioria copaifera)—a hardwood tree in the legume family, Fabaceae—is common. Numerous epiphytic lianas (vines and crawlers) belonging to the family Araceae use these trees for support systems (such as Anthurium, Monstera and Philodendron). Growing along the sheltered forest floor are unique and varied species of plant families like Marantaceae, Piperaceae, Orchidaceae and Bromeliaceae, as well as many ferns, jungle cacti, mosses and lichens, among others.

However, while most of the forest is relatively intact, many of its human inhabitants endure some of the highest levels of poverty within Colombia and Panamá, respectively. With such a difficult environment to access, and with relatively few options to climb the socioeconomic "ladder", certain areas of the forest have been significantly altered for ranching and agriculture, and the land is continuously being threatened by the prospects of oil, logging and paper pulp industries.

== Geography ==
=== Location ===
The Chocó–Darién moist forest extends along most of the Pacific west coast of Colombia and northeastward, into Panamá and the infamous Darién Gap, before reaching the Caribbean coast of Colombia. The forests are bounded to the east by the Andes, which separates them from the Amazon and Orinoco basin eco-regions of Brazil, Venezuela and eastern Colombia. The forests have an area of 7,355,566 hectares (18,176,000 acres).

The northern section merges into Isthmian–Atlantic moist forests to the west in the Isthmus of Panama, and surrounds patches of higher-elevation Eastern Panamanian montane forest. Along the Caribbean coast there is a stretch of Amazon–Orinoco–Southern Caribbean mangroves. To the east it adjoins the Magdalena–Urabá moist forests near the Caribbean coast, and then adjoins the Northwestern Andean montane forests ecoregion along the Andes to the east. On the Pacific coast there are stretches of South American Pacific mangroves. In the southeast an arm of the Patía Valley dry forests reaches down to the ecoregion. In the extreme south the ecoregion merges into the Western Ecuador moist forests ecoregion.

=== Terrain ===
The ecoregion is between the Pacific Ocean and the Western Ranges of the Andes, with elevations from sea level to about 1,000 metres (3,300 ft). It includes the western slopes of the Andes and the Cerro Torrá, Serranía del Darién, Sierra Llorona de San Blas and Serranía del Baudó massifs. Terrain includes recently formed alluvial plains, hills formed in the Tertiary and Pleistocene from dissection of sediments, and older Mesozoic era rocks in the mountains. The soils are typically red clay laterite, leached of most nutrients by the heavy rain. Younger and more fertile soils are found along the Andes and in the main river floodplains.

Subregions include the hilly region of Darién and Urabá in the north; the Pacific coastal zone with elevations up to about 500 metres (1,600 ft); the central strip; the hills of the El Carmen de Atrato and San José del Palmar municipalities; and the rainforest along the western Andes up to an elevation of about 1,000 metres (3,300 ft). The ecoregion contains the basin of the Atrato River in the north, and further south the basins of the Baudó, San Juan, San Juan de Micay and Patía rivers. The heavy rainfall gives these rivers great power, cutting deep gorges through the mountains with dramatic falls and rapids in the upper reaches. Lower down the rivers broaden out and meander through the plains.

=== Climate ===
Annual temperatures average 23.6 °C (74.5 °F), ranging from a minimum of 18.6 °C (65.5 °F) to a maximum of 30 °C (86 °F). Annual rainfall is from 4,000 to 9,000 millimetres (160 to 350 in). The central region receives the most rain, in some areas as high as 13,000 millimetres (510 in), while the north and south are comparatively drier. The extreme north has a distinctly drier season from January to March, whilst the extreme south has a drier season from August to November. At a sample location at coordinates 5.75°N 77.25°W the Köppen climate classification is Af: equatorial; fully humid. Mean temperatures range from 24.8 °C (76.6 °F) in October–November to 25.8 °C (78.4 °F) in April. Annual rainfall is about 6,500 millimetres (260 in). Monthly rainfall ranges from 347.6 millimetres (13.69 in) in March to 654.1 millimetres (25.75 in) in October.

== Ecology ==
The ecoregion is in the Neotropical realm, in the tropical and subtropical moist broadleaf forests biome. The rainforests are some of the richest in the world. The ecoregion is part of the Tumbes–Chocó–Magdalena biodiversity hotspot.

=== Flora ===
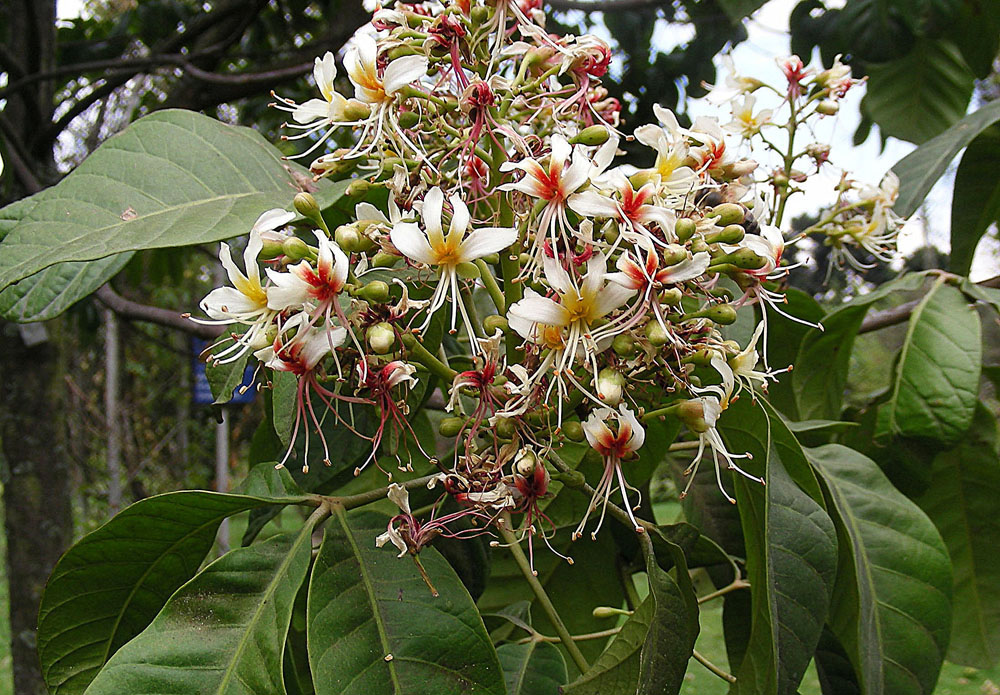
Cariseco (Billia colombiana)

There are at least 8,000 vascular plant species in the ecoregion, perhaps over 10,000 of which (almost 20%) are found nowhere else. The mix of flora depends on elevation, water levels and the influence of the sea. Many species are locally endemic, found only in small regions, so there is considerable diversity from one area to another. There are no endemic families, but several endemic genera. Some genera, such as Trianaeopiper and Cremosperma, have many species.

Generally the lowland rain forests in the north hold trees associated with cow tree (Brosimum utile), with groves of bongo (Cavanillesia platanifolia), wild cashew (Anacardium excelsum), Panama rubber (Castilla elastica), snakewood or bastard breadnut (Brosimum guianense), Bombacopsis species, kapok tree (Ceiba pentandra) and tonka bean (Dipteryx oleifera). There are large emergent trees that rise above the canopy. The understory is rich in Mabea occidentalis and Clidemia, Conostegia and Miconia species. Periodically flooded areas are often rich in cativo (Prioria copaifera). The southern part of the rain forest has two strata of trees, and large emergent trees, with flourishing lianas and epiphytes. The central zone has rain forests at higher elevations and wet or very wet forests lower down. Vegetation includes formations that would otherwise be found only in cloud forests, with thick moss and other types of non-vascular epiphytes on the tree trunks and branches, and with diverse species of woody hemiepiphyte lianas of the Ericaceae, Marcgraviaceae and Melastomataceae families. There are many slender trees.

In the north and south near the coast, where there is a dry season, there are greater numbers of deciduous plants.

Above an elevation of 600 metres (2,000 ft) common species include Inga species, cariseco (Billia colombiana), Brosimum species, Sorocea species, Jacaranda hesperia, Pourouma bicolor, Guatteria ferruginea, Cecropia species, Elaegia utilis and Brunellia species.

=== Fauna ===
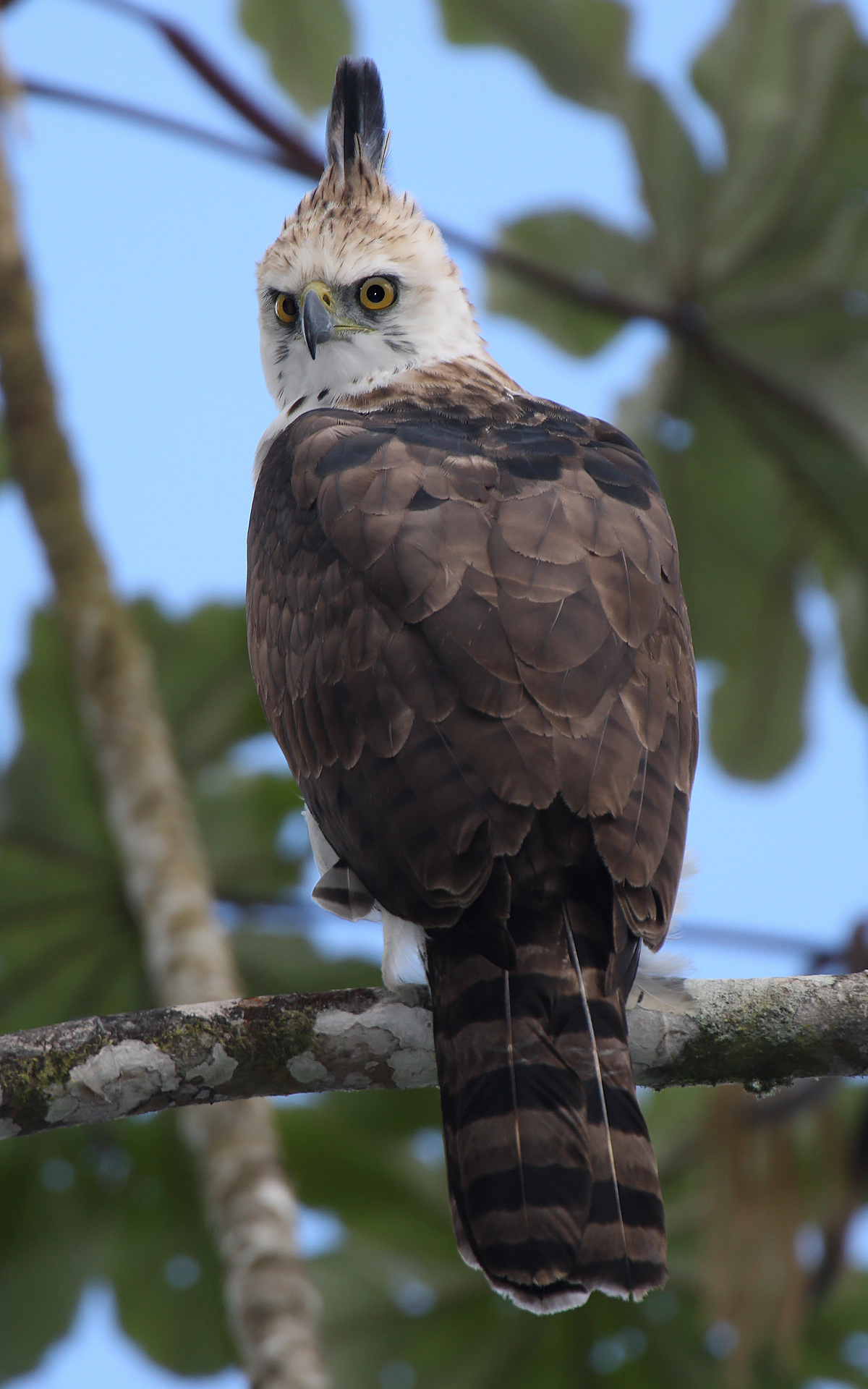
Immature Ornate hawk-eagle in the Darién National Park

There is high diversity of fauna in the Chocó–Darién moist forests ecoregion, and many endemic species. The extremely high rainfall makes it difficult for many vertebrates to travel, forming gap in the distribution of several primates and other mammals. Vulnerable or endangered mammal species include Geoffroy's tamarin (Saguinus geoffroyi), giant anteater (Myrmecophaga tridactyla), cougar (Puma concolor), ocelot (Leopardus pardalis) and jaguar (Panthera onca). Other endangered mammals include black-headed spider monkey (Ateles fusciceps), Geoffroy's spider monkey (Ateles geoffroyi), Gorgas's rice rat (Oryzomys gorgasi) and Baird's tapir (Tapirus bairdii).

577 species of birds have been recorded. The most diverse family is tyrant flycatcher (Tyrannidae) with 28 genera and 60 species. The ecoregion is a center of bird endemism, with at least 60 species with restricted ranges. These include the Choco tinamou (Crypturellus kerriae), Baudó oropendola (Psarocolius cassini), viridian dacnis (Dacnis viguieri), crested ant tanager (Habia cristata), Lita woodpecker (Piculus litae) and plumbeous forest falcon (Micrastur plumbeus). Other rare birds include the harpy eagle (Harpia harpyja), black-and-white hawk-eagle (Spizaetus melanoleucus), and perhaps the speckled antshrike (Xenornis setifrons), although this last may no longer be present in Colombia. Endangered birds also include great green macaw (Ara ambiguus), rufous-brown solitaire (Cichlopsis leucogenys), banded ground cuckoo (Neomorphus radiolosus), Baudo guan (Penelope ortoni) and Baudó oropendola (Psarocolius cassini).

There are records of 97 reptile species, including 35 from the family Colubridae and 26 from the family Iguanidae. Endangered reptiles include Dunn's spinytail lizard (Morunasaurus groi) and Boulenger's least gecko (Sphaerodactylus scapularis). There are at least 127 amphibian species. Endangered amphibians include the elegant stubfoot toad (Atelopus elegans), El Tambo stubfoot toad (Atelopus longibrachius), Lynch's stubfoot toad (Atelopus lynchi), Costa Rican variable harlequin toad (Atelopus varius), horned marsupial frog (Gastrotheca cornuta), lemur leaf frog (Hylomantis lemur), Lehmann's poison frog (Oophaga lehmanni), golden poison frog (Phyllobates terribilis) and Myers' Surinam toad (Pipa myersi).

Endangered insects include the titan beetle (Titanus giganteus).

== Status ==
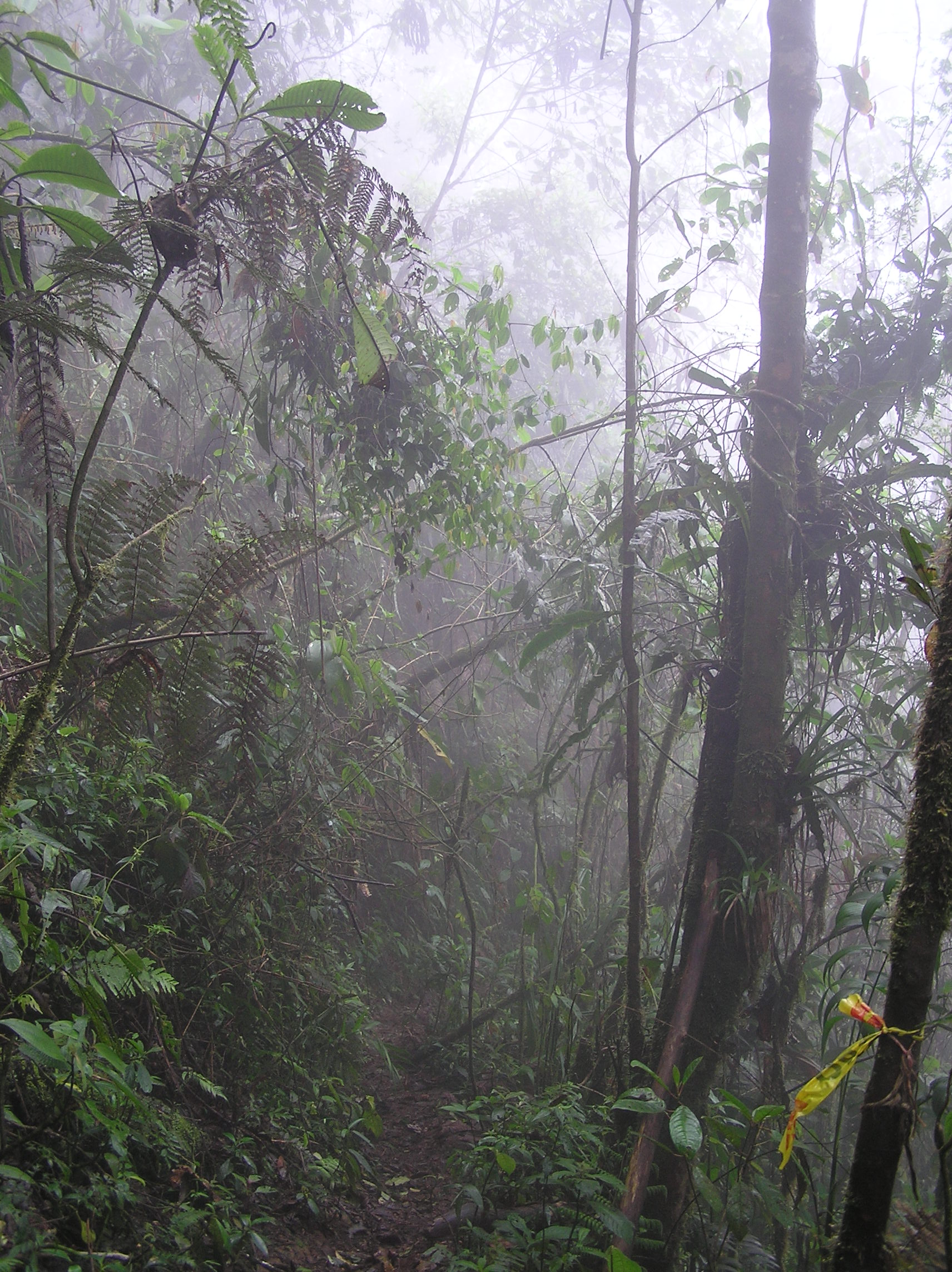
Farallones de Cali rain forest

The World Wide Fund for Nature (WWF) gives the region the status of "Relatively Stable/Intact". The northern parts in Colombia have mostly been replaced by banana plantations and cattle ranches. The southern areas have been partly replaced by oil palm plantations, and are being deforested for paper pulp. Most of the intact forest is in the central area. However, the remaining blocks of habitat in 1995 were large, intact and well-connected. There is high potential for research and ecotourism. Some areas of secondary forest may be almost 500 years old, suitable for research into tropical forest regeneration.

As of 1995 10% to 20% of the original habitat had been destroyed, with one source at the time claiming 3.5% was being altered each year. The Chocó forests supply half of Colombia's wood, and the main threat comes from deforestation and resultant erosion. As of 1990 about 600 square kilometres (230 sq mi) was being deforested annually. The Inter-American Highway in the Darien region is causing degradation of the habitat. Industrial development is a threat. The naval base at the entry to Málaga Bay may disrupt humpback whale reproduction. Other threats come from plantations of African oil palm (Elaeis guineensis), gold mining and coca growing.

About 30% of the 13,335 square kilometres (5,149 sq mi) of the ecoregion in Panama is protected to some extent. The 597,000 hectares (1,480,000 acres) Darién National Park is also a UNESCO World Heritage Site. Other areas with some protection in Panama include the 3,200 square kilometres (1,200 sq mi) Kuna-Yala indigenous reserve and the 4,326 square kilometres (1,670 sq mi) Embera Wounan reserve. Other parts of the ecoregion in Panama have been set aside as mining reserves or are used for agriculture.

In Colombia, as of 1997 about 2,013 square kilometres (777 sq mi) was protected by widely separated national parks, covering 2.5% of the ecoregion and 1% of the original habitat. These include the 720 square kilometres (280 sq mi) Los Katíos National Park, which borders the Darien National Park of Panama, the 543 square kilometres (210 sq mi) Ensenada de Utria National Park, with land and marine sectors, the 800 square kilometres (310 sq mi) Sanquianga National Natural Park and the 16 square kilometres (6.2 sq mi) Gorgona Island National Park. Parts of the ecoregion are also protected by the lower parts of the Farallones de Cali National Park and Munchique National Natural Park. Another large park in the area is Paramillo National Natural Park.
