= Leigri Nature Reserve =

Protected area in Estonia

- Location within Estonia
- Location: Estonia
- Nearest city: Kärdla
- Coordinates: 58°53′37″N 22°34′47″E
- Area: 458 ha (1,130 acres)

Leigri Nature Reserve is a nature reserve situated in western Estonia, on Hiiumaa island.

The nature reserve consists of an area of wetlands and forest. Protected plant species that can be found in the nature reserve includes sweet gale, fir clubmoss and butterfly orchid. It also functions as breeding ground for common crane.
