= Butterfly orchid =

Butterfly orchid is a common name for several orchids and may refer to:

- Psychopsis, any species
- Platanthera, any species
- Sarcochilus, several species
- Anacamptis papilionacea (formerly in Orchis)
- Encyclia tampensis
- Habenaria psycodes
- Platanthera chlorantha (the greater butterfly orchid of Europe)
- Platanthera bifolia (the lesser butterfly orchid of Europe)
- Polyrrhiza lindenii
- Phalaenopsis aphrodite
