= Mariposa orchid =

Mariposa orchid, literally "butterfly" orchid in Spanish, can refer to:

- Phalaenopsis amabilis, also called the "moon orchid" or "moth orchid", a species of orchid native to the Philippines, Indonesia, and Malaysia

- Phalaenopsis, moth orchids in general

- Psychopsis 'Mariposa', a hybrid orchid from South America
