= Magdalena–Urabá moist forests =

Ecoregion in Northern Colombia

Magdalena–Urabá moist forests (NT0137)
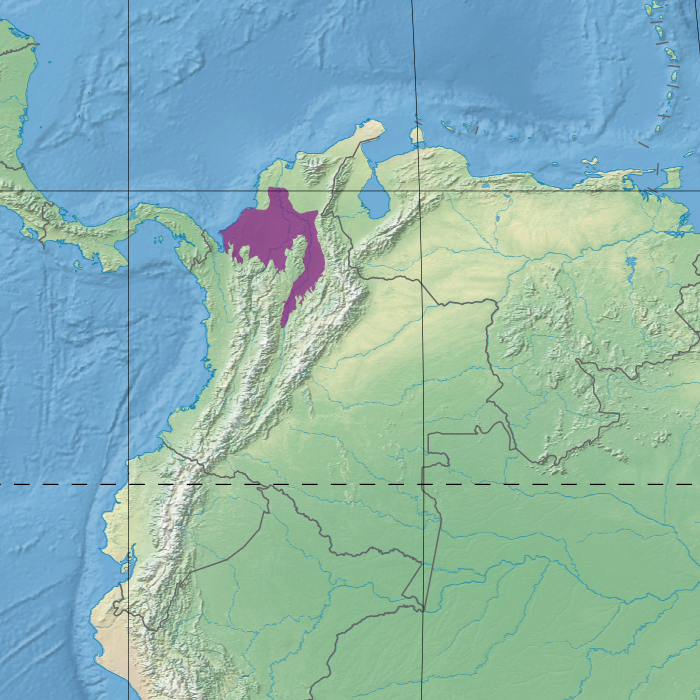
- Ecoregion territory (in purple)

Ecology
- Realm: Neotropical
- Biome: Tropical and subtropical moist broadleaf forests

Geography
- Area: 76,923 km^{2} (29,700 sq mi)
- Countries: Colombia
- Coordinates: 8.298°N 75.150°W
- Geology: Middle, Lower Magdalena Valley, Sinú-San Jacinto Basin
- Rivers: Magdalena, Cauca, Nechí, San Jorge, Sinú, Atrato
- Climate type: Am: equatorial, monsoonal

The Magdalena–Urabá moist forests (NT0137) is an ecoregion in the north of Colombia. The terrain is largely flat or undulating, but includes mountainous areas in the south. It contains moist forests and large wetlands that are important to resident and migratory birds. The ecoregion forms a bridge between the Pacific coast ecoregions of Colombia and Central America, and the ecoregions of the Andes and Amazon. It is surrounded by the more populated parts of Colombia and is threatened by farming, ranching, logging, oil exploitation and water pollution in the main rivers.

== Geography ==
=== Location ===
The ecoregion is in the north of Colombia, with an area of 7,692,264 hectares (19,008,000 acres). It includes the flat landscape along the lower course of the Magdalena River, and extends west over the coastal plain to the Gulf of Urabá. To the north the ecoregion transitions into the Sinú Valley dry forests and Guajira–Barranquilla xeric scrub ecoregions. To the west it meets the Chocó–Darién moist forests, and to the south merges into the Northwestern Andean montane forests, Cauca Valley montane forests and Magdalena Valley montane forests. The ecoregion transitions into the Magdalena Valley dry forests in the extreme south.

=== Terrain ===
The Eastern Ranges and Central Ranges bound the eastern part of the ecoregion, and the Western Ranges borders the western part, which extends to the Gulf of Urabá and the Chocó Department. A series of ranges run along the southern part of the region, the Serranía de Abibe, Serranía de San Jerónimo, Serranía de Ayapel and Serranía de San Lucas, which rises to over 2,600 metres (8,500 ft) above sea level. Other than these ranges and some isolated mountains, the terrain is undulating. The center of the region is flat.

The main river in the ecoregion is the Magdalena River. Other important rivers include the lower Cauca, Nechí, San Jorge, Sinú and Atrato. In the center of the ecoregion the rivers form the ciénagas (wetlands), a large system of marshes, lakes and ponds, of great importance to resident and migratory birds.

=== Climate ===
The ecoregion has a seasonal climate, with dry periods in January–March, when strong winds carry clouds from the Caribbean to the southern serranías, and in July–August. There is more rainfall around the Serranía de San Lucas, in the center of the region, and in the upper valleys of the Sinú, San Jorge and Nechí rivers. Mean annual rainfall in the lower areas is 3,000 millimetres (120 in). As much as 4,000 millimetres (160 in) may fall in the upper river valleys and canyons.

At a sample location at coordinates 8.25°N 74.75°W the Köppen climate classification is "Am": equatorial, monsoonal. The mean temperature ranges from 27.1 °C (80.8 °F) in October to 28.8 °C (83.8 °F) in March. Yearly total rainfall is about 3,000 millimetres (120 in). Monthly rainfall is under 30 millimetres (1.2 in) in January and February, rising to 396.9 millimetres (15.63 in) in August.

== Ecology ==
The ecoregion is in the Neotropical realm, in the tropical and subtropical moist broadleaf forests biome. The Magdalena–Urabá moist forests ecoregion links the Central American and Chocó ecoregions with the ecoregions of the Andes and the Amazon basin. It has high diversity of species and a high level of endemism. The ecoregion is sometimes seen as the eastern part of the Chocó, but it has different characteristics and different endemic species.

=== Flora ===
In the flooded areas vegetation is palmettos and wetland flora. In the drier areas the vegetation is dense, high rainforest with a rich understory, with great diversity of flora. Large trees include Anacardium excelsum, Cariniana pyriformis, Caryocar amygdaliferum, Caryocar glabrum, Cedrela odorata, Ceiba pentandra, Cordia gerascanthus, Hymenaea courbaril, Myroxylon balsamum, Ochroma lagopus, Schizolobium parahyba and Tabebuia rosea. The forest contains large vines that support creepers, Araceae and Bromeliaceae. There are more than 150 species of orchid, including Cattleya warscewiczii, Cycnoches chlorochilon, Peristeria elata and Psychopsis papilio. Endemic flora include Heliconia laxa, Heliconia lentiginosa, Heliconia rigida and Heliconia sanctae-theresae.

=== Fauna ===
Large mammals found in the rain forests or wetlands include Geoffroy's spider monkey (Ateles geoffroyi), cotton-top tamarin (Saguinus oedipus), white-footed tamarin (Saguinus leucopus), jaguar (Panthera onca), cougar (Puma concolor), ocelot (Leopardus pardalis), jaguarundi (Puma yagouaroundi), crab-eating raccoon (Procyon cancrivorus), giant anteater (Myrmecophaga tridactyla), South American tapir (Tapirus terrestris colombianus), red brocket (Mazama americana), gray brocket (Mazama gouazoubira), capybara (Hydrochoerus hydrochaeris) and West Indian manatee (Trichechus manatus). Endangered mammals include black-headed spider monkey (Ateles fusciceps), Geoffroy's spider monkey (Ateles geoffroyi), red-crested tree-rat (Santamartamys rufodorsalis), white-footed tamarin (Saguinus leucopus) and cotton-top tamarin (Saguinus oedipus).

The ecoregion is a wintering place or feeding place for many species of birds. It provides the main winter habitat for species such as northern pintail (Anas acuta), American wigeon (Anas americana), northern shoveler (Anas clypeata), cinnamon teal (Anas cyanoptera), blue-winged teal (Anas discors), and osprey (Pandion haliaetus). Native species include great green macaw (Ara ambiguus), military macaw (Ara militaris), blue-and-yellow macaw (Ara ararauna), scarlet macaw (Ara macao), red-and-green macaw (Ara chloroptera) chestnut-fronted macaw (Ara severus), northern screamer (Chauna chavaria), Muscovy duck (Cairina moschata), knob-billed duck (Sarkidiornis melanotos), black-bellied whistling duck (Dendrocygna autumnalis), white-faced whistling duck (Dendrocygna viduata), fulvous whistling duck (Dendrocygna bicolor), black hawk-eagle (Spizaetus tyrannus), crested eagle (Morphnus guianensis), harpy eagle (Harpia harpyja) and blue-billed curassow (Crax alberti). Endangered birds include the recurve-billed bushbird (Clytoctantes alixii) and blue-billed curassow (Crax alberti).

The ecoregion is home to reptiles such as American crocodile (Crocodylus acutus), spectacled caiman (Caiman crocodilus), Magdalena River turtle (Podocnemis lewyana), red-footed tortoise (Chelonoidis carbonaria), bushmaster (Lachesis muta), boa constrictor (Boa constrictor), green iguana (Iguana iguana) and gold tegu ( Tupinambis teguixin). Endangered reptiles include Dahl's toad-headed turtle (Mesoclemmys dahli). Endangered amphibians include the frog Sachatamia punctulata. The wetlands provide a nursery for a variety of freshwater and salt water fish species.

== Status ==
The World Wide Fund for Nature gives the ecoregion the status of "Critical/Endangered". It is surrounded by most of the population of Colombia. Pressures come from large-scale farming, ranching, gold mining, oil wells and logging. It has suffered from warfare related to illegal narcotics. The largest rivers, the Magdalena and Cauca, are highly polluted. However, there are sizeable areas where there has been little human impact, the largest being the area round the Serranía de San Lucas. Several internationally-funded projects are trying to save important wetlands in the region.
