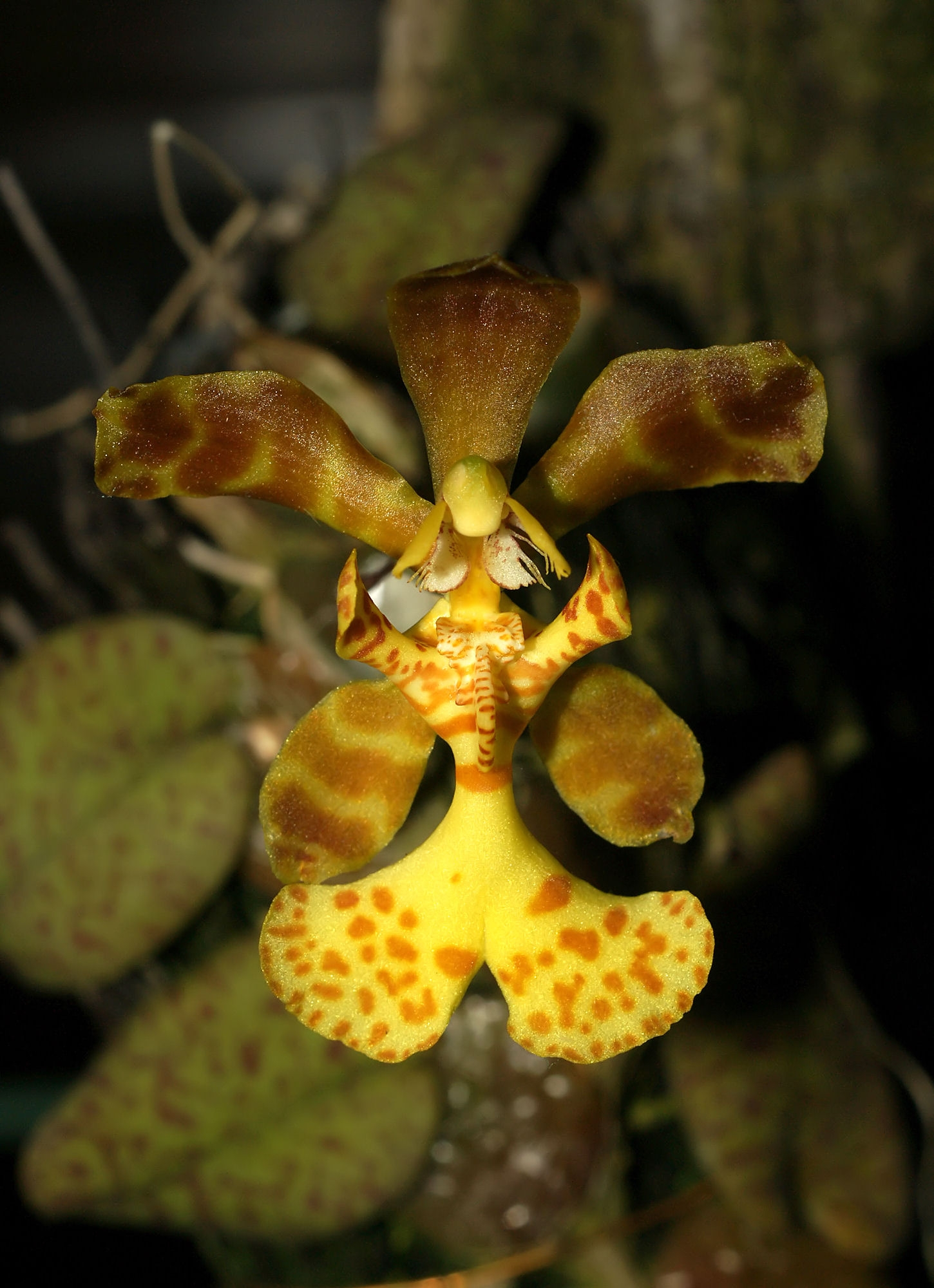

Scientific classification
- Kingdom: Plantae
- Clade: Tracheophytes
- Clade: Angiosperms
- Clade: Monocots
- Order: Asparagales
- Family: Orchidaceae
- Subfamily: Epidendroideae
- Tribe: Cymbidieae
- Subtribe: Oncidiinae
- Genus: Psychopsiella; Lückel & Braem
- Species: P. limminghei

Binomial name
- Psychopsiella limminghei (E.Morren ex Lindl.) Lücke & Braem

Synonyms
- Oncidium echinophorum Barb.Rodr.; Oncidium limminghei E.Morren ex Lindl; Psychopsis limminghei (E.Morren ex Lindl) M.W.Chase

= Psychopsiella =

Species of plant

Psychopsiella is a monotypic genus in the orchid family found only in the state of Rio de Janeiro in Brazil and near Caracas in Venezuela. It grows as an epiphyte in evergreen montane forests at elevations of 800 to 1,500 metres (2,600 to 4,900 ft).

== Description ==
Psychopsiella limminghei is an epiphytic herb with a short rhizome, usually of a length within 3 cm (1.2 in) between pseudobulbs. It has a creeping habit of growth, with both pseudobulbs and leaves pressed against the substrate. Its pseudobulbs, 2.0 cm (0.79 in) long and 1.5–2.0 cm (0.59–0.79 in) wide, are elliptic, flattened, and irregularly ribbed, often with one or two bracts. Each pseudobulb carries one ovate-elliptic leaf 2.0–3.5 cm (0.79–1.4 in) long and wide. Leaves are pale green, splotched with maroon, with a rough surface and asymmetric base. The inflorescence emerges erect from the base of the pseudobulb, usually carrying one flower at a time; up to four additional flowers can be produced successively. Flowers are comparatively large and can be up to 5 cm (2.0 in) across. The sepals are obovate-spathulate, 1.0–2.0 cm (0.39–0.79 in) long and 0.6–0.8 cm (0.24–0.31 in) wide, and the tips are apiculate; the dorsal sepal is sometimes cupped. The petals are oblong, with a length of 1.2–1.8 cm (0.47–0.71 in) and a width of 0.6–1.0 cm (0.24–0.39 in), and may be truncate or apiculate. Regarding structure, the lip is strongly tri-lobed, 1.8–2.5 cm (0.71–0.98 in) long and wide. The side lobes are oblong, curving up with a narrow waist, and middle lobe is much larger than the side lobes, with a distinct narrow isthmus. The callus is lobulate, with three ridges running down the lip. These ridges are apparently covered with oil, and the middle ridge is higher and longer than the others. A pair of lacerate wings on the erect column is centered on the stigmatic cavity, and the anther cap almost completely protects the pollinia. In terms of color, the sepals and petals are similar, covered almost completely with red-brown splotches or barring. The side-lobes and lip show more of the base yellow hue, covered in small orange-brown spots. The lip callus is minutely dotted with dark red, and the anther shows no spotting.

== Taxonomy and naming ==
Psychopsiella limminghei was first formally described in 1855 by John Lindley from a specimen reportedly collected in Venezuela by the Dutch consul in Caracas, R. van Lansberg, who sent it to Edward Morren in England, who himself passed the type plant to Lindley. The description was published in Folia Orchidacea. It is suspected that a mistake was made about the origin of the material near Caracas and that the true range of the species is limited to Brazil. P. limminghei was first described in Oncidium and later assigned to section Glanduligera, but after DNA sequencing showed that Oncidium was largely polyphyletic, sect. Glanduligera was elevated to the genus Psychopsis. Later, Lücke and Braem transferred P. limminghei to its own genus based on its similar but smaller leaf and flower structure.

== Pollination ==
As the former sectional name of P. limminghei implies, the species carries large glands on the lip callus and base of the column, which may be involved in oil secretion. Several genera of bees (e.g. Centris) collect oil and mix it with pollen; this is then fed to their larvae.

== Cultivation ==
Because of its creeping rhizome and pseudobulbs, as well as leaves that are flattened against the substrate, this species should be mounted on a piece of wood or a branch; pot culture is difficult or nearly impossible, as the growths will quickly extend out of the pot. If grown on a mount, humidity must be high and the plants need to be watered at least once a day in the summer. Sphagnum moss may be wrapped around the roots to hold moisture. During extremely hot, dry weather, mounted plants may need several mistings each day. If not mounted, plants may grow in shallow pots or baskets filled with an open, fast-draining medium. The roots must dry rapidly after watering, so it is essential that the medium has perfect drainage. Repotting or dividing should be performed only near the beginning of the growth season when new roots are starting to develop, allowing the plant to become established in the shortest possible time with the least amount of stress.

During the summer, P. limminghei should have intermediate to warm conditions (not higher than 30 °C (86 °F) in the daytime and down to 14 °C (57 °F) at night); 70% or higher humidity is desirable. Cultivated plants should be watered often while actively growing, but drainage should be excellent and conditions around the roots should never be stale or soggy. During the winter months, water should be slightly reduced. Fertilizer should be applied weekly at half- or quarter-strength when plants are actively growing. Some prefer to use a balanced fertilizer throughout the year, but others use a high-nitrogen fertilizer from spring through mid-summer, then switch to one with high phosphate content in late summer and autumn. As mentioned earlier, P. limminghei has a moderate rest period during the winter, with temperatures averaging highs of 21 °C (70 °F) and lows of 15 °C (59 °F). Though watering may be lowered, plants should not be dry for more than a week, especially if they are mounted. Fertilizer should be reduced or eliminated until heavier watering is resumed in the spring.
