= Frank Chapman (ornithologist) =

American ornithologist (1864–1945)

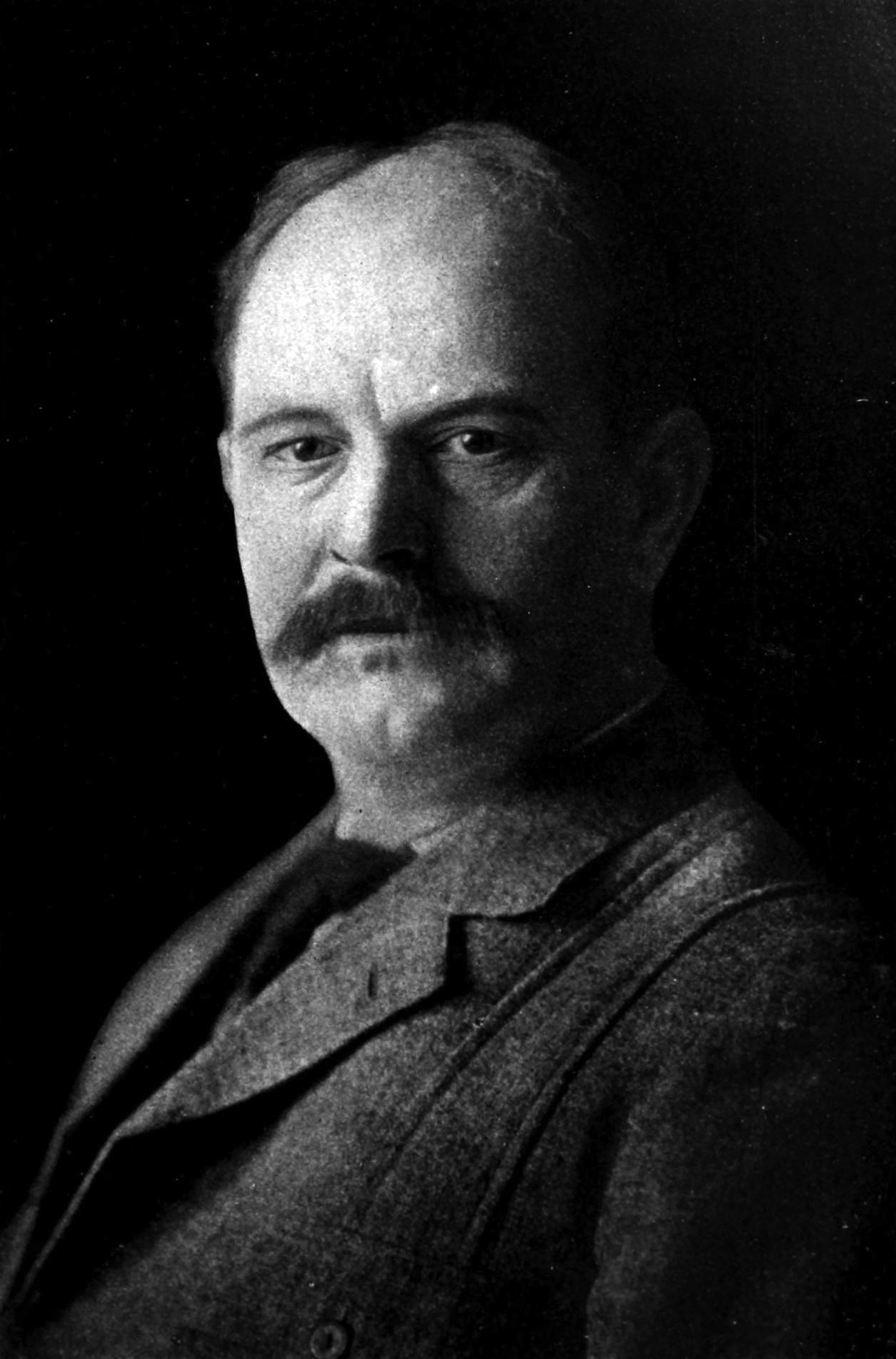
- Born: Frank Michler Chapman; June 12, 1864; West Englewood, New Jersey, US
- Died: November 15, 1945 (aged 81); New York City, US
- Known for: Audubon Christmas Bird Count
- Awards: Daniel Giraud Elliot Medal (1917); John Burroughs Medal (1929)
- Scientific career
- Fields: Ornithology
- Workplaces: American Museum of Natural History
- Author abbrev. (zoology): Chapman

Signature
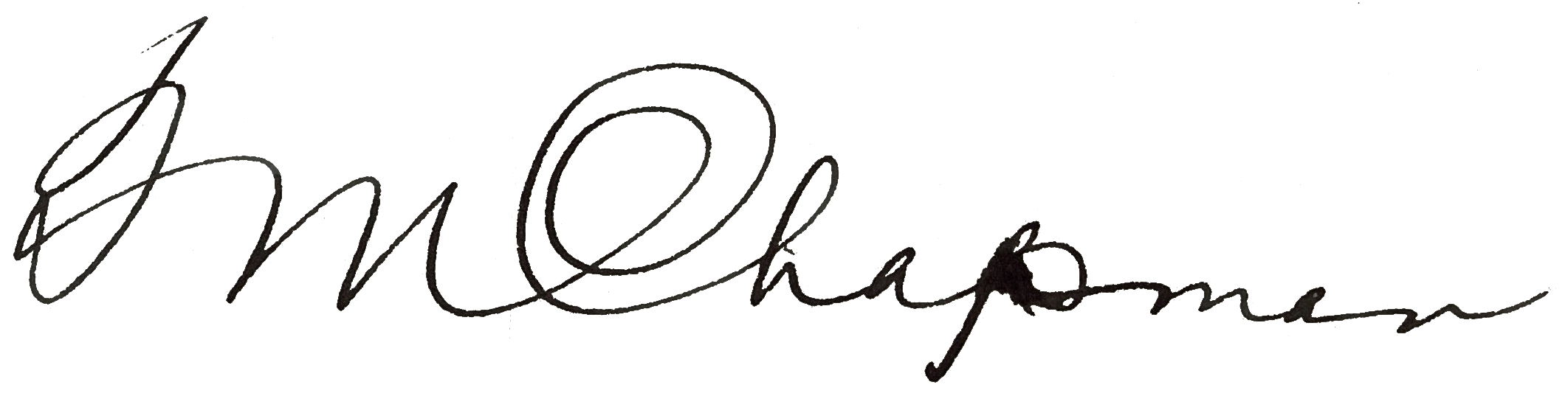

Frank Michler Chapman (June 12, 1864 – November 15, 1945) was an American ornithologist and pioneering writer of field guides.

== Biography ==
Chapman was born in the West Englewood section of present-day Teaneck, New Jersey, and attended Englewood Academy. He joined the staff of the American Museum of Natural History in 1888 as assistant to Joel Asaph Allen. In 1901 he was made associate Curator of Mammals and Birds and in 1908 Curator of Birds.

Chapman came up with the original idea for the Audubon Christmas Bird Count. He also wrote many ornithological books such as, Bird Life, Birds of Eastern North America, and Life in an Air Castle. Chapman promoted the integration of photography into ornithology, especially in his book Bird Studies With a Camera, in which he discussed the practicability of the photographic blind and in 1901 invented his own more portable version of a blind using an umbrella with a large 'skirt' to conceal the photographer that could be bundled into a small pack for transport along with the other, at the time very bulky, paraphernalia of the camera gear. For his work, Distribution of Bird-life in Colombia, he was awarded the Daniel Giraud Elliot Medal from the National Academy of Sciences in 1917. He was elected to both the National Academy of Sciences and the American Philosophical Society in 1921.

In the winter seasons, starting from his mother's home in Gainesville, Florida, he made numerous field trips to collect small mammals and birds; thus he went to various localities in Florida, Texas, Cuba, Trinidad, B. W. I., Yucatan and Vera Cruz, Mexico, and later to many countries in South America. The story of his local expeditions in the United States and of his one visit to England is told in his Camps and Cruises of an Ornithologist (1908) and much later his many expeditions to Mexico, Central and South America are dealt with in his all too brief, authentic Autobiography of a Bird Lover (1933).

Chapman fathered one child, Frank Chapman, Jr., who first married playwright Elizabeth Cobb and had a daughter, actress and TV personality Buff Cobb. He later divorced Cobb and married mezzo-soprano opera singer Gladys Swarthout.

Chapman was interred at Brookside Cemetery.

== The Legacy of Distribution of Bird-life in Colombia ==
Published in 1917, Distribution of Bird-life in Colombia collated data and records from Chapman and the American Museum of Natural History’s eight ornithological expeditions into Colombia. These expeditions, like others in the 1910s, emphasized the collection of avian specimens as the predominant form of data collection. Chapman and his team from the American Museum of Natural History collected 15, 775 avian specimens from their expeditions, along with 1,600 mammal specimens.

Later ornithological expeditions in the 1950s would expand their methods of data collection to include observational data, in addition to specimen collection. A resurgence of interest in Colombian aviary biodiversity, fueled by concerns of deforestation and changes in climates, led to more surveys in the 1990s and 2010s. These resurveys of the San Antonio mountain ranges further changed their methodology to favor observational data, citizen observational data, and mist netting.

The Colombia Resurvey Project is a collective of researchers who began reproducing Frank Chapman’s original expeditions in 2020. The goals of this project according to its website is “to document the current status and past changes of bird assemblages and their habitats throughout the country, and to establish a quantitative, publicly-available database for future assessments and monitoring”. The surveys carried out in this project have expanded upon the methodology of studies from the 2010s, incorporating citizen training and citizen-led data collection. Additional modifications to the project’s resurveys included decolonial practices such as emphasizing and crediting local contributors and sharing information gained from the studies to support long term conservation efforts in the study’s vicinity. Another all-women expedition led by members of the Resurvey project occurred in 2020. This project was reportedly inspired by the team member's rediscovery of Elizabeth Kerr's contributions to Chapman's and the American Museum of Natural History’s collections. Letters between Kerr and Chapman owned by the American Museum of Natural History suggest that Elizabeth Kerr was the first women to partake in ornithological expeditions in Colombia, and made significant specimen contributions to the museum's collections. These specimen were often identified by Chapman himself, and in some instances included newly identified species. One such species, the Choco tinamou (Crypturellus kerriae), was named in her honor by Chapman.

== Publications ==
As well as numerous papers in scientific journals and magazines such as the National Geographic Magazine, books and major reports authored by Chapman include:

- (1894). Visitors' Guide to the Local Collection of Birds in the American Museum of Natural History.
- (1895). Handbook of Birds of Eastern North America.
- (1897). Bird-Life: A Guide to the Study of Our Common Birds.
- (1898). Four-Footed Americans and Their Kin. (by Mabel Osgood Wright, with Frank Chapman as editor and Ernest Seton Thompson as illustrator)
- (1899). Descriptions of five apparently new birds from Venezuela. Bull. of the American Museum of Natural History 12 ( 9): 153-156
- (1900). Bird Studies with a Camera.
- (1901). The Revision of the Genus Capromys.
- (1903). Color Key to North American Birds; (1912) revised edition
- (1903). The Economic Value of Birds to the State.
- (1907). Warblers of North America.
- (1908). Camps and Cruises of an Ornithologist.
- (1910). The Birds of the Vicinity of New York City: A guide to the Local Collection.
- (1915). The Travels of Birds.
- (1917). The Distribution of Bird-life in Colombia.
- (1919). Our Winter Birds.
- (1920). What Bird is That?.
- (1921). The Habit Groups of North American Birds.
- (1921). The Distribution of Bird Life in the Urubamba Valley of Peru. A report of the birds collected by the Yale University - National Geographic Society's expedition.
- (1926). The Distribution of Bird-life in Ecuador.
- (1929). My Tropical Air Castle.
- (1931). The Upper Zonal Bird-Life of Mts Roraima and Duida.
- (1933). The Autobiography of a Bird-Lover.
- (1938). Life in an Air Castle: Nature Studies in the Tropics.
