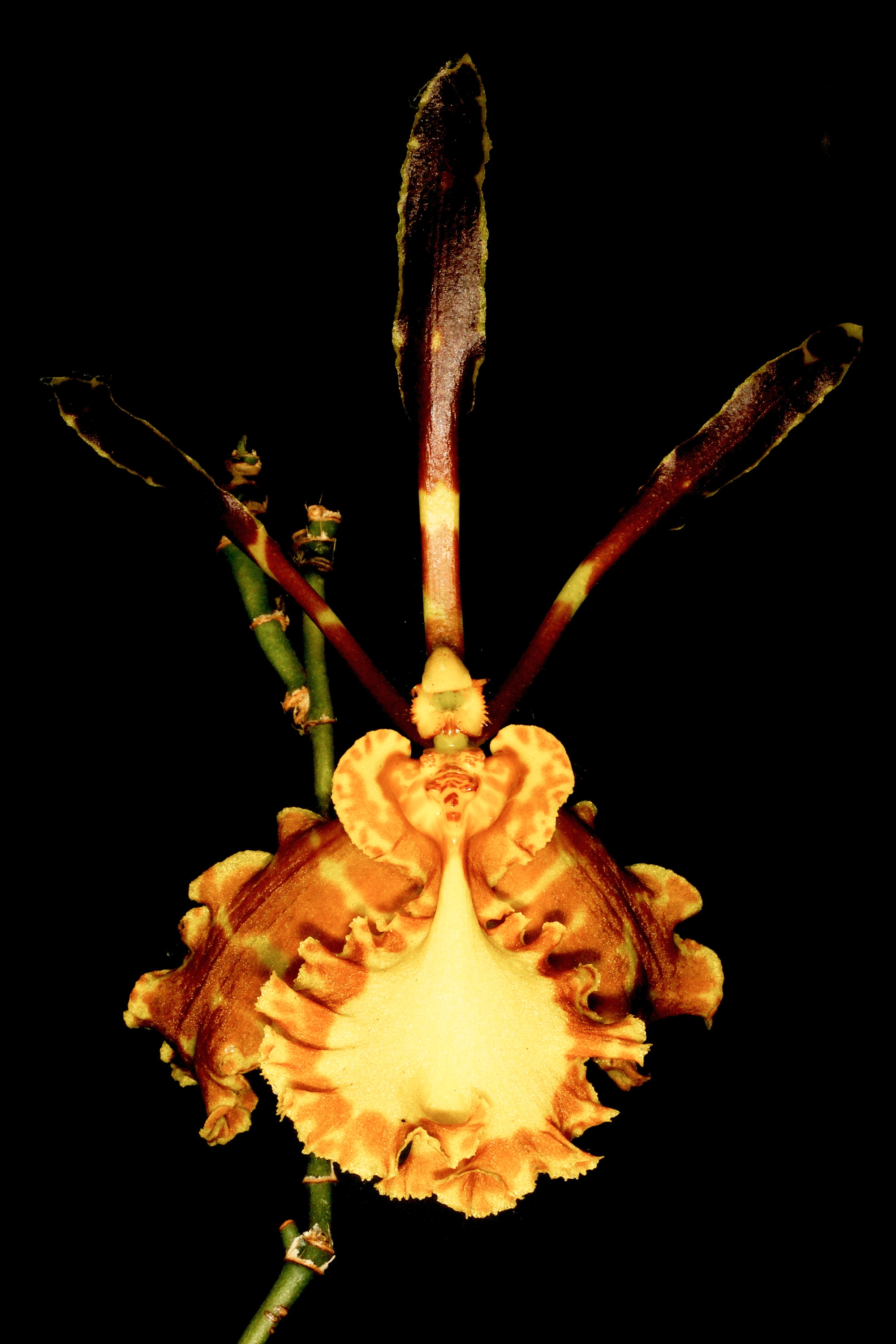

Scientific classification
- Kingdom: Plantae
- Clade: Tracheophytes
- Clade: Angiosperms
- Clade: Monocots
- Order: Asparagales
- Family: Orchidaceae
- Subfamily: Epidendroideae
- Genus: Psychopsis
- Species: P. krameriana

Binomial name
- Psychopsis krameriana (Rchb.f.) H.G.Jones

= Psychopsis krameriana =

Species of orchid

Psychopsis krameriana is a species of ornamental orchid.

== Distribution and habitat ==
Psychopsis krameriana is found in Costa Rica, Panama, Colombia, Ecuador, and Suriname.
