= Elizabeth L Kerr =

American ornithologist

- Born: United States of America
- Known for: Colombian bird surveys
- Scientific career
- Fields: Ornithology

Elizabeth L Kerr was an American ornithologist, who collected hundreds of birds for the American Museum of Natural History bird surveys in Colombia, in the first decades of 20th-century.

Frank Chapman, the organiser of the early 20th-century surveys and the museums curator of birds, used the Mrs. Kerr Collection to help with the distribution of Columbian birds. He relegated Kerr's contribution to a footnote in his The Distribution of Bird-Life in Colombia. A Contribution to a Biological Survey of South America. In 1915 he named the Choco tinamou, Crypturellus kerriae (Chapman, 1915) after her.

A group of female ornithologists surveying Colombian birds, consider Kerr an inspiration for 21st-century female ornithologists. Of the ninety species found by the 2020 expedition, twenty-six species were documented by Kerr.
