= Magdalena–Santa Marta mangroves =

Ecoregion in Colombia

Magdalena-Santa Marta mangroves
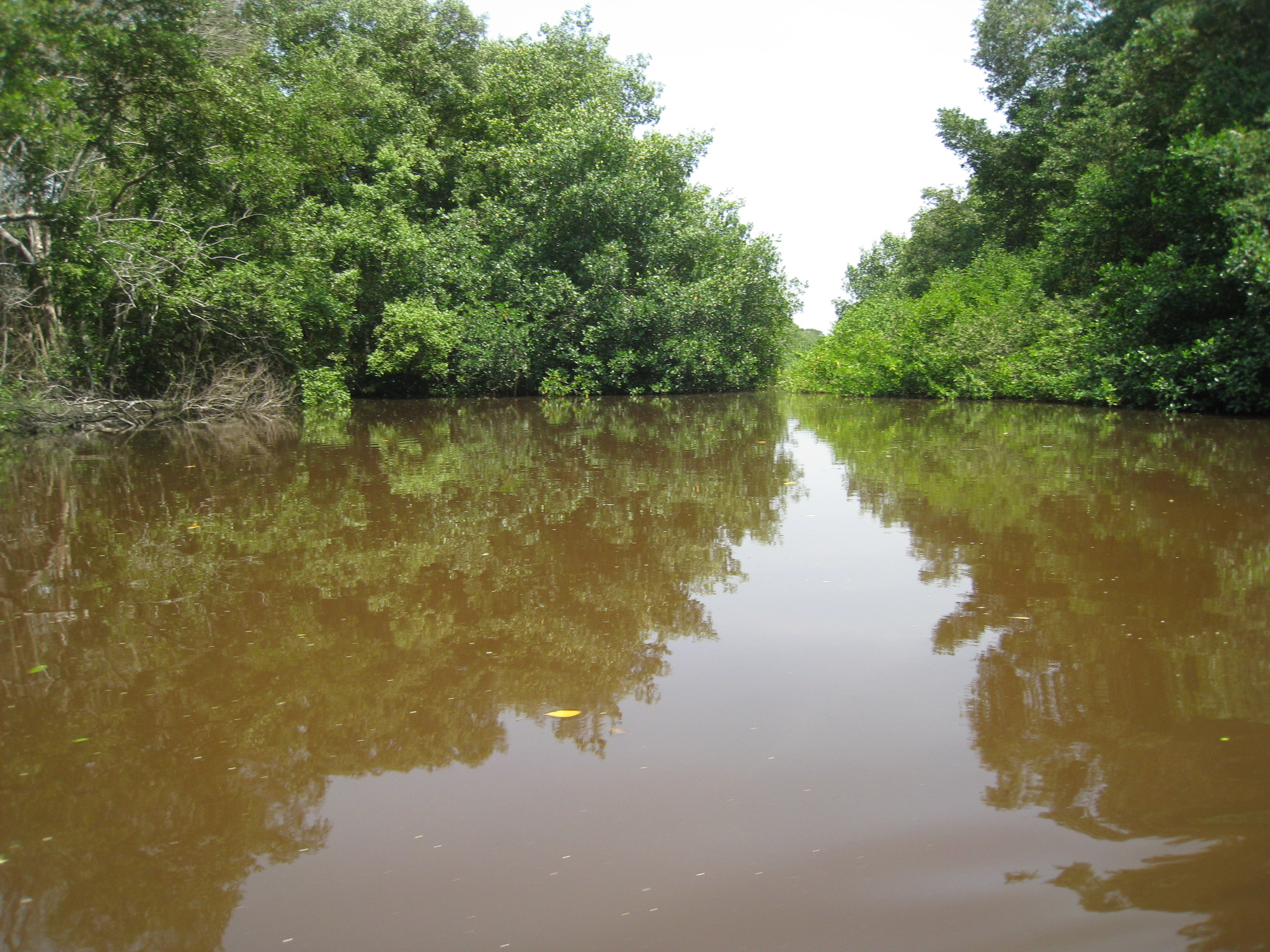
- Salamanca Island Road Park, Colombia, near the mouth of the Magdalena River

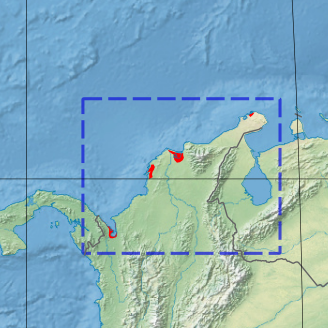
- Ecoregion territory (in red)

Ecology
- Realm: Neotropic
- Biome: Mangroves

Geography
- Area: 3,108 km^{2} (1,200 mi^{2})
- Country: Colombia
- Coordinates: 11°N 75.75°W

The Magdalena-Santa Marta mangroves ecoregion (WWF ID:NT1417) covers the mangrove forests along the coast of Colombia on the Caribbean Sea, from Gulf of Urabá in the west at the Colombia-Panama border to the Guajira Peninsula in the east. The region is relatively dry, with low precipitation and high evapotranspiration, so the mangroves depend for water and nutrients on the rivers flowing across the estuarine plain from the Sierra Nevada de Santa Marta mountains to the east. Efforts are currently underway to restore mangroves degraded by development and road building from the 1950s to 1980s.

== Location and description ==
Although this ecoregion stretches across 750 km of the Colombia coast, significant mangrove forests exist at only a few large sites. These sites are typically at the estuaries of large rivers or where low-lying plains meet the Caribbean. The main mangrove areas are (from southwest to northeast):

- Gulf of Urabá. Mangroves line the entire coast of this inlet, most deeply at the mouth of the Atrato River.
- Sinú River Delta. Mangroves heaviest in the broad swamp to the east of the river mouth. These first two mangrove areas are surrounded by the inland Magdalena–Urabá moist forests ecoregion.
- Gulf of Morrosquillo, supporting a small mangrove coast east of the mouth of the Sinu River. This site is immediately surrounded by the Guajira–Barranquilla xeric scrub ecoregion.
- Cartagena Bay and Rosario Islands, at the edge of the flat plain between the Sinu and Magdalena Rivers.
- Ciénaga Grande de Santa Marta, the "Large Marsh of Saint Martha" is at the mouth of the Magdalena River, and just east of the city of Barranquilla. A RAMSAR wetland of international importance.
- Tayrona National Natural Park, at the flat coastal foot of the Sierra Nevada de Santa Marta mountain range, just east of the city of Santa Marta
- Honda Bay, on the Guajira Peninsula near the northern tip of Colombia, 60 km from the border with Venezuela.

== Climate ==
The climate of the ecoregion is Tropical savanna climate - dry winter (Köppen climate classification (Aw)). This climate is characterized by relatively even temperatures throughout the year, and a pronounced dry season. The driest month has less than 60 mm of precipitation, and is drier than the average month. Precipitation in the ecoregion is relatively low, 460-700 mm/year, with high evapotranspiration (1,400 mm/year).

== Flora and fauna ==
The mangroves are mixed forests, with characteristic species of red mangrove (Rhizophora mangle), black mangrove (Avicennia germinans), white mangrove (Laguncularia racemosa), and buttonwood (Conocarpus erectus). Almost half of the mangrove areas have been degraded in the past 40 years by increasing salinity and decreased flows in fresh water caused by human development.

The mangroves are important nurseries for fish, with over 130 species of fish identified in the mangroves around Santa Marta alone.

== Protected areas ==
Officially protected areas covering portions of these mangrove sites include:

- Corales del Rosario National Park
- Salamanca Island Road Park
- Tayrona National Natural Park
