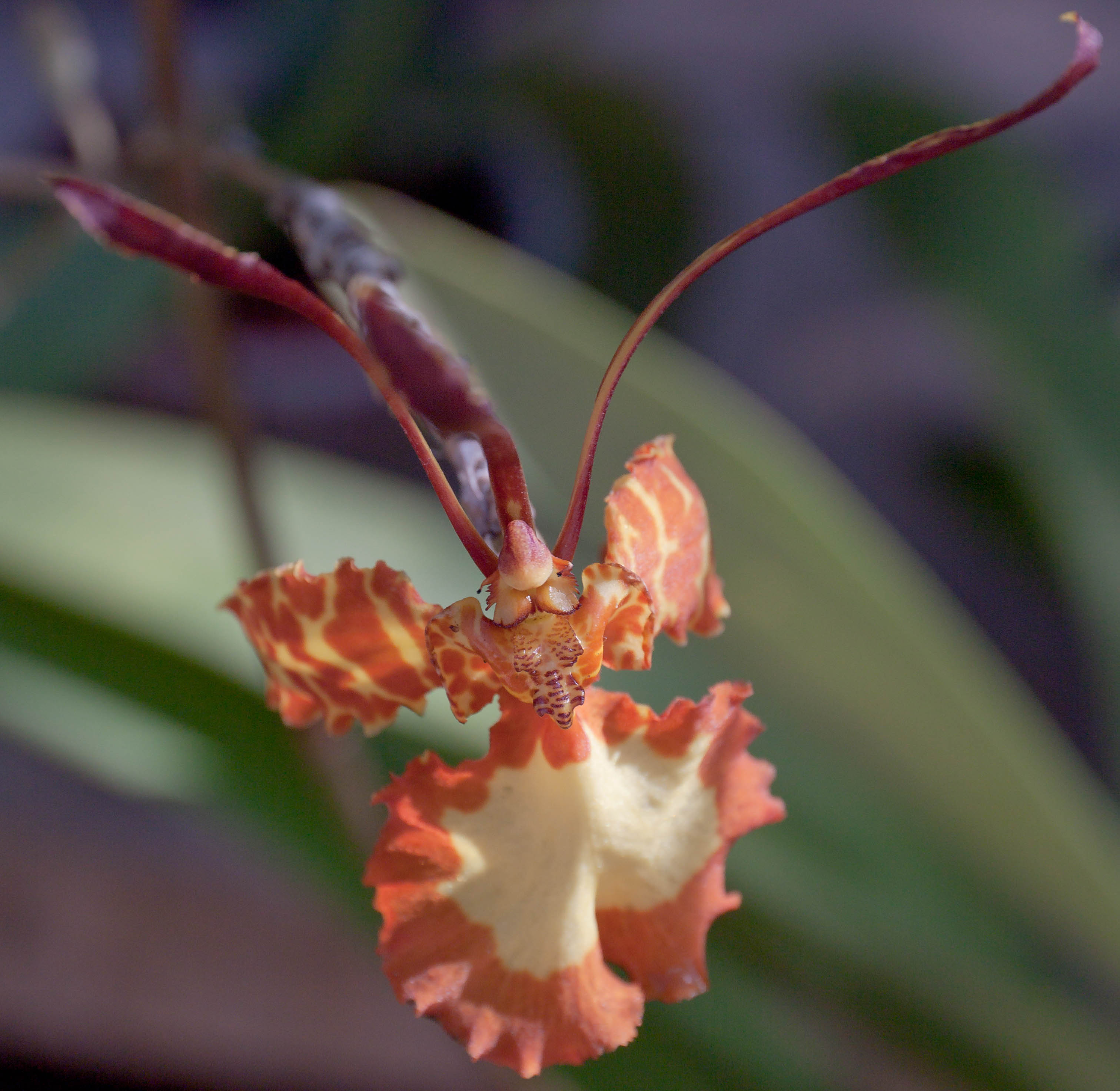

Scientific classification
- Kingdom: Plantae
- Clade: Tracheophytes
- Clade: Angiosperms
- Clade: Monocots
- Order: Asparagales
- Family: Orchidaceae
- Subfamily: Epidendroideae
- Genus: Psychopsis
- Species: P. versteegiana

Binomial name
- Psychopsis versteegiana (Pulle) Lückel & Braem

= Psychopsis versteegiana =

Species of orchid

Psychopsis versteegiana is a species of ornamental orchid.

== Distribution and habitat ==
Psychopsis versteegiana is found in French Guiana.
