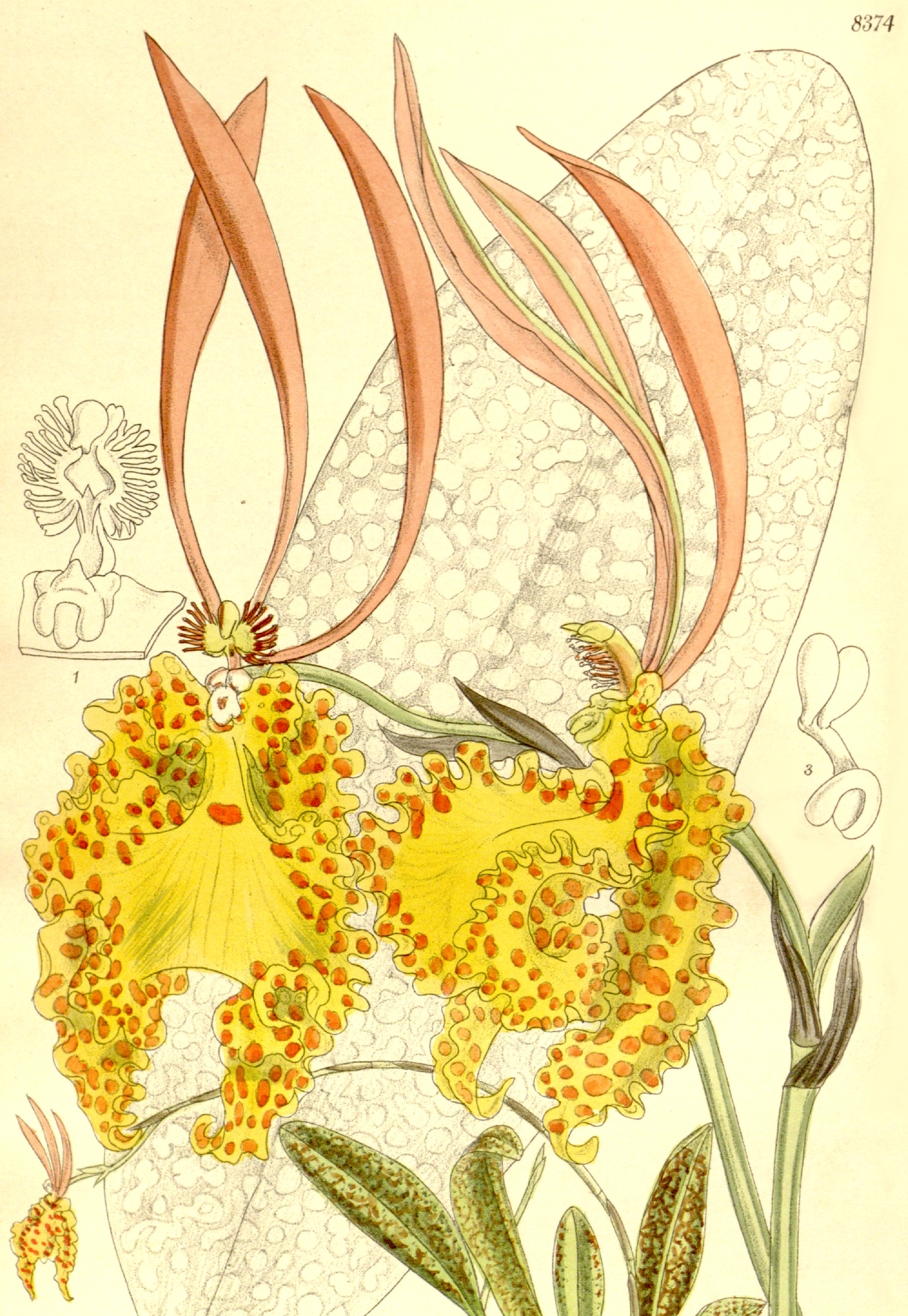

Scientific classification
- Kingdom: Plantae
- Clade: Tracheophytes
- Clade: Angiosperms
- Clade: Monocots
- Order: Asparagales
- Family: Orchidaceae
- Subfamily: Epidendroideae
- Genus: Psychopsis
- Species: P. sanderae

Binomial name
- Psychopsis sanderae (Rolfe) Lückel & Braem

= Psychopsis sanderae =

Species of orchid

Psychopsis sanderae is a species of ornamental orchid.
