= San Juan de Micay River =

River in Colombia

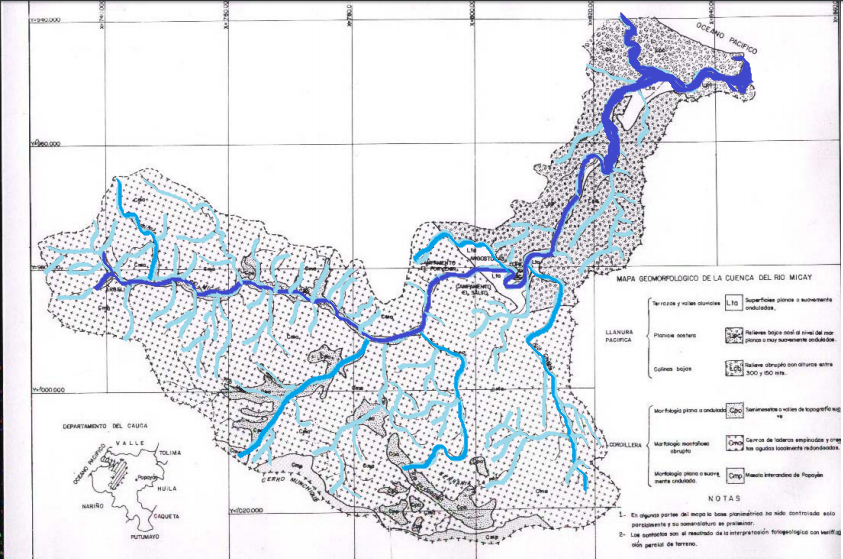
- Micay River Basin

- Mouth location in Colombia

Location
- Country: Colombia

Physical characteristics
- Mouth
  - coordinates: 3°11′51″N 77°30′31″W

The San Juan de Micay River is a river of Colombia. It drains into the Pacific Ocean.

The river basin is in the Chocó–Darién moist forests ecoregion, an area of dense tropical rainforest with exceptionally high rainfall.

== See also ==
- List of rivers of Colombia

== Sources ==
- D’ambrosio, Ugo, Northern South America: Western Colombia into southeastern Panama (NT0115), WWF: Worldwide Fund for Nature
