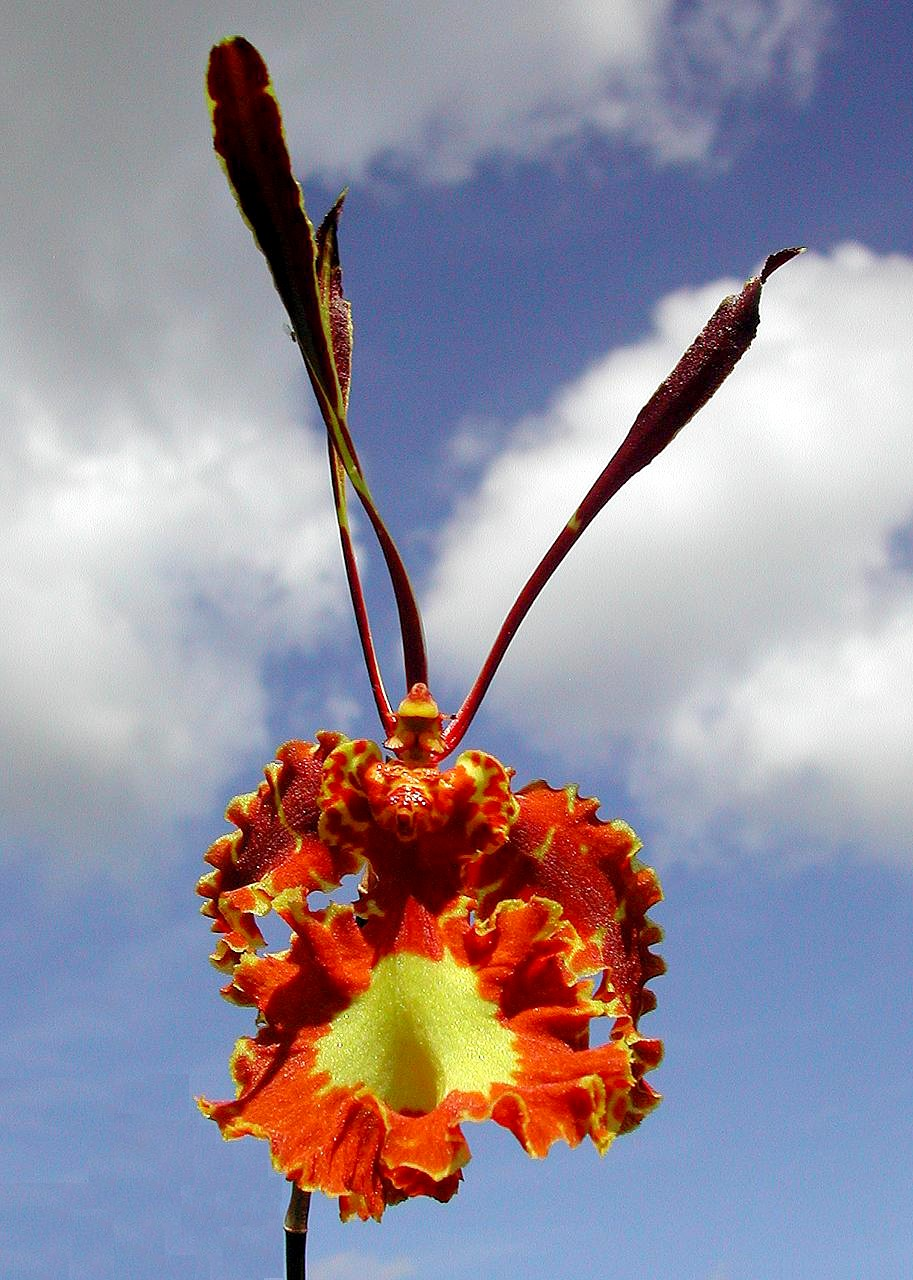

Scientific classification
- Kingdom: Plantae
- Clade: Tracheophytes
- Clade: Angiosperms
- Clade: Monocots
- Order: Asparagales
- Family: Orchidaceae
- Subfamily: Epidendroideae
- Genus: Psychopsis
- Species: P. papilio

Binomial name
- Psychopsis papilio (Lindl.) H.G.Jones

= Psychopsis papilio =

Species of orchid

Psychopsis papilio is a species of orchid.

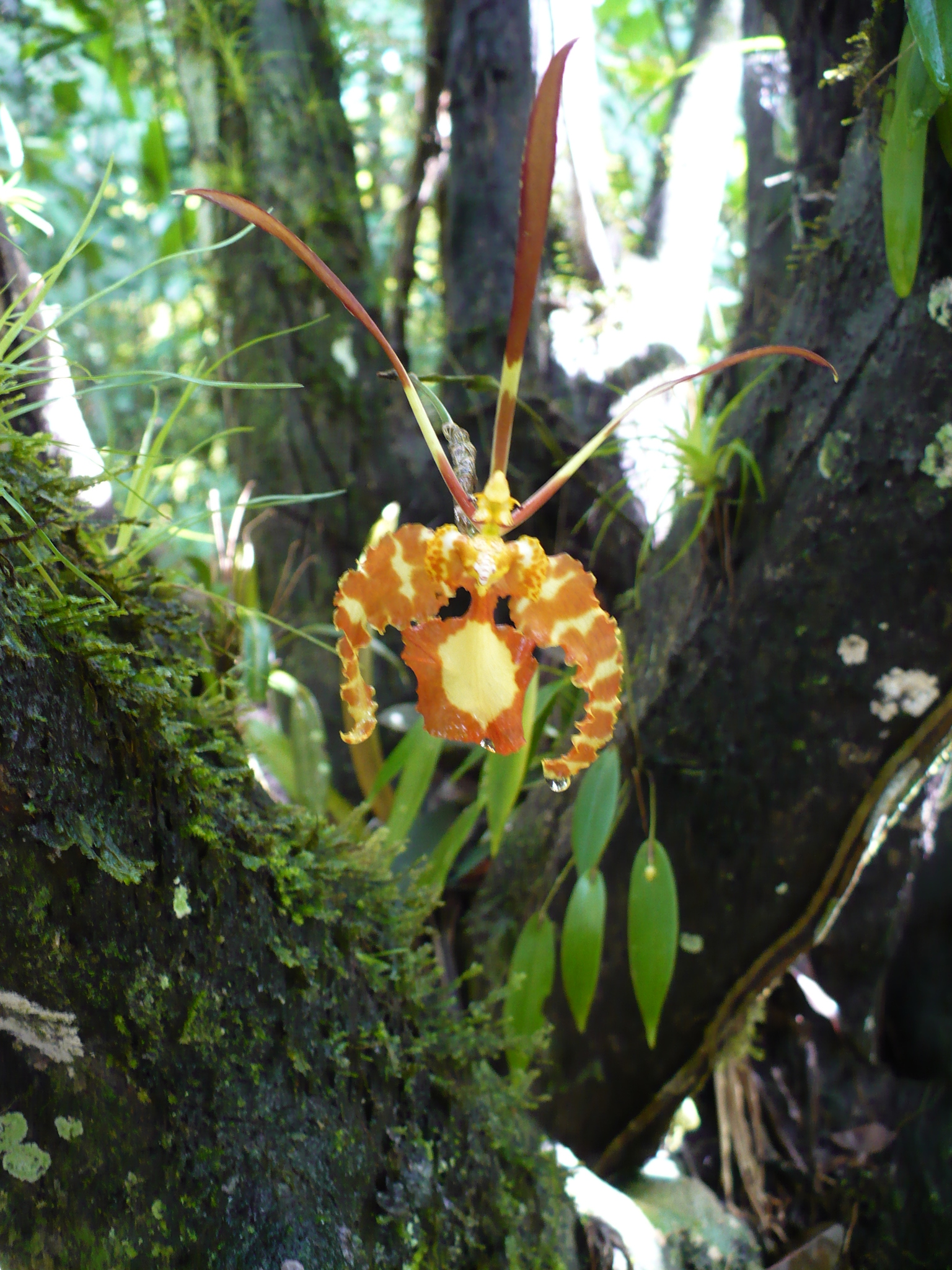
In situ, Trinidad

== Distribution and habitat ==
Psychopsis papilio is found in Panama, Trinidad, Colombia, Venezuela, Suriname, French Guiana, and Brazil.
