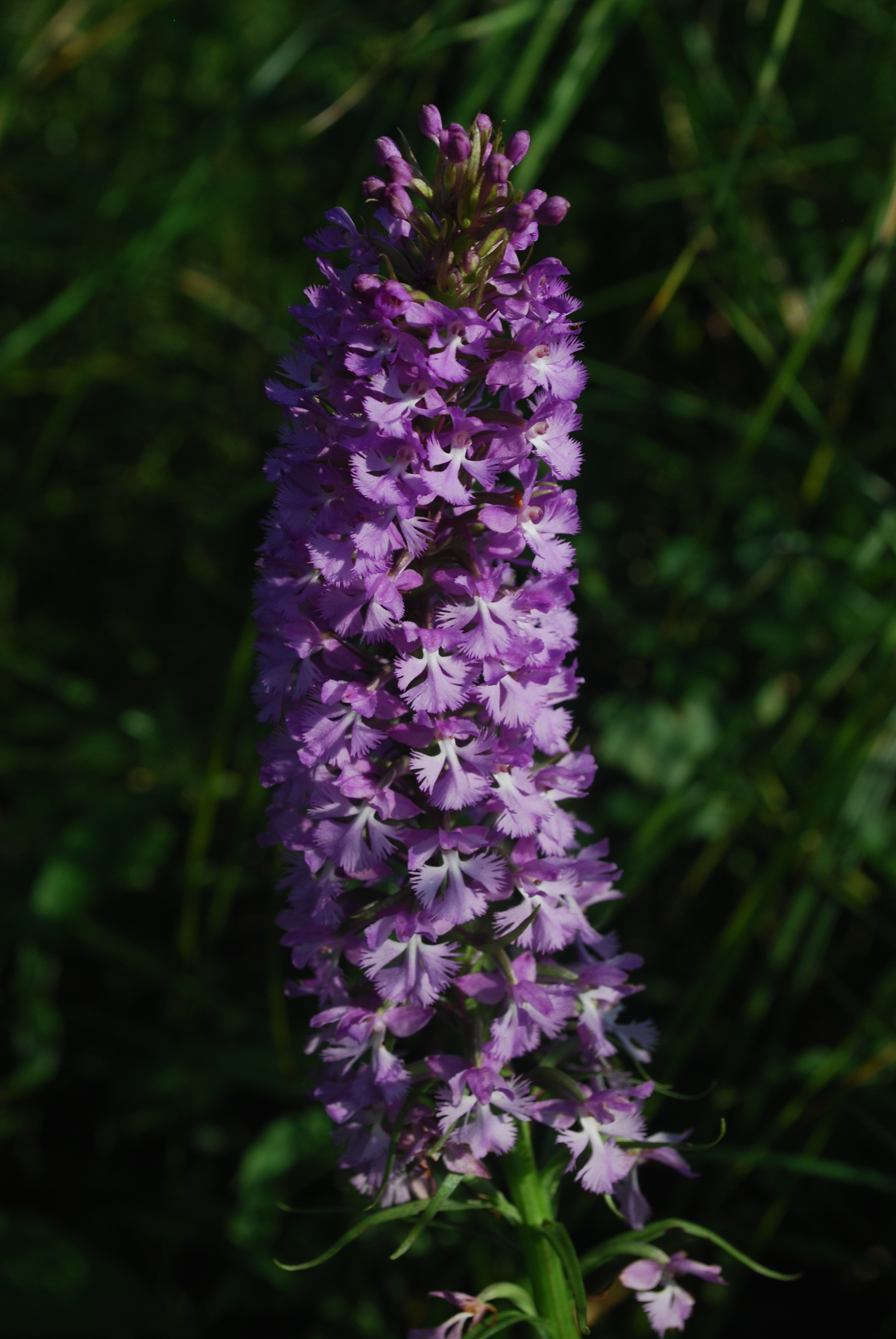

Conservation status
- Secure (NatureServe)

Scientific classification
- Kingdom: Plantae
- Clade: Embryophytes
- Clade: Tracheophytes
- Clade: Spermatophytes
- Clade: Angiosperms
- Clade: Monocots
- Order: Asparagales
- Family: Orchidaceae
- Subfamily: Orchidoideae
- Genus: Platanthera
- Species: P. psycodes

Binomial name
- Platanthera psycodes (L.) A.Gray

Synonyms
- Orchis psycodes L. (basionym); Blephariglottis psycodes f. albispicata House; Blephariglottis psycodes Rydb.; Fimbriella psycodes (L.) Butzin; Habenaria fissa (Muhl. ex Willd.) Spreng.; Habenaria psycodes (L.) Spreng.; Habenaria psycodes f. albiflora R.Hoffm.; Habenaria psycodes f. ecalcarata (M.M.Bryan) Dole; Habenaria psycodes f. varians (M.M.Bryan) Fernald; Habenaria psycodes var. ecalcarata M.M.Bryan; Habenaria psycodes var. varians M.M.Bryan; Habenaria racemosa Raf.; Orchis fissa Muhl. ex Willd.; Orchis incisa Muhl. ex Willd.; Orchis psycodes L.; Platanthera psycodes f. albiflora (R.Hoffm.) R.E.Whiting & Catling; Platanthera psycodes f. ecalcarata (M.M.Bryan) P.M.Br.; Platanthera psycodes f. rosea P.M.Br.; Platanthera psycodes f. varians (M.M.Bryan) P.M.Br.

= Platanthera psycodes =

Species of orchid

Platanthera psycodes is a species in the orchid family, Orchidaceae, commonly called the lesser purple fringed orchid or small purple-fringed orchid.

== Description ==
=== Vegetative morphology ===
The plants are 14–101 cm tall with 3–5 leaves, each 5–22 cm long and 1.5–7 cm wide.

=== Floral morphology ===
The flowers are arranged in a raceme at the end of the stem and vary in number from 30 to 50. Depending on the length of the inflorescence, which varies from 8–12 cm (or sometimes longer), the flowers may be densely- or loosely-arranged. Flowers vary in color from lavender to rose-purple or sometimes white. The dorsal petal, called the lip, is 5–13 mm long, 5–17 mm wide, points downward, and has three deeply-fringed lobes. The lateral petals and dorsal sepal point upward, and the two lateral sepals curve backward and point toward the stem.

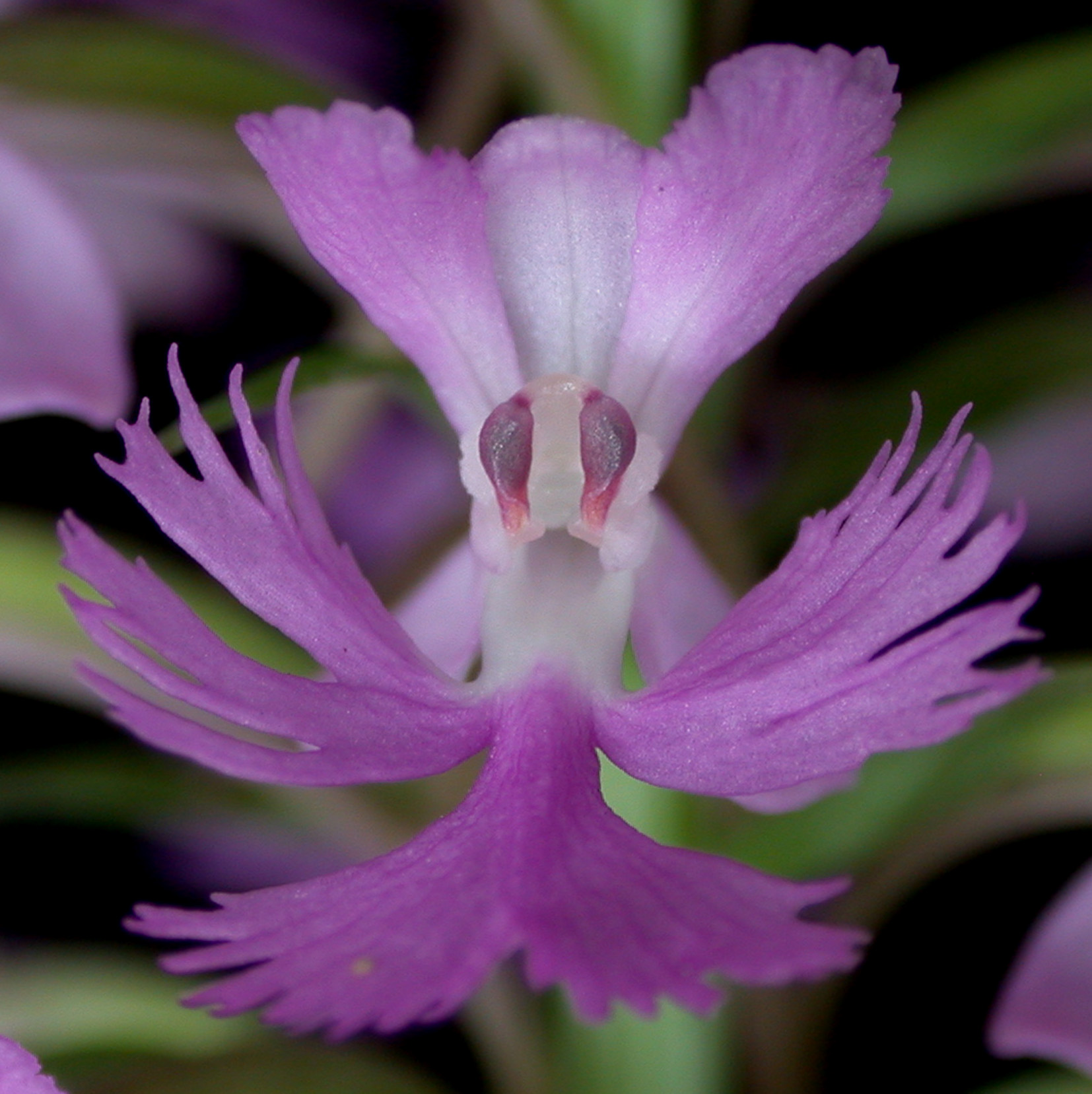
front view of a flower, showing the column

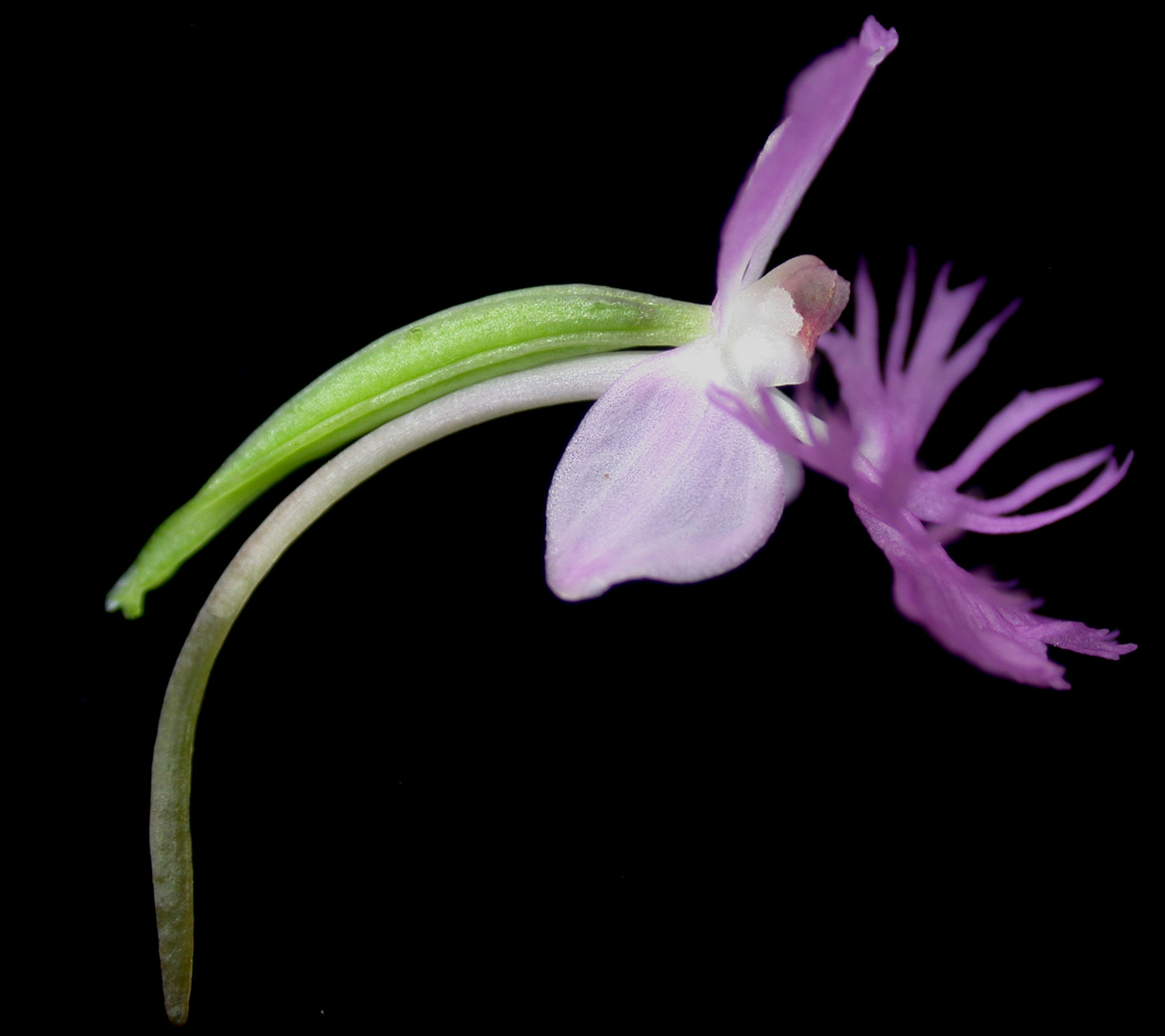
side view of a flower, showing the slendar nectar spur

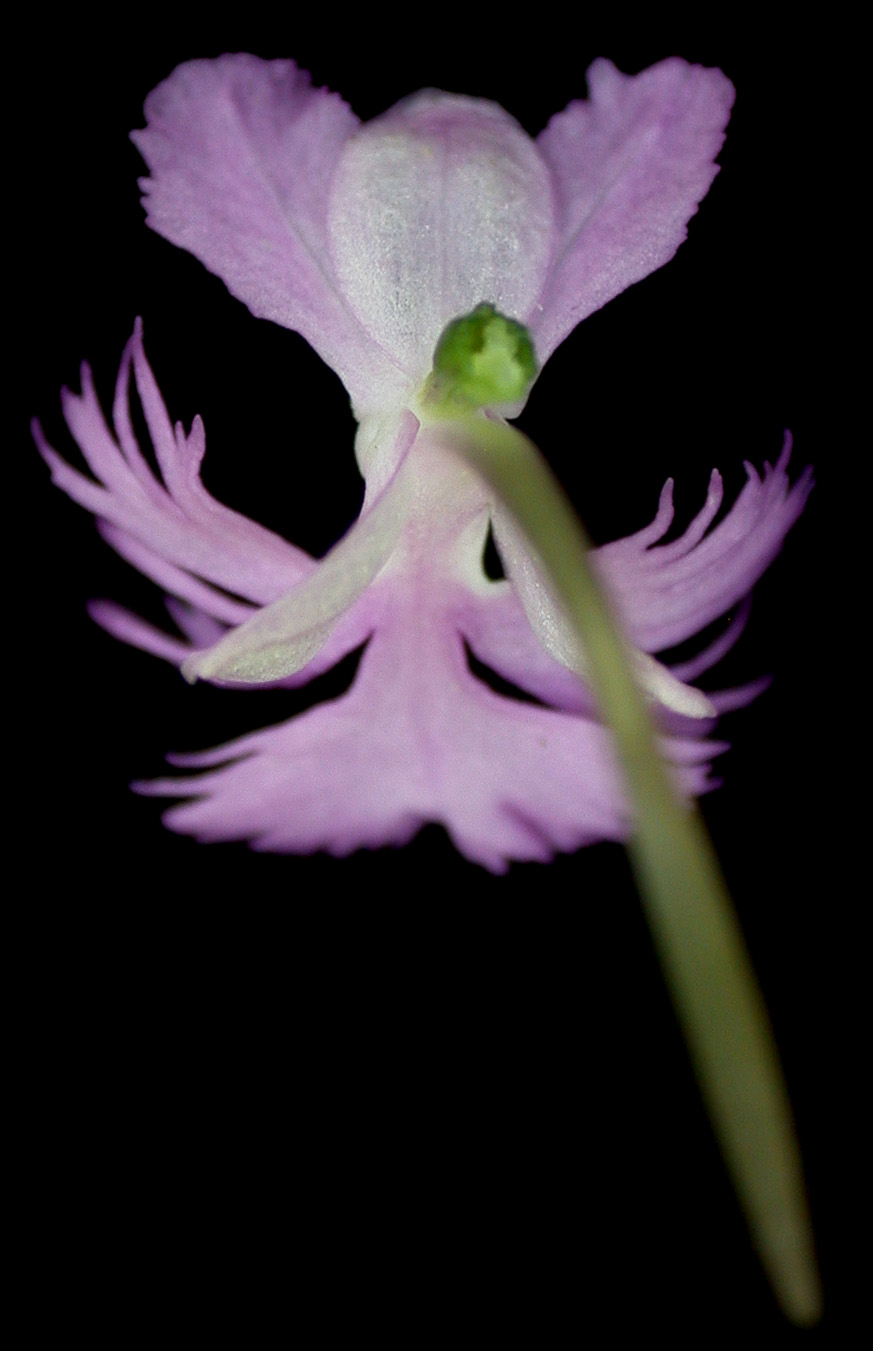
back view of a flower

=== Similar species ===
Platanthera psycodes is often confused with its relative, P. grandiflora. The most important characteristic separating the two species is the shape and orientation of reproductive structures in the column, reflecting different pollination strategies. In P. psycodes, the pollinia are held close together are nearly parallel, and are obscured from the sides by wing-like structures; in P. psycodes, the column is larger, the viscidia of the pollinia are widely spaced and outwardly rotated, and the pollinia are visible from a side view. Moreover, the opening to the nectary is oblong and sometimes partially divided in P. psycodes but circular and undivided in P. grandiflora. The result is that the pollinia are deposited near the base of a pollinator's proboscis by P. psycodes and on a pollinator's eyes by P. grandiflora.

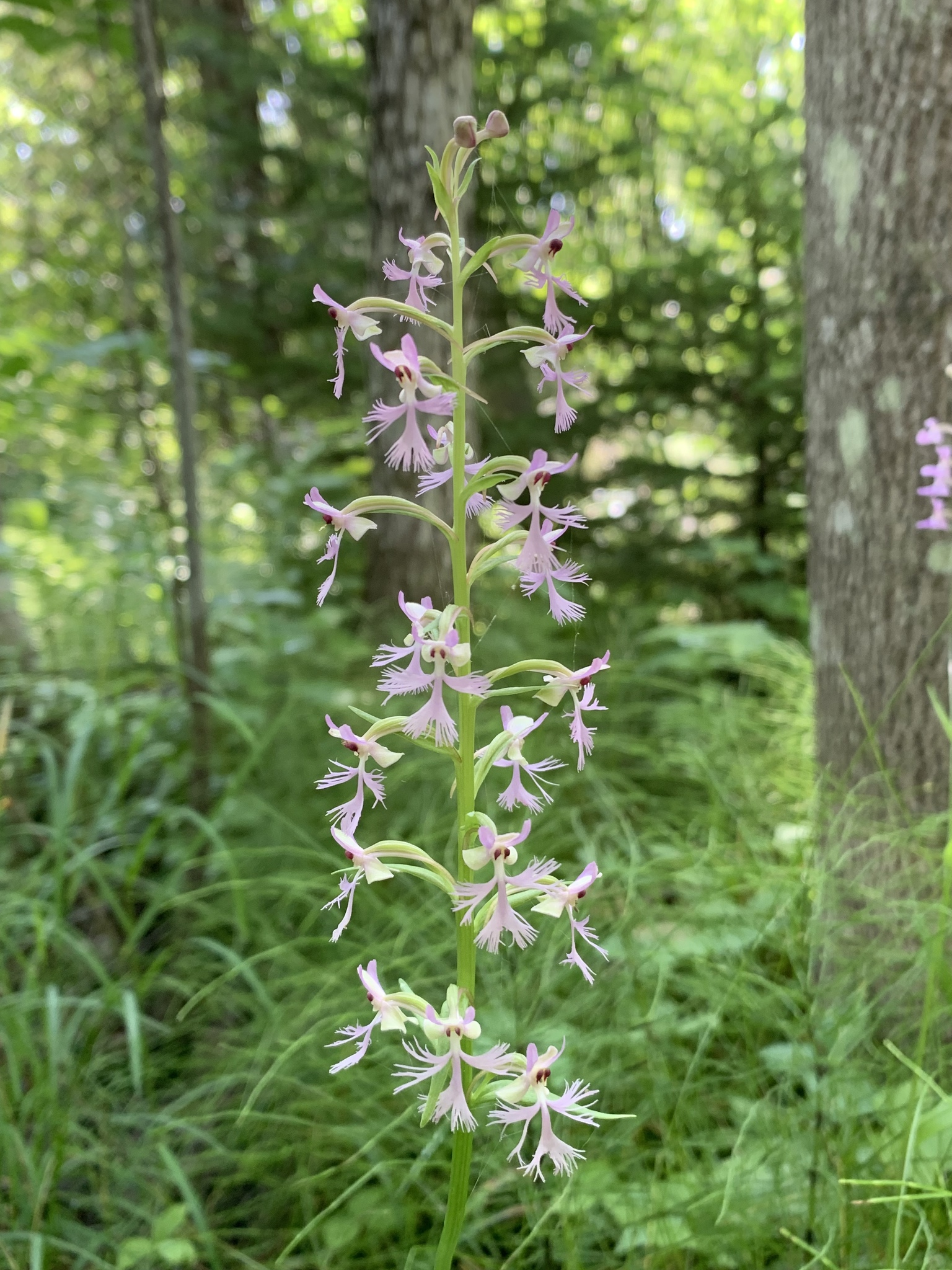
the hybrid P. × andrewsii with intermediate morphology between its parents, P. lacera and P. psycodes

P. grandiflora generally has larger flowers (lip or labellum 10 to 25 millimetres (1/3 to 1 in) long) compared to P. psycodes which has smaller flowers (the labellum measuring from 5 to 13 millimetres (1/4 to 1/2 in) long). P. grandiflora has a much more restricted range and where the two species do overlap in range, they are phenotypically separated, with P. grandiflora typically blooming from late June through early July while P. psycodes blooms from late July through early August.

== Taxonomy ==
The specific epithet psycodes is a misspelling of psychodes, which means "butterfly-like", probably alluding to the shape of the flowers.

== Distribution and habitat ==
Platanthera psycodes occurs from eastern Canada (from Manitoba to Newfoundland) to the east-central and northeastern United States (Great Lakes Region, Appalachian Mountains, and New England). It is imperiled in Illinois, Tennessee, North Carolina, and Kentucky.

Like many other orchids it is a plant of wet habitats: sedge meadows, flatwoods, sphagnum bogs, cedar or alder swamps, on stream edges or the moist edges of coniferous forests. It is occasionally found in wet swales adjoining freshwater sandy beaches. Preferring cooler habitats, its range is being pushed northwards as global temperatures warm. Correll refers to locations of 1,500-foot (460 m) altitudes in Vermont, 4,000-foot (1,200 m) altitudes in Virginia and 6,500-foot (2,000 m) altitudes in North Carolina and Tennessee.
