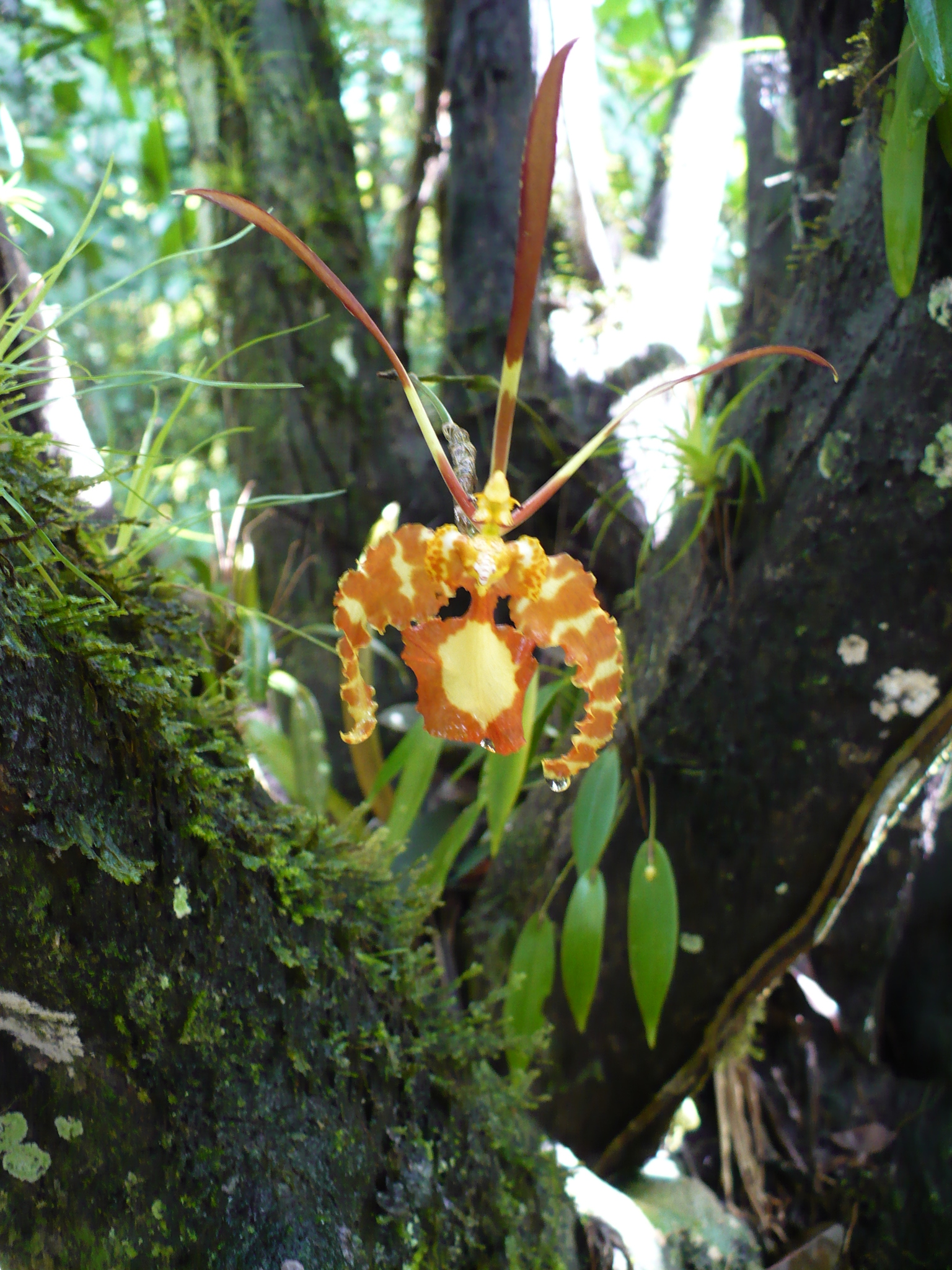
- Psychopsis papilio In situ in Trinidad

Scientific classification
- Kingdom: Plantae
- Clade: Embryophytes
- Clade: Tracheophytes
- Clade: Spermatophytes
- Clade: Angiosperms
- Clade: Monocots
- Order: Asparagales
- Family: Orchidaceae
- Subfamily: Epidendroideae
- Tribe: Cymbidieae
- Subtribe: Oncidiinae
- Genus: Psychopsis; Raf.

Type species
- Psychopsis papilio

Synonyms
- Papiliopsis E.Morren ex Cogn. & Marchal; Papiliopsis E.Morren

= Psychopsis =

Butterfly orchid

Genus of plants

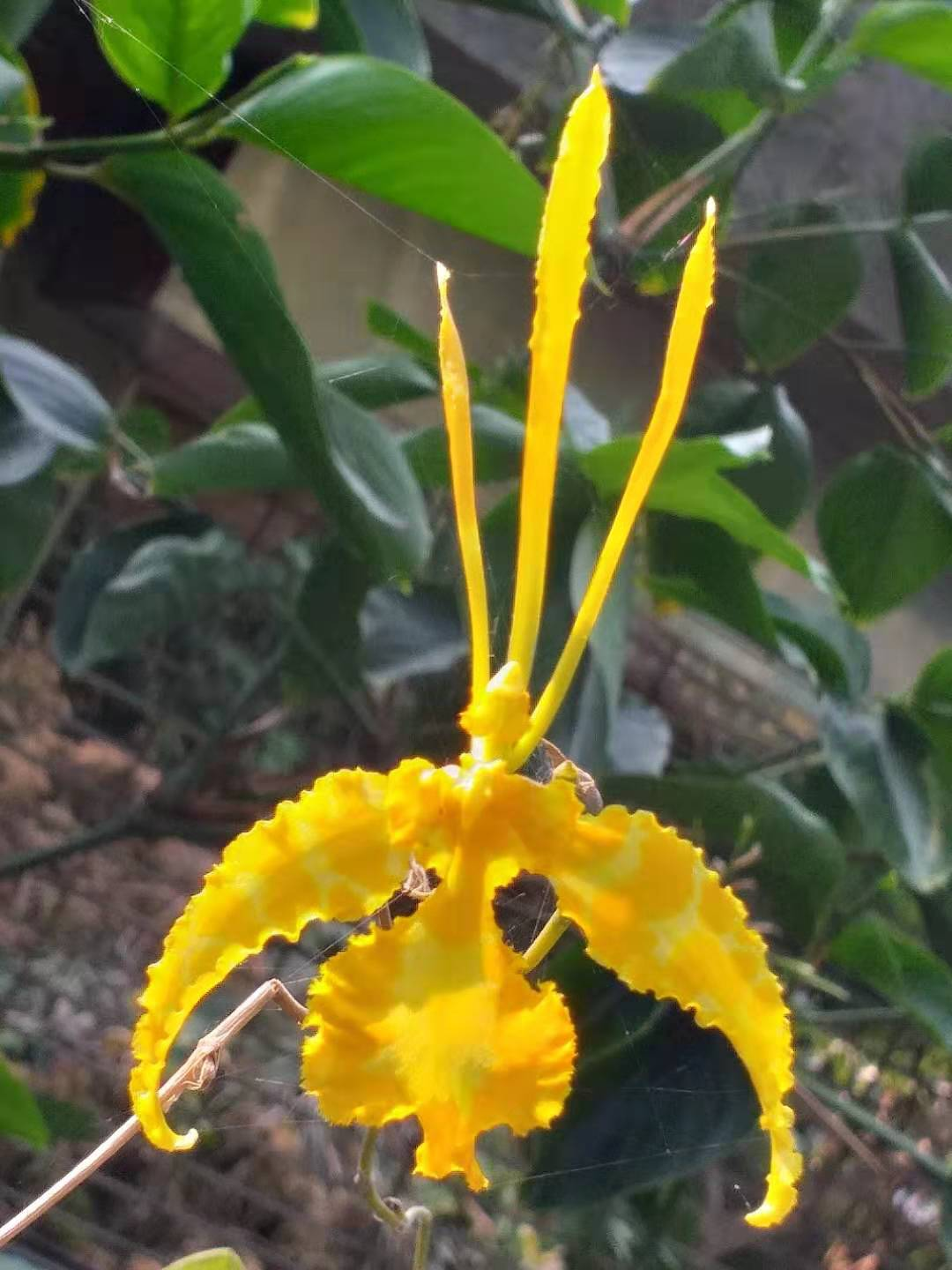
Psychopsis 'Kalihi' (Psychopsis krameriana × Psychopsis papilio )

Psychopsis is a genus of four known species of orchids native to northern South America, Central America and Trinidad. The genus name is abbreviated Pyp. in the horticultural trade.

== Description ==
Psychopsis are epiphytic orchids with laterally crushed cylindrical pseudobulbs from which two fleshy coriaceous leaves appear apically, in their center two floral wands emerge with large golden yellow flowers with purple spots on bands in sepals and on the lip whose edges are forming folds.

Psychopsis very often grows on the trunks and branches of trees. The flowers look like large butterflies with brightly colored bodies (the lip, a modified petal), very long antennae-like petals, and outspread wing-like dappled yellow and brown sepals.

The butterfly orchid is rumored to have started the European "Orchidmania" of the 19th century.

Very little is known about pollination in Psychopsis. Despite that the flowers are commonly likened to butterflies, they are probably pollinated by some type of bee, not butterflies.

== Taxonomy ==
Psychopsis was formerly included in the massively paraphyletic "wastebin genus" Oncidium within the section Glanduligera, named after the genus's distinctive oil-secreting glands. Orchids in this genus are commonly called butterfly orchids, but some species of other orchid genera are also called thus. The species Psychopsiella limminghei was once included in Psychopsis but is now accepted as its own monotypic genus.

=== Species ===
Species currently accepted as of October 2020:

Image	Name	Distribution	Elevation (m)
	Psychopsis krameriana (Rchb.f.) H.G.Jones	Costa Rica, Panama, Colombia, Ecuador, Suriname	50 - 1300
	Psychopsis papilio (Lindl.) H.G.Jones	Panama, Trinidad, Colombia, Venezuela, Suriname, French Guiana, Brazil	800 - 1200
	Psychopsis sanderae (Rolfe) Lückel & Braem	Peru, Brazil	1220
	Psychopsis versteegiana (Pulle) Lückel & Braem	Suriname, Ecuador	200 - 1200
