= Atelopus longibrachius =

Conservation status
- Endangered (IUCN 3.1)

Scientific classification
- Kingdom: Animalia
- Phylum: Chordata
- Class: Amphibia
- Order: Anura
- Family: Bufonidae
- Genus: Atelopus
- Species: A. longibrachius

Binomial name
- Atelopus longibrachius Rivero, 1963

Species of amphibian

Atelopus longibrachius, the El Tambo stubfoot toad, is a species of toad in the family Bufonidae. It is endemic to Colombia and known from the region of its type locality, El Tambo, Cauca, as well as from Chocó, both on the western flanks of Cordillera Occidental. Its natural habitats are tropical moist lowland forests where it lives on the ground. Breeding is assumed to take place in streams. It is potentially threatened by chytridiomycosis and habitat loss.
