= Choco tinamou =

Conservation status
- Near Threatened (IUCN 3.1)

Scientific classification
- Kingdom: Animalia
- Phylum: Chordata
- Class: Aves
- Infraclass: Palaeognathae
- Order: Tinamiformes
- Family: Tinamidae
- Genus: Crypturellus
- Species: C. kerriae

Binomial name
- Crypturellus kerriae (Chapman, 1915)

Synonyms
- Crypturus kerriae

Species of bird

The Choco tinamou or Chocó tinamou (Crypturellus kerriae) is a type of tinamou found in lowland forest and montane forest in subtropical and tropical regions of Colombia and Panama.

== Description ==
The Choco tinamou is approximately 25 to 26.5 cm (9.8–10.4 in) in length. It is a small, plain dark tinamou. Its upperparts are dark brown, with a blackish crown, slate-grey sides of neck, whitish throat and indistinct dusky barring. Its legs are red. The females are darker with coarser barring on wing-coverts and breast, and grey flanks.

== Behavior ==
It has a low, faint, mournful, three-note whistle voice. Like other tinamous, the Choco tinamou eats fruit off the ground or low-lying bushes. They also eat small amounts of invertebrates, flower buds, tender leaves, seeds, and roots. The male incubates the eggs which may come from as many as 4 different females, and then will raise them until they are ready to be on their own, usually 2–3 weeks. The nest is located on the ground in dense brush or between raised root buttresses.

== Taxonomy ==
The Choco tinamou is a monotypic species. All tinamou are from the family Tinamidae, and in the larger scheme are also ratites. Unlike other ratites, tinamous can fly, although in general, they are not strong fliers. All ratites evolved from prehistoric flying birds, and tinamous are the closest living relative of these birds.

== Etymology ==
Crypturellus is formed from three Latin or Greek words. kruptos meaning covered or hidden, oura meaning tail, and ellus meaning diminutive. Therefore, Crypturellus means small hidden tail. The species name kerriae honors Elizabeth L. Kerr, an American bird collector in Colombia, who collected the holotype.

== Range ==
This species is found in northwestern Chocó Department Colombia, and southern Darién Department Panama

== Habitat ==
The Choco tinamou resides in tropical and sub-tropical moist evergreen forests both lowland and montane up to 1,500 m (4,900 ft) in altitude. However, it seems that it prefers higher elevations.

=== Threats ===
The Choco tinamou is currently threatened by the vast destruction of its habitats caused by road construction, human settlement, timber extraction and mining. The completion of a new road-bridge has made unprotected areas of coastal plain forest adjacent to the Ensenada de Utría National Park accessible to settlement and further threatens its habitats. The population at Atrato valley, Colombia, would probably be the most threatened caused by human settlement, and conversion to farmland and banana plantations. It is presumably hunted wherever humans are present. The completion of the Pan-American highway through Darién and the canalisation of the Truandó and lower Atrato Rivers, to make an inter-oceanic fairway, are currently on hold, but could have serious effects on the species if it is to be completed. The biggest threats are hunting, and the on-hold transportation plans.

=== Conservation measures ===
The Choco tinamou is currently protected in Darién National Park, Panama, and Ensenada de Utría National Park, Colombia. Los Katíos National Park, Colombia, also protects 720 km^{2} (280 sq mi) of apparently suitable habitat in the Chocó region, but the species has yet to be recorded in the reserve. It was proposed to survey areas and study the ecology to provide an improved understanding of its status and distribution. The status of Choco tinamou is Near Threatened because it is known from only a few locations within its small range where habitat is gradually disappearing. It has an occurrence range of 18,770 km^{2} (7,250 sq mi), with an estimated population of 1,300 – 7,800 mature individuals in 2023.
