= Cremosperma =

Scientific classification
- Kingdom: Plantae
- Clade: Tracheophytes
- Clade: Angiosperms
- Clade: Eudicots
- Clade: Asterids
- Order: Lamiales
- Family: Gesneriaceae
- Genus: Cremosperma; Benth.

Genus of flowering plants

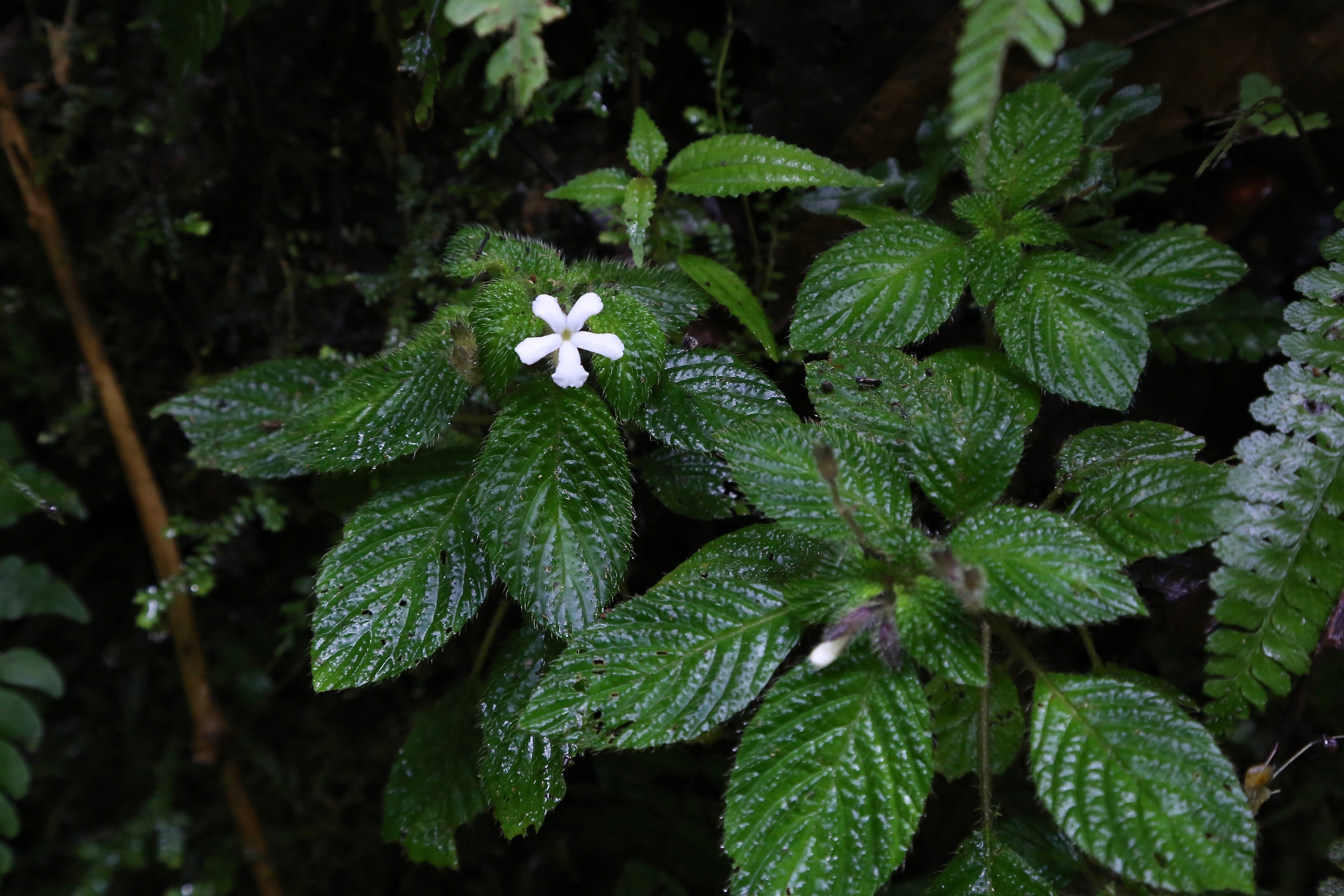
Cremosperma verticillatum

Cremosperma is a genus of flowering plants belonging to the family Gesneriaceae.

Its native range is Panama to Peru.

Species:

- Cremosperma anisophyllum J.L.Clark & L.E.Skog
- Cremosperma auriculatum C.V.Morton
- Cremosperma castroanum C.V.Morton
- Cremosperma congruens C.V.Morton
- Cremosperma cotejense C.V.Morton
- Cremosperma ecuadoranum L.P.Kvist & L.E.Skog
- Cremosperma filicifolium L.P.Kvist & L.E.Skog
- Cremosperma hirsutissimum Benth.
- Cremosperma humidum L.P.Kvist & L.E.Skog
- Cremosperma ignotum C.V.Morton
- Cremosperma inversum B.R.Keener & J.L.Clark
- Cremosperma jucundum C.V.Morton
- Cremosperma maculatum L.E.Skog
- Cremosperma micropecten Fern.Alonso
- Cremosperma muscicola L.P.Kvist & L.E.Skog
- Cremosperma nobile C.V.Morton
- Cremosperma occidentale Wiehler
- Cremosperma parviflorum C.V.Morton
- Cremosperma peruvianum L.E.Skog
- Cremosperma pusillum C.V.Morton
- Cremosperma reldioides L.P.Kvist & L.E.Skog
- Cremosperma serratum C.V.Morton
- Cremosperma sylvaticum C.V.Morton
- Cremosperma veraguanum Wiehler
- Cremosperma verticillatum J.L.Clark & B.R.Keener
