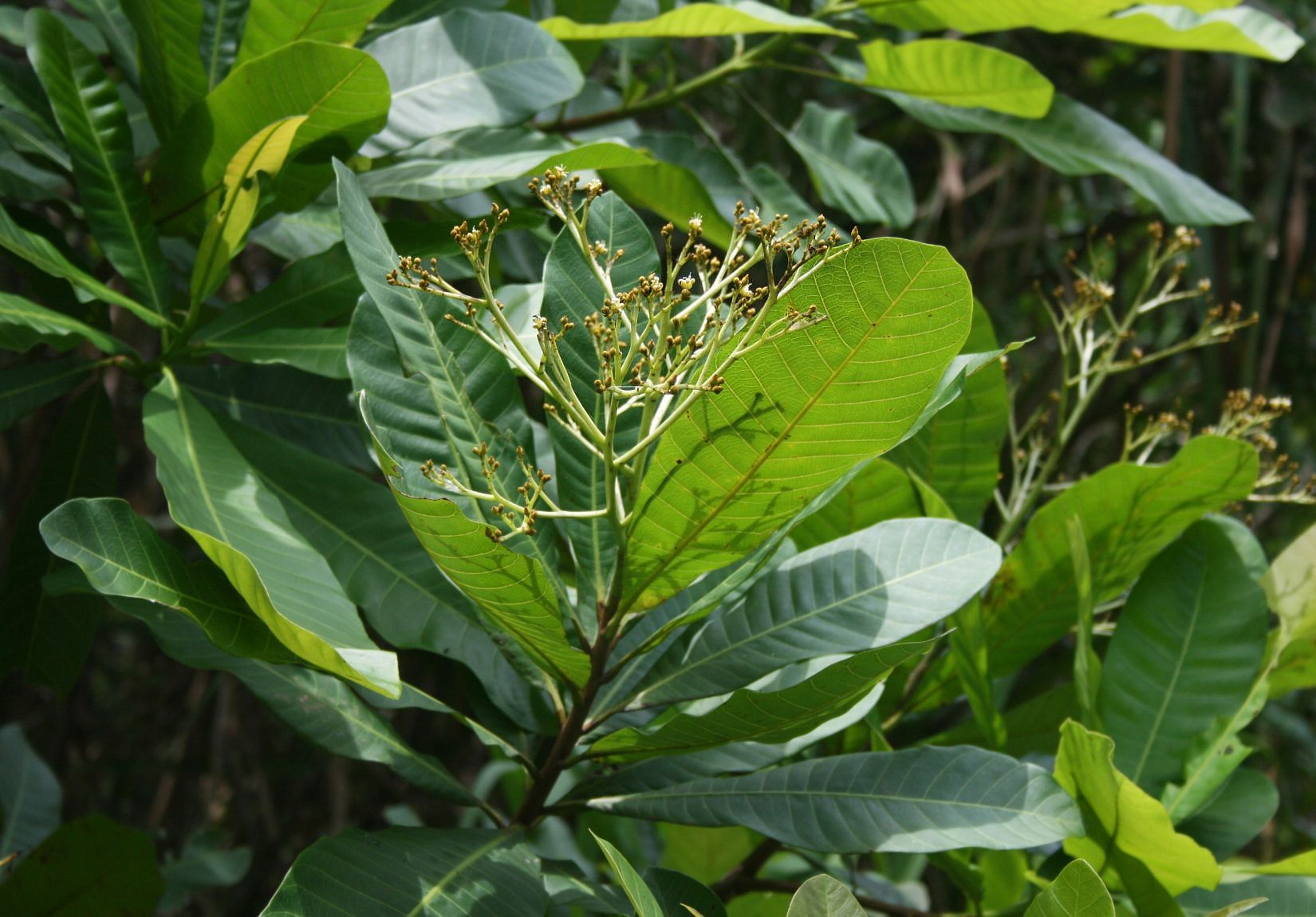

Conservation status
- Least Concern (IUCN 3.1)

Scientific classification
- Kingdom: Plantae
- Clade: Embryophytes
- Clade: Tracheophytes
- Clade: Spermatophytes
- Clade: Angiosperms
- Clade: Eudicots
- Clade: Rosids
- Order: Sapindales
- Family: Anacardiaceae
- Genus: Anacardium
- Species: A. excelsum

Binomial name
- Anacardium excelsum (Bertero & Balb. ex Kunth) Skeels

Synonyms
- Rhinocarpus excelsus Bertero & Balb. ex Kunth; Anacardium rhinocarpus DC.

= Anacardium excelsum =

Wild cashew

Species of tree

Anacardium excelsum, the wild cashew, espavél or espavé, is a tree in the flowering plant family Anacardiaceae. The tree is common in the tropical and subtropical dry broadleaf forests of Pacific and Atlantic watersheds of Central and South America, extending as far north as Guatemala and south into Ecuador.

== Description ==
This large evergreen tree grows along riverbanks, reaching heights of up to 48 m (157 ft), with a straight, rose-hued trunk reaching 3 m (9.8 ft) in diameter. The leaves are simple, alternate, oval-shaped, 15–30 cm (5.9–11.8 in) long and 5–12 cm (2.0–4.7 in) broad. The flowers are produced in a panicle up to 35 cm (14 in) long, each flower small, pale green to white. Older flowers turn pink and develop a strong clove-like fragrance.

The fruit is a 2–3 cm (0.79–1.18 in) long, kidney-shaped drupe. Maturation occurs in March, April, and May.

== Taxonomy ==
The wild cashew is a closely related species within the same genus as the cashew (Anacardium occidentale).

== Ecology ==
Fruit-eating bats pick the fruit of the wild cashew and transport it to their feeding places, where they eat only the fleshy part. The nuts are dropped into the leaf litter of the forest floor, where they later germinate.

== Uses ==
When uncooked, the fruit (both the nut and the surrounding fleshy part) is highly toxic to humans. It may, however, be eaten after it is roasted.
