= Iltis =

Iltis may refer to:

== People ==
- Ana S. Iltis, American philosophy professor at Wake Forest College
- Fred Iltis (1923–2008), American entomologist at San Jose State University, son of Hugo Iltis
- Hugh Iltis (1925–2016), American botanist at the University of Wisconsin–Madison, son of Hugo Iltis
- Hugo Iltis (1882–1952), Czech-American biologist and professor at Mary Washington College

== Military ==
- German torpedo boat Iltis, a 1920s German ship
- SMS Iltis, several ships of the Imperial German navy
- Volkswagen Iltis, a military vehicle

== Other ==
- Delias iltis, a butterfly
