= Teosinte (disambiguation) =

Teosintes are several wild species of grass in the genus Zea which are critical components of maize evolution.

Teosinte may also refer to:

- Zea diploperennis, the diploperennial teosinte
- Zea luxurians, a teosinte found in Guatemala, Honduras and Nicaragua
- Zea nicaraguensis, a phenotypically distinctive, threatened teosinte
- Zea perennis, the perennial teosinte
- Dioon mejiae, a species of cycad that is native to Honduras and Nicaragua

== See also ==
- Tripsacum, gamagrass, a genus of grass plants native to the Western Hemisphere
- Dioon, a genus of cycads native to Mexico and Central America
- Zamia loddigesii, a cycad native to Mexico commonly known as "teocinte"
- Zea (disambiguation)
