= Llanos de Apacunca Genetic Reserve =

Nature reserve in Nicaragua

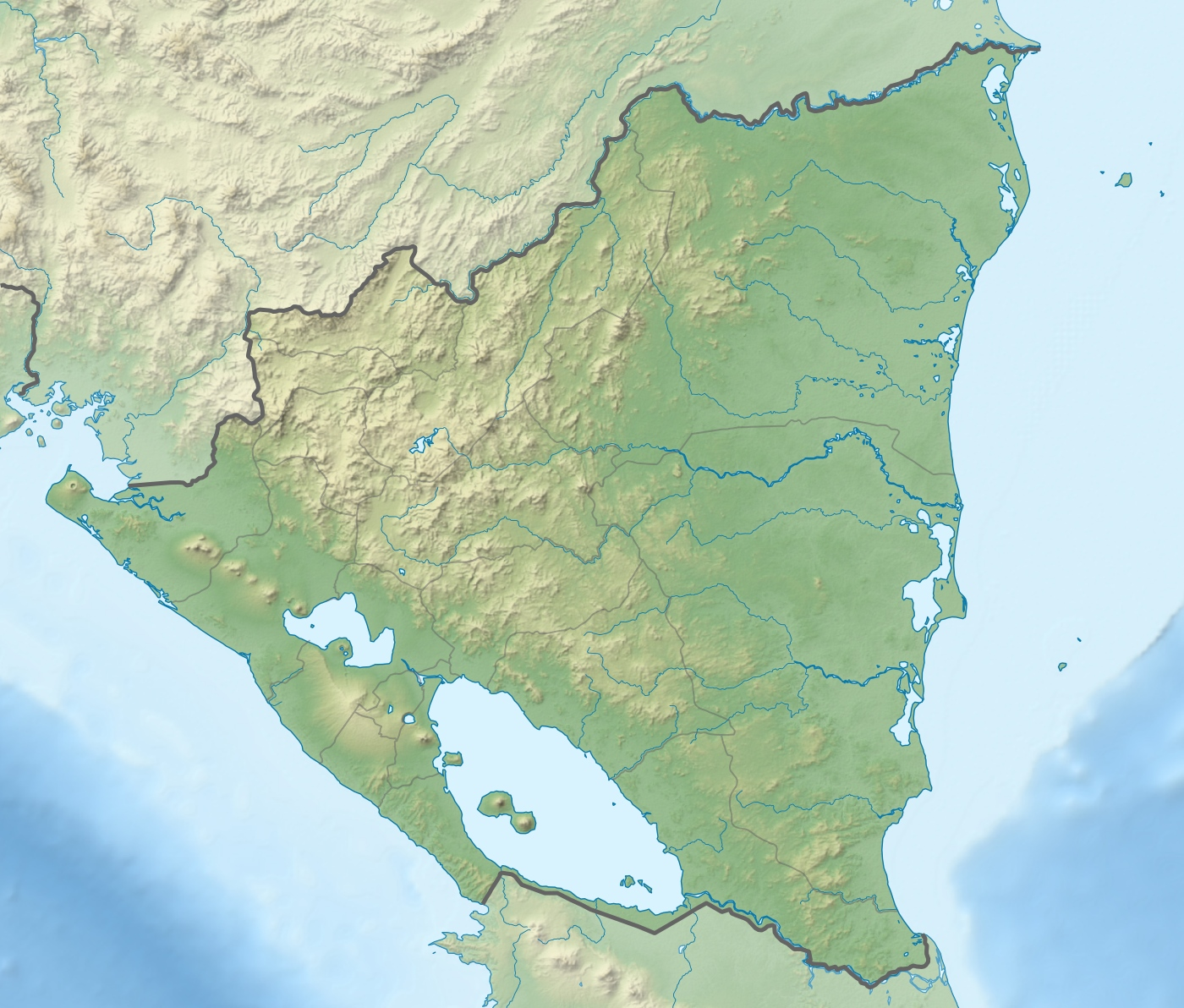
- Location within Nicaragua
- Location: Nicaragua
- Coordinates: 12°56′N 87°13′W
- Area: 81,700

Ramsar Wetland
- Reference no.: 1136

Llanos de Apacunca Genetic Reserve is a nature reserve in Nicaragua. It is one of the 78 reserves which are under official protection in the country, as a part of the Estero Real Natural Reserve.

This estuarine ecosystem is part of the mangrove systems in the Gulf of Fonseca. The area has been subject to shrimp cultivation, fishing, and agriculture. The site was declared a Reserve for Genetic Resources in 1996. 35 species of fauna have been identified. A rare species of wild maize (Zea luxurians or nicaraguensis) is endemic and only found in this area. Diversity has been impacted from sedimentation, deforestation, and other human activities. It is listed as Ramsar site 1136.

== See also ==
- Apacunca Genetic Reserve
