= Gulf of Fonseca mangroves =

Ecoregion in Central America

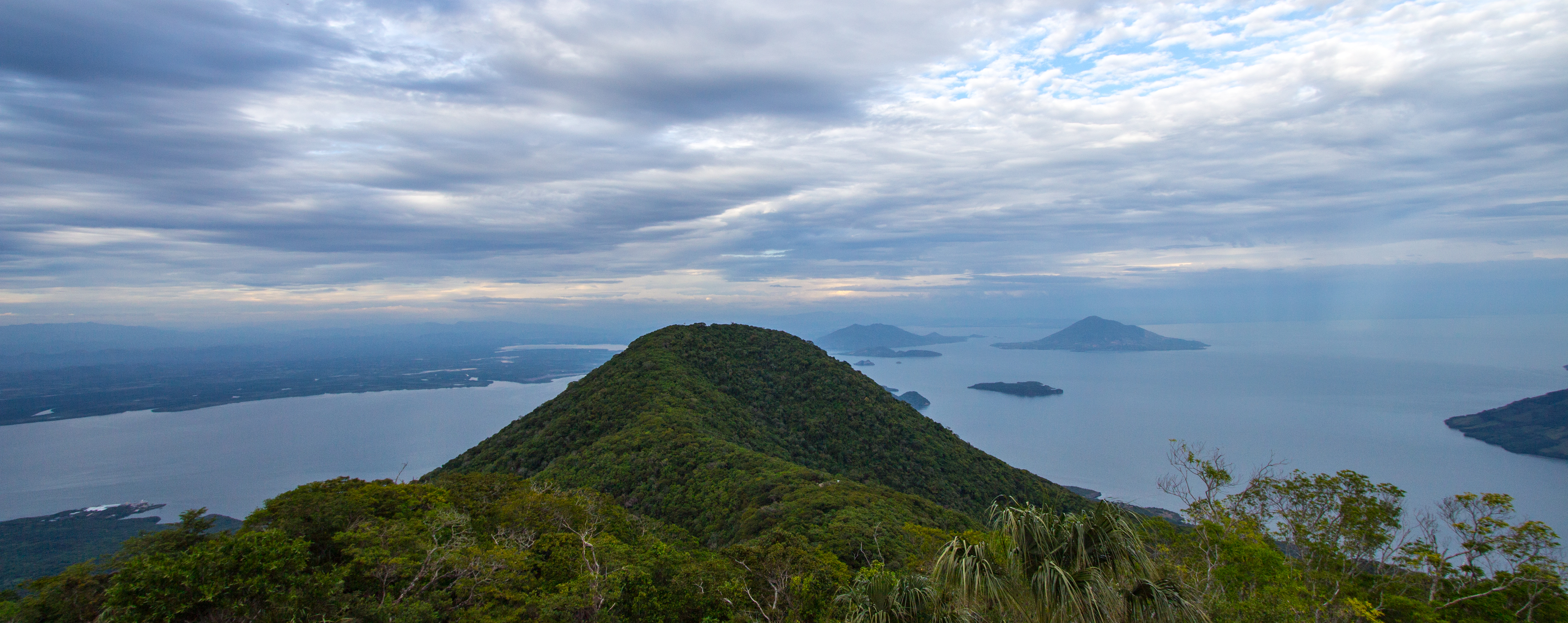
- View of Gulf of Fonseca

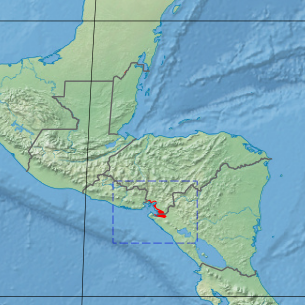
- Ecoregion territory (in red)

Ecology
- Realm: Neotropic
- Biome: Mangroves

Geography
- Area: 1,554 km^{2} (600 mi^{2})
- Country: El Salvador, Honduras, Nicaragua
- Coordinates: 13.34°N 87.61°W

The Gulf of Fonseca mangroves ecoregion (WWF ID: NT1412) covers the brackish mangrove forests around the Gulf of Fonseca on the Pacific Ocean. The Gulf is the meeting point El Salvador, Honduras, and Nicaragua. The Gulf is one of the two primary nesting sites of the critically endangered hawksbill sea turtle in the eastern Pacific. In the Honduras portion, there are seven nature reserves that collectively make up a Ramsar wetland of international importance ("Sistema de Humedales de la Zona Sur de Honduras"), providing protection for migratory birds, sea turtle, and fish.

== Location and description ==
There are a variety of habitat types on the margins of the Gulf of Fonseca - mangrove forests, mudflats, sandy beaches and rocky cliffs. The mangroves tend to line the lagoons, bays, and flat lowlands.

== Climate ==
The climate of the ecoregion is Tropical savanna climate - dry winter (Köppen climate classification (Aw)). This climate is characterized by relatively even temperatures throughout the year, and a pronounced dry season. The driest month has less than 60 mm of precipitation, and is drier than the average month.

== Flora and fauna ==
The most common mangrove tree species in the ecoregion are red mangrove (Rhizophora mangle) and Rhizophora racemosa. Associated species include Avicennia bicolor, and black mangrove (Avicennia germinans)

=== Important Bird Area ===
The mangrove habitats of the Gulf of Fonseca in Honduras, with those of La Unión Bay in El Salvador as well as the Estero Real Delta and Apacunca Plains of Nicaragua, have been designated an Important Bird Area (IBA) by BirdLife International because they support significant populations of reddish egrets, red knots, semipalmated sandpipers, elegant terns lesser ground-cuckoos, Pacific screech-owls, Hoffmann's woodpeckers, orange-fronted parakeets, Nutting's flycatchers, white-throated magpie-jays and banded wrens.

== Protected areas ==
Officially protected areas in the ecoregion include:

- Estero Padre Ramos Natural Reserve in Chinandega Department of Nicaragua
- Estero Real Natural Reserve in Chinandega Department of Nicaragua

There are also nature reserves along the inlets at Chismuyo Bay, San Lorenzo Bay, Las Iguanas and Punta Condega, Jicarito, and San Bernardo.
