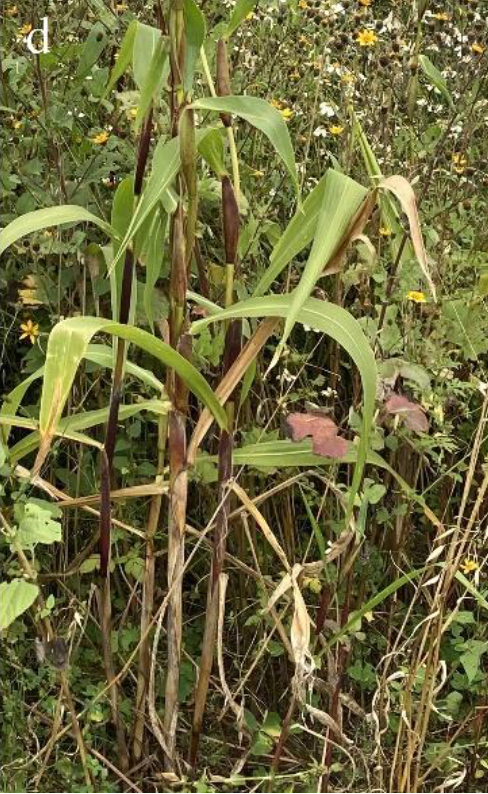

Conservation status
- Critically Endangered (IUCN 3.1)

Scientific classification
- Kingdom: Plantae
- Clade: Tracheophytes
- Clade: Angiosperms
- Clade: Monocots
- Clade: Commelinids
- Order: Poales
- Family: Poaceae
- Subfamily: Panicoideae
- Genus: Zea
- Species: Z. perennis

Binomial name
- Zea perennis (Hitchc.) Reeves & Mangelsd. 1942

= Zea perennis =

Species of grass

Zea perennis, the perennial teosinte, is a true grass species in the genus Zea and a teosinte.

== Taxonomy ==
It is one of the two perennial species in the genus Zea. The other perennial, Z. diploperennis, is the sister taxon of Z. perennis. Those two species also form a clade with Z. luxurians. Together, the three species make up the Luxuriantes section in the genus Zea. Z. perennis is the sole tetraploid in the genus and fertile hybrids with diploid Zea species are rare. Ribosomal ITS evidence suggested introgression between Z. perennis and Z. mays that must have come from either crossing the ploidy barrier or been from the diploid ancestral pool. Z. perennis is generally considered to be an autotetraploid from some ancestral population of Z. diploperennis.

== Agriculture ==
Due to the economic importance of maize, significant scientific interest exists in using the genes of the other Zea species for crop improvement. Z. perennis is of particular interest because of the potential for maize to become a perennial crop. However, difficulty in using genes from Z. perennis in Z. mays mays for crop improvement has occurred because the genes used often contain unwanted teosinte traits. Z. perennis is tropical and not winter hardy, which has led to problems in using its genes to make a perennial form of maize. To overcome this, breeding efforts have focused on deeper rhizomes that can survive below the frost line.
