= John Doebley =

American geneticist

- Education: West Chester State College, Eastern New Mexico University, University of Wisconsin–Madison (Ph.D.)
- Known for: Research on the genetics of maize domestication.
- Scientific career
- Fields: Plant genetics
- Institutions: North Carolina State University, Texas A&M University, University of Minnesota, University of Wisconsin–Madison
- Doctoral advisor: Hugh Iltis

John F. Doebley is an American plant geneticist whose main area of interest is how genes drive plant development and evolution. He has spent the last two decades examining the genetic differences and similarities between teosinte and maize and has cloned the major genes that cause the visible differences between these two very different plants.

He was part of the team that is credited with first finding, in 2002, that maize had been domesticated only once, about 9000 years ago, and then spread throughout the Americas.

John Doebley began his undergraduate education as a biology major at West Chester State College (now West Chester University) in West Chester, Pennsylvania. However, after taking a class by a particularly interesting lecturer, he decided to switch his major to anthropology.

After he graduated with a degree in anthropology in 1974, he entered a master's programme in anthropology at Eastern New Mexico University in Portales. Upon completion of this degree in 1976, he began a PhD programme at the University of Wisconsin–Madison. Here he worked with botany professor Hugh Iltis, travelling to Mexico to collect teosinte. Doebley published three papers on this research for his doctoral thesis and completed his degree in 1980.

Doebley then held two postdoctoral positions successively at North Carolina State University under the mentorship of Major Goodman and Ronald Sederoff, and began a research group at Texas A&M University.

In 1987, Doebley took up the position of professor at the University of Minnesota, St. Paul, where his group focused on pinpointing and cloning the principal genes involved in the evolution of maize, such as teosinte branched1, which controls branch number, and teosinte glume architecture, which controls the (lack of) casing on kernels.

In 1999, Doebley returned to the University of Wisconsin–Madison as a professor. There he has continued his work on teosinte and maize. From 2015 he is serving as the chair of the Laboratory of Genetics, which includes the School of Medicine and Public Health’s Department of Medical Genetics and the College of Agriculture and Life Sciences' Department of Genetics.

Doebley’s work has earned him widespread recognition in the field of complex trait genetics, and he was elected to the National Academy of Sciences in 2002.
