= Zea =

Zea may refer to:

== Nature ==
- Zea (plant), a genus of large grasses, including:
  - Zea mays, commonly known as maize or corn
- Zea (skipper), a genus of butterflies
- Helicoverpa zea, the corn earworm, a major agricultural pest
- ZEA, an abbreviation for the mycotoxin zearalenone

== People and places ==
- Zea (surname), a surname
- Zea (singer), a Slovak singer
- Zea (island), an island of the Cyclades archipelago
- Bay of Zea, one of the harbours of Piraeus in Athens, Greece
  - Zea Harbour Project, a Danish-Greek archaeological project

== Other uses ==
- Zea (Bread), a Greek bread made from farro or "zea," as it is known in Greek.
- Zea (EP), a 1993 alternative EP from dEUS
- Zea (film), a 1981 short film
- ZE:A, a South Korean boy band
- zea, the language code abbreviation for Zeelandic, a West Flemish dialect of Dutch

== See also ==
- Teosinte (disambiguation)
