= Nedda Friberti =

Italian mathematician (born 1913)

- Born: 13 September 1913; Trieste, Italy
- Known for: Jewish refugee during WWII fleeing Nazi occupation of Italy
- Scientific career
- Fields: Mathematics

Nedda Friberti (born 13 September 1913, date of death unknown) was an Italian Jewish mathematician who fled Italy as a result of the German occupation of the Italian Socialist Republic during World War II. She was denied entry into the United States by the Emergency Committee in Aid of Displaced Foreign Scholars. In 1939, she was able to flee to Switzerland to escape persecution.

== Biography ==
Friberti was born in Trieste in 1913. She received a double degree in Mathematics and Physics. She worked as an assistant professor of Mathematics and Geometry at the Technical Institute Leonardo da Vinci in 1937.

Before teaching mathematics Friberti worked at the Geophysical Institute of the Royal Italian Talassografic Committee (Council of Italy).

In 1939 Friberti applied for migration into the United States by submitting an application for the Emergency Committee in Aid of Displaced Foreign Scholars. Thousands of scholars, including 80 female scientists and mathematicians, applied to this committee during the second World War. Friberti's application was denied by the committee because it was deemed that she would not have an easy time finding a new job in the United States.

Ultimately, Friberti escaped to Switzerland.
