= Zea nicaraguensis =

Scientific classification
- Kingdom: Plantae
- Clade: Tracheophytes
- Clade: Angiosperms
- Clade: Monocots
- Clade: Commelinids
- Order: Poales
- Family: Poaceae
- Subfamily: Panicoideae
- Genus: Zea
- Species: Z. nicaraguensis

Binomial name
- Zea nicaraguensis H.H.Iltis and B.F. Benz 2000

Species of grass

Zea nicaraguensis is an annual, true grass species in the genus Zea. It is considered to be phenotypically the most distinctive, as well as the most threatened teosinte. This teosinte thrives in flooded conditions along 200 m of a coastal estuarine river in northwest Nicaragua at the Reserva Natural de Apacunca. Virtually all populations of teosinte are either threatened or endangered with Z. nicaraguensis being the most endangered, it survives as about 6000 plants in an area of 200 x 150 m. The Mexican and Nicaraguan governments have taken action in recent years to protect wild teosinte populations, using both in situ and ex situ conservation methods. Currently, a large amount of scientific interest exists in conferring beneficial teosinte traits, such as insect resistance, perennialism, and flood tolerance, to cultivated maize lines, although this is very difficult due to linked deleterious teosinte traits.
