= Scholar Rescue Fund =

The Institute of International Education Scholar Rescue Fund (IIE-SRF) arranges, funds, and supports fellowships for threatened and displaced scholars at partnering higher education institutions worldwide, including inside their home regions. These fellowships permit professors, researchers and other senior academics to find temporary refuge at host universities and colleges anywhere in the world, enabling them to pursue their academic work. In some cases, conditions may improve, but if the scholar is unable to return home, the scholar may use the fellowship period to identify a longer-term opportunity.

== History ==
The Institute of International Education has helped rescue threatened scholars since its inception in 1919, demonstrating a commitment to protecting academic freedom. In the 1930s, IIE was instrumental in founding the Emergency Committee in Aid of Displaced Foreign Scholars, led by Edward R. Murrow. The program assisted scholars who were barred from teaching, persecuted and threatened with imprisonment by the Nazis. Over 300 scholars were received aid, some of whom became Nobel Laureates and many whose work and ideas helped shape the post-war world.

Other major activities undertaken throughout the Institute's history, before the formal establishment of IIE-SRF in 2002, include: The Russian Student Fund (1920-1949), Rescue of Scholars from Fascist Italy (1922-1924), Rescue of Scholars from the Spanish Civil War (1936-1939), Committee on Awards for Chinese Students (1942-1945), Emergency Program to Aid Hungarian University Students (in cooperation with World University Service) (1956-1958), The South African Education Program (1979-1992), Rescue of Burmese Refugees (1990-1992), and Emergency Higher Education Load Programs (HELP) (1998-2000).

=== Scholar Rescue Fund launch ===
IIE-SRF was founded and endowed in 2002, when IIE's trustees committed to making scholar rescue a permanent part of its work. As of 2023, IIE-SRF has provided over 1,700 awards with the collaboration of over 480 institutions from 55 different countries. The IIE-SRF Fellowships have no geographic limits on awards, on the disciplines, or fields supported. Fellowships may be awarded to scholars from any country and/or institutions.

=== Regional Initiatives ===
==== Afghanistan ====
In response to the disruptions to higher education caused by the 2021 Taliban offensive, IIE launched its Afghanistan Crisis Response that included IIE-SRF and other programs to assist impacted scholars and students. As of September 2023, IIE-SRF has made emergency awards to 56 scholars from Afghanistan.

==== Iraq ====
In 2006, due to high security concerns in Iraq, IIE-SRF launched the Iraq Scholar Rescue Project. The Project helped Iraqi university professors and scientists from 2007-2014 to resume their teaching and research in safety. By the Project's completion in September 2014, over 280 Iraqi scholars had received fellowships to help them resume their teaching and research activities in safe countries.

The Iraq Project continued through January 2023 through the Iraq Distance Learning Initiative, which included the Iraq Live Lecture Project and the IIE-SRF University Joint Courses Project. Both projects supported Iraqi scholars in the diaspora to fill curricular and expertise gaps at Iraqi universities, thus strengthening connections between these scholars and university students, professors, and institutions of higher education inside Iraq.

==== Syria ====
Due to the Syrian Civil War, ongoing since 2011, an estimated 2,000 university professionals have been displaced. Universities have been shut down or had their budgets decimated. As of September 2023, IIE-SRF has awarded fellowships to 110 Syrian scholars, among hundreds of applicants.

==== Ukraine ====
The 2022 Russian invasion of Ukraine endangered the lives and careers of scholars in both Ukraine and Russia. As of March 2023, IIE-SRF has awarded fellowships to 13 Ukrainians and 9 Russians.

==== Yemen ====
The Yemeni civil war (2014–present) resulted in a humanitarian and academic crisis. In 2022, one quarter of all applications received were from Yemeni scholars, more than an other country. As of September 2023, IIE-SRF has awarded 158 fellowships to 91 Yemeni scholars, partnering with 43 host institutions in 13 countries. Many of the fellows found academic placements in their home region, including in Egypt, Jordan and Iraqi Kurdistan.

=== IIE-SRF Alliance ===
The IIE-SRF Alliance was launched in August 2020 as a worldwide network of individuals and organizations from across the higher education, scientific, non-profit, corporate, and governmental sectors that partner with IIE-SRF to offer practical support to scholars in need. This support includes temporary academic positions, professional development and career advancement opportunities, and other critical assistance.

=== Related Programs at IIE ===
In recent years, IIE launched several other crisis response programs and initiatives to meet the needs of students, scholars, and artists facing threats and emergencies. The Emergency Student Fund (ESF) was started in 2010 to provide micro grants to international students in the United States impacted by crises or natural disasters. The Artist Protection fund was founded in 2015 originally as an extension of the Scholar Rescue Fund to provide fellowship grants to threatened artists from any field of practice. The Platform for Education in Emergencies Response (IIE-Peer) was launched in 2017 as an online clearinghouse to connect displaced and refugee students with educational opportunities so they may continue formal and informal higher education. The Odyssey Scholarship was started in 2021 to support higher education opportunities for traditionally under-served, displaced students around the globe, including refugee students.
