= Fritz Reiche =

German physicist

- Born: July 4, 1883; Berlin, Germany
- Died: January 14, 1969 (aged 85)
- Education: Ludwig-Maximilians-Universität München, Friedrich Wilhelm University of Berlin
- Occupations: physicist, professor
- Years active: 1913–1969
- Known for: quantum mechanics, supersonic flow
- Notable work: The Quantum Theory

Fritz Reiche (4 July 1883 in Berlin, Germany – 14 January 1969) was a German physicist, a student of Max Planck and a colleague of Albert Einstein, who was active in, and made important contributions to the early development of quantum mechanics including co-authoring the Thomas-Reiche-Kuhn sum rule.

Fritz Reiche was born in 1883 in Berlin, Germany. In 1901 and 1902, he attended the Ludwig-Maximilians-Universität München, and from 1902 to 1907, he attended the Friedrich Wilhelm University of Berlin, where he received his PhD. From 1913 to 1920, as a Privatdozent, he worked and taught under Planck in Berlin. Reiche published more than 55 scientific papers and books including The Quantum Theory.

He became a professor in 1921 at the University of Breslau but was dismissed from his academic position in 1933 due to being Jewish. Eventually, with the help of Ladenburg, Einstein, and the Emergency Committee in Aid of Displaced Foreign Scholars, Reiche immigrated to the United States with his family in 1941 and later went on to work with NASA and the United States Navy on projects related to supersonic flow.
