= Arnold Dodel-Port =

Swiss botanist (1843–1908)

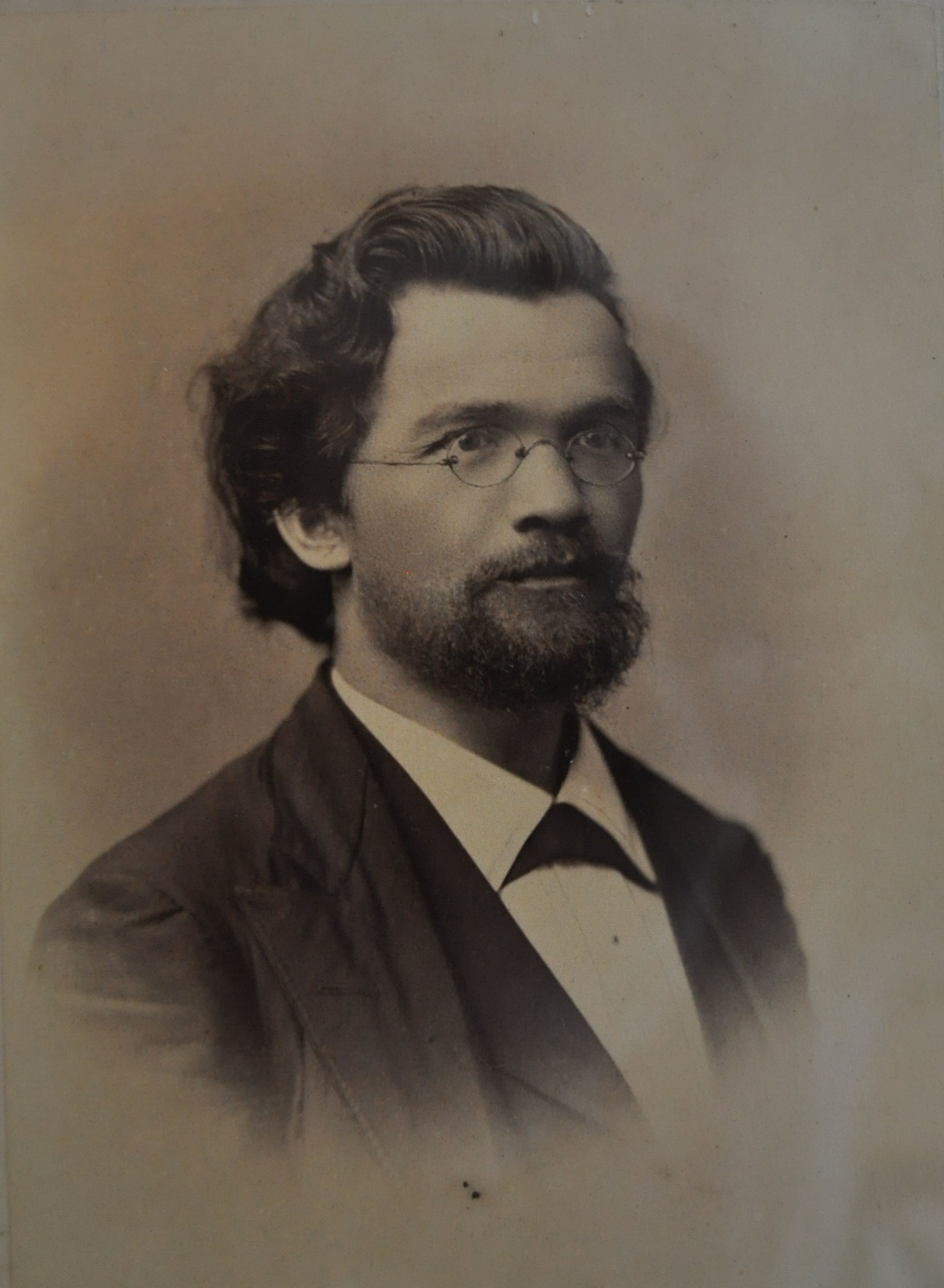
Arnold Dodel-Port

Arnold Dodel-Port (16 October 1843, Affeltrangen – 11 April 1908, Zurich) was a Swiss botanist and forceful advocate of Darwin's evolutionary theory.

He studied biology at the University of Geneva, at the Federal Polytechnic School in Zurich and at the Ludwig-Maximilians-Universität München. In 1869, he received his doctorate from the University of Freiburg. In 1870, he obtained his habilitation at the University of Zurich, where from 1883 to 1903, he served as a full professor of botany. At the University of Zurich, he founded a botanical microscopy laboratory.

He was a freethinker and socialist, published works to further the cause of Darwinian evolution, and became one of the most prominent popularizers of science in the German-language realm. During his lifetime, he maintained correspondence with Charles Darwin and Ernst Haeckel. One of his students was Hugo Iltis.

== Works ==
- Die neuere Schopfungsgechichte nach dem gegenwarligen Stande der Naturwissenschaft, 1875 – The recent creation story in regard to the present state of science.
- Anatomisch-physiologischer Atlas der Botanik für Hoch- und Mittelschulen (with Carolina Dodel), 1878 – Anatomical-physiological atlas of botany for upper and middle schools.
- Biologische Fragmente: Beiträge zur Entwicklungsgeschichte der Pflanzen, 1885 – Biological fragments: contributions to the developmental history of plants.
- Konrad Deubler. Tagebücher, Biographie und Briefwechsel des oberösterreichischen Bauernphilosophen, 1886 – Konrad Deubler; Diary, biography and correspondence of the Upper Austrian peasant philosopher.
- Moses oder Darwin? Eine Schulfrage. Allen Freunden der Wahrbeit zum Nachdenken vorgelegt, 1889; later translated into English as: "Moses or Darwin? : a school problem for all friends of truth and progress" (1891).
- Aus Leben und Wissenschaft; gesammelte Vorträge und Aufsätze, 1896 – Of life and science; collected lectures and essays.
- Ernst Haeckel als Erzieher, 1906 – Ernst Haeckel as an educator.

== Sources ==
- Andreas Daum, Wissenschaftspopularisierung im 19. Jahrhundert: Bürgerliche Kultur, naturwissenschaftliche Bildung und die deutsche Öffentlichkeit, 1848–1914. Munich: Oldenbourg, 1998, ISBN 3-486-56337-8 ("Popularizing Science in the 19th Century", second ed. 2002).
- Werner Beyl, Arnold Dodel (1843–1908) und die Popularisierung des Darwinismus. 1984 – Arnold Dodel and the popularization of Darwinism.
- Hugo Iltis: "Arnold Dodel, Leben und Werk eines sozialistischen Naturforschers", 1925 (?)
