= Fred Iltis =

American entomologist

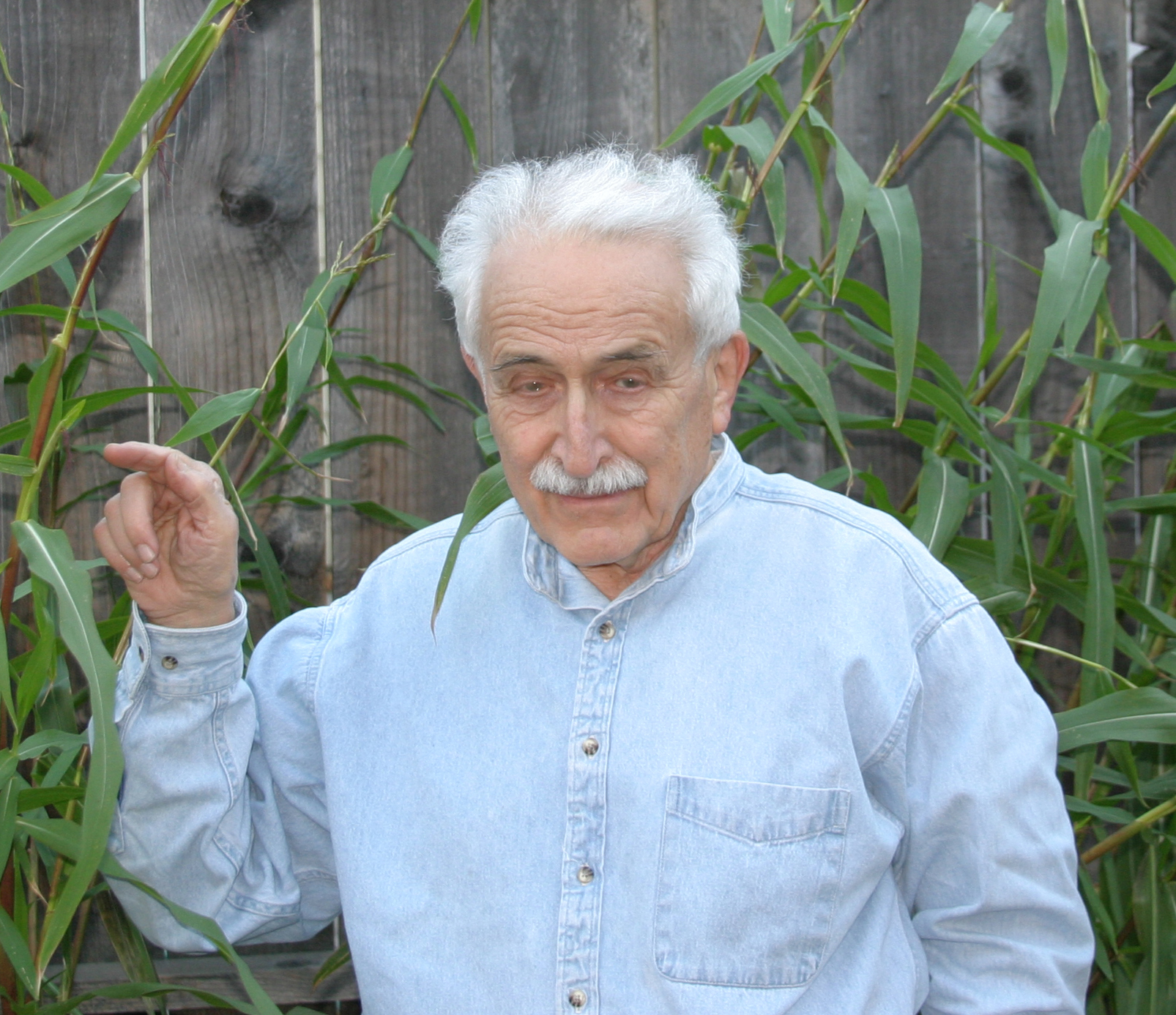
- Fred Iltis with Zea diploperennis in 2005
- Born: Wilfred Gregor Iltis; April 20, 1923; Brno, Czechoslovakia
- Died: December 11, 2008 (aged 85); San Jose, California
- Education: Western Kentucky State Teachers College; University of California, Davis
- Scientific career
- Fields: Entomology
- Workplaces: Harvard School of Public Health; San Jose State University

Fred Iltis (April 20, 1923 – December 11, 2008) was an American entomologist. His research focused on the biosystematics and life cycle of mosquitoes.

== Life and work ==
Wilfred Gregor Iltis was born on April 20, 1923, in Brno, Czechoslovakia, to Anni (née Liebscher) and Hugo Iltis, a botanist and geneticist who was a life sciences teacher at the German-language secondary school of Brno. His father was also the first biographer of Gregor Mendel and a vocal opponent of Nazi "racial science". In the fall of 1938, the Iltis family was granted visas to enter the United States thanks to the intercession of the Emergency Committee in Aid of Displaced Foreign Scholars, along with affidavits of endorsement from Albert Einstein and Franz Boas. In January 1939, when Hitler's military was preparing the invasion of Czechoslovakia, fifteen-year-old Wilfred escaped with his mother and his younger brother Hugh on a harrowing train ride that traversed Nazi Germany to France. During a midnight stop at the Stuttgart station, Gestapo officers combed the train, removing ten passengers; the Iltises survived because the boys pretended to be asleep while their mother bluffed that she was the wife of a French diplomat. In Cherbourg, they were joined by Hugo Iltis and boarded the passenger ship RMS Aquitania for the Atlantic crossing. They settled in Fredericksburg, Virginia, where Hugo Iltis was soon appointed to a professorship in biology at Mary Washington College.

Fred Iltis began his undergraduate studies in 1941 at George Washington University but after one semester transferred to Western Kentucky State Teachers College, pursuing a major in agriculture.

During World War II, Iltis served in the Army in the South Pacific for two and a half years. He was a private first class and sanitary technician in malaria control and was in the battles of the Northern Solomons, South Philippines, and Luzon. He was awarded the Asiatic–Pacific Campaign Medal with 3 bronze stars, the Philippine Liberation Medal with one bronze star, the Good Conduct Medal, and the Victory Medal.

In 1948, he married Julia Patricia Zrinyi (Judy) (1926–2004), a graphic artist and scientific illustrator. He went on to earn a Ph.D. in entomology at University of California, Davis.

Iltis worked briefly at Harvard in 1967–1968 as a research fellow in Tropical Public Health for the Harvard School of Public Health. After settling in San Jose, California, in the 1960s, Iltis taught in the Biology Department at San José State University.

A skilled photographer, Iltis developed and printed photos in a basement darkroom, using the slow and complicated archival process system yielding prints that last many decades. In his journeys south of the border (where he met the Mexican photographer Manuel Álvarez Bravo), Iltis portrayed the life of the Mexican Indians, particularly in Michoacán. Many photos of his vast archive document the civil rights movement of the 1960s, student protests against the Vietnam War, the struggle of the Chicano agricultural workers led by César Chávez and Dolores Huerta, as well as the strikes and boycott of American fruit companies. He met and befriended the renowned photojournalists Hansel Mieth and Otto Hagel, who had documented the Great Depression of the 1930s in Life magazine. From them Iltis learned that "a photo can express one’s ideas and ideals far better than a thousand words".

Iltis died on December 11, 2008, in San Jose, California, at the age of 85.

== Publications ==
- Iltis, Wilfred Gregor. "Biosystematics of the Culex pipiens complex in Northern California, Davis, California, 1966." Ph.D. diss., University of California, Davis, 1977.

== Literature ==
- Daniele Ravenna, Felix Humm, Fred Iltis. Biologist, Photographer and Friend, Milano, DR&C Editore, 2009. ISBN 978-88-904465-0-4.
