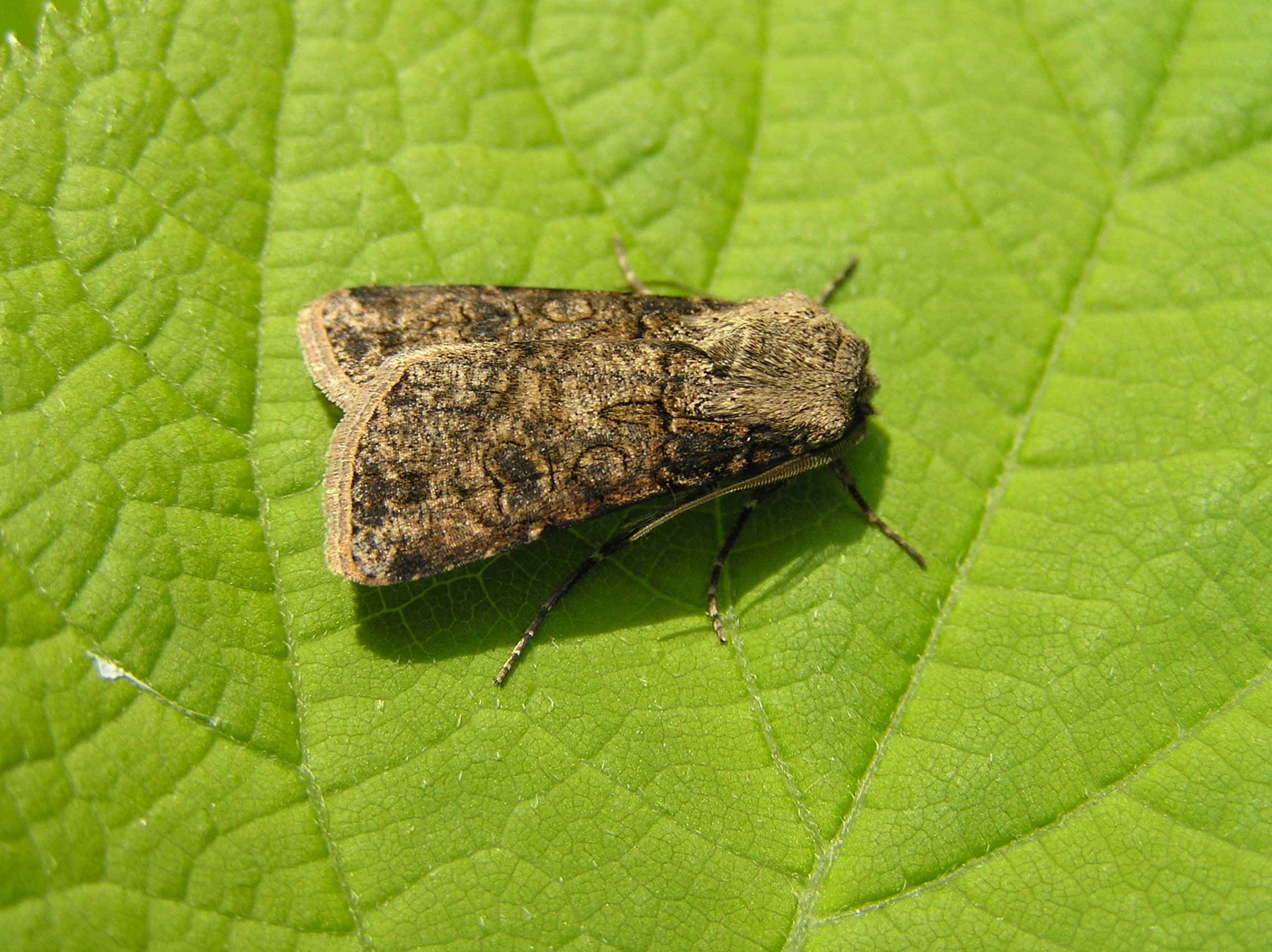

Conservation status
- Least Concern (IUCN 3.1) (Europe regional assessment)

Scientific classification
- Kingdom: Animalia
- Phylum: Arthropoda
- Clade: Pancrustacea
- Class: Insecta
- Order: Lepidoptera
- Superfamily: Noctuoidea
- Family: Noctuidae
- Genus: Agrotis
- Species: A. clavis

Binomial name
- Agrotis clavis (Hufnagel, 1766)

Synonyms
- Euxoa corticea

= Agrotis clavis =

Species of moth

Agrotis clavis (also known as the heart and club) is a moth of the family Noctuidae. It is distributed throughout the Palearctic realm.

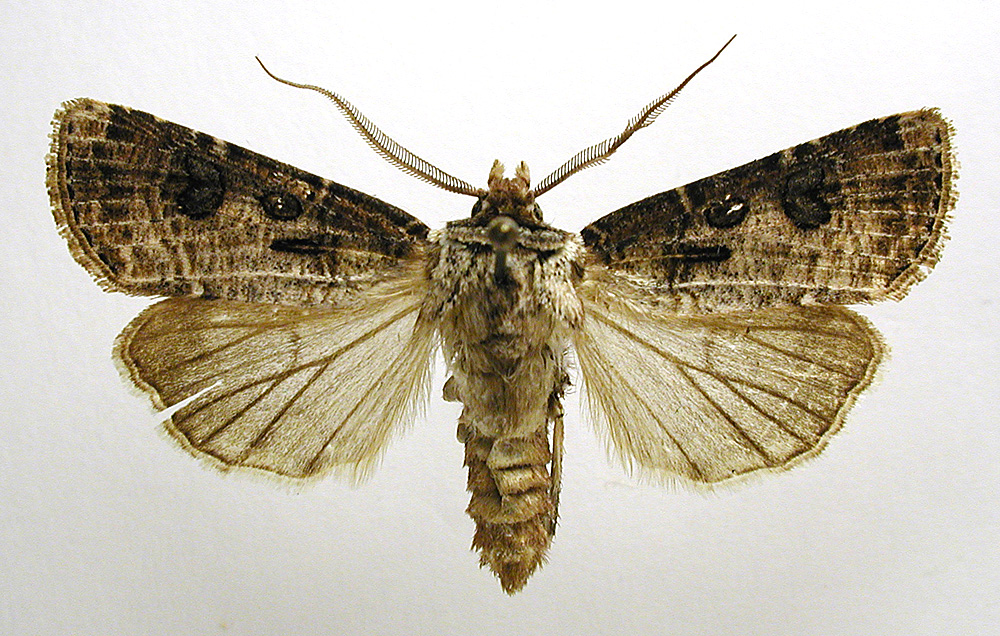
Mounted

The common name of this species refers to the supposed shapes of the bold dark stigmata on the usually pale forewings. In this species all the stigmata have a rounded shape, contrasting with the elongated claviform stigmata of the much commoner heart and dart. The hindwings are grey, usually much darker than in heart and dart and turnip moth. The differences are not consistent however; they are highly variable in both colour and markings, and identification of atypical or worn examples may prove impossible without examination of genitalia.See Townsend et al. The wingspan is 35–40 mm. The main habitat is calcareous grassland. The moth flies at night in June and July and is attracted to light and sugar.

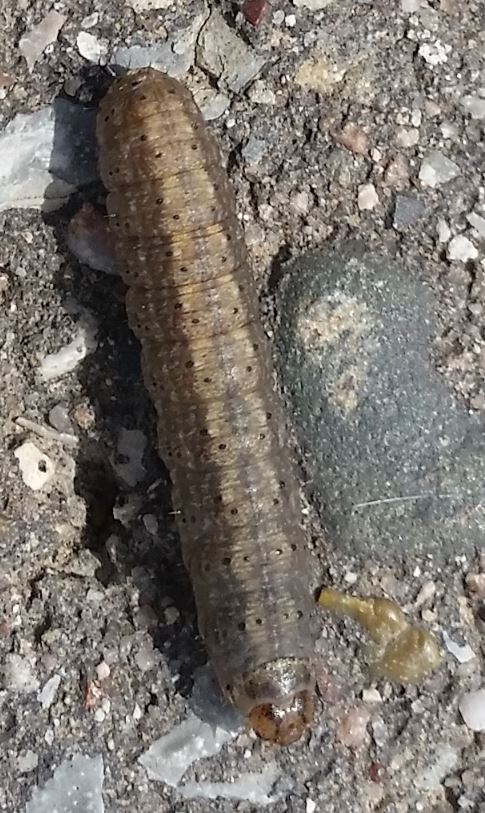
larva

The larva, which is dark brown with a pattern of black dots in its final instar, feeds on a variety of herbaceous plants (see list below). The young larva feeds on the leaves of the food plant, later feeding on the roots. It overwinters as a full-grown larva in a cavity in the soil before pupating in the spring.

1. The flight season refers to the British Isles. This may vary in other parts of the range depending on the weather.

== Recorded host plants ==
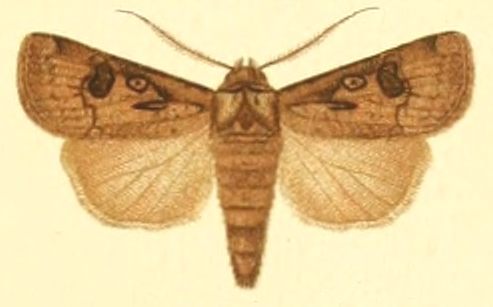
Illustrated male

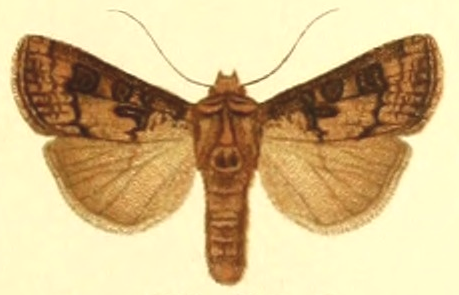
Illustrated female

- Brassica oleracea
- Chenopodium - goosefoot
- Lactuca - lettuce
- Polygonum - knotgrass
- Rumex
- Spinacia - spinach
- Trifolium - clover
- Zea - maize

Full list at reference.

== Subspecies ==
- A. c. clavis - Europe
- A. c. corsa - Corsica
