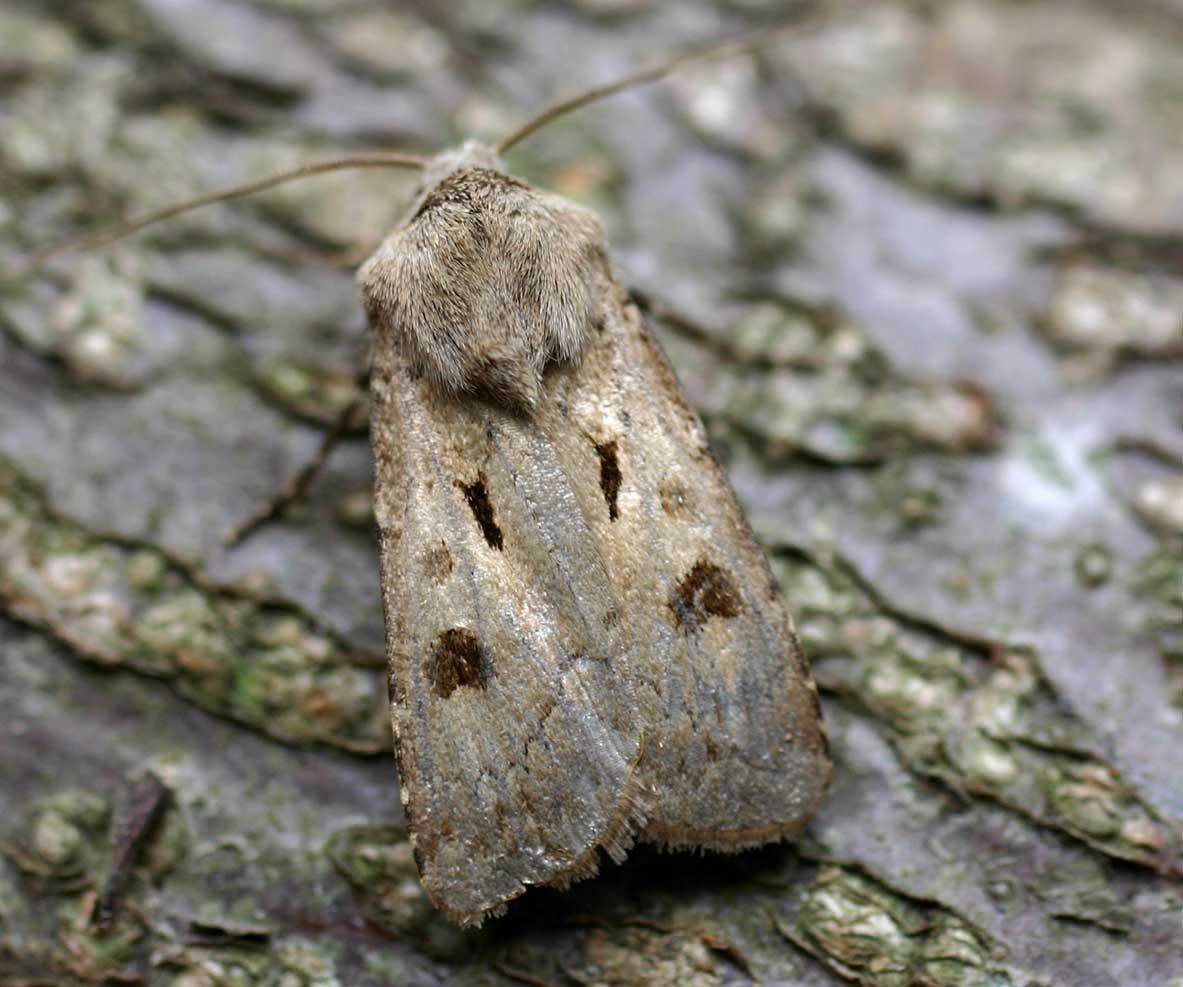

Scientific classification
- Kingdom: Animalia
- Phylum: Arthropoda
- Class: Insecta
- Order: Lepidoptera
- Superfamily: Noctuoidea
- Family: Noctuidae
- Genus: Agrotis
- Species: A. exclamationis

Binomial name
- Agrotis exclamationis (Linnaeus, 1758)

Synonyms
- Euxoa exclaimationis; Euxoa serena

= Heart and dart =

Species of moth

The heart and dart (Agrotis exclamationis) is a moth of the family Noctuidae. The species was first described by Carl Linnaeus in his 1758 10th edition of Systema Naturae. A familiar moth to many, it is considered one of the most common of the European region. It occurs throughout the Palearctic realm from Ireland to Japan.

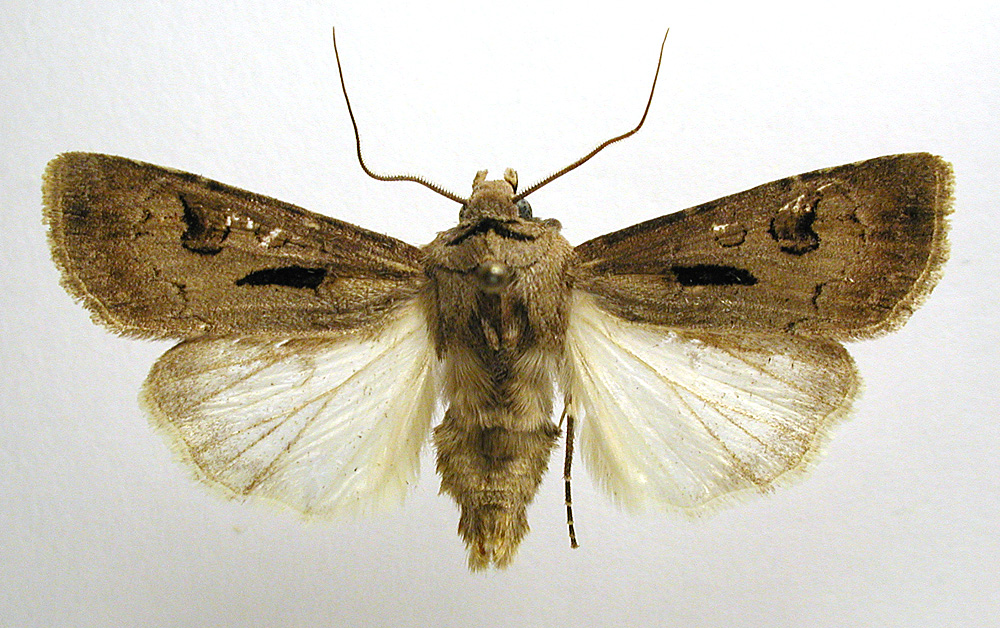
Mounted

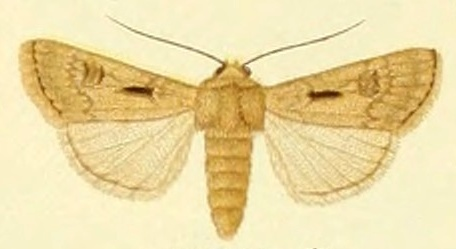
Male

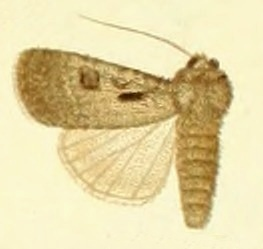
Female

This is a quite variable species with forewings ranging from pale to dark brown but always recognizable by the distinctively shaped dark stigmata which give it its common name. The wingspan is 35–44 mm. The hindwings are whitish (compared with other common Agrotis species, the hindwings of this species are usually paler than in heart and club but darker than in turnip moth). This species usually has a dark area at the front of the thorax, visible as a horizontal bar when viewing the moth head on. The differences are not consistent however; they are highly variable in both colour and markings, and identification of atypical or worn examples may prove impossible without examination of genitalia. See Townsend et al.

This moth flies at night from May to July and is attracted to light, sometimes in large numbers. It also frequently visits nectar-rich flowers such as Buddleia, ragwort and red valerian.

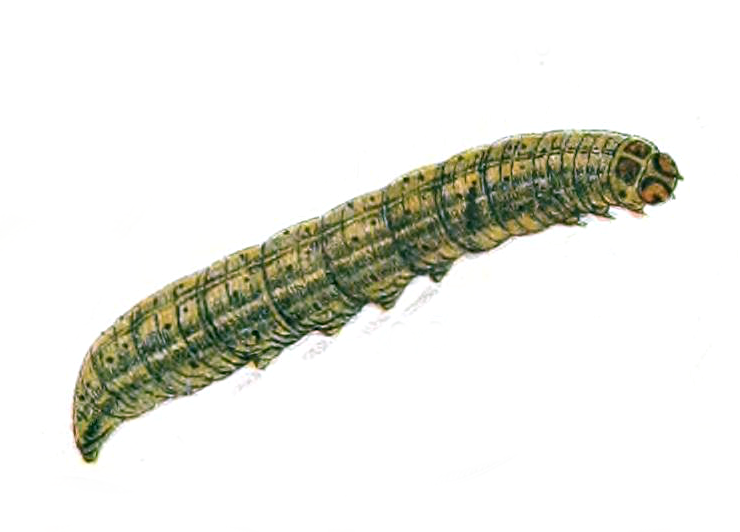
Larva

The larva The caterpillars are coloured grey-brown, paler ventrally and have a pale dorsal line and clearly recognizable black point warts.

The pupa is bright red. On the cremaster sit two short curved thorns.Larvae feed on a variety of plants, both wild and cultivated (see list below). This is one of the notorious cutworms and often severs or fatally damages plants at the base. The species overwinters as a full-grown larva in a chamber in the soil before pupating in the spring.

1. The flight season refers to the British Isles. This may vary in other parts of the range.

== Recorded host plants ==
- Anemone
- Artemisia
- Beta – beet
- Brassica rapa – turnip
- Fragaria – strawberry
- Lactuca – lettuce
- Plantago - plantain
- Polygonum
- Quercus – oak
- Rubus – bramble
- Rumex – docks, sorrels
- Solanum – potato
- Spinacia – spinach
- Stellaria
- Zea – maize

== Subspecies ==
- A. e. corsica - Corsica
- A. e. exclamationis - Europe
- A. e. informis Leech, [1889] - Japan
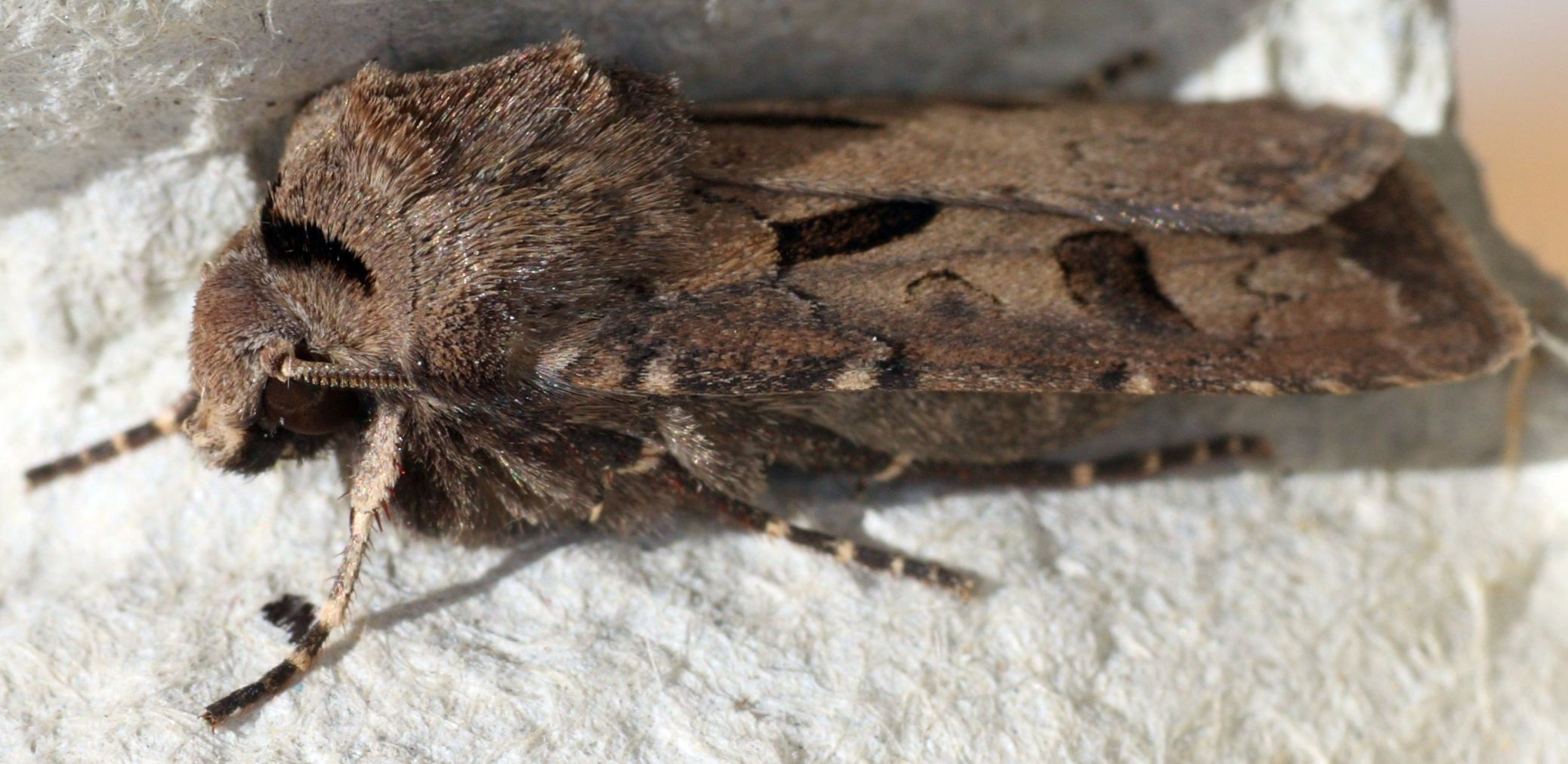
Profile

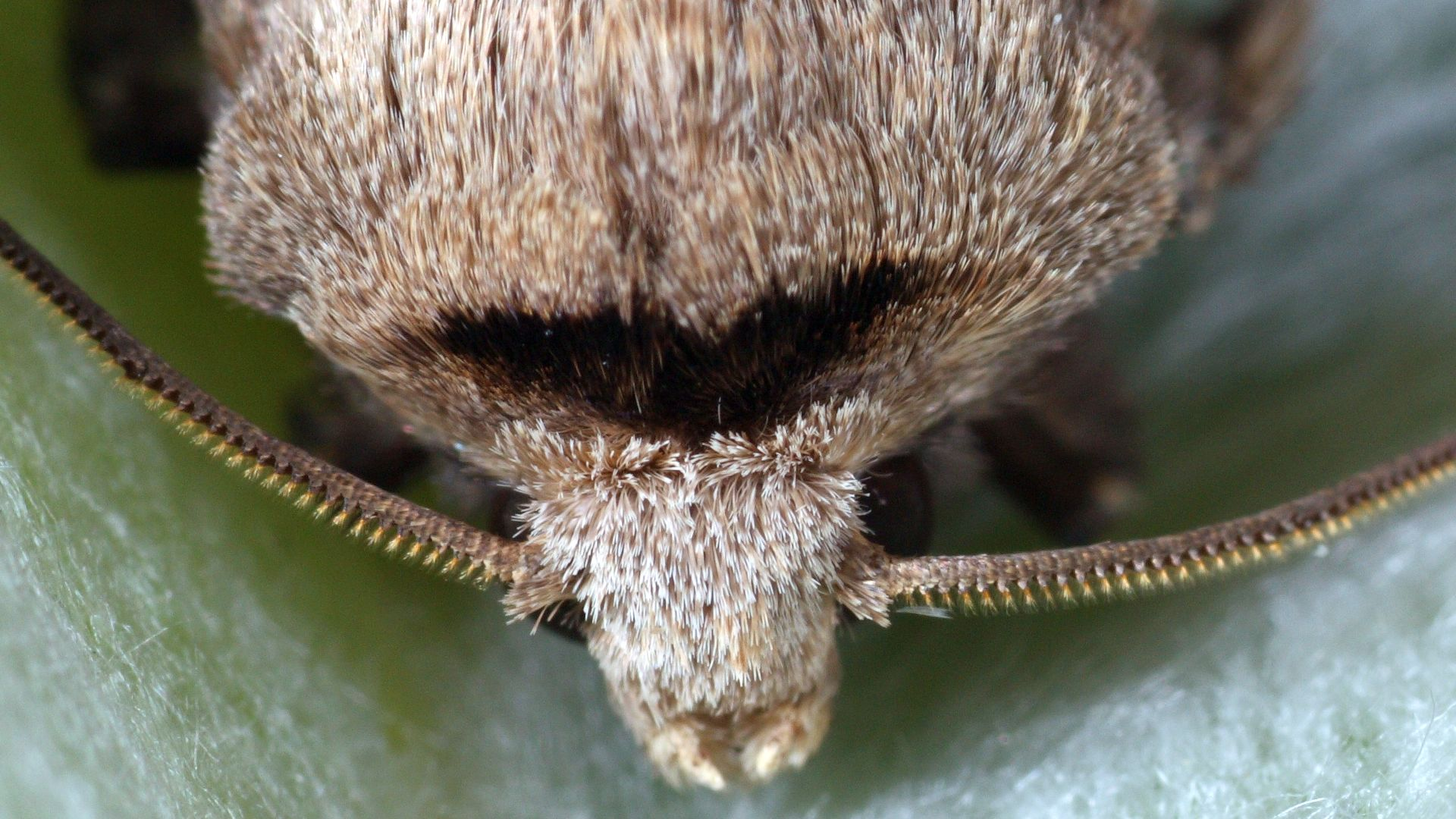
Front mark

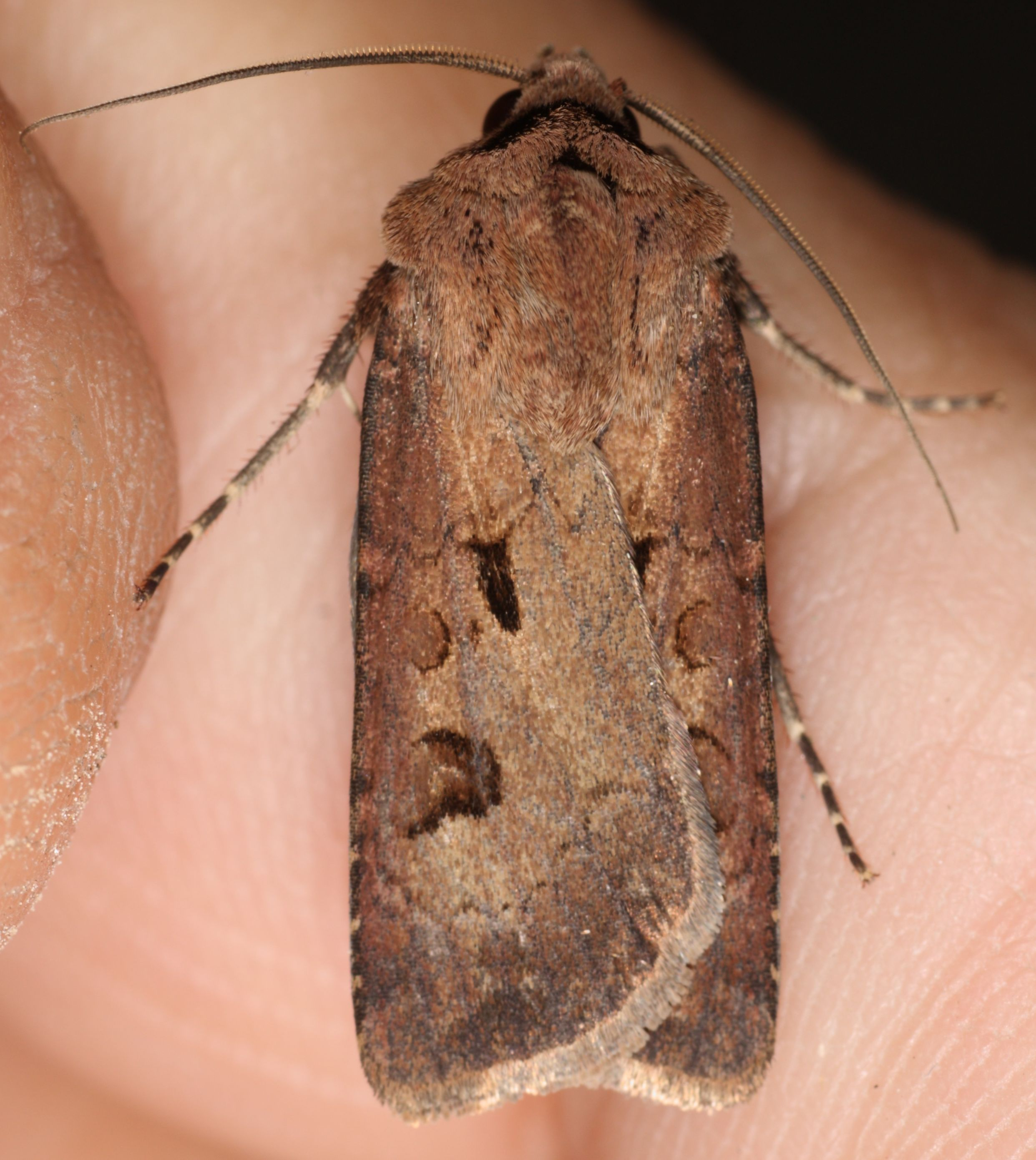
Color variation
