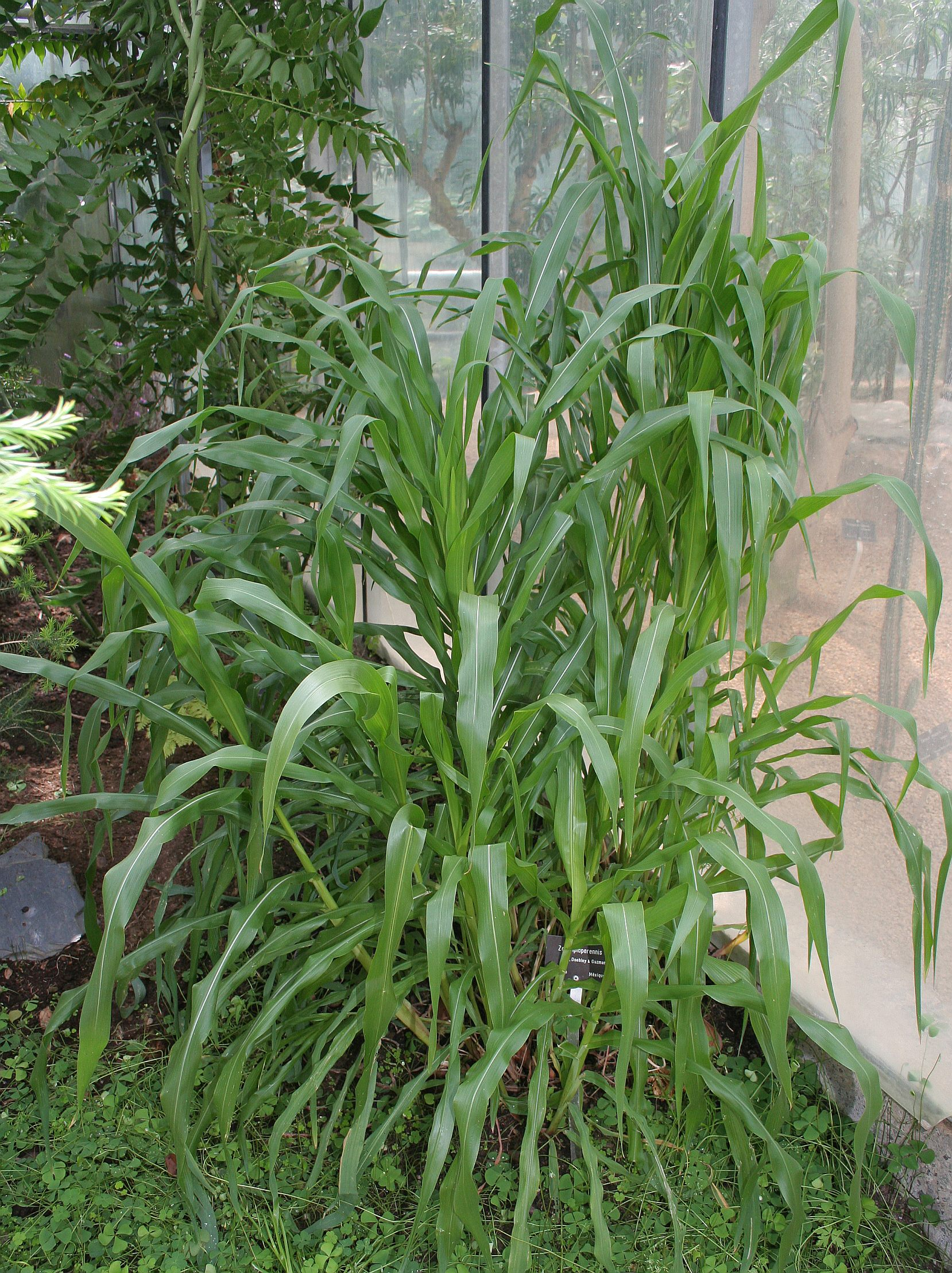
- Zea diploperennis, Conservatoire botanique national de Brest, France, June 2007

Conservation status
- Endangered (IUCN 3.1)

Scientific classification
- Kingdom: Plantae
- Clade: Tracheophytes
- Clade: Angiosperms
- Clade: Monocots
- Clade: Commelinids
- Order: Poales
- Family: Poaceae
- Subfamily: Panicoideae
- Genus: Zea
- Species: Z. diploperennis

Binomial name
- Zea diploperennis Iltis, Doebley & R.Guzmán
- It is endemic to southwest Jalisco, Mexico

Synonyms
- Zea perennis subsp. diploperennis (Iltis, Doebley & R.Guzmán) Greb.

= Zea diploperennis =

Species of grass

Zea diploperennis, the diploperennial teosinte, is a species of perennial plant in the family Poaceae endemic to southwest Jalisco, Mexico. It is endangered.

== Description ==
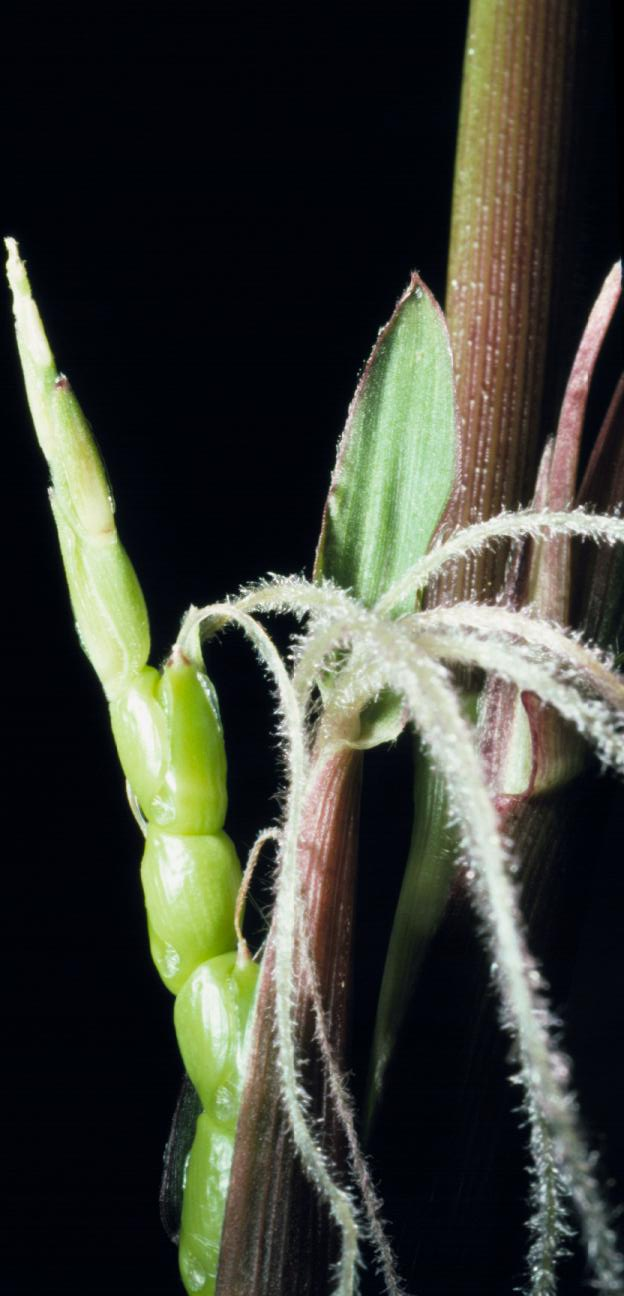
Zea diploperennis inflorescence

=== Vegetative characteristics ===
Zea diploperennis is a robust, erect, clump-forming, rhizomatous perennial plant with 5–10 primary culms arising from one rhizome system.

=== Generative characteristics ===
Female spikes are sessile or have long peduncles, and are frequently tipped by short male racemes.

=== Cytology ===
The chromosome count is 2n = 20.

== Taxonomy ==
It was described by Hugh Hellmut Iltis, John F. Doebley, and Rafael Guzmán in 1979.

== Distribution and habitat ==
It is endemic to southwest Jalisco, Mexico, where it occurs in maize fields, which in the Manatlán Biosphere Reserve are surrounded by pine and cloud forest, and it is also found in formerly open Quercus-Pinus-Carpinus forests at altitudes of 1400–2200 m above sea level.

== Conservation ==
Virtually all populations of this teosinte are either threatened or endangered: Z. diploperennis exists in an area of only a few square miles. The Mexican and Nicaraguan governments have taken action in recent years to protect wild teosinte populations, using both in situ and ex situ conservation methods. Currently, a large amount of scientific interest exists in conferring beneficial teosinte traits, such as insect resistance, perennialism, and flood tolerance, to cultivated maize lines, although this is challenging due to linked deleterious teosinte traits. Researchers are studying Z. diploperennis as its genes provide resistance against Striga, a parasitic plant that can decrease grain yield.
