= Estero Real Natural Reserve =

Nature reserve in Nicaragua

Coordinates: 12.87°N 87.22°W

Designations

Ramsar Wetland
- Official name: Deltas del Estero Real y Llanos de Apacunca
- Designated: 8 November 2001
- Reference no.: 1136

Estero Real Natural Reserve is a nature reserve in Nicaragua. It is one of the 78 reserves that are under official protection in the country. It is in the Northwest corner of Nicaragua in Chinandega Department and borders the country of Honduras.

== See also ==
- Llanos de Apacunca Genetic Reserve
- Tourism in Nicaragua
