= SMS Iltis =

Three ships of the German Kaiserliche Marine (Imperial Navy) have been named SMS Iltis:

- SMS Iltis (1878), a German gunboat launched in 1878
- SMS Iltis (1898), a German gunboat launched in 1898
- SMS Iltis (1917), an auxiliary cruiser sunk in 1917

== See also ==
- German torpedo boat Iltis, a torpedo boat launched in 1927
