= Hugh Iltis =

American botanist (1925 – 2016)

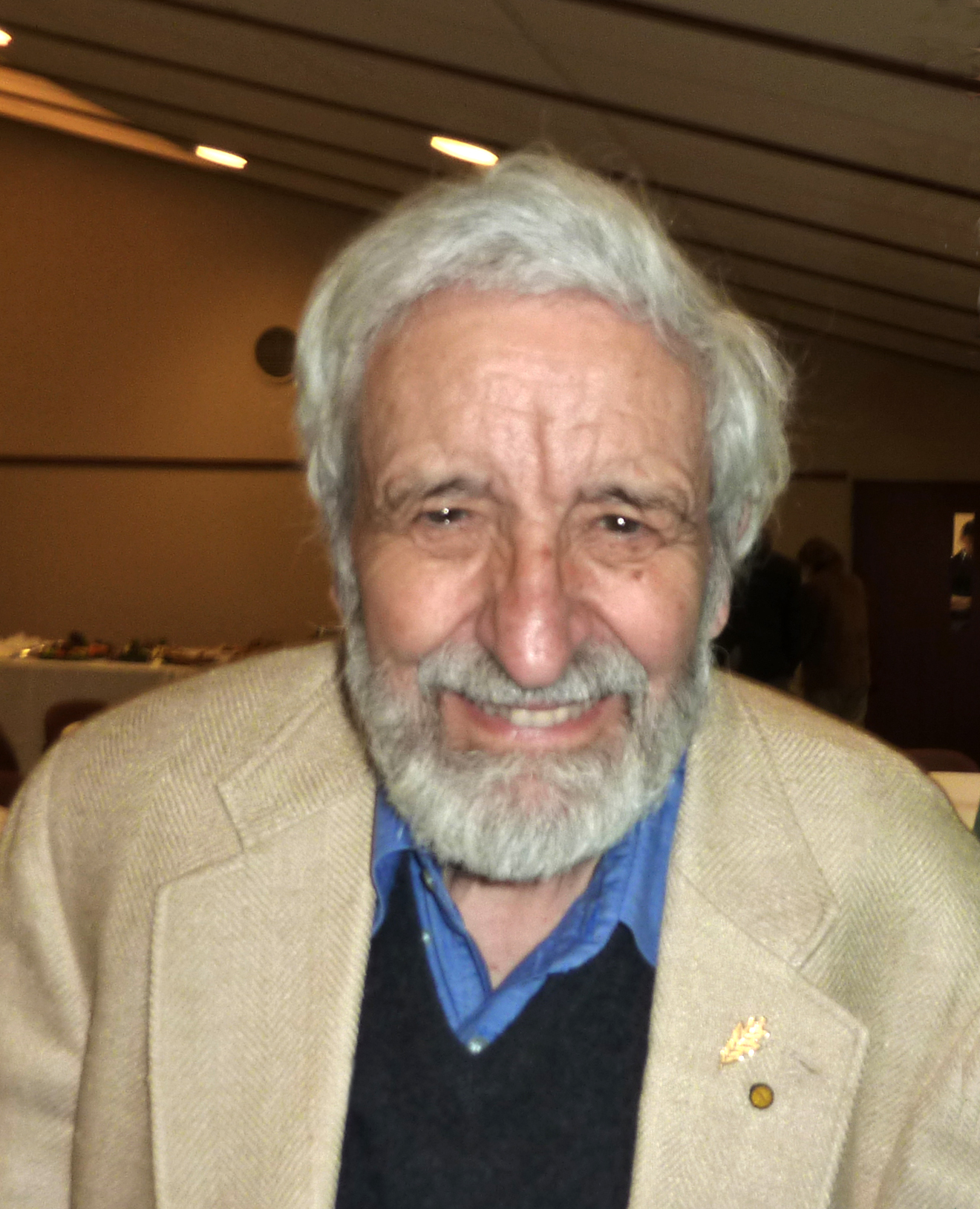
- Hugh Iltis at his 85th birthday celebration
- Born: Hugo Hellmut Iltis; April 7, 1925; Brno, Czechoslovakia
- Died: December 19, 2016 (aged 91); Madison, Wisconsin, USA
- Education: University of Tennessee; Washington University in St. Louis
- Known for: Discoveries in the domestication of corn (Zea mays); Environmental activism
- Spouses: Grace Schaffel; Carolyn Merchant; Sharyn Wisniewski
- Children: 4
- Awards: Merit Award of the National Wildlife Federation (1992); Asa Gray Award of the American Society of Plant Taxonomists (1994); Wisconsin Conservation Hall of Fame (2017)
- Scientific career
- Fields: Systematic botany
- Workplaces: University of Arkansas; University of Wisconsin–Madison
- Thesis: A Revision of the New World Species of Cleome (1952)
- Doctoral advisor: Edgar Anderson
- Other academic advisors: Robert Woodson; Julian Steyermark
- Author abbrev. (botany): Iltis

Hugh Iltis (April 7, 1925 – December 19, 2016) was a professor of botany and director of the herbarium at the University of Wisconsin–Madison. While he is most noted as a scientist for his role in the discovery of perennial teosinte (Zea diploperennis), a wild diploid relative of modern maize (Zea mays), he is also remembered as an outspoken environmental conservationist.

== Life and work ==
He was born Hugo Hellmut Iltis to Anni (née Liebscher) and Hugo Iltis, a botanist and geneticist who was a life sciences teacher at the German-language secondary school of Brünn (Brno). His father was also the first biographer of Gregor Mendel and a vocal opponent of Nazi "racial science". In the fall of 1938, the Iltis family was granted visas to enter the United States thanks to the intercession of the Emergency Committee in Aid of Displaced Foreign Scholars, along with affidavits of endorsement from Albert Einstein and Franz Boas. In January 1939, when Hitler's military was preparing the invasion of Czechoslovakia, thirteen-year-old Hugo escaped with his mother and his older brother Wilfred on a harrowing train ride that traversed Nazi Germany to France. He recalled that during a midnight stop at the Stuttgart station, Gestapo officers combed the train, removing ten passengers; the Iltises survived because the boys pretended to be asleep while their mother bluffed that she was the wife of a French diplomat. In Cherbourg, they were joined by Hugo Iltis and boarded the passenger ship RMS Aquitania for the Atlantic crossing. They settled in Fredericksburg, Virginia, where the senior Hugo Iltis was soon appointed to a professorship in biology at Mary Washington College and the younger Hugo Americanized his name to Hugh Iltis.

Iltis' undergraduate enrollment at the University of Tennessee was interrupted by service in the U.S. Army from 1944 to 1946, initially as a medic. Because of his native proficiency in German, he was transferred to an intelligence unit. After World War II, Iltis was stationed in Germany, where he participated in the interrogation of captive Wehrmacht and SS officers, including Heinrich Himmler, and processed documents to prosecute Nazi war crimes at Nuremberg.

Iltis returned to the University of Tennessee, where he studied botany under Aaron J. Sharp. He carried out graduate studies at Washington University in St. Louis, where he received his Ph.D. in 1952 under the direction of Edgar Anderson. He was primarily trained in plant systematics and taxonomy, with a focus on the caper family (Capparaceae) and the spider-flower family (Cleomaceae). His first academic appointment was at the University of Arkansas from 1952 to 1955, and here he completed a study of the Capparaceae of Nevada. Later works formed a series, "Studies in the Capparaceae", which includes 24 publications, including newly described species and genera. An associated series of papers describes his research in the Cleomaceae. (At the time when he did his studies, the Cleomaceae was included in the Capparaceae.)

In 1955, Iltis relocated to the Botany Department of the University of Wisconsin–Madison, where in addition to directing the herbarium he regularly taught plant geography, taxonomy, and grass systematics. He arranged to purchase much of the Catholic University of America herbarium when it was deaccessioned. By the time of his retirement in 1993, he had directed 37 candidates pursuing graduate degrees, and he and his students had collected thousands of specimens throughout the Upper Midwest to document distributions of plant species, leading to the publication of the Atlas of the Wisconsin Prairie and Savanna Flora (2000) coauthored with Herbarium Curator Theodore Cochrane. Anecdotes abounded concerning his colorful, often imperious manner. One colleague poked fun at Iltis by taping on his office door a cartoon that showed a boss dictating to a secretary and concluding, "Type that up, make ten thousand copies, and send them to all the important people in the world." At the end of a public lecture, when an audience member asked flippantly, "What good is nature?" Iltis shot back, "What good are you?" Yet students flocked to his course on "Man's Need for Nature", and he was generous with his knowledge and his counsel. He cultivated strong ties with Latin American botanists, often hosting them for extended stays at his home located within the University of Wisconsin–Madison Arboretum.

An avid naturalist, Iltis conducted numerous expeditions to Mexico and Central and South America to search for new discoveries. High in the Altiplano of southern Peru in 1962, he noticed a tiny flower that had not yet been classified by taxonomists. A full fifty years later, he and Harvey Ballard finally named it Viola lilliputana, and it was selected as one of the top ten new species of the year by the International Institute for Species Exploration. Iltis' work was of economic importance, because he identified new sources of genetic variability that have been used by horticultural breeders. On the same 1962 expedition to Peru, he spotted a wild tomato that he recorded as No. 832. He collected specimens for several herbaria, and sent samples and seeds to various specialists in the field. This plant turned out to be a new species of tomato with much higher sugar and solids content than domestically grown tomatoes. As a source for hybridization with domestic tomatoes, it has been used both to improve the flavor of tomatoes and to boost solids content.

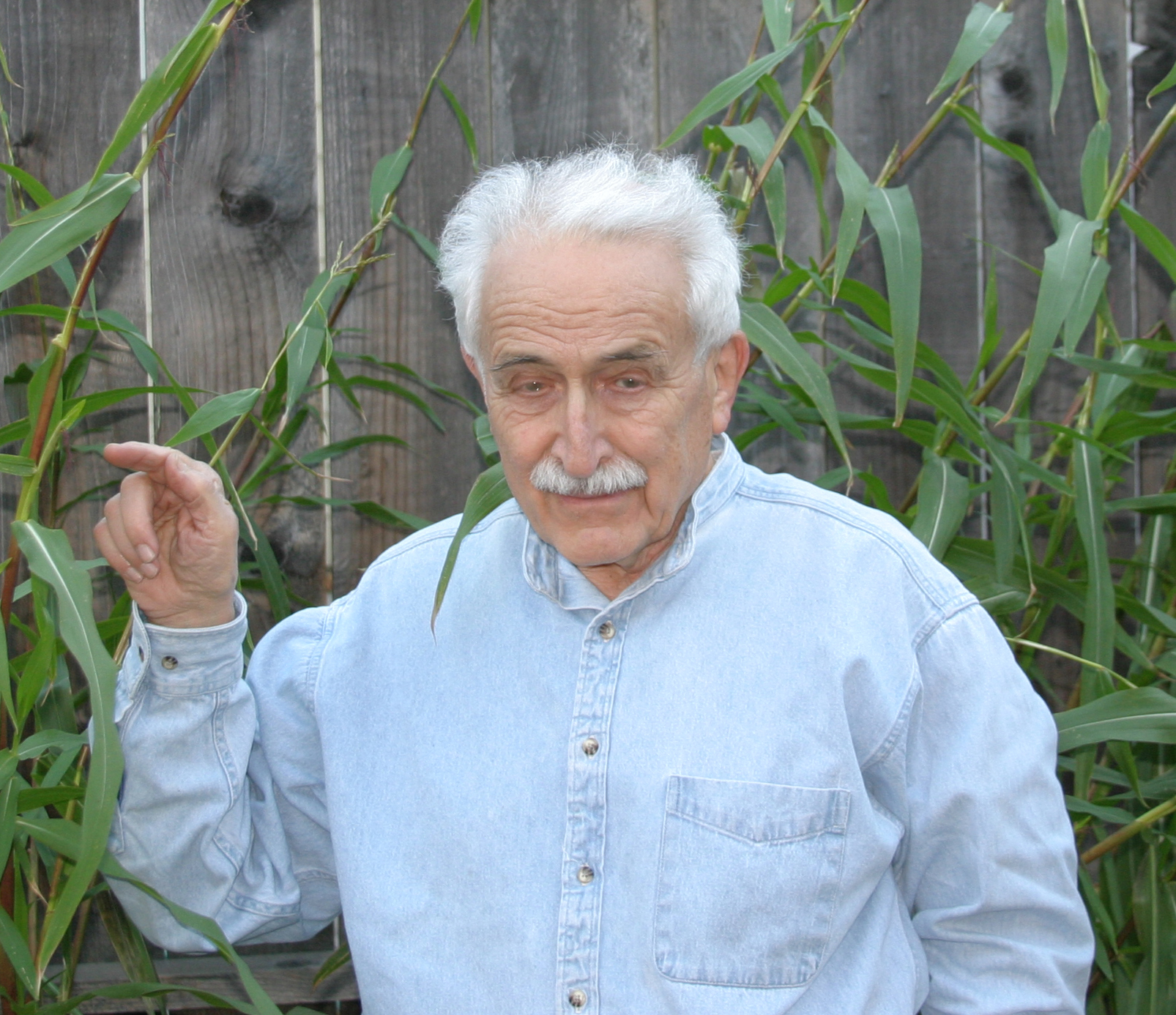
Hugh Iltis' brother Wilfred with Zea diploperennis in his home garden

Iltis used taxonomic and morphological approaches to investigate the domestication of corn, tracing the changes that transformed an unpromising wild grass into one of the most important food crops. His work supported the view that domestic corn was derived from a species of teosinte, a group of grasses that grows wild in many areas of Mexico. It was generally believed that the original wild corn was extinct in the wild. Iltis used a hypothetical illustration of this plant for a New Year's greeting card that he sent to family and friends in 1976. This drawing prompted a Mexican colleague, Luz María Villarreal de Puga (1913–2013), to launch an intensive search for just such a plant, and one of her students, Rafael Guzmán, found it (or so he thought) growing in the wild. In 1978, Iltis led a team of botanists to the site and determined that it was in fact a heretofore unknown species of teosinte, Zea diploperennis, which is valued for its resistance to certain viruses.

Iltis warned that the practice of collecting plants in tropical countries without involving local botanists and without depositing duplicate specimens in local herbaria would eventually cause trouble. And indeed, in recent years Brazil and some Andean countries have enacted laws that severely restrict field studies.

Iltis was an outspoken environmentalist and conservationist, championing the preservation of threatened habitats to protect biodiversity. Some species of teosinte are critically endangered, and all face a growing threat as agricultural land use expands in Mexico. He campaigned with colleagues at the University of Guadalajara to protect the natural environment of Zea diploperennis by creating the 345,000-acre Sierra de Manantlán Biosphere Reserve. He cofounded the Wisconsin chapter of the Nature Conservancy in 1960 and helped establish Hawaii's Natural Areas Law of 1970. He was a leader in the campaign to ban DDT in Wisconsin, which in 1968 was the first U.S. state to do so. He also called for a moratorium on cutting virgin timber in the state. In a 1970 article, "Man First? Man Last? The Paradox of Human Ecology", he wrote: "If we are to usher in an Age of Ecologic Reason, we must accept the certainty of a radical economic and political restructuring as well as ethical and cultural restructuring of society. No more expanding populations.... We must stop and limit ourselves now."

Iltis fathered four sons, Frank and Michael by his first wife, Grace Schaffel, and David and John by his second wife, Carolyn Merchant. He and his third wife, Sharyn Wisniewski (1950–2013), endowed a fund at the University of Wisconsin–Madison Department of Botany to support graduate student fieldwork in plant systematics. He remained active up to his death in Madison at age 91 from complications of vascular disease. His papers are preserved in the archives of the University of Wisconsin–Madison.

== Honors ==
Fellow botanists have honored Iltis by naming two genera and 19 species of plants after him. He received the Asa Gray Award of the American Society of Plant Taxonomists (1994) and a Merit Award of the Botanical Society of America (1996). Internationally, he received a Contribución Distinguida award from the president of Mexico for his role in establishing the Sierra de Manantlán Biosphere Reserve (1987), the Luz María Villarreal de Puga Medal from the University of Guadalajara (1994), and an honorary doctorate from the same university (2007). He received the Sol Feinstone Environmental Award conferred by the State University of New York College of Environmental Science and Forestry (1990), the National Wildlife Federation's Merit Award (1992), and the Society for Conservation Biology Service Award (1994). On Earth Day 2017, he was posthumously inducted into the Wisconsin Conservation Hall of Fame.

== Selected publications ==
- Iltis, Hugh H. (1947). "A Visit to Gregor Mendel's Home". Journal of Heredity, vol. 38. no. 6, pp. 163–166. https://doi.org/10.1093/oxfordjournals.jhered.a105719
- Iltis, Hugh H. (1950). "Studies in Virginia Plants. I. List of Bryophytes from the Vicinity of Fredericksburg, Virginia." Castanea. The Journal of the Southern Appalachian Botanical Club, vol. 15, pp. 38–50.
- Iltis, Hugh H. (1955). 'Capparidaceae' of Nevada. Beltsville: National Arboretum and Section of Plant Introduction, Horticultural Corp Research Branch, Plant Industry Station. 24 pp.
- Iltis, Hugh H. (1973). "Can One Love a Plastic Tree?" Bulletin of the Ecological Society of America, 54(4), 5–7,19. JSTOR 20165966
- Iltis, Hugh H., Doebley, John F., Guzmán, Rafael, & Pazy, Batia (1979). "Zea diploperennis (Gramineae): A New Teosinte from Mexico". Science, 203(4376), 186–188.
- Iltis, Hugh H., & Doebley, John F. (1980). "Taxonomy of Zea (Gramineae). II. Subspecific Categories in the Zea mays Complex and a Generic Synopsis". American Journal of Botany, 994–1004.
- Iltis, Hugh H. (1982). "Discovery of No. 832: An Essay in Defense of the National Science Foundation". Desert Plants. 3: 175–192. https://repository.arizona.edu/bitstream/handle/10150/550937/dp_03_04-175-192.pdf;jsessionid=15E022575DB1DF6E55009B91F11F29B3?sequence=1
- Iltis, Hugh H. (1983). "From Teosinte to Maize: The Catastrophic Sexual Transmutation". Science. 222 (4626): 886–894. Bibcode:1983Sci...222..886I. doi:10.1126/science.222.4626.886. PMID 17738466. S2CID 23247509.
- Vázquez García, José Antonio; Cuevas Guzmán, Ramón; Cochrane, Theodore S.; Iltis, Hugh H.; Santana Michel, Francisco J.; Guzmán Hernández, Luis (1995). Flora de Manantlán [Flora of Manantlán]. Sida, Botanical Miscellany. Vol. 13. Botanical Research Institute of Texas. ISSN 0883-1475.
- Iltis, Hugh H. (2000). "Homeotic Sexual Translocations and the Origin of Maize (Zea mays, Poaceae): A New Look at an Old Problem". Economic Botany, 54(1), 7–42. doi:10.1007/BF02866598
- Iltis, Hugh H., & Benz, Bruce F. (2000). "Zea nicaraguensis (Poaceae), a New Teosinte from Pacific Coastal Nicaragua". Novon, 382–390.
- Cochrane, Theodore S., & Iltis, Hugh H. (2000). Atlas of the Wisconsin Prairie and Savanna Flora. Madison: Wisconsin Department of Natural Resources. 226 pp. Online
- Ballard, Harvey E., and Iltis, Hugh H. (2012). "Viola lilliputana sp. Nov. (Viola sect. Andinium, Violaceae), One of the World’s Smallest Violets, from the Andes of Peru". Brittonia, 64(4), 353-358.
