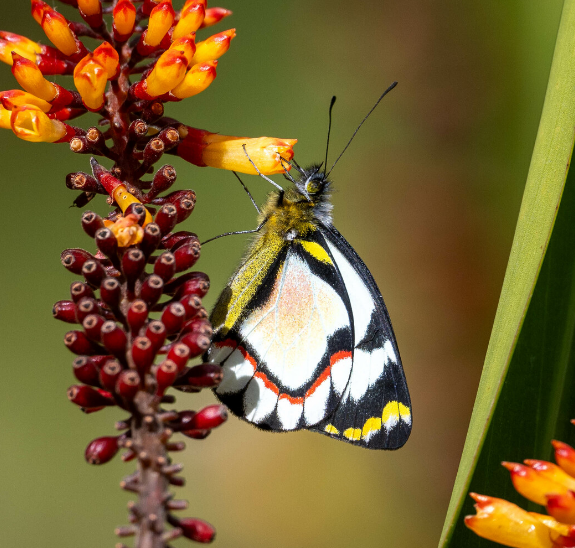
- subspecies sibil

Scientific classification
- Domain: Eukaryota
- Kingdom: Animalia
- Phylum: Arthropoda
- Class: Insecta
- Order: Lepidoptera
- Family: Pieridae
- Genus: Delias
- Species: D. iltis

Binomial name
- Delias iltis Ribbe, 1900

Synonyms
- Delias iltis bultemensis Lachlan, 2000; Delias iltis pseudoiltis Okano, 1989

= Delias iltis =

Species of butterfly

Delias iltis is a butterfly in the family Pieridae. It was described by Carl Ribbe in 1900. It is endemic to New Guinea.

The wingspan is about 60–64 mm.

== Subspecies ==
- Delias iltis iltis (southern Highlands & Owen Stanley Range, Papua New Guinea)
- Delias iltis leucotera Talbot, 1937 (Herzog Mtns, Papua New Guinea)
- Delias iltis majai Yagishita, 1993 (Ilu-Mulia, Irian Jaya)
- Delias iltis sibil van Mastrigt, 1995 (Abmisibil, Irian Jaya & north-east of Tabubil, Papua New Guinea)
