= Hugo Iltis =

Czech-American biologist (1882–1952)

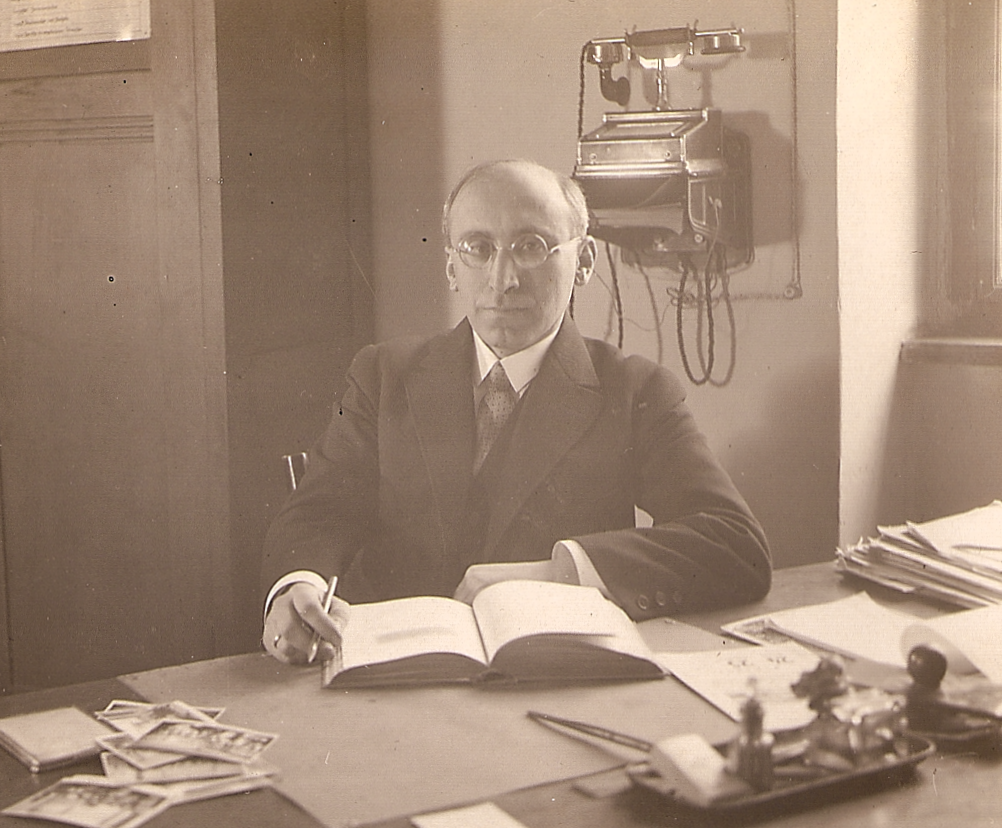
- Hugo Iltis in 1927 at the Volkshochschule in Brno, Czechoslovakia
- Born: April 11, 1882; Brno, Austria-Hungary
- Died: June 22, 1952 (aged 70); Fredericksburg, Virginia
- Resting place: Oak Hill Cemetery, Fredericksburg, Virginia.
- Known for: Biography of Gregor Mendel
- Scientific career
- Fields: Biologist historian

Hugo Iltis (April 11, 1882 – June 22, 1952) was a Czech-American biologist.

== Life and work ==
Iltis was born on April 11, 1882, in Brno, Moravia, Austria-Hungary. His family was of Jewish descent, and the family name translates as "polecat". He was the son of the town physician Dr. Moritz Iltis. He became a citizen of the newly established Czechoslovak Republic in 1919.

He attended the lower grades and the German-language gymnasium in Brno and then went on to study biology and botany at the University of Zurich, Switzerland, from 1900 to 1903 as an assistant to Arnold Dodel-Port and later Alfred Ernst (the successor of Dodel-Port in 1902). He studied botany at the University of Prague under Hans Molisch from 1903 to 1905 where he received his Ph.D. in 1905.

In 1906, he served as secretary for Naturforschender Verein in Brno, which was the society through which Gregor Mendel published his papers. In 1910, he raised funds for the Mendel Memorial in Brno, and served as secretary for the International Committee for the Mendel Memorial. He gave the commemorative speech at the unveiling of the memorial. He was also the secretary for the Mendel Centenary in 1922, a celebration of the hundredth anniversary of Mendel's birth.

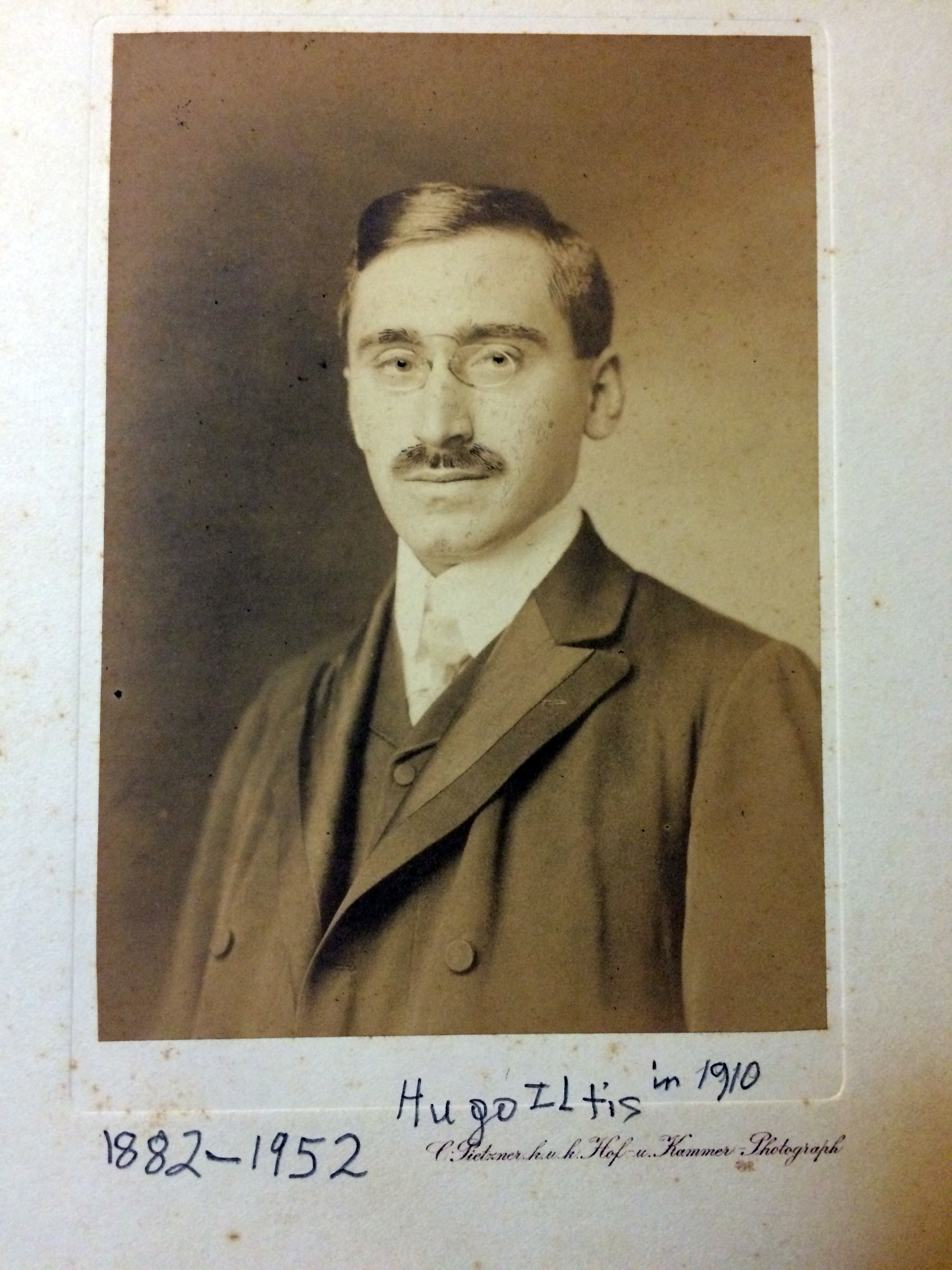
Hugo Iltis in 1910

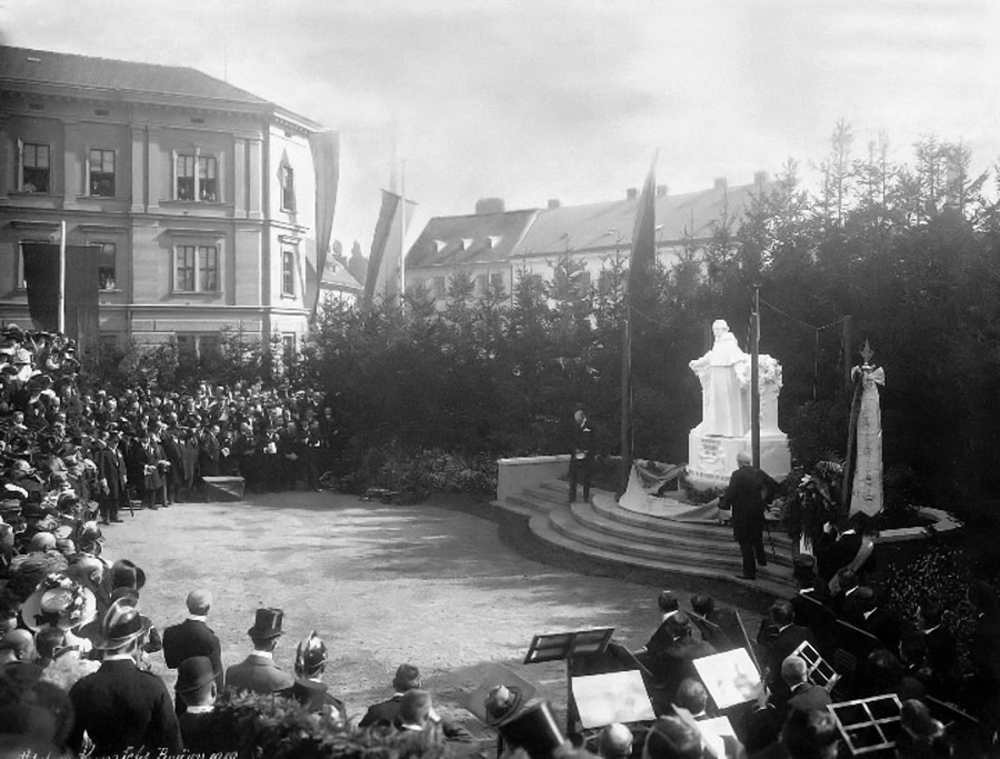
Unveiling of the Mendel Monument in 1910. Iltis organized the funding of the Monument.

He taught biology (with the civil service title "professor") at the German-language gymnasium in Brno from 1905 to 1938, and he also held an appointment as a Privatdozent for botany and genetics at the Deutsche Technische Hochschule (German Polytechnical Institute) in Brno from 1911 to 1938. He was the founder and director of the Masaryk People's University (Masaryk Volkshochschule) in Brno, an adult education evening school, from 1921 to 1938. This Volkshochschule was the largest institution for adult education in Czechoslovakia with an enrollment above 2000. He founded the Mendel Museum in Brno in 1932 and curated it to 1937. The museum contained many valuable manuscripts and relics of the life and work of Mendel.

A socialist, Iltis spent much of his time from 1930 to 1938 combating the racist biology (eugenics) of the Nazis. He was a key organizer and host of the 1932 Brno congress of the World League for Sexual Reform.

With the help of Franz Boas and Albert Einstein and the Emergency Committee in Aid of Displaced Foreign Scholars, the Iltis family received a United States visa in the fall of 1938. Hugo left Czechoslovakia in December 1938 on the last plane out and traveled to England to lecture. His wife Anni Iltis and their two boys left behind their life in Brno and joined him in January 1939 in France following a harrowing train ride through Germany and France. They sailed for the U.S. from the port Cherbourg on the passenger ship RMS Aquitania.

Initially, he taught for 5 weeks at the International School, run by Peter Ray Ogden. Following a chance meeting with Dean Edward Alvey in the grocery store, he was offered a professorship in biology at Mary Washington College in Fredericksburg, Virginia, where he taught for approximately 12 years. He was also the founder and curator of the Mendel Museum of Genetics, now housed at the University of Illinois Archives. He died at Fredericksburg on June 22, 1952. His younger son was the plant morphologist and taxonomist Hugh Iltis. His elder son was the entomologist Fred Iltis.

Later in life, to his great surprise, he learned from his wife's sister Lisi Liebscher that his wife Anni Iltis was a distant cousin of Gregor Mendel.

He was a fellow in the A.A.A.S., a member of the Genetics Society of America, the American Genetics Association, the Virginia Academy of Science, and the American Association of University Professors.

He was listed in: Köpfe Europas, Wer Ist's?, Who Knows What?, and American Men of Science.

Archives of his work are stored in the University of Wisconsin Library Special Collections.

== Works ==
- 1903. Ph.D. diss. "Über den Einfluss von Licht und Dunkel auf das Längenwachstum der Adventivwurzel bei Wasserpflanzen". Berichte der Deutschen Botanischen Gesellschaft, vol. 21, no. 9, pp. 508-517.
- 190?. "Gregor Mendels Arbeiten und ihre Bedeutung für die moderne Wissenschaft". Abhandlungen, Vorträge, Lehrproben. Offprint from unidentified journal, pp. 242-249.
- 1905. "Leuchtende Pilze. Vortrag gehalten von Phil. Dr. Iltis in der Sitzung des Ärztlichen Vereines am 20. Oktober 1905". Mitteilungen des Zentralvereines deutscher Ärzte in Mähren. 7 pages.
- 1908. Johann Gregor Mendel als Forscher und Mensch. Ein Gedenkblatt. Brünn: Mendeldenkmal-Komitee. 19 pages.
- 1909. Mittelschülerheime. Ein Vorschlag zur Reform. Brünn: by the author. 12 pages.
- 1910. Preface to Mendelismus by Reginald Crundall Punnett, translated by Wilfried von Proskowetz. Brünn: C. Winiker. 117 pages.
- 1910. "Vom Mendeldenkmal und von seiner Enthüllung". Verhandlungen des naturforschenden Vereines in Brünn, vol. 49. 29 pages.
- 1910. "Über eine durch Maisbrand verursachte intracarpellare Prolifikation bei Zea mays L.". Sitzungsberichte der Kaiserlichen Akademie der Wissenschaften in Wien. Mathematisch-naturwissenschaftliche Klasse., vol. 119, no. 1, pp. 1-15.
- 1911. "Über das Vorkommen und die Entstehung des Kautschuks bei den Kautschukmisteln". Sitzungsberichte der Kaiserlichen Akademie der Wissenschaften in Wien. Mathematisch-naturwissenschaftliche Klasse, vol. 120, no. 1.
- 1911. "Über einige bei Zea mays L. beobachtete Atavismen, ihre Verursachung durch den Maisbrand, Ustilago maydis D.C. (Corda) und über die Stellung der Gattung Zea im System". Zeitschrift für induktive Abstammungs- und Vererbungslehre, vol. 5. no. 1, pp. 38-57.
- 1911. Die Umgebung von Radeschin mit besonderer Berücksichtigung ihrer Flora. Brünn: Staatsgymnasium. 18 pages.
- 1912. "Über abnorme (heteromorphe) Blüten und Blütenstände". Verhandlungen des naturforschenden Vereins in Brünn, vol. 51. 23 pages.
- 1913. "Über das Gynophor und die Fruchtausbildung bei der Gattung Geum." Sitzungsberichte der Kaiserlichen Akademie der Wissenschaften in Wien. Mathematisch-naturwissenschaftliche Klasse., vol. 122, no. 1, pp. 1177-1212.
- 1914. "Die Steppenflora von Schlapanitz und ihre Veränderungen in den letzten fünfzig Jahren". Verhandlungen des naturforschenden Vereines in Brünn, vol. 52. 20 pages.
- 1915. Erlebnisse der 1. Brünner freiwilligen Sanitätsabteilung vom Roten Kreuze. Brünn: 1. Brünner freiwillige Sanitätsabteilung. 31 pages.
- 1915. Szenen aus dem Kriegsleben der 1. Brünner freiwilligen Sanitätsabteilung. Brünn: 1. Brünner freiwillige Sanitätsabteilung. 15 pages.
- 1916. Aus dem Tagebuch der 1. Brünner freiwilligen Sanitätsabteilung. Brünn: 1. Brünner freiwillige Sanitätsabteilung. 32 pages.
- 1923. Über die Verbreitung der Malariamücken in Mähren und über die Gefahr einer Malariaendemie. Brno: by the author. 29 pages.
- 1923. (Editor.) Studia Mendeliana ad centesimum diem natalem Gregorii Mendelii a grata patria celbrandum adiuvante ministerio Pragensi edita. Brno: Typos. 30 pages.
- 1923. "Die Mendel-Jahrhundertfeier in Brünn". In Studia Mendeliana ad centesimum diem natalem Gregorii Mendelii. Brno: Typos.
- 1924. Gregor Johann Mendel. Leben, Werk und Wirkung. Berlin: J. Springer. 426 pages.
  - Translated by Eden and Cedar Paul as Life of Mendel. New York: W. W. Norton & Co, 1932. 336 pages. New York: Hafner, 1966: London: George Allen & Unwin, 1966. Ann Arbor: University Microfilms International, 1976.
  - Translated by Zhenyao Tan as Mên-tê-êrh chuan. Shanghai: Shang wu yin shu guan, 1924. 2 vols. in 1, 661 pp. Shanghai: Shang wu yin shu guan, Minguo 25 [1936].
  - Translated as Zasshu shokubutsu no kenkyū. Tsuketari Menderu shōden. Tōkyō : Iwanami Shoten, Shōwa 3 [1928]. 100 pp. Translated by Yuzuru Nagashima as Menderu no shōgai. Tōkyō: Sōgensha, Shōwa 17 [1942]. Menderu den. Tōkyō: Tōkyō Sōgensha, 1960.
- 1924. Die Volkshochschule Brünn. Gründung, Aufbau, Ausgestaltung. Brno: s.n. 83 pages.
- 1925. "Naturwissenschaft und Sozialismus". In Das neue Jahr 1926. Vienna: Wiener Volksbuchhandlung. 8 pages.
- 1925 (?). "Über eine Symbiose zwischen Planorbis und Batrachospermum".
- 1925 (?). "Blutsverwandtschaft im Pflanzenreich".
- 1925 (?). "Meeresstrand im Binnenland".
- 1925 (?). "Arnold Dodel, Leben und Werk eines sozialistischen Naturforschers".
- 1925. Kampf und Gemeinschaft in Natur und Gesellschaft. [Prague]: Deutsche sozialdemokratische Arbeiterpartei in der Tschechoslowakischen Republik. 15 pages.
- 1926. "Gregor Mendels Selbstbiographie". Genetica: An International Journal of Genetics and Evolution, vol. 8, nos. 3-4, pp. 329-334.
- 1926 (?). "Die Geschichte der Volkshochschule". Buch und Volk, vol. 3. 12 pp.
- 192?. Anleitung zur Anlage und Pflege von Schüler-Aquarien. Brno: by the author. 7 pages.
- 1928-29. (Series coeditor.) "Totius orbis flora photographica arte depicta". 2 vols. Brno: Rudolf M. Rohrer. Vol. 1: Trinidad and the West Indies, by Karel Domin, 1929. Translated by M. J. Lauriol as La Trinité et les Antilles. Brno: Rudolf M. Rohrer, 1929. 65 pp. Vol. 2: Floral province of the European 'Mittelgebirge', I, by Hugo Iltis and Bert Schulz, 1928. (No more published.)
- 1928. (With Bert Schulz.) Floral Province of the European 'Mittelgebirge', I. Brno: Rudolf M. Rohrer, 1928. Translated by M. J. Lauriol as Province botanique des basses montagnes de l'Europe centrale. Brno: Rudolf M. Rohrer, 1928.
- 1929. "Charles Naudin". Der Züchter. Zeitschrift für theoretische und angewandte Genetik, vol. 1, no. 8, pp. 248-250.
- 1929. Hranice a možnosti socialistické výchovné a vzdělávací práce. Prague: Pražská odbočka Dělnické akademie. 15 pages.
- 1930. "Die Kokospalme und ihre Kultur". Ernährung der Pflanze, vol. 10, pp. 224-226.
- 1930. Die deutsche und die österreichische Volkshochschule. Ihre Formen und Probleme. Plzeň: by the author. 27 pages.
- 1930. Volkstümliche Rassenkunde. Jena: Urania. 79 pages.
- 1931. "Rassenforschung und Rassenfrage", Der Kampf. Sozialdemokratische Monatsschrift (Vienna), vol. 24, pp. 220-225.
- 1931. "Der Schädelindex in Wissenschaft und Politik". Die Gesellschaft (Berlin), vol. 8, pp. 549-562.
- 1933. "Alarm!" In Licht ins Volk. Brno: Volkshochschule. 6 pages.
- 1935. Rasse in Wissenschaft und Politik. Prague: Verlag der "Wahrheit". 47 pages. Translated by Maurice Bernard Coëlho as Het rassenprobleem in politiek en wetenschap. 's-Gravenhage: Confidentia, [1936]. 55 pages.
- 1935. Rasa ve vědě a v politice. Prague: "Pokrok". 104 pages.
- 1936. Der Mythus von Blut und Rasse. Vienna: Rudolf Harand. 88 pages. With an introductory article by Iltis, "Der Rassismus im Mantel der Wissenschaft", and two other articles written by him under a pseudonym.
- 1938. "Die Abstammung Gregor Mendels, Julius Wiesners und Hans Molischs". Prager Rundschau, vol. 8, pp. 299–304.
- 1943. "The Mendel Museum at Mary Washington College". Scientific Monthly, vol. 56, no. 4, pp. 386–387.
- 1943. "Gregor Mendel and His Work". Scientific Monthly, vol. 56, no. 5, pp. 414–423.
- 1948. "Hemophilia, the Royal Disease, and the British Royal Family". Journal of Heredity, vol. 39, no. 4, pp. 113–116.
- 1948. "Inheritance of Missing Incisors". Journal of Heredity, vol. 39, no. 12, pp. 333–336.
- 1949. "An Immigrant Conquers a Continent: The Story of the Wild Garlic". Scientific Monthly, vol. 68, no. 2 (February), pp. 122–128.
- 1950. "The Genes and Academician Lysenko". Journal of Heredity, vol. 41, no. 6.
- 2011. The Letters on G. J. Mendel: Corresponde[n]ce of William Bateson, Hugo Iltis and Erich von Tschermak-Seysenegg with Alois and Ferdinand Schindler, 1902-1935. Prague: Mervart.
- 2017. Race, Genetics and Science. Resisting Racism in the 1930s. Masaryk University Press, Brno.
