= Apacunca Genetic Reserve =

Nature reserve in Nicaragua

Apacunca Genetic Reserve is a nature reserve in Nicaragua. It is one of the 78 reserves which are officially under protection in the country.

The reserve is in Chinandega, approximately 100 miles from the nation's capital Managua. It was officially established in 2001 and has an area of 81,700 hectares.

Part of the reserve was created in 1996 to preserve the Zea luxurians species of wild maize; 35 species of fauna have also been identified onsite.
