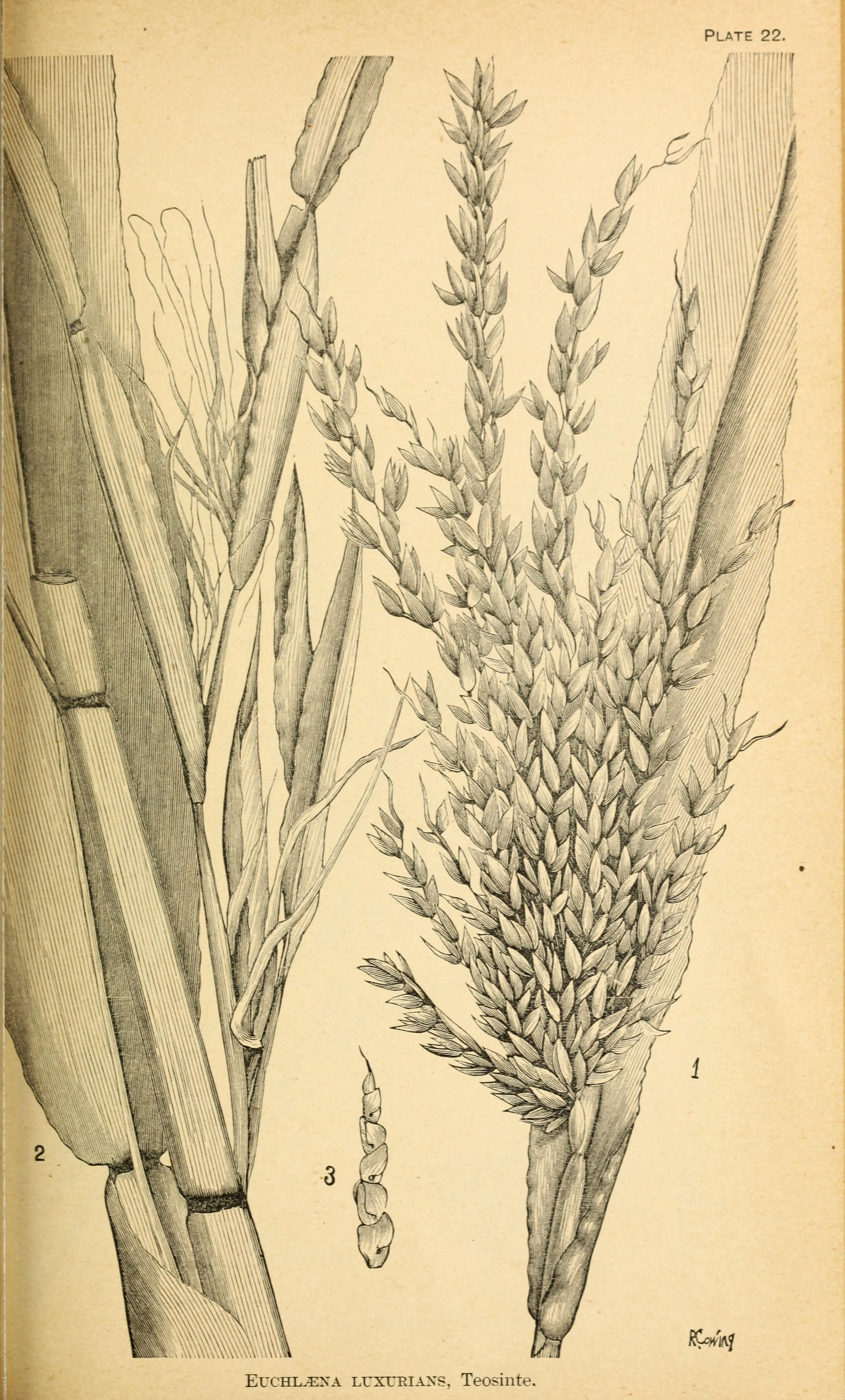

Conservation status
- Vulnerable (IUCN 3.1)

Scientific classification
- Kingdom: Plantae
- Clade: Embryophytes
- Clade: Tracheophytes
- Clade: Angiosperms
- Clade: Monocots
- Clade: Commelinids
- Order: Poales
- Family: Poaceae
- Subfamily: Panicoideae
- Genus: Zea
- Species: Z. luxurians

Binomial name
- Zea luxurians (Durieu & Asch.) R.M.Bird

Synonyms
- Euchlaena luxurians Durieu & Asch. Euchlaena mexicana var. luxurians (Durieu & Asch.) Haines; Zea mays subsp. luxurians (Durieu & Asch.) Iltis; Zea mexicana subsp. luxurians (Durieu & Asch.) Greb.

= Zea luxurians =

Species of carnivorous plant

Zea luxurians, also referred to by the common names Maíz de Monte, Florida teosinte and Guatemalan teosinte, is a species of annual flowering plant in the family Poaceae. It is a true grass and a teosinte.

== Distribution ==
It is native to Guatemala, Honduras and Mexico, but it can also be found in areas where it has been introduced, including Brazil, Colombia, and French Guiana.

== Genome ==
Tenaillon et al., 2011 obtain genome size estimates and transposable element (TE) content by high-throughput sequencing. They find ~50% difference in size and that divergence from maize (Z. mays) is largely due to different % of TE content. Ratios between TE families are highly conserved between Z. luxurians and Z. mays.

== See also ==
- Apacunca Genetic Reserve
