= Emergency Committee in Aid of Displaced Foreign Scholars =

The Emergency Committee in Aid of Displaced Foreign Scholars was an American organization established in New York City in 1933 to assist scholars displaced by the Nazi regime. It was initially known as the Emergency Committee in Aid of Displaced German Scholars and focused on German academics who had lost their positions because of political or religious persecution. In 1938, as Nazi expansion spread across Europe, the committee broadened its work to scholars from other affected countries and adopted its later name.

The committee was formed through the efforts of Alfred E. Cohn, Bernard Flexner, Fred M. Stein and Stephen P. Duggan, director of the Institute of International Education (IIE). Livingston Farrand became chairman, Duggan served as secretary and later chairman, and Stein served as treasurer. The organization raised funds to support refugee scholars through grants to colleges, universities and other institutions rather than making payments directly to individual scholars.

Over its twelve years of operation, approximately 6,000 displaced scholars and other professionals appealed to the committee for assistance. The committee provided grants for 335 scholars and assisted additional applicants through referrals to other organizations. Its work was supported primarily by foundations and other philanthropic organizations, as well as individual donors.

== Activities ==
The committee initially concentrated on scholars displaced from Germany after Adolf Hitler came to power in 1933. Its work later expanded as Nazi persecution and military expansion affected scholars in Austria, Czechoslovakia, Norway, Belgium, the Netherlands, France and other European countries.

American colleges and universities hosted many of the scholars assisted by the committee. The organization worked with academic institutions and philanthropic groups to arrange positions and financial support for displaced academics.

Alvin Saunders Johnson, co-founder and director of The New School, was also involved in efforts to assist European scholars displaced by Nazi persecution. In 1933, he established the University in Exile at the New School, initially bringing a group of European academics to New York. The program was later renamed the Graduate Faculty of Political and Social Science.

== Edward R. Murrow ==
In 1932, before beginning his broadcasting career, Edward R. Murrow became assistant director of the Institute of International Education. In late 1933, he also became the unpaid assistant secretary of the Emergency Committee in Aid of Displaced German Scholars.

During his two years working primarily for the committee, Murrow handled correspondence and financial matters, assessed applications, helped locate academic positions, arranged visas and travel, and worked with universities and governments on placements for refugee scholars. He remained assistant secretary until 1935.

Murrow later described the committee's work as one of the most personally satisfying undertakings of his career. During his period with the organization, nearly 100 displaced German scholars were brought to the United States.

== Relationship with the Scholar Rescue Fund ==
The Institute of International Education continued to organize programs assisting threatened and displaced scholars after the Second World War. In 2002, IIE established the Scholar Rescue Fund, which provides fellowships for scholars facing threats to their lives or academic work.

IIE has described the Emergency Committee as part of the institutional history that preceded the Scholar Rescue Fund and its later scholar-rescue programs.

== Notable scholars ==
Scholars associated with or assisted by the committee included:

- Margarete Bieber
- Felix Bloch
- Richard Brauer
- Martin Buber
- Max Delbrück
- Tilly Edinger
- Susanne Charlotte Engelmann
- Eva Fiesel
- James Franck
- Hilda Geiringer
- Hugo Iltis
- Jacques Maritain
- Herbert Marcuse
- Emmy Noether
- Kurt Lewin
- Otto Nathan
- Hans Morgenthau
- Thomas Mann
- Fritz Reiche
- Paul Tillich
- Rachel Wischnitzer

== Legacy ==
Murrow's work with the Institute of International Education and the Emergency Committee formed part of his early professional experience before his broadcasting career. His work in scholar rescue was later discussed in accounts of his life and career.
