= Protected areas of Nicaragua =

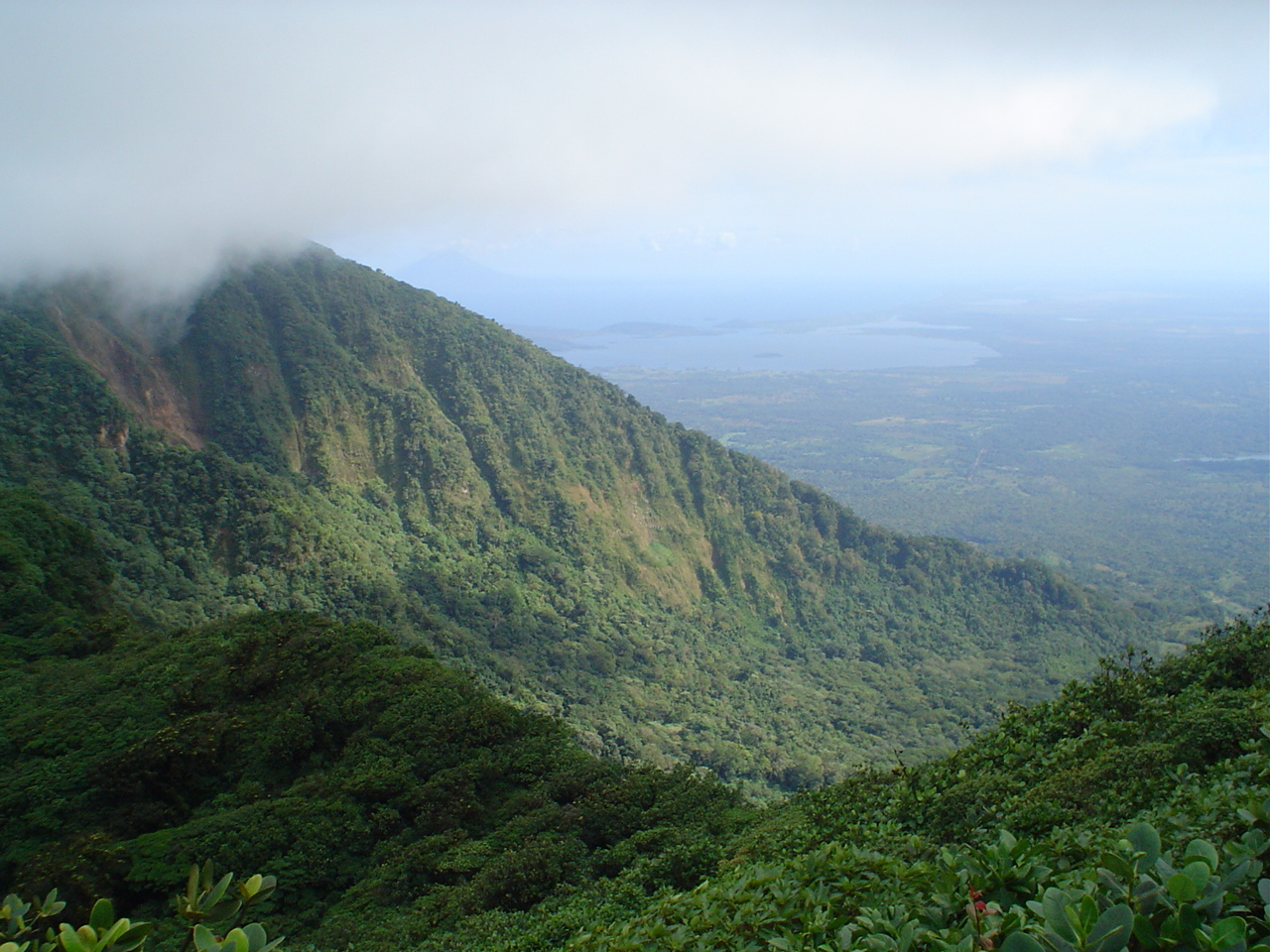
Mombacho Volcano Natural Reserve

The protected areas of Nicaragua are areas that have natural beauty or significance and are protected by Nicaragua. Nicaragua has 78 protected areas that cover 22,422 km^{2}, about 17.3% of the nations landmass. The National System of Protected Areas (SINAP) is administered by the Ministry of the Environment and Natural Resources (MARENA).

== History ==
The Peninsula of Cosigüina Wildlife Refuge was established in 1958 and was the first protected area in Nicaragua. Two more protected areas were established in 1979 and there was a total of 25 by 1990. Prior to 1979, the Central Bank of Nicaragua was assigned responsibility for the two national parks and one natural reserve created during the Somoza regime.

In March 1999, a new law established regulations for private reserves in Nicaragua. Private wildlife reserves are defined as private areas dedicated to conservation by their landowners and recognized by MARENA, on the basis of certain criteria and the potential for the conservations of biodiversity.

== List of protected areas ==
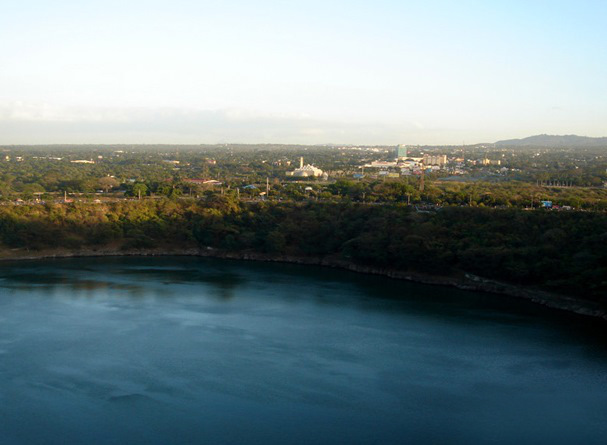
Vista of Tiscapa Lagoon and the capital city, Managua

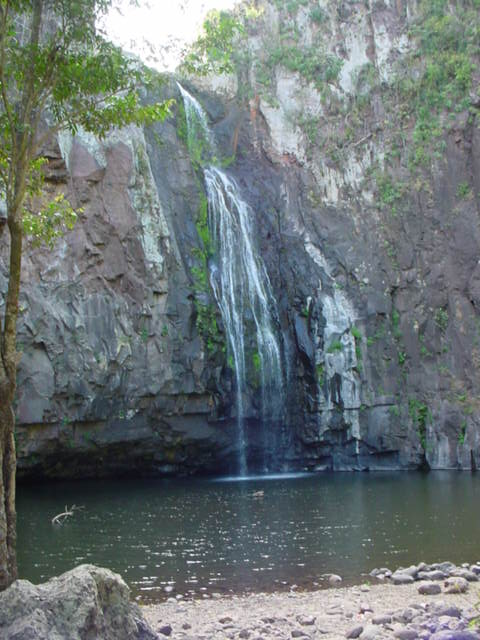
Salto Eatanzuela (Estanzuela waterfall), located in the Tisey Estanzuela Natural Reserve in Estelí

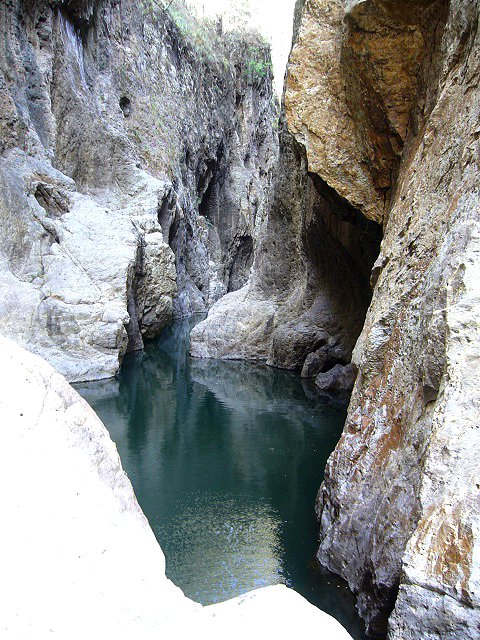
The Somoto Canyon National Monument

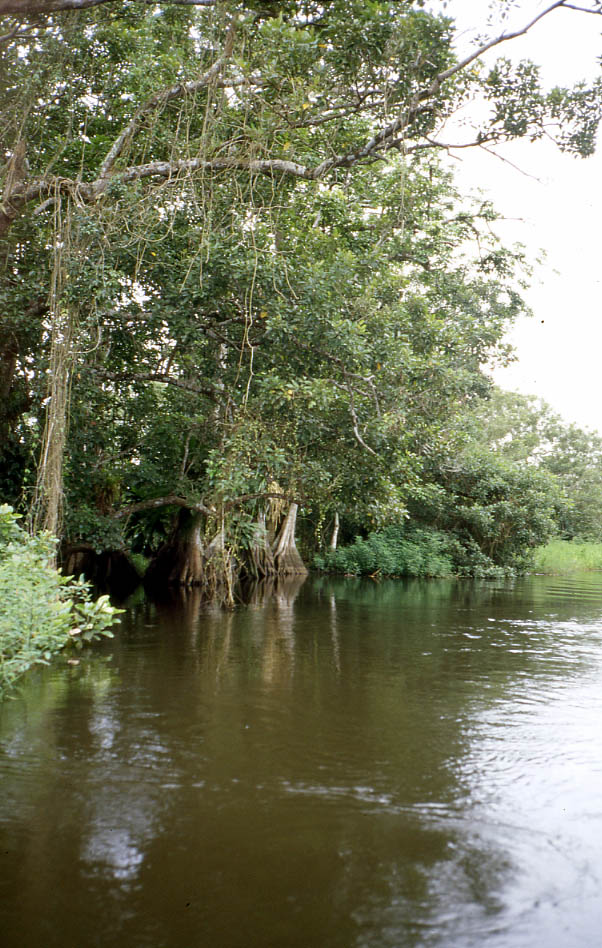
A river along the Los Guatuzos Wildlife Refuge

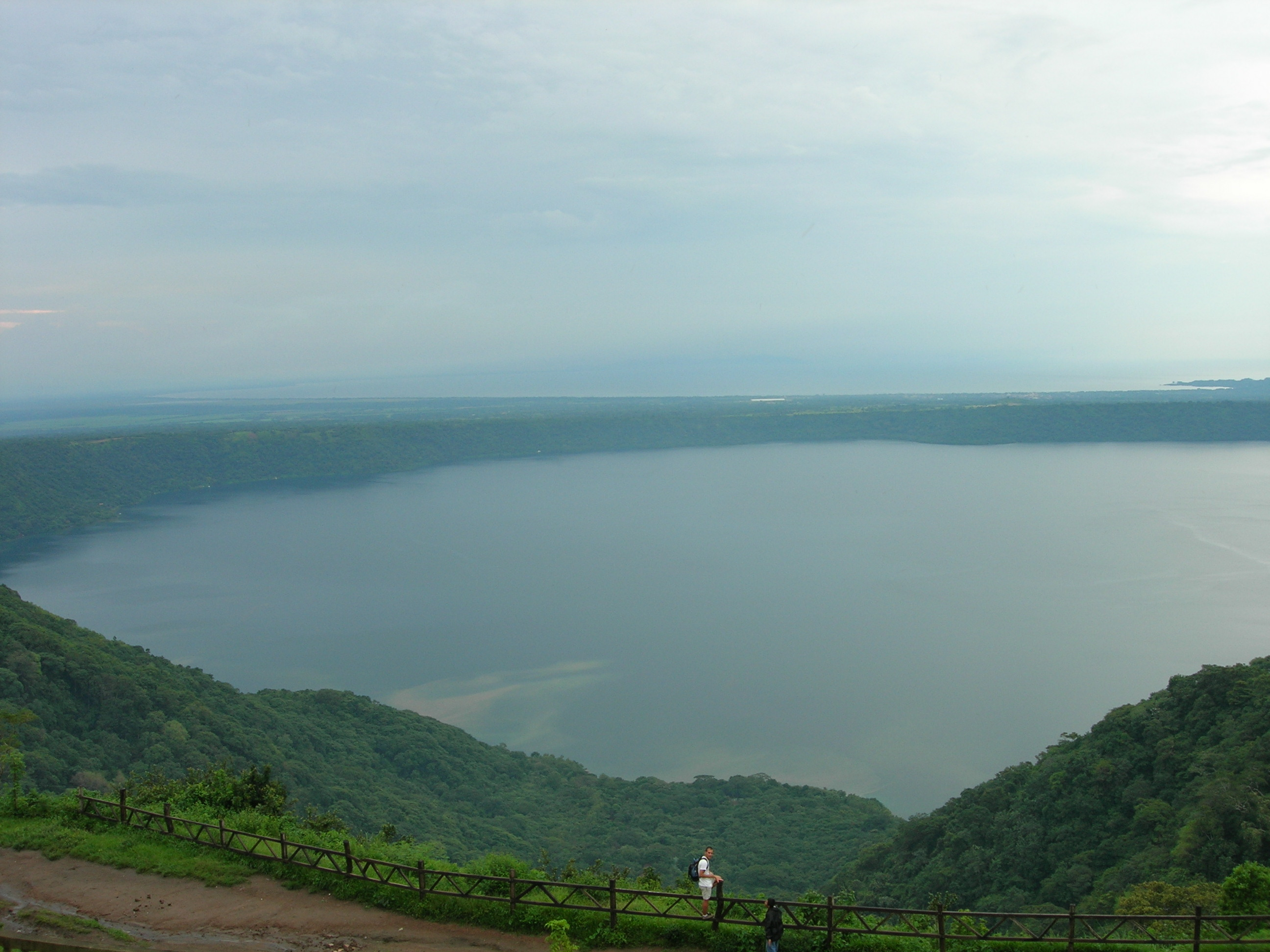
Vista of the Apoyo Lagoon from the mirador of Catarina

This is a complete list of protected areas in Nicaragua:

- Alamikamaba Natural Reserve
- Apacunca Genetic Reserve
- Apoyo Lagoon Natural Reserve
- Asososca Lagoon Natural Reserve
- Bismuna Raya Lagoon Natural Reserve
- Bosawás Biosphere Reserve
- Cabo Viejo-Tala-Sulamas Natural Reserve
- Cayos Miskitos Biological Reserve
- Cerro Apante Nature Reserve
- Cerro Arenal Natural Reserve
- Cerro Banacruz Natural Reserve
- Cerro Cola Blanca Natural Reserve
- Cerro Cumaica–Cerro Alegre Nature Reserve
- Cerro Guabule Nature Reserve
- Cerro Kilambé Natural Reserve
- Cerro Mombachito - La Vieja Natural Reserve
- Cerro Musún Natural Reserve
- Cerro Pancasan Natural Reserve
- Cerro Quiabuc–Las Brisas Nature Reserve
- Cerro Silva Natural Reserve
- Cerro Tisey–Estanzuela Nature Reserve
- Cerro Wawashang Natural Reserve
- Chacocente Wildlife Refuge
- Chiltepe Peninsula Natural Reserve
- Chocoyero-El Brujo Natural Reserve
- Cordillera de Yolaina Natural Reserve
- Cordillera Dipilto and Jalapa Natural Reserve
- Cosigüina Volcano Natural Reserve
- El Arenal Natural Reserve
- Estero Padre Ramos Natural Reserve
- Estero Real Natural Reserve
- Fila Masigüe Natural Reserve
- Hurricane Mitch Victims National Monument
- Indio Maíz Biological Reserve
- Juan Venado Island Natural Reserve
- Kligna Natural Reserve
- Kukalaya Lagoon Natural Reserve
- La Inmaculada Fort Historical Site
- La Máquina Natural Reserve
- Layasiksa Lagoon Natural Reserve
- Limbaika Natural Reserve
- Llanos de Apacunca Genetic Reserve
- Llanos de Karawala Natural Reserve
- Llanos de Makantaka Natural Reserve
- Los Guatuzos Wildlife Refuge
- Macizos de Peñas Blancas Natural Reserve
- Maderas Volcano Natural Reserve
- Makantaka Natural Reserve
- Masaya Volcano National Park
- Mecatepe Lagoon Natural Reserve
- Mesas de Moropotente Natural Reserve
- Miraflor Natural Reserve
- Mombacho Volcano Natural Reserve
- O Parks, WildLife, and Recreation, formerly named Ostional Private WildLife Reserve
- Nejapa Lagoon Natural Reserve
- Pahara Lagoon Natural Reserve
- Punta Gorda Natural Reserve
- Río Manares Natural Reserve
- Río San Juan Wildlife Refugee
- Salto Río Yasika Natural Reserve
- Selva Negra Cloud Forest Reserve
- Sierra Amerrisque Nature Reserve
- Sierra Quirragua Natural Reserve
- Solentiname National Monument
- Somoto Canyon National Monument
- Tepesomoto–Pataste Nature Reserve
- Tiscapa Lagoon Natural Reserve
- Tisma Lagoon Natural Reserve
- Volcán Maderas Natural Reserve
- Volcán Pilas El Hoyo Natural Reserve
- Volcán San Cristóbal Natural Reserve
- Volcán San Cristóbal-Casita Natural Reserve
- Volcán Telica Rota Natural Reserve
- Volcán Yali Natural Reserve
- Yolaina Natural Reserve
- Yucul Genetic Reserve
- Yulu Karata Natural Reserve
- Yulu Natural Reserve
- Zapatera Archipelago National Park

== See also ==
- National System of Protected Areas (Nicaragua)
- Tourism in Nicaragua
- Wildlife of Nicaragua
