= Tourism in Nicaragua =

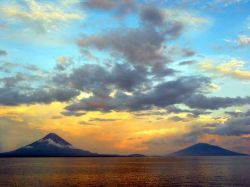
Maderas and Concepcion Volcanoes on Ometepe island are popular tourist destinations.

Tourism in Nicaragua has grown considerably recently, and it is now the second largest industry in the nation. Nicaraguan President Daniel Ortega has stated his intention to use tourism to combat poverty throughout the country.

The growth in tourism has positively affected the agricultural, commercial, and finance industries, as well as the construction industry. The results for Nicaragua's tourism-driven economy have been significant, with the nation welcoming one million tourists in a calendar year for the first time in its history in 2010.

In mid-2018, tourism in Nicaragua came to a virtual standstill due to the 2018–2021 Nicaraguan protests.

== History ==
Life in Nicaragua

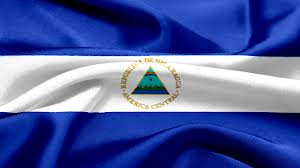

Cuisine
Culture
Demographics
Education
Holidays
Human Rights
Literature
Music
Politics
Religion
Tourism

During the Nicaraguan Revolution in the 1980s, Nicaragua was not regarded as a place to travel, which caused a decrease in tourism. However, rapid expansion of the tourist industry over the last decade has made it the nation's second largest industry. Over the last 7 years tourism has grown about 70% nationwide with rates of 10%-16% annually.

Nicaragua is mostly famous for its landscapes, flora and fauna, wildlife, culture, beaches, lakes, and volcanoes. By 2010, the nation welcomed one million visitors—the most in its entire history for a calendar year. Nicaragua's tourism industry in 2010 raked in approximately 360 million dollars for the nation's economy.

According to the Nicaraguan news program Canal 2 TV Noticias, the country's main tourist attractions are beaches, scenic routes, the architecture of cities such as León and Granada, and most recently ecotourism and agritourism, particularly in Northern Nicaragua.

== Tourism ==
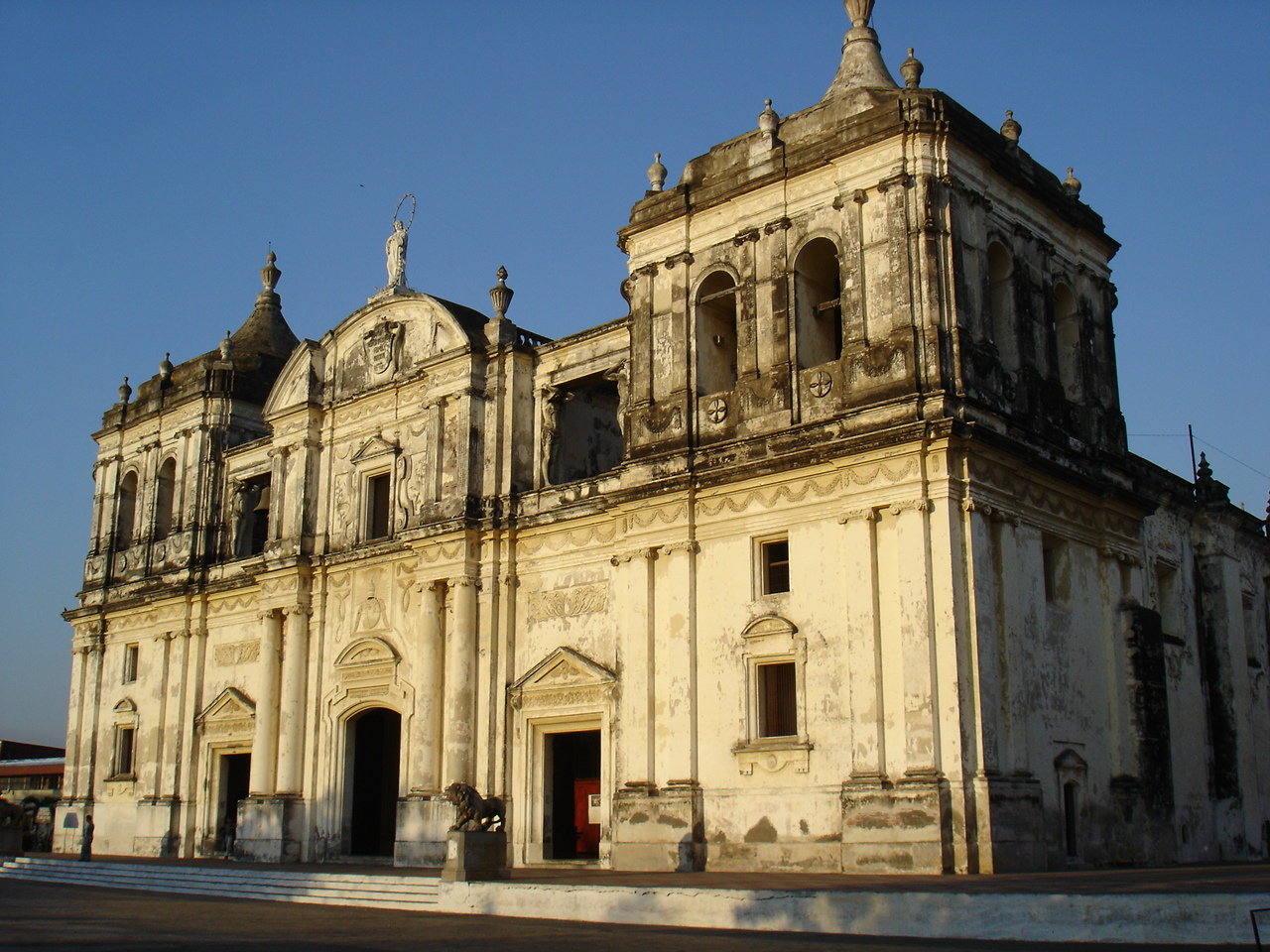
León Cathedral World Heritage Site

In 2013, more than 1.2 million tourists visited Nicaragua, representing an increase of nearly a third from 2009. Two-thirds of these tourists were from other Central American countries, 290,000 were from North America and 80,000 from Europe. Of those that come for recreation, their principal activities include surfing, hiking volcanoes and getting to know the country's nature trails.

According to the Ministry of Tourism of Nicaragua (INTUR), the colonial city of Granada is the preferred spot for tourists. The city's central park, Parqué Colón, hosts many vendors of traditional foods and arts and crafts, and there are always several horse-drawn carriages ready to give thorough and affordable tours of the city. Venturing outside of the city limits, one can explore the verdant islets of Granada by a relaxing guided boat ride or by kayak. The islets also have hotels for those that wish to take in the sunrise from the Mombacho Volcano, a common day destination for those interested in climbing into a cloud forest. The Apoyo Lagoon is also a popular destination for those visiting Granada. Also, the cities of León, Masaya, Rivas and the likes of San Juan del Sur, San Juan River, Ometepe, Mombacho Volcano, and others are the main tourist attractions. Ecotourism and surfing also attract many tourists.

Another popular destination are the Corn Islands located about 70 km east off the Caribbean coast of Nicaragua near Bluefields. They have been regarded as a "tropical paradise" by the Los Angeles Times. Cruise ships have been docking in San Juan del Sur since January 2000 and average 50,000 tourists alone every year, some who partake in tours to nearby Lake Cocibolca and the colonial city of Granada.

Nicaragua is also a very popular surfing destination, having some of the best points, reef breaks and sandbars in Central America. Its best surf breaks are in the province of Rivas. They get the south swells from the Roaring 40's averaging 3-5ft and average about 330 days of offshore winds. The most popular Nicaragua surfing beaches are those near San Juan del Sur, such as Playa Maderas and Playa Majagual. A bit farther north, Playa Gigante, Playa Amarilla and Popoyo also offer great breaks.

A view of the Montelimar Beach and the Barcelo Hotel and Resort in Managua

Nicaragua was ranked with the lowest crime rate in Latin America by Interpol and many other sources, with only 12 crimes for every 100,000 citizens. Nicaragua also holds the largest lake in Central America, about 700 species of birds, and unspoiled natural beauty. Despite all this, it is still the least visited country in the region. However, the lower number of tourists help Nicaragua keep low prices, and an "off-the-beaten-track" feel.

=== Rural and community-based tourism ===
CECOCAFEN is an organization of coffee cooperatives in Northern Nicaragua that manage a rural and community-based tourism project, which has been developed with support from Lutheran World Relief. Tourism allows farmers to receive new opportunities in alternative markets, harvest coffee and diversify their income. CECOCAFEN offers visitors the opportunity to visit a coffee farm, learn about coffee craftsmanship, and even to stay overnight on a coffee farm and explore with a community guide.

=== Ecological tourism ===
Eco-tourism aims to be ecologically and socially conscious; it focuses on local culture, wilderness, and adventure. Nicaragua's eco-tourism grows every year, as the country boasts a number of eco-tourist tours and perfect places for adventurers. Nicaragua has three eco-regions, the Pacific, Central and Atlantic, which contain volcanoes, tropical rainforest and agricultural land. The majority of ecolodges and other environmentally-focused touristic destinations are found on Ometepe Island, found in the middle of Lake Nicaragua, an hour's boat ride from Granada. While some are foreign-owned, such as the tropical permaculture lodge at Finca El Zopilote, others are owned by local families, like the small but acclaimed Finca Samaria.

Nicaragua is home to 78 protected areas covering over 20% of its landmass, and is home to 7% of the world's biodiversity. This is more than Costa Rica, which is thought to hold more natural areas than Nicaragua.

Nicaragua is also home to Bosawas, located in Northern Nicaragua, which is the largest rainforest north of the Amazon in Brazil. It also holds the largest lake in Central America, Lake Cocibolca, also known as Lake Nicaragua. Lake Cocibolca attracts a fair number of tourists yearly, most of whom visit Ometepe, a large volcanic island formed by two volcanoes in the lake. Tourists may explore the flora and fauna found in the Charco Verde Nature Reserve.

Nicaragua's rich biodiversity also attracts many tourists to protected areas such as the Indio Maíz Biological Reserve, which holds a higher number in species of trees, birds, and insects than all of Europe.

== International tourist arrivals ==
Tourist arrivals of 2024 in %

=== International airport ===
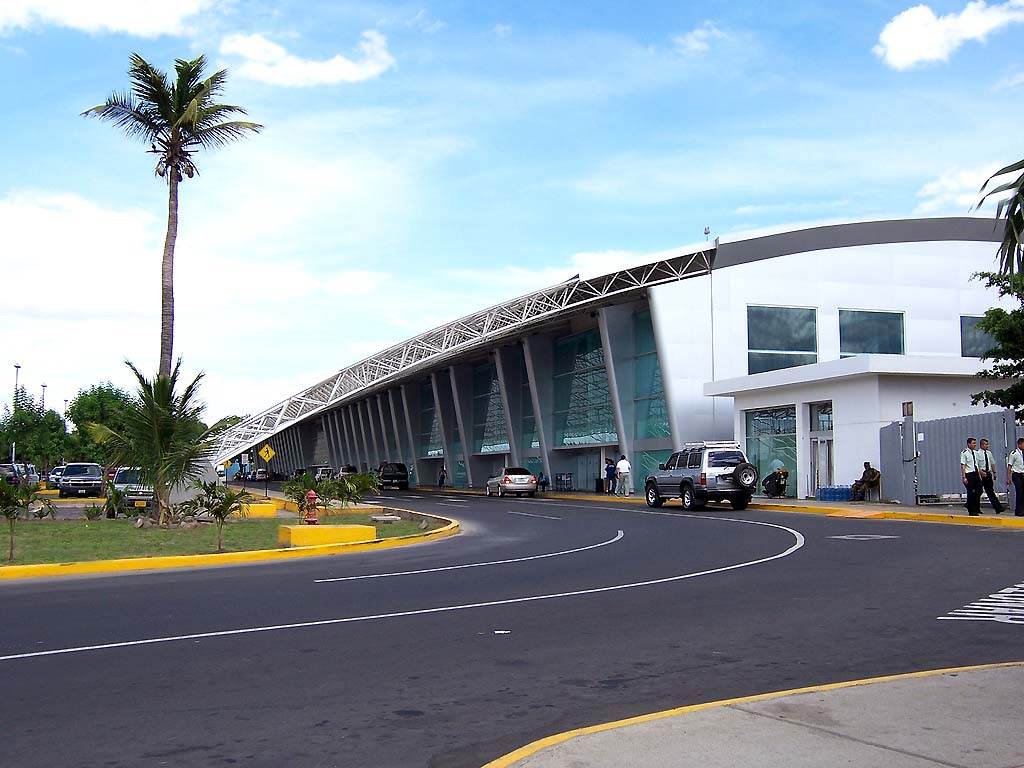
After its renovation, Nicaragua's Augusto C. Sandino International Airport stands as the most modern airport in Central America.

Nicaragua only has one international airport, the Augusto C. Sandino International Airport, located in Managua. A large expansion and renovation programme was undertaken between 2003-2006 to modernise the facilities.

=== Visa regulations ===
Tourists from Afghanistan, Albania, Angola, Armenia, Bosnia and Herzegovina, China, Cuba, Ecuador, Ghana, Haiti, India, Iraq, Jordan, Lebanon, Liberia, Mali, Mozambique, Nepal, Nigeria, North Korea, Pakistan, the Palestinian National Authority, Romania, Sierra Leone, Somalia, Sri Lanka, Sudan, Syria, Vietnam and Yemen require a visa to enter Nicaragua.

Other tourists can obtain a Tourist Card for US$10 valid for 90days upon arrival, provided with a valid passport with at least six months to run. There is also a US$32 departure tax (the tax is usually already included in a round-trip ticket).

== Tourist attractions ==
=== Volcanoes ===
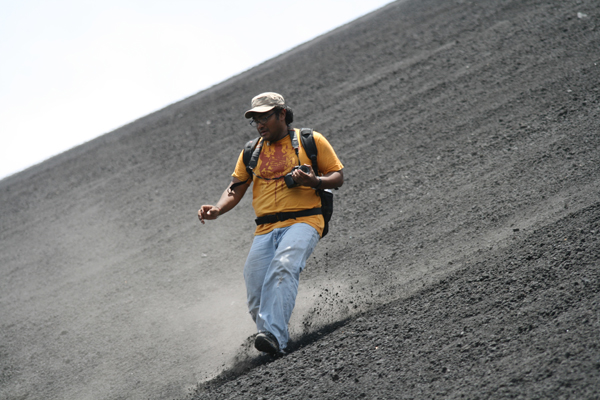
Sand skiing down the Cerro Negro volcano

Nicaragua is referred to as "the land of lakes and volcanoes" due to the number of its lagoons and lakes, and the chain of volcanoes that runs from the north to the south along the country's Pacific side. Today, only 7 of the 50 volcanoes in Nicaragua are considered active. Many of these volcanoes offer some great possibilities for tourists with activities such as hiking, climbing, camping, and swimming in crater lakes.

Sand skiing has become a popular attraction at the Cerro Negro volcano in León. Both dormant and active volcanoes can be climbed. Some of the most visited volcanoes include the Masaya Volcano, Momotombo, Mombacho, Cosigüina and Ometepe's Maderas and Concepción.

The Masaya Volcano is one of the most popular tourist attractions in Nicaragua. It is one of 18 distinct volcanic centres that make up the Nicaraguan portion of the Central American Volcanic Belt (CAVF).

The Apoyo Lagoon was created by the eruption of the Apoyo Volcano about 23,000 years ago, which left a huge 7 km-wide crater that gradually filled with water. It is surrounded by the old crater wall. The rim of the lagoon is lined with restaurants, many of which have kayaks available. Besides exploring the forest around it, many water sports are practiced in the lagoon, most notably kayaking.

Another popular attraction is the archipelago of 365 islands known as the Islets of Granada (Isletas de Granada). The islets were formed when the Mombacho volcano blew most of its cone into the lake, thereby creating the archipelago. The islets are popular with both locals and tourists. The islets differ in size and have a community of about 1200 people, most of whom make their living as fishermen. Many visitors take boat rides along the islets, which are abundant with many different species of birds and fish such as cormorants, herons, kingfisher, oropendola, hawks and many more.

== Popular destinations ==
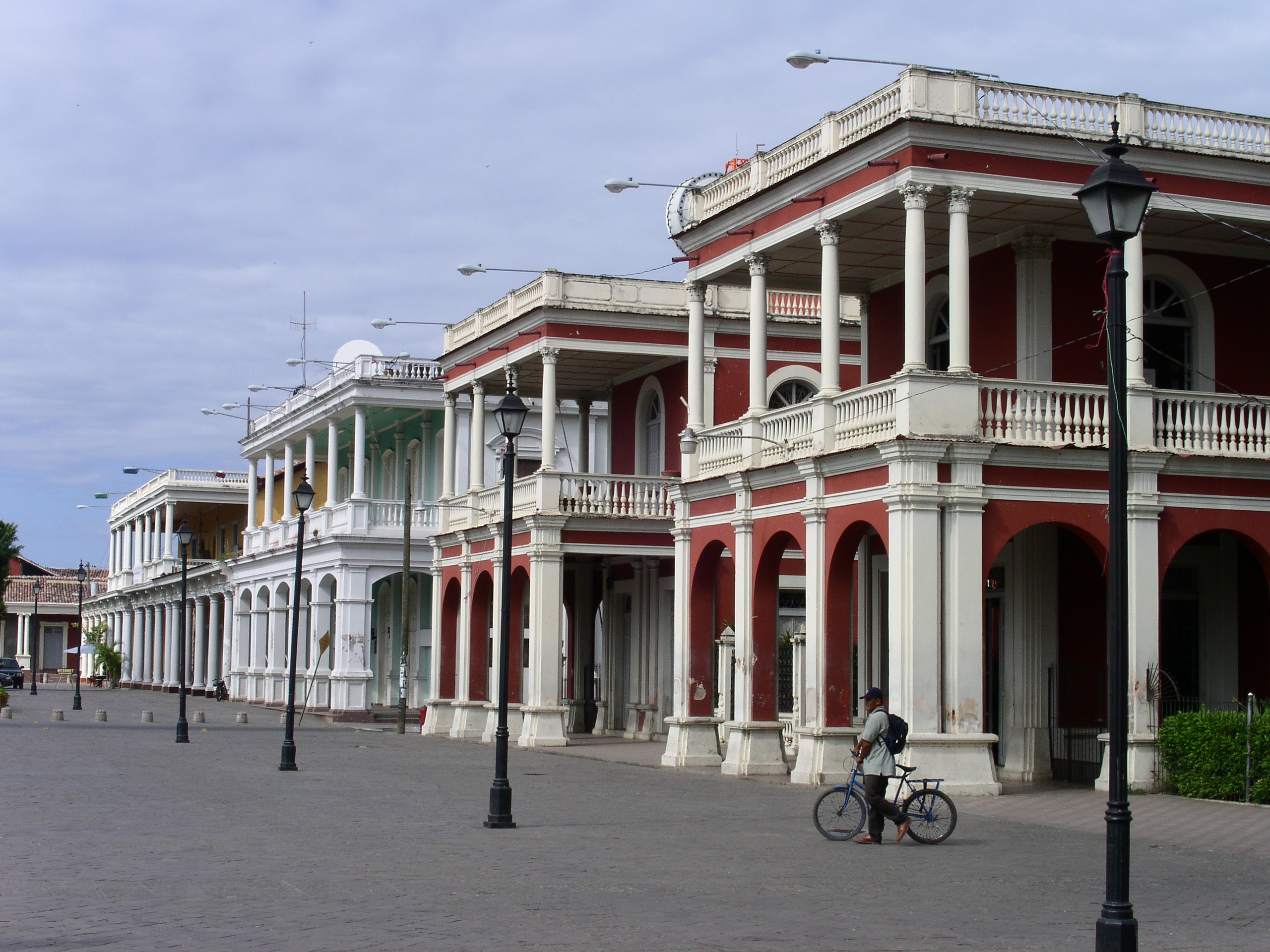
Granada's Town Square

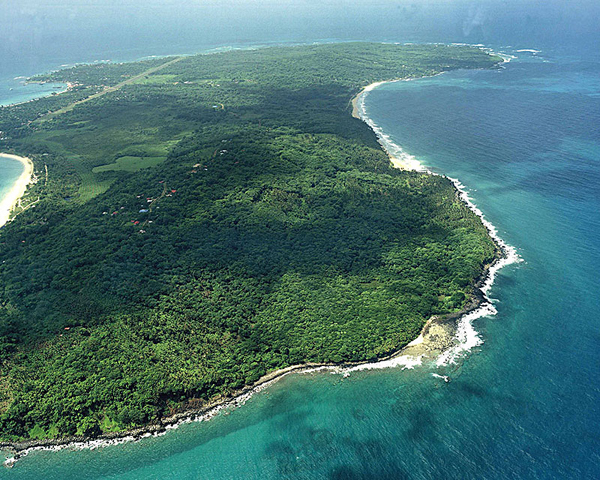
Corn Island

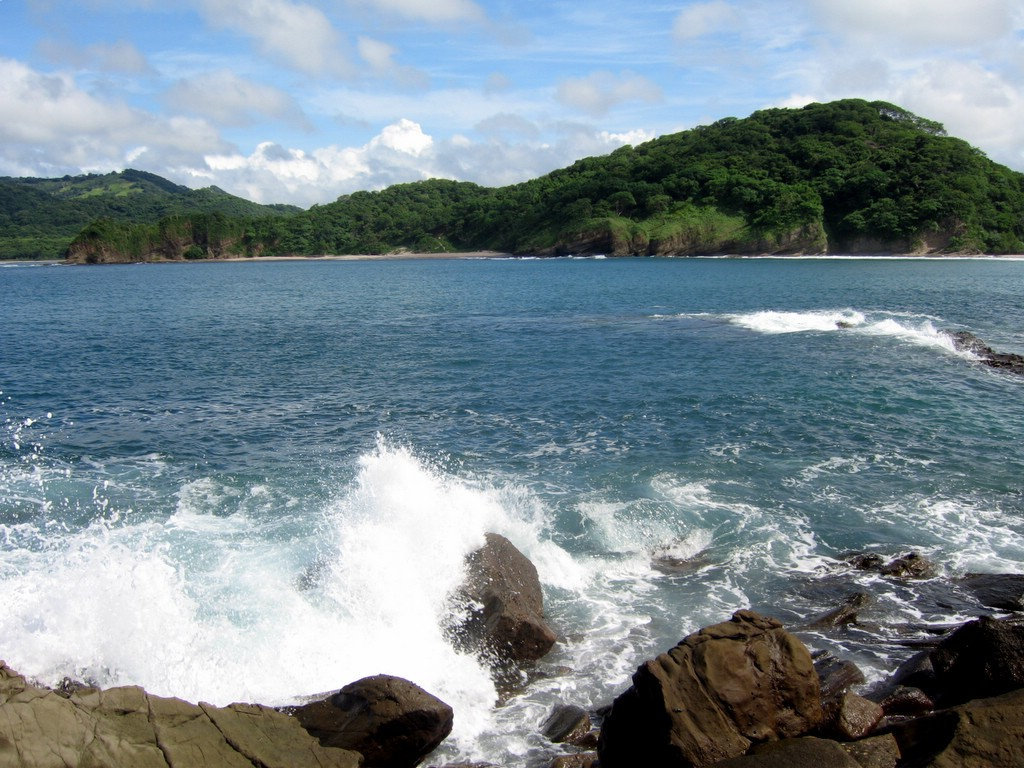
Bahia Majagual Rivas

Department of Chinandega

- Chinandega, Rum Flor de Caña tour, Marina Puesta del Sol yacht club

Department of Estelí

- Estelí, Mira Flor Nature Reserve

Department of Granada:

- Granada, Parque central, Islets of Granada

Department of Jinotega

- Jinotega, El Jaguar Cloud Forest Reserve, Lake Apanás, Reserve Naturals, Peña of Cross, Bosawás Biosphere Reserve.

Department of León

- León, Ruins of León, El Fortin, Cerro Negro, Telica

Department of Managua:

- Managua, Montelimar Beach, Mercado Roberto Huembes, Metrocentro, Pharaoh's Casino, Galerias Santo Domingo Chocoyero-El Brujo Natural Reserve

Department of Masaya:

- Apoyo Lagoon Natural Reserve, Masaya

Department of Matagalpa

- Selva Negra Mountain Resort, Selva Negra Cloud Forest Reserve

North Caribbean Coast Autonomous Region:

- Puerto Cabezas, Bosawás Biosphere Reserve

Department of Río San Juan:

- Solentiname Islands, El Castillo, San Carlos, Los Guatuzos Wildlife Refuge

Department of Rivas

- San Juan del Sur, Iguana beach, Ometepe, Zapatera Island

South Caribbean Coast Autonomous Region, Playa Gigante:

- Corn Islands, Bluefields, Laguna de Perlas, Indio Maíz Biological Reserve

== See also ==
- Economy of Nicaragua
- Museums of Nicaragua
- Protected areas of Nicaragua
- Visa policy of Nicaragua
- Wildlife of Nicaragua
