= Indio Maíz Biological Reserve =

Protected area in Nicaragua

- Reserva Biológica Indio Maíz
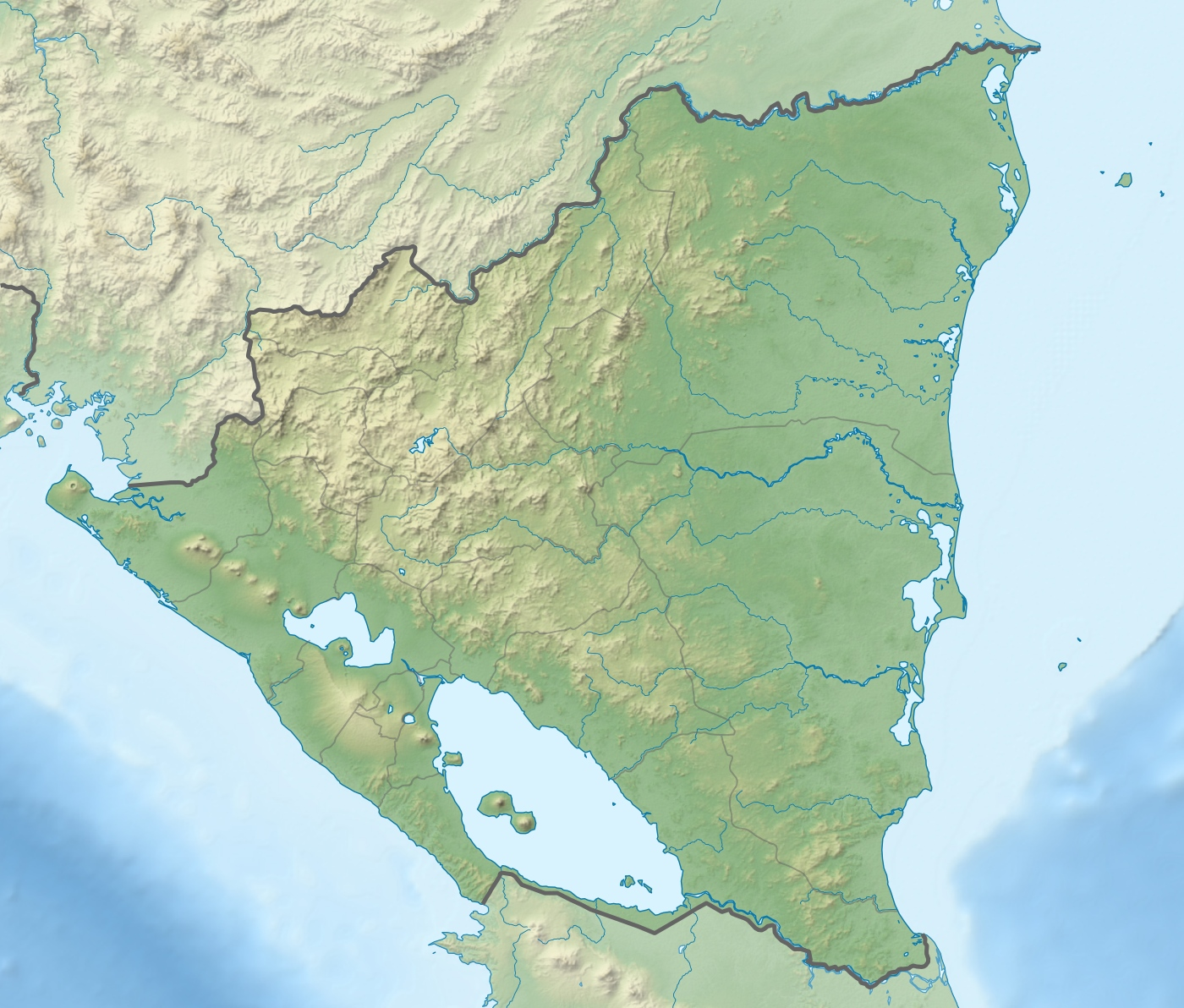
- Location within Nicaragua
- Location: Río San Juan Department and South Caribbean Coast Autonomous Region, Nicaragua
- Nearest city: Monkey Point
- Coordinates: 11°04′57″N 84°05′42″W
- Area: 263,980 ha (652,300 acres) or 2,639 km^{2} (1,019 sq mi)
- Established: 1990

Indio Maíz Biological Reserve is situated on the southeastern corner of Nicaragua bordering the San Juan River and Costa Rica. Measuring about 3,180 square kilometers, it is one of the largest protected lowland forest system in Central America, the second largest lowland rainforest reserve in Nicaragua (after Bosawás) and is a key component in the proposed Mesoamerican Biological Corridor. It has previously been referred to as "the gem of Central American nature reserves" by UCLA biologists. Indio Maíz is rich in biodiversity, holding a higher number in species of trees, birds, and insects than all of Europe. In recent years, a growing timber and oil palm industry has led to increasing rates of deforestation along the northern and western flanks of Indio Maíz.

== Overview ==
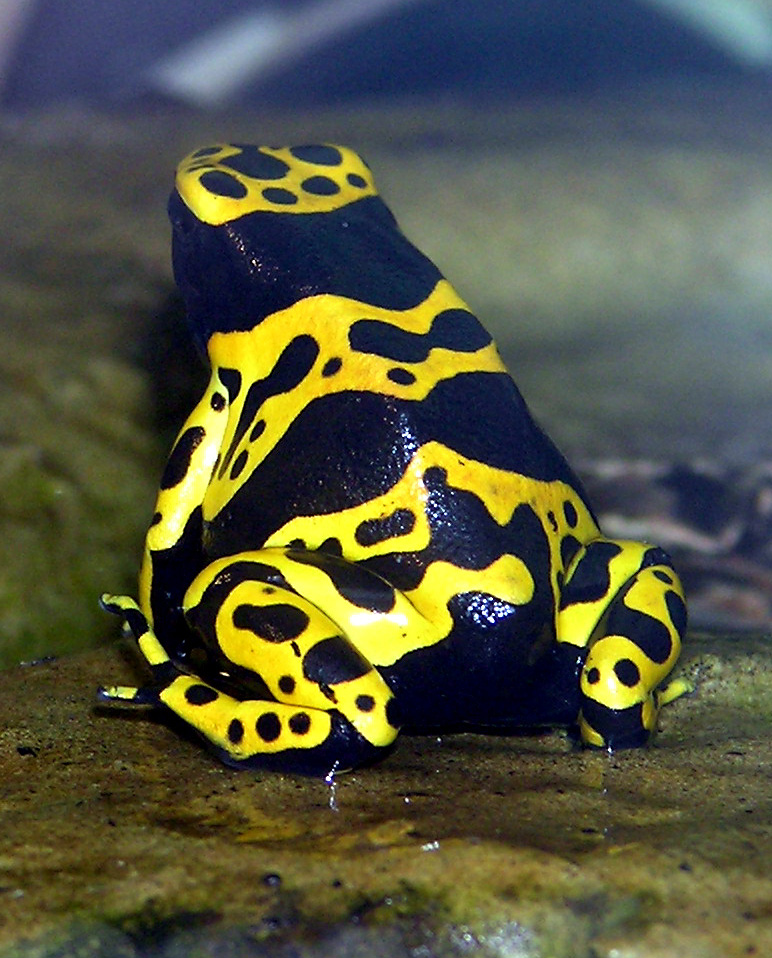
Yellow-banded poison dart frog

The Indio Maíz Biological Reserve is a remnant of the "Áreas Naturales Protegidas del Sureste de Nicaragua" established in 1990 during the first Sandinista government. The region was reorganised as the "Reserva de Biosfera del Sureste de Nicaragua" in 1999 and was split up into four smaller protected areas, after the Bosawás Biosphere Reserve had been reorganised in 1997. Seventy percent of the reserve is also part of the territory administered by the autonomous Rama-Kriol Territorial Government and is home to indigenous Rama and Kriol people. They gained the right to govern these territories by the revolutionary government in 1987, and in response to international pressure now hold deed to the land since after 2002. This presents an unforeseen legal regime for the reserve which must yet be solved. Most of the Biological Reserve is out of bounds to tourists and no hiking is permitted, only boat tours with guides at starting two locations: the Bartola River at the western border near the village of El Castillo, and Greytown. At the Bartola river entrance there is a small station with guards from the Ministry of Natural Resources (MARENA), which can be hired as guides. Native American Rama people also can be hired as guides. It is possible to stay in old abandoned wooden Rama huts along the Indian River upstream from Greytown.

The climate of the reserve is classified as humid tropical rainforest (Af) in the Köppen climate classification with a mean annual temperature around 26 °C. It receives upwards of 4,000 mm of rain annually with a long wet season lasting from May to January, followed by a shorter slightly "drier" season from February to April. The soils are nutrient-poor ultisols with poor drainage.

== Fauna ==
Indio-Maiz boasts a large number in species of both flora and fauna. It is home to 65 species of mammals including 4 species of wild cats, 221 species of birds, 55 species of reptiles, 34 species of amphibians and 149 recorded insect species. Great green macaws, Baird's tapirs (Tapirus bairdii) and jaguars (Panthera onca) have important population strongholds in the reserve.

Some of the mammals present include pumas, jaguars, armadillos, fishing bulldog bat, sloths, raccoons, collared peccary and tame manatees. Also present are several different species of monkey, most notably the white-headed capuchin, along with howler and spider monkeys.

Other rare species of bird include scarlet macaws, harpy eagle, three-wattled bellbird (Procnias tricarunculatus) and great curassow (Crax rubra). Other birds include the royal flycatcher.

Reptiles including crocodiles (Crocodylus acutus), turtles, iguanas, and snakes such as the bushmaster Lachesis muta and Bothriechis schlegelii. Among the amphibian family, there are brightly colored poison dart frogs like Oophaga pumilio and as of 2014 it is one of only three places in Nicaragua where the toad Incilius melanochlorus has been recorded. Fish like tarpon are common. The world's only freshwater shark, Nicaragua shark, known elsewhere in the world as the bull shark or Zambesi shark is also present in the San Juan River which borders the reserve. Nicaragua has recently banned freshwater shark fishing because of population declines.

== Flora ==
Floristically, Indio Maíz is comparable to that of other Caribbean lowland forests found on the eastern-facing slopes of Costa Rica including the adjacent Barra del Colorado Wildlife Refuge and Tortuguero National Park, located immediately south of the reserve. Some of the woody species found include: Astronium graveolens, Carpotroche platyptera, Clavija jelskii, Luehea seemanii, Mansoa hymenaea, Posoqueria latifolia, and Sorocea affinis. The palms Bactris hondurensis, Cryosophila warscewiczii, and Desmoncus sp. are found within the reserve.

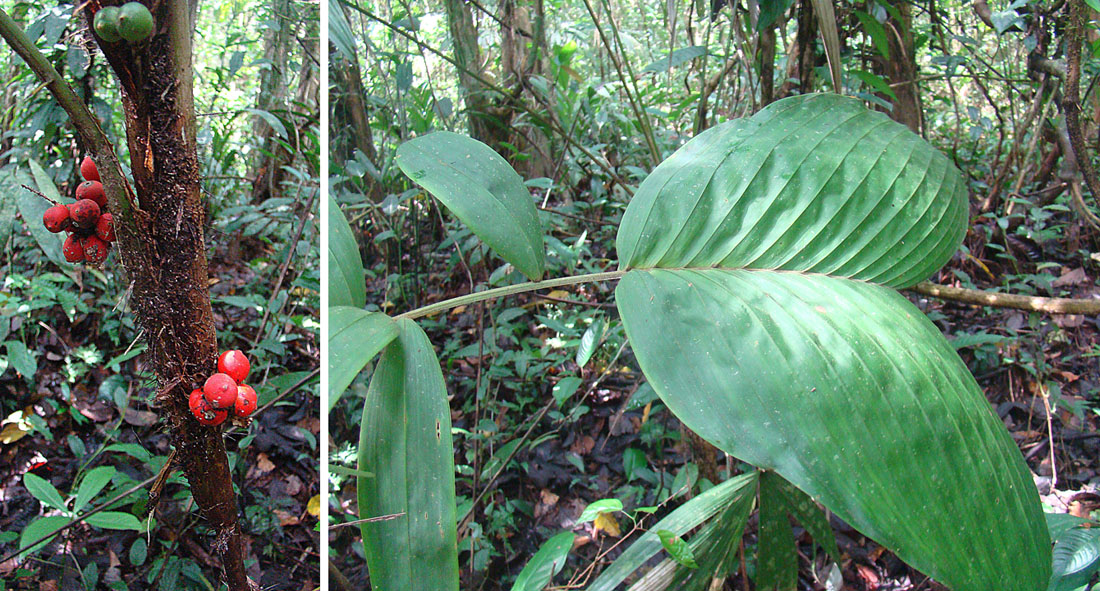
Bactris hondurensis found growing in the understory.

Several species of herbaceous plants can be found in the understory, including the common Heliconia latispatha. One of the largest species of Neotropical Araceae, Dracontium gigas, can also be found here. Like other tropical lowland forests throughout Central America, epiphytic plants are also found in abundance. There is also a diverse array of ferns and lycopods present, such as Selaginella eurynota.

== Threats ==
The reserve is threatened by encroaching agricultural development as land is being developed into oil palm and cattle pasture by settlers from the east. In the mid-1990s villages developed in the interior of the reserve, these were evicted in 2001, but since 2010 deforestation has returned. As of 2015 some 600 families are believed to inhabit the centre of the reserve. A number of groups have organised together as the " Unión de Organizaciones Ambientalistas" (UOA) in 2015 to coordinate a response, including the indigenous territorial government, Fundación del Río, two local cocoa-farming cooperatives, a tourism cooperative and the municipal network for water and sanitation. They would like the government to send in the army and police. In 2018 this group formed the "Batallón Cívico Indio-Maíz".

Hurricane Otto of November 2016, which crossed Central America into the Pacific directly through the Nicaragua-Costa Rica border region, has had a large effect on the woodlands and communities of the region.

In early April 2018, forest fires burned 13,500 acres (5,500 hectares) of the Indio Maiz Biological Reserve. Dead wood left in the forests after the hurricane in 2016 may have fuelled the fires. Environmental and indigenous rights activists protested what they saw as an inadequate government response on the part of the Ortega-Murillo administration. Counterprotests supported the Sandinista Front government.

== See also ==
- Wildlife of Nicaragua
- Tourism in Nicaragua
- Protected areas of Nicaragua
