= Miskito pine forests =

Central American ecological zone

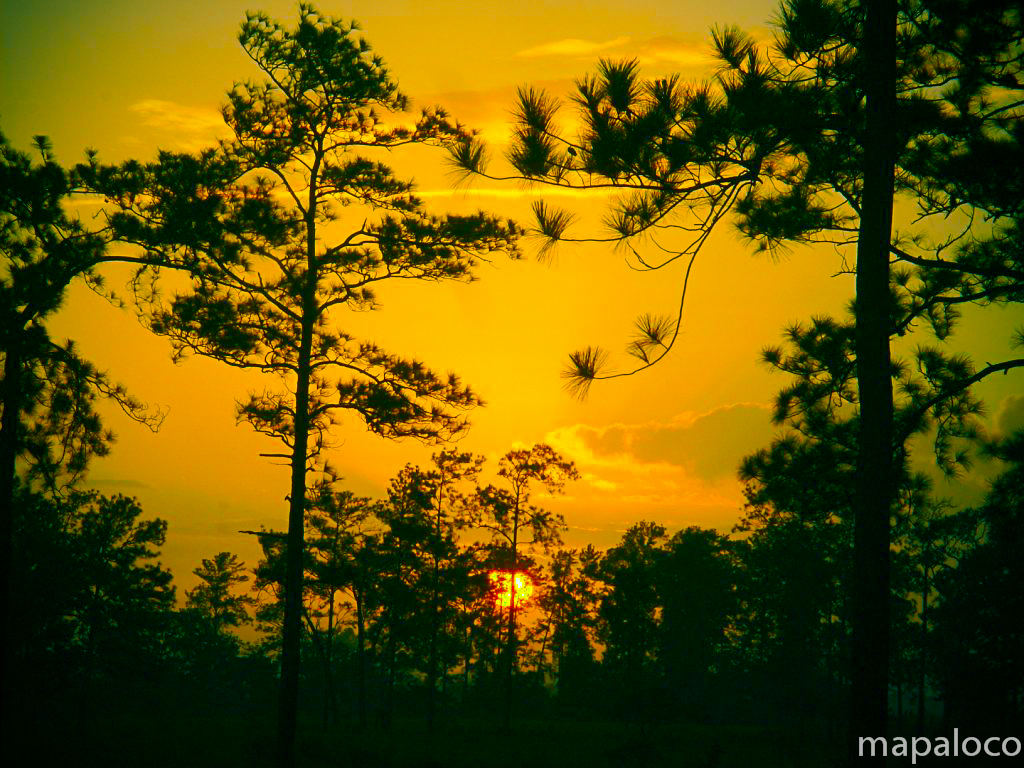
- Near Prinzapolka River, eastern Nicaragua

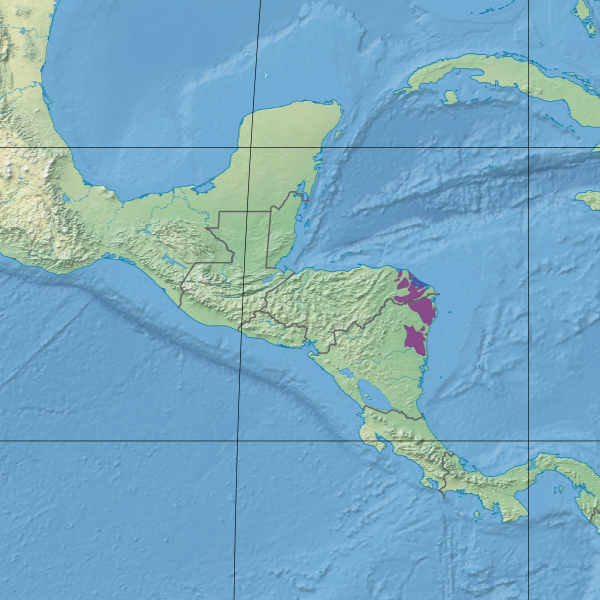
- Ecoregion territory (in purple)

Ecology
- Realm: Neotropic
- Biome: Tropical and subtropical coniferous forests

Geography
- Area: 18,965 km^{2} (7,322 sq mi)
- Country: Honduras, Nicaragua
- Coordinates: 13.75°N 83.75°W

The Miskito pine forests ecoregion (WWF ID: NT0306) covers lowland pine forests and savanna along much of the Mosquito Coast in northeastern Nicaragua and southeastern Honduras. Pines are adapted to grow in the poor soil, relative to the surrounding moist forest, and repeated burning have left one species – the Caribbean pine – dominant. Although the ecoregion receives high levels of rain (over 2,500 mm/year), the hard soils, repeated burning, and exposure to hurricanes have left expanses of 'pine savanna' and seasonal wetlands. The area is thinly settled by humans and there is little crop agriculture.

== Location and description ==
The northern section of the ecoregion is centered on the Coco River that separates Honduras from Nicaragua. A strip of land on the northern side of the river is in the Central American Atlantic moist forests ecoregion, as is most of the territory to the west where the soil and rainfall are richer. The ecoregion reaches 160 km inland on the southern side of the Coco River. The southern section reaches almost to Pearl Lagoon halfway down the east coast of Nicaragua. Along the coast where there are salt-water wetlands the ecoregion grades into the Mesoamerican Gulf-Caribbean mangroves ecoregion.

== Climate ==
The climate of the ecoregion is Tropical monsoon climate (Köppen climate classification (Am)). This climate is characterized by relatively even temperatures throughout the year (all months being greater than 18 °C (64 °F) average temperature), and a pronounced dry season. The driest month has less than 60 mm of precipitation, but more than (100-(average/25) mm. This climate is mid-way between a tropical rainforest and a tropical savanna. Precipitation averages 2,500 mm/year. The pronounced dry season runs from mid-February to May.

== Flora and fauna ==
Much of the area is savanna-like, with shrub cover and open forest covering almost a third of the territory. 30% is closed forest, mostly broadleaf evergreen, and 30% is herbaceous wetlands. Pines are found more commonly on the higher, better drained ground, with islands of palmetto and scrub in the open areas. The wetlands include seasonally inundated flats with shrub and palmettos, and poorly-drained areas over clay soil supporting sedges and palmettos. The "bush line" that separates the savanna-like pine forest from the taller evergreen moist forest of the interior is relatively abrupt, following a line a richer soil rather than topography.

Historically, expanses of open territory were maintained by burning. The dry season in February-May was accompanied by fast ground fires that burned off the cover without killing the roots of grasses and sedges, which then sprouted with the increase in showers. The area is also affected by the hurricane season that peaks in September and October.

== Protected areas ==
Approximately 16% of the ecoregion is officially protected. These protected areas include:

- Río Plátano Biosphere Reserve
- Llanos de Karawala Natural Reserve
- Cabo Viejo-Tala-Sulamas Natural Reserve
