= Ticuantepe =

Ticuantepe Tēkwāntepēk
- Municipality
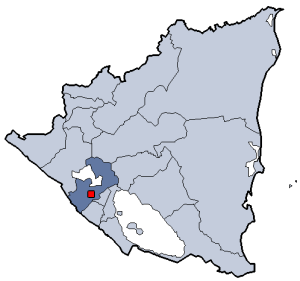

- Location in Nicaragua
- Coordinates: 12°1′N 86°12′W
- Country: Nicaragua
- Department: Managua

Area
  - Municipality: 23.5 sq mi (60.8 km^{2})

Population (2022 estimate)
  - Municipality: 39,012
  - Density: 1,660/sq mi (642/km^{2})
  - Urban: 18,070

Ticuantepe (Nawat: Tēkwāntepēk), is a town and a municipality in the Managua department of Nicaragua with an estimated population of 39,012. The municipality is named after the Nahua chiefdom of Tekwantepek which was located in the modern municipality of Ticuantepe and the surrounding area. According to Spanish conquistador and historian Gonzalo Fernández de Oviedo y Valdés, Tekwantepek was a militarily strong chiefdom that was one of the last to fall to the conquistadors and their central-Mexican allies. The Nahuas chose to settle in Ticuantepe due to its highly rich agriculture. Located on the slopes of the Meseta de los Pueblos, its fertile volcanic soils and cooler microclimate made it an exceptionally productive area for the Nahuas to grow maize, cacao, beans, and avocados.

== Etymology ==
Ticuantepe originates from the Nawat language of the Nicarao people who settled and inhabited the area. It's named after the Nahua chiefdom of Tekwantepek, which is a combination of the Nawat words tēkwāni (jaguar), and tepēk (hill), therefore the translation of Tekwantepek is "hill of jaguars" or "jaguar hill".

== Overview ==
Ticuantepe has the largest underground aquifer in the nation, and is the largest supplier of pineapples to all of Nicaragua. Ticuantepe has an estimated population of 37,545, 44.7% of which live in urban zones and 55.3% in rural zones. The town has a nice "pueblo" feel to it. It is one of the safer areas of Nicaragua and is located just 20 minutes from downtown Managua. There is easy transportation to and from Ticuantepe to most of Nicaragua by bus, microbus and moto-taxi. Located just 20 minutes from Managua and from Masaya as well as only 35 minutes from Granada, it is central but at the same time, has a rural environment. The volcano "Volcan Masaya" is about 15 minutes away.

== Flora and fauna ==
Located in Ticuantepe is Chocoyero Nature Reserve, which is the smallest protected area in Nicaragua at just 455 acres (1.84 km^{2}). Chocoyero is a tropical rainforest and is abundant in water. It is home to two waterfalls, El Brujo and Chocoyero, named after the Pacific parakeets that make the walls of the cliff their home, they are locally known as Chocoyos.

Chocoyero is home to an estimated 113 bird species, 29 species of mammals and 21 types of reptiles and amphibians.

=== Tourism ===
Chocoyero Nature Reserve is regarded as an important tourist attraction. Each year an estimated 10,000 people visit the reserve. There are wild howler monkeys as well as a vast array of flora and fauna and two waterfalls. It is a two-hour hike around the reserve and most people travel in and out of the reserve by moto-taxi. It is about 7 kilometers off of the main road. There are a handful of clean hotels and restaurants. The main hotels are Viva Guesthouse and The Chocoyo and both have pools and are secure. The restaurant Las Pitahayas is well known throughout most of Nicaragua and is located in Ticuantepe. There is one Spanish language school located in Ticuantepe; Ticuantepe Spanish School, operated by Nicaragua Spanish Schools. It is well integrated into the community.

Ticuantepe has been a sister city of Milwaukee, Wisconsin. Milwaukee residents collected aid shipments for Ticuantepe during the years of the Sandinista government, with a focus on medical supplies. After 1990, Milwaukee's aid shipments fell off as a result of the imposition of custom charges, and around 2005, the sister city relationship was discontinued.

== See also ==
- Protected areas of Nicaragua
- Wildlife of Nicaragua
- Managua
