= Yulu =

Yulu may refer to the following.

== People ==
- Yulu people
- Tuoba Yulü
- Jiao Yulu
- Bai Yulu
- Christian Yulu
- Jeanvion Yulu-Matondo
- Du Yulu
- Chen Yulu
- Yulu (viceroy) (裕禄), Viceroy of Liangjiang in 1884 and 1887

== Transportation ==
- Yulu (transportation company), an Indian transportation company
- Yulu station, Chongqing Rail Transit station in China
- Yulu EV2, or Geely LC, a vehicle

== Other ==
- Yulu language
- Yulü, one of the Chinese door gods
- Yulu Natural Reserve, a national reserve in Nicaragua
