= Chocoyero-El Brujo Natural Reserve =

Nature reserve in Nicaragua

Coordinates: 12.0167°N 86.2000°W

Chocoyero Natural Reserve
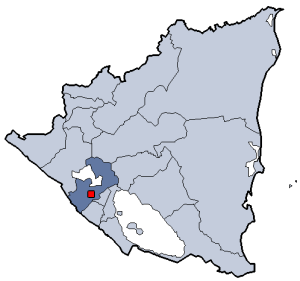
- Location of Chocoyero Natural Reserve in Nicaragua
- Interactive map of Chocoyero Natural Reserve
- Location: Ticuantepe, Nicaragua
- Nearest city: Managua
- Area: 455 acres (1.8 km^{2})
- Visitors: 10,000 (est.) (in 2006)
- Governing body: Ministry of the Environment and Natural Resources (MARENA)

Chocoyero-El Brujo Natural Reserve (Spanish: Reserva Natural El Chocoyero-El Brujo) is located in the municipality of Ticuantepe in the Managua department of Nicaragua. Chocoyero-El Brujo is one of 78 protected areas in Nicaragua, and at just 455 acres (1.8 km^{2}) this tropical forest is one of the smallest in size. Chocoyero-El Brujo was declared a natural reserve in 1993 is managed by the Ministry of the Environment and Natural Resources (MARENA).

== Flora and fauna ==
Chocoyero-El Brujo is abundant in water, it is home to two waterfalls, El Brujo and Chocoyero, named after the parakeets that make the walls of the cliff their home. The abundance of water keeps this natural reserve green with flourishing wildlife. Chocoyero-El Brujo is a main supplier of water to Managua, it supplies 20% of the city's water consumption and about twenty million gallons of water each day.

The large amount of biodiversity is obvious, with bird species estimated at 113 species, some of which include toucans, hummingbirds, and green Pacific parakeets (Aratinga strenua) known as chocoyos nationwide. In the reserve, there are 29 species of mammals and 21 types of reptiles and amphibians. Among mammals and amphibians some species regularly spotted include tigrillos, agoutis, and deer. Also common are two types of monkeys, the howler and the smaller white-face monkeys.

Also present are 154 species of plants and 217 species of vertebrates.

== Tourism ==
Chocoyero-El Brujo Natural Reserve is regarded as an important tourist attraction. Each year an estimated 10,000 people visit the reserve. The reserve includes various activities for visitors such as bird watching, bicycling, overnight camping, guided tours, and an EnviroCamp.

== See also ==
- Protected areas of Nicaragua
- Wildlife of Nicaragua
- Tourism in Nicaragua
