= National System of Protected Areas =

National System of Protected Areas (Spanish: Sistema Nacional de Áreas Protegidas) (SINAP or SNAP) may refer to:

- National System of Protected Areas (Colombia), the Colombian national parks administrator
- National System of Protected Areas (Nicaragua), the Nicaraguan national parks administrator
- National System of Protected Areas in Uruguay, the Uruguayan national parks administrator
