= Los Guatuzos Wildlife Refuge =

Protected area in Nicaragua

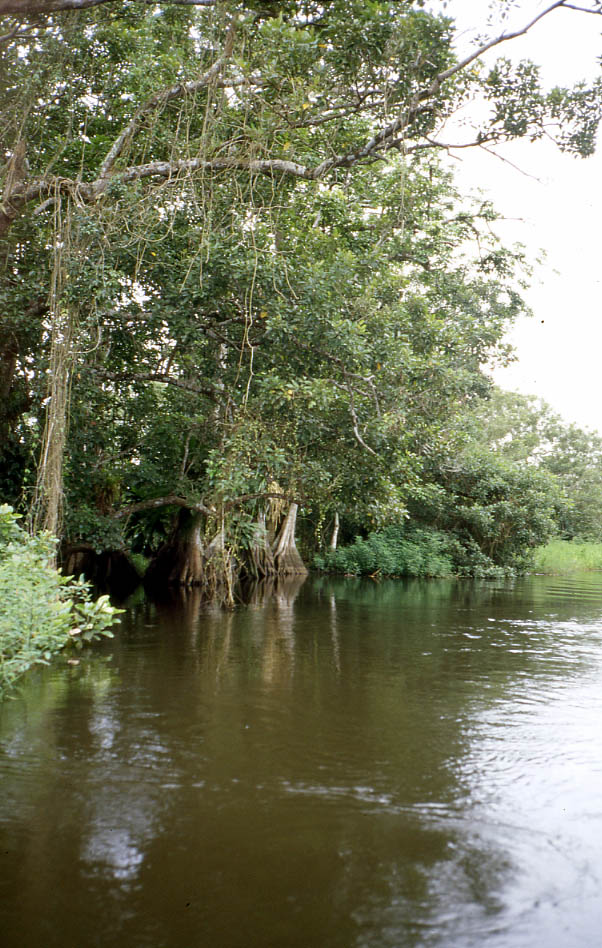
- Los Guatuzos

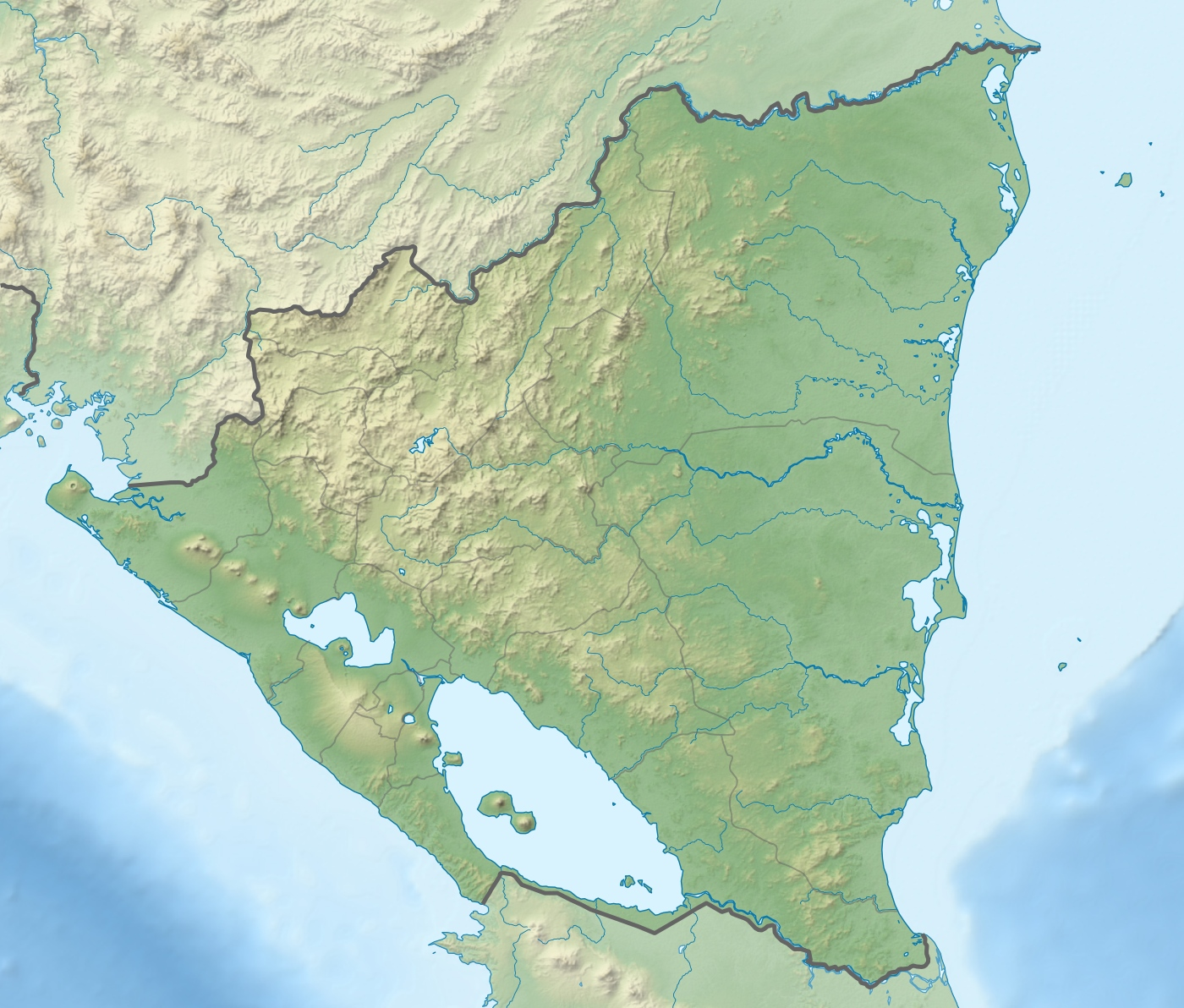
- Location within Nicaragua
- Location: south Nicaragua
- Coordinates: 10°59′31″N 84°54′25″W
- Area: 437.5 km^{2} (168.9 mi^{2})

Ramsar Wetland
- Official name: Los Guatuzos
- Designated: 30 July 1997
- Reference no.: 915

Los Guatuzos Wildlife Refuge (Spanish: Refugio de Vida Silvestre Los Guatuzos) has an area of 437.5 km^{2} (168.9 mi^{2}) and is located south of Lake Nicaragua and west of the San Juan River in Nicaragua. Los Guatuzos is a protected area consisting of tropical wetlands, rainforest, and wildlife refuge, it is the only internationally registered tropical wetland area in Nicaragua.

== Overview ==
The site has been catalogued by UNESCO as a biosphere reserve and belongs to the list of cenagales (wetlands) of international importance of Ramsar Convention. The refuge comprises the Ecological Center of Los Guatuzos, a research center that offers guided visits, excursions and lodging in the park. It also has a butterfly farm, turtle and caiman nursery, and an orchid display of 92 different species.

== Flora and fauna ==
Los Guatuzos is rich in flora and fauna. The number of recorded species of birds living in the wildlife refuge is recorded at over 389, which doesn't include the thousands of migratory birds that frequently visit the refuge. Some of the commonly spotted animals include caimans, crocodiles, jaguars, monkeys and feral pigs. Also present in the refuge are the ancient species of fish, although spotting them is rare. The Atractosteus tropicus, or gaspar, has fangs and a snout that help it consume other species of fish as well as turtles and crabs.

With regards to the fauna, 81 species of Amphibians, 136 species of reptile and 42 species of mammals are found in the park.

=== Botany ===
A total of twelve rivers pass through the reserve. A total of 315 species of plants exist including 130 Orchidaceae.

== See also ==
- Wildlife of Nicaragua
- Tourism in Nicaragua
- Protected areas of Nicaragua
- World Network of Biosphere Reserves
