= Cerro Arenal Natural Reserve =

Protected area in Nicaragua

Cerro Arenal Natural Reserve (Spanish: Reserva Natural Cerro Arenal) is a natural reserve with an area of 14.28 square kilometres in the Cordillera Dariense, it is located in the Matagalpa department in central Nicaragua.

The Cerro Arenal Natural Reserve was declared a protected area on November 4, 1991, it compromises one of 78 protected areas of Nicaragua and is managed by Ministry of the Environment and Natural Resources (MARENA).

The highest point in the reserve is located inside a tropical cloud forest 1,570 meters above sea level, rain occurs 8 months annually, between May and December. Cerro Arenal Natural Reserve is one of the smallest protected areas of Nicaragua and is abundant with flora and fauna. Many animals are present throughout the reserve, animals such as monkeys, and armadillos. The reserve also contains the oldest oak trees in Central America.
