= Magnolia sororum =

Conservation status
- Near Threatened (IUCN 3.1)

Scientific classification
- Kingdom: Plantae
- Clade: Embryophytes
- Clade: Tracheophytes
- Clade: Spermatophytes
- Clade: Angiosperms
- Clade: Magnoliids
- Order: Magnoliales
- Family: Magnoliaceae
- Genus: Magnolia
- Section: Magnolia sect. Magnolia
- Species: M. sororum

Binomial name
- Magnolia sororum Seibert

Species of flowering plant

Magnolia sororum is a species of flowering plant in the family Magnoliaceae. It is commonly known as vaco. It is native to the mountain forests of Costa Rica and western Panama, and may range into Nicaragua.

== Description ==
Magnolia sororum is a large tree, growing up to 40 meters tall.

== Range and habitat ==
Magnolia sororum is native to the mountains of Costa Rica and western Panama, including the Cordillera Central and Cordillera de Talamanca. The species' estimated extent of occurrence (EOO) is around 20,000 km^{2}. A population was reported in Bosawas Biosphere Reserve in northern Nicaragua. If confirmed, this population would extend the species' EOO to around 60,000 km^{2}.

It is found in mature humid upper montane forests from 2,300 to 3,200 meters elevation. In Panama its range extends into lower montane forests.

== Subspecies ==
There are two accepted subspecies:

- Magnolia sororum subsp. lutea Vazquez – Costa Rica
- Magnolia sororum subsp. sororum – Honduras, Southeastern Mexico, Nicaragua, Panama

== Uses ==
Its wood is used for fuelwood, charcoal, timber, and handicrafts.
