= Estero Padre Ramos Natural Reserve =

Protected area in Nicaragua

- IUCN category IV (habitat/species management area)
- Interactive map of Estero Padre Ramos Natural Reserve
- Location: Chinandega department, Nicaragua
- Nearest city: Chinandega
- Coordinates: 12.810°N 87.482°W
- Area: 91.57 square kilometres (35.36 mi^{2})
- Established: 1983
- Governing body: Ministry of the Environment and Natural Resources (MARENA)

The Padre Ramos Estuary Natural Reserve (Spanish: Reserva Natural Estero Padre Ramos) is located on the northwest Pacific coast of Nicaragua, in the municipality El Viejo in the department of Chinandega. It is one of 78 protected areas of Nicaragua and is managed by Ministry of the Environment and Natural Resources (MARENA). Estero Padre Ramos consists of a large mangrove estuary surrounded by several small beach communities, the largest of which is the town of Padre Ramos. The area's natural environment is home to a number of species of migratory and resident birds, fishes, crustaceans, sea turtles and other wildlife. While increasing in popularity as a tourist destination, tourism remains relatively well controlled in the area.

== Information on the Reserve ==
Estero Padre Ramos Natural Reserve was declared as a protected area on September 9, 1983. The Reserve encompasses approximately 92 km2 of coastal ecosystems. The estuary is among the most pristine ecosystems along Nicaragua's Pacific coast, and consists of a number of lagoons and inlets, which are dominated by large tracts of mangroves. Other eco-types include mudflats, sandy beaches and rocky reefs. A number of small communities border the estuary and local people benefit from the area’s high natural resource abundance. The area also hosts livestock rearing, shrimp farming and agricultural activities.

== Critical Hawksbill Sea Turtle Habitat ==
Estero Padre Ramos is also one of two primary hawksbill sea turtle (Eretmochelys imbricata) nesting habitats in the eastern Pacific Ocean. The hawksbill is one of only three sea turtle species listed as Critically Endangered (CR) on the World Conservation Union’s (IUCN) Red List of Threatened Species. In the eastern Pacific Ocean, the species is extremely rare and as recently as 2007 most researchers thought hawksbills had been completely eliminated in this region of the world.

The discovery of hawksbill nesting in Estero Padre Ramos and Bahia Jiquilisco (El Salvador) changed the conservation outlook for this imperiled population and has provided renewed hope for recovery. Each season approximately 150–300 hawksbills emerge from the sea to nest along the shores of Estero Padre Ramos, representing approximately 50% of all known hawksbill nesting in the entire eastern Pacific. Jiquilisco bay is not only important for hawksbill nesting, its inner channels are also critical foraging habitats species. Residence of hawksbills year-round in the estuary, which is in stark contrast to the coral reef habitats the species is known to inhabit in other regions of the world, represents a new life-history paradigm for the species. The Eastern Pacific Hawksbill Initiative works at the site in conjunction with local community groups and non-profit organizations to research and protect hawksbills and their nests. There are also nestings beaches for the olive ridley sea turtle. There is a private sea turtle rescue project at Jiquilillo managed by the MSV Nicaragua.
