= El Arenal Natural Reserve =

Protected area in Nicaragua

- Reserva Natural El Arenal
- Location: Nicaragua
- Area: 5.75 square kilometres (2.22 sq mi)

El Arenal Natural Reserve (Spanish: Reserva Natural El Arenal) is a natural reserve with an area of 5.75 km^{2} (2.22 sq mi). It is located in the Matagalpa department in central Nicaragua. The government permits small settlements and farmers to stay in the region within the reserve.

El Arenal comprises one of 78 protected areas of Nicaragua and is managed by Ministry of the Environment and Natural Resources (MARENA).
