= Asososca Lagoon Natural Reserve =

Nature reserve in Nicaragua

Asososca Lagoon Natural Reserve. It provides potable water to the city of Managua, capital of Nicaragua
- Interactive map of Asososca Lagoon Natural Reserve. It provides potable water to the city of Managua, capital of Nicaragua
- Location: La Paz Centro
- Nearest city: León
- Coordinates: 12°08′14″N 86°18′56″W
- Governing body: Ministry of the Environment and Natural Resources

Asososca Lagoon Natural Reserve is a nature reserve in Nicaragua. It is one of the 78 reserves that are under official protection in the country.
