= La Paz Centro =

- Municipality
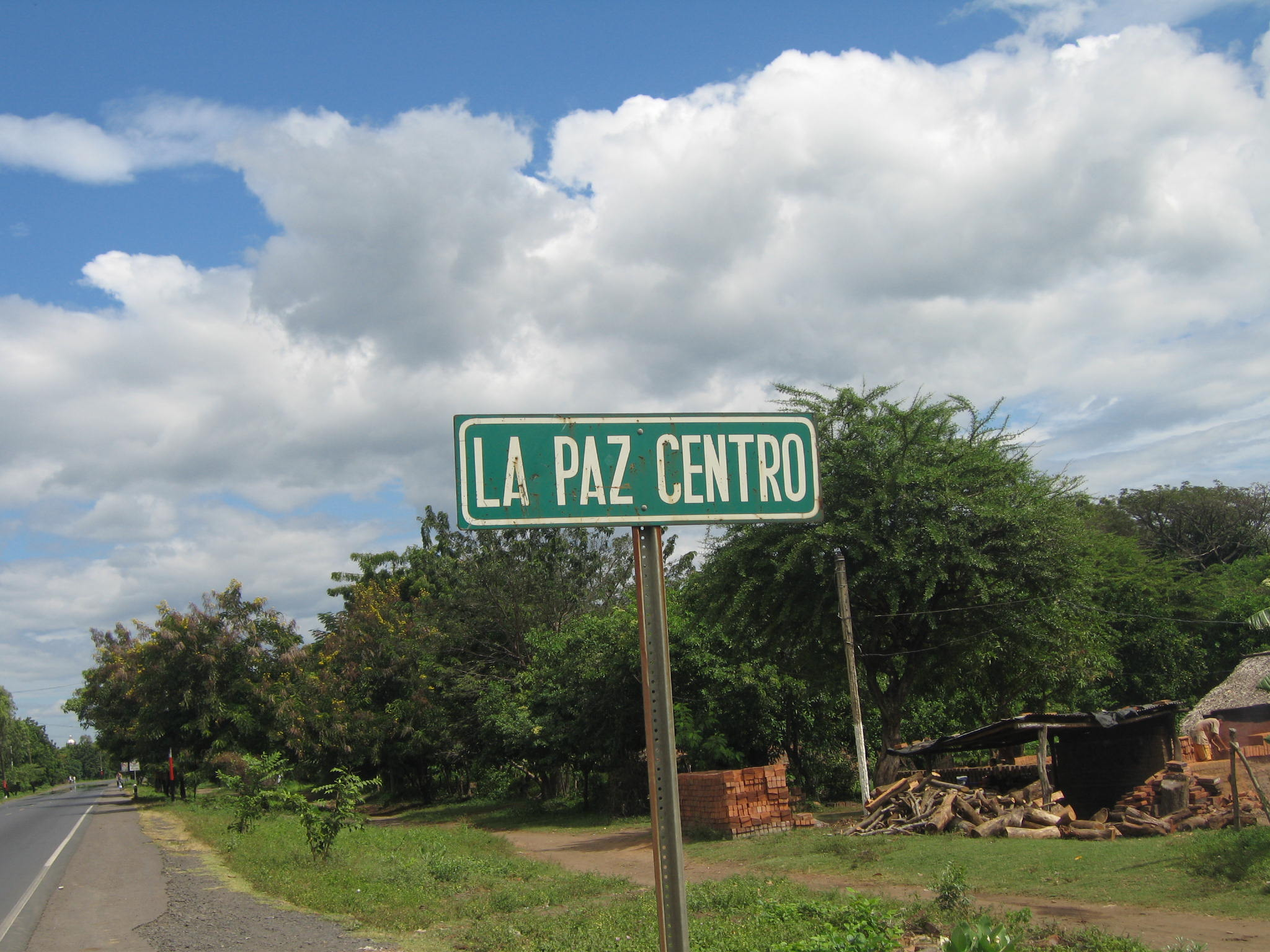

- Location in Nicaragua
- Coordinates: 12°20′24″N 86°40′31″W
- Country: Nicaragua
- Department: León Department

Area
  - Municipality: 692 km^{2} (267 sq mi)

Population (2022 estimate)
  - Municipality: 32,614
  - Density: 47.1/km^{2} (122/sq mi)
  - Urban: 23,691
- Time zone: UTC−6 (Central (CST))

La Paz Centro (Spanish pronunciation: [la pas ˈsentɾo]) is a town and a municipality in the León Department of Nicaragua.

The town is located along the highway between Managua and León. The small municipality is known for its small shops and pottery. La Paz Centro is the home of the Asososca Lagoon Natural Reserve, which is one of the few water reserves in Nicaragua that remains uncontaminated. For decades, La Paz Centro and the bordering town Nagarote have been in a feud about which town makes the best quesillos.

The town was the site of a battle between American Marines and Nicaraguan Liberal rebels in the aftermath of the Nicaraguan Civil War (1926–1927) on May 16, 1927, prior to the Sandino Rebellion.
