= Yulu Natural Reserve =

Nature reserve in Nicaragua

Coordinates: 14.0744°N 83.645314°W

Yulu Natural Reserve is a nature reserve in Nicaragua. It is one of the 78 reserves that are under official protection in the country.

The Yulu Nature Reserve is located in the autonomous region of the North Caribbean Coast, west of the Puerto Cabezas municipality. It was declared a protected area through Decree 42–91, published in La Gaceta No. 207 on November 4, 1991. It has an area of 1,000 hectares (44.19 km2). It is managed by Ministerio del Ambiente y Los Recursos Naturales (MARENA, Ministry of the Environment and Natural Resources).

It has pine forest, highlighting the pinus caribaea species and some low-density broadleaf species. The soils are of low fertility, imperfect drainage, with a high content of aluminum and a low percentage of organic matter. The climate is very humid tropical with a precipitation range of approximately 3,300 mm per year and a fluctuating temperature.
