= Tepesomoto–Pataste Nature Reserve =

Nature reserve in Nicaragua

- Reserva Natural Tepesomoto Pataste
- IUCN category VI (protected area with sustainable use of natural resources)
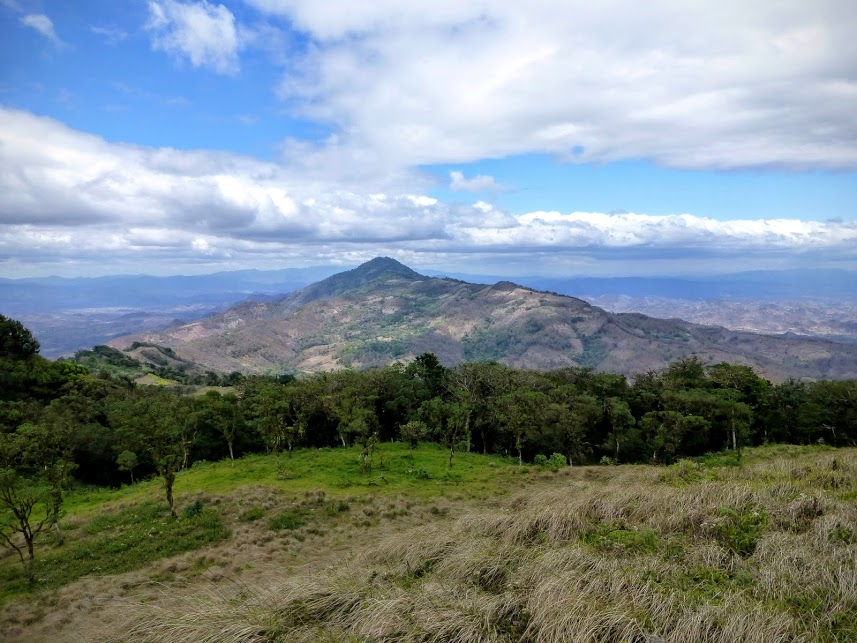
- Tepesomoto volcano, viewed from the south side.

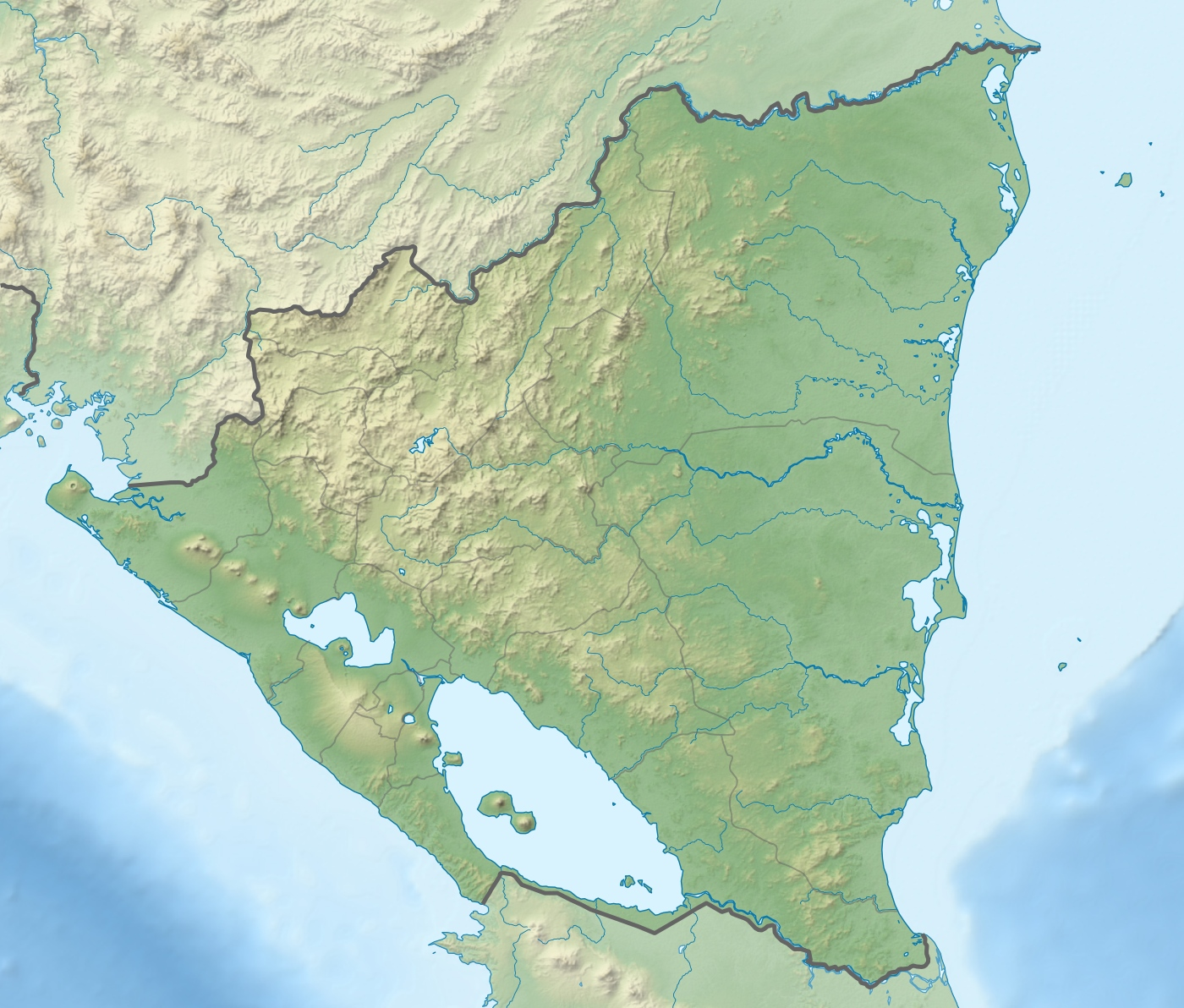
- Location within Nicaragua
- Location: Madriz Department, Nicaragua
- Nearest city: Somoto
- Coordinates: 13.35°N 86.60°W
- Area: 100.69 km^{2} (38.88 sq mi)
- Designation: Nature reserve
- Designated: 1991
- Governing body: Ministry of the Environment and Natural Resources (MARENA)

Tepesomoto–Pataste Nature Reserve (Spanish: Reserva Natural Tepesomoto Pataste) is a nature reserve in Nicaragua. It is one of the 78 reserves that are under official protection in the country.

The reserve is ten miles from Somoto in northern Nicaragua. It was created in 1991.

The reserve covers the mountain ridge running from Tepesomoto Volcano overlooking Somoto in the north, to the summit of Pataste near Las Sabanas in the south, that forms a natural barrier between the departments of Madriz and Estelí. It reaches heights of around 1700 metres at the two peaks of Tepesomoto and Pataste.
