= Battle of La Paz Centro =

- Part of United States occupation of Nicaragua, Banana Wars
- Battle of La Paz Centro (Nicaragua)
Date	16 May 1927
Location	La Paz Centro, Nicaragua
Result	American victory

Belligerents
United States	Nicaraguan Liberals

Commanders and leaders
(United States) Cap. Richard B. Buchanan †	unknown (possibly Francisco Sequeira "General Cabulla")

Strength
40 marines	75 guerrillas

Casualties and losses
2 killed (died from wounds); 2 wounded	14 killed unknown number captured ("a small group of prisoners" who were soon released.)

The Battle of La Paz Centro took place on May 16, 1927 during the American occupation of Nicaragua of 1926–1933. It took place after the end of Nicaraguan civil war of 1926–1927 and prior to the Sandino Rebellion of 1927–1933.

== The Battle ==
The incident began when American Marines heard gunshots coming from the town of La Paz Centro (located halfway between Managua and Chinandega) at nearly 1:00 in the morning and decided to investigate. The Marine platoon that entered the town was led by Captain Richard B. Buchanan. Three blocks into La Paz Centro, the Marines' left flank, led by Sergeant Glendell L. Fitzgerald came under fire from a crowd of about seventy-five armed Nicaraguans, forcing the former to take cover "under a protruding wooden sidewalk and behind a pile of railroad ties along the town’s main street." They were soon joined by Captain Buchanan's main force.

Buchanan was fatally wounded by fire coming from a local saloon while crossing Main Street. Sergeant Fitzgerald and two privates cleared out the enemy-occupied saloon, "killing seven of the enemy." The Americans' four casualties were brought into the recently cleared building, with Buchanan dying at 2:30. Private Marvin A. Jackson was also mortally wounded. "That was one boy that didn’t want to die. His brains were sticking out of that bullet hole, and he didn’t want to die" said Corporal Donald L. Truesdale. The hostile Nicaraguans began withdrawing at 3:00.

== Aftermath ==
Fourteen rebel corpses were found on the battlefield, some of which were wearing the red hatband of the rebel Liberal army. It is unknown for sure who commanded the Liberals that attacked the Marines at La Paz Centro, but Francisco Sequeira ("General Cabulla") seemed to be a likely suspect. After the firefight, two squads of Marines, led by Captain William P. Richards decided to visit Cabulla. On May 26, 1927, Captain Richards killed the Liberal general as the latter jumped out of his bed to go for a pistol. Cabulla's mistress, Concepción Alday, was also shot dead as she charged the Marines with a machete.

== American casualties ==
Fatally wounded:

- Captain Richard B. Buchanan
- Private Marvin A. Jackson

Non-fatally wounded:

- Corporal Anthony J. Rausch ("wounded in the right side of his chest and in the right arm")
- Private First Class William F. Simon, Jr. ("wounded in the right hand, the index finger being completely shot away")
