= La Máquina Natural Reserve =

Nature reserve in Nicaragua

- Interactive map of La Máquina Natural Reserve
- Type: Natural Reserves
- Location: Diriamba, Carazo
- Coordinates: 11.745615°N 86.32612°W
- Area: 158.2 ha
- Website: https://reservalamakina.com/

The La Máquina Natural Reserve is a nature reserve located in Nicaragua. It is one of the 78 reserves that are under official protection in the country.

A trail leads to a rock cliff showcasing the site’s geological history. On Sundays, cultural events feature performances of El Güegüense, a famous internationally recognized play highlighting indigenous resistance to Spanish colonization.

== Geography ==
La Máquina is a natural reserve located in the Carazo department of Nicaragua, about 60 kilometers from Managua. It is accessible by road from Diriamba, and buses heading to the beach towns of La Boquita and Casares can also drop visitors off at the reserve. A sign at kilometer point 58½ marks the entrance.

== Environment ==
The reserve includes a river, 13 ha of tropical dry forest, 15 ha of forest plantations, and 60 hectares of forest.

Visitors can explore trails through the forest, ancient trees, and wildlife like birds, lizards, snakes, small mammals, and other tropical creatures.
