= Sierra Amerrisque Nature Reserve =

Nature reserve in Nicaragua

- IUCN category IV (habitat/species management area)
- Interactive map of Sierra Amerrisque Nature Reserve
- Location: Chontales Department, Nicaragua
- Area: 191.95 km^{2} (74.11 sq mi)
- Designation: Nature reserve
- Designated: 1991
- Governing body: Ministry of the Environment and Natural Resources (MARENA)

Sierra Amerrisque Nature Reserve is a nature reserve in Nicaragua. It was protected on 4 November 1991, and covers 19,195 hectares. It is one of 78 Nicaraguan reserves under official protection.
