= Chacocente Wildlife Refuge =

Wildlife refuge in Nicaragua

Coordinates: 11.5575923°N 86.2056828°W

Chacocente Wildlife Refuge is a nature reserve in Nicaragua. It is one of the 78 reserves which are officially under protection in the country. It is a site for nesting sea turtles.
