= Llanos de Makantaka Natural Reserve =

Nature reserve in Nicaragua

Coordinates: 13.3974426°N 84.1501188°W

Llanos de Makantaka Natural Reserve is a nature reserve in Nicaragua. It is one of the 78 reserves that are under official protection in the country.

The reserve was created on November 4, 1991; it has an area of 2,511 hectares and is covers part of La Cruz de Río Grande and Desembocadura de Río Grande.
