= Islets of Granada =

Coordinates: 11.902°N 85.909°W

The islets of Granada (Spanish: Isletas de Granada) are located in Lake Nicaragua, just southeast of the city of Granada in Nicaragua. The islets are a group of 365 small islands scattered about the Asese peninsula. The islets are of volcanic origin, they were formed when the Mombacho volcano blew much of its cone into the lake thousands of years ago, thereby creating the archipelago. Most of the islets are covered with vegetation and rich with bird life.

Many of the islets are occupied. Some are privately owned and hold homes or vacation houses. There are facilities for the residents and for tourists. Hotels and shops are established on some of the islets, and boating tours are available.

== Fort on the islets ==
The fort of San Pablo is located on the islets in Lake Nicaragua. The fort of San Pablo was built in order to protect the city of Granada from Pirates in the 18th century. The San Pablo Fort on the Islets has witnessed the battles and conflicts endured during the Colonial Period.

== Somoza's dictatorship and subsequent history ==
Many residents of the islands were forced to relocate to the mainland in the 1990s after having lived there for several generations. During Somoza's dictatorship, members of his National Guard forced many locals to either sell their islands or risk being forcibly removed. After the Sandinista revolution, many of islands were returned to their previous owners. By 1990, when the Sandinistas lost power in a general election, land titles had yet to be provided to the residents. Working through the then anti-Sandinista court system, the islands were returned to family members of the original National Guard who had "confiscated" the islands. Some of these islands have been sold to wealthy Nicaraguans and foreigners, resulting in an uncertain future for the local Nicaraguans who have traditionally lived on the islands and nearby peninsula.
