= Cordillera de Yolaina Natural Reserve =

Nature reserve in Nicaragua

Cordillera de Yolaina Natural Reserve is a nature reserve in Nicaragua. It has an area of 40000 hectares, and was created in 1991.
