= Pahara Lagoon Natural Reserve =

Nature reserve in Nicaragua

Coordinates: 14.296°N 83.267°W

Pahara Lagoon Natural Reserve is a nature reserve in Nicaragua. It is one of the 78 reserves that are under official protection in the country.
