= Volcán San Cristóbal-Casita Natural Reserve =

Nature reserve in Nicaragua

Coordinates: 12.720°N 86.963°W

Volcán San Cristóbal-Casita Natural Reserve is a nature reserve in Nicaragua. It is one of the 78 reserves that are under official protection in the country.
