= Mecatepe Lagoon Natural Reserve =

Nature reserve in Nicaragua

Mecatepe Lagoon Natural Reserve is a nature reserve in Nicaragua. It is one of the 78 reserves that are under official protection in the country. It is located in southern Granada Department, east of hwy 1.
