= Nejapa Lagoon =

Lagoon and nature reserve in Nicaragua

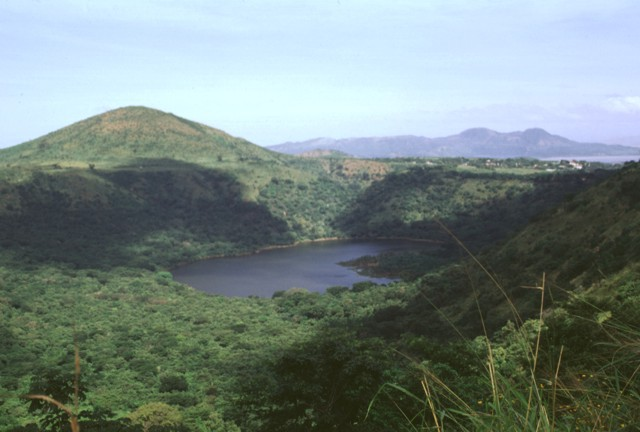

Nejapa Lagoon (Laguna de Nejapa) is a volcanic lake located west of Managua, the capital of Nicaragua, in the highest part of the city. It occupies an oval depression 160 meters deep, formed by three collapses at the foot of Motastepe Hill. Its geographic coordinates are 12° 10' 99" north latitude and 86° 31' 64" west longitude, at an altitude of 51.15 meters above sea level.

In 1991, it was declared a natural reserve, Reserva natural Laguna de Nejapa, by Decree No. 4291, published in La Gaceta, the Official Gazette, for the protection and restoration of the protected area.
