= Salto Río Yasika Natural Reserve =

Nature reserve in Nicaragua

Salto Río Yasika Natural Reserve is a nature reserve in Nicaragua. It has an area of 445 hectares, and was created in 1991.
