= Yulu Karata Natural Reserve =

Nature reserve in Nicaragua

Yulu Karata Natural Reserve is a nature reserve in Nicaragua, with 25,300 acres. It was officially protected in 1991.
