= National System of Protected Areas (Nicaragua) =

National System of Protected Areas (Spanish: Sistema Nacional de Áreas Protegidas) SINAP, is the Nicaraguan national parks administrator, and is part of the Nicaraguan Ministry of Environment and Natural Resources (MARENA).

SINAP is entrusted to the territorial delegation of MARENA for each department and is carried out thanks to the participation of the municipalities and non-governmental organizations, through a co-management model.

== Protected areas ==
Nicaragua has 78 protected areas which cover 18% of its landmass, SINAP categorizes each of them as:

- Nature Reserves
- Genetic Resources Reserves
- Nature Sanctuaries
- Private Nature Reserves
- National Monuments
- Historical Monuments

== See also ==
- Protected areas of Nicaragua
- Wildlife of Nicaragua
- Government of Nicaragua
