= Kligna Natural Reserve =

Nature reserve in Nicaragua

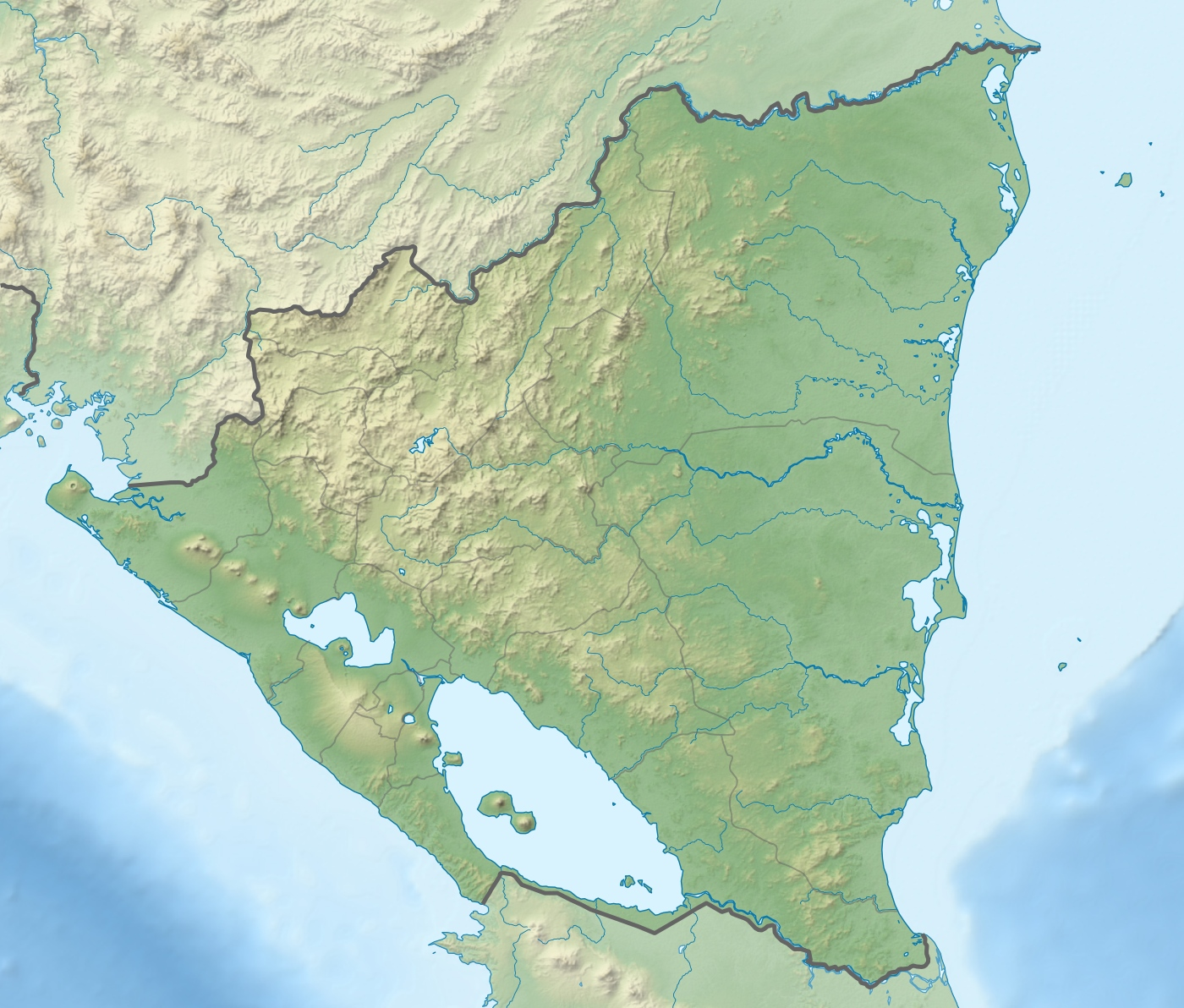
- Location within Nicaragua
- Location: Nicaragua
- Nearest city: Puerto Cabezas
- Coordinates: 13°57′07″N 83°39′08″W
- Area: 1,000 hectares (2,500 acres)

Kligna Natural Reserve is a nature reserve in Nicaragua. It is one of the 78 reserves that are under official protection in the country.
