= Yolaina Natural Reserve =

Nature reserve in Nicaragua

Coordinates: 11.6164161°N 84.366674°W

Yolaina Natural Reserve is a nature reserve in Nicaragua. It is one of the 78 reserves that are under official protection in the country.
