= Tisma Lagoon Natural Reserve =

Nature reserve in Nicaragua

Designations

Ramsar Wetland
- Official name: Sistema Lagunar de Tisma
- Designated: 8 November 2001
- Reference no.: 1141

Tisma Lagoon Natural Reserve is a nature reserve in Nicaragua. It is one of the 78 reserves that are under official protection in the country.
