= Volcán San Cristóbal Natural Reserve =

Nature reserve in Nicaragua

Coordinates: 12°42′25.48″N 87°0′7.47″W

Volcán San Cristóbal Natural Reserve is a nature reserve in Nicaragua. It is one of the 78 reserves that are under official protection in the country.
