= Volcán Maderas Natural Reserve =

Nature reserve in Nicaragua

Coordinates: 11.4452535°N 85.5078535°W

Volcán Maderas Natural Reserve is a nature reserve on the island of Ometepe in Nicaragua. The reserve contains Volcán Maderas, an extinct 1,394-meter volcano surrounded by a cloud forest. The crater contains a lagoon. Visitors who wish to climb the volcano are required to hire a guide.

The reserve also offers petroglyph tours, coffee and cacao tours, horseback riding, and visits to the San Ramón waterfall.
