= Fila Masigüe Natural Reserve =

Nature reserve in Nicaragua

Fila Masigüe Natural Reserve is a nature reserve in Nicaragua. It is one of the 78 reserves that are under official protection in the country. It is located in north-central Boaco Department at the western junction of hwy 31 and hwy 17.
