= Christian Yulu =

Angolan footballer

Personal information
- Full name: Christian Yulu Ngwandjo
- Date of birth: 2 February 1982 (age 44)
- Place of birth: Luanda, Angola
- Height: 1.77 m (5 ft 10 in)
- Positions: Winger; forward

Senior career*
Years	Team	Apps	(Gls)
- Rennes B
2003	Coventry City	3	(0)
- Châteaubriant
2009	Boston Aztec		
- Caála
- * Club domestic league appearances and goals

Christian Yulu Ngwandjo (born 2 February 1982) is an Angolan former footballer who is last known to have played as a winger or forward for Caála.

== Career ==
Before the second half of 2002/03, Yulu signed for Coventry City in the English second division after playing for the reserves of French Ligue 1 side Rennes.

In 2009, he signed for Boston Aztec in the American lower leagues after playing for French lower league club Châteaubriant, before joining Caála in Angola.
