= Alamikamaba Natural Reserve =

Nature reserve in Nicaragua

Alamikamba Natural Reserve
- Interactive map of Alamikamba Natural Reserve
- Location: Nicaragua
- Designation: Nature reserve
- Governing body: FUNDESO

Alamikamba Natural Reserve is a nature reserve in Nicaragua. It is one of the 78 reserves that are under official protection by FUNDESO in the country.
