= Llanos de Karawala Natural Reserve =

Nature reserve in Nicaragua

Coordinates: 12.982°N 83.656°W

Llanos de Karawala Natural Reserve is a nature reserve located in the South Caribbean Coast Autonomous Region of Nicaragua. It is one of the 78 reserves that are under official protection in the country. It became protected in 1991. It has an area of 4,293 hectares of pine savannah. It is near the town of Karawala.
