= Bosawás Biosphere Reserve =

Tropical rainforest in Nicaragua

- IUCN category IV (habitat/species management area)
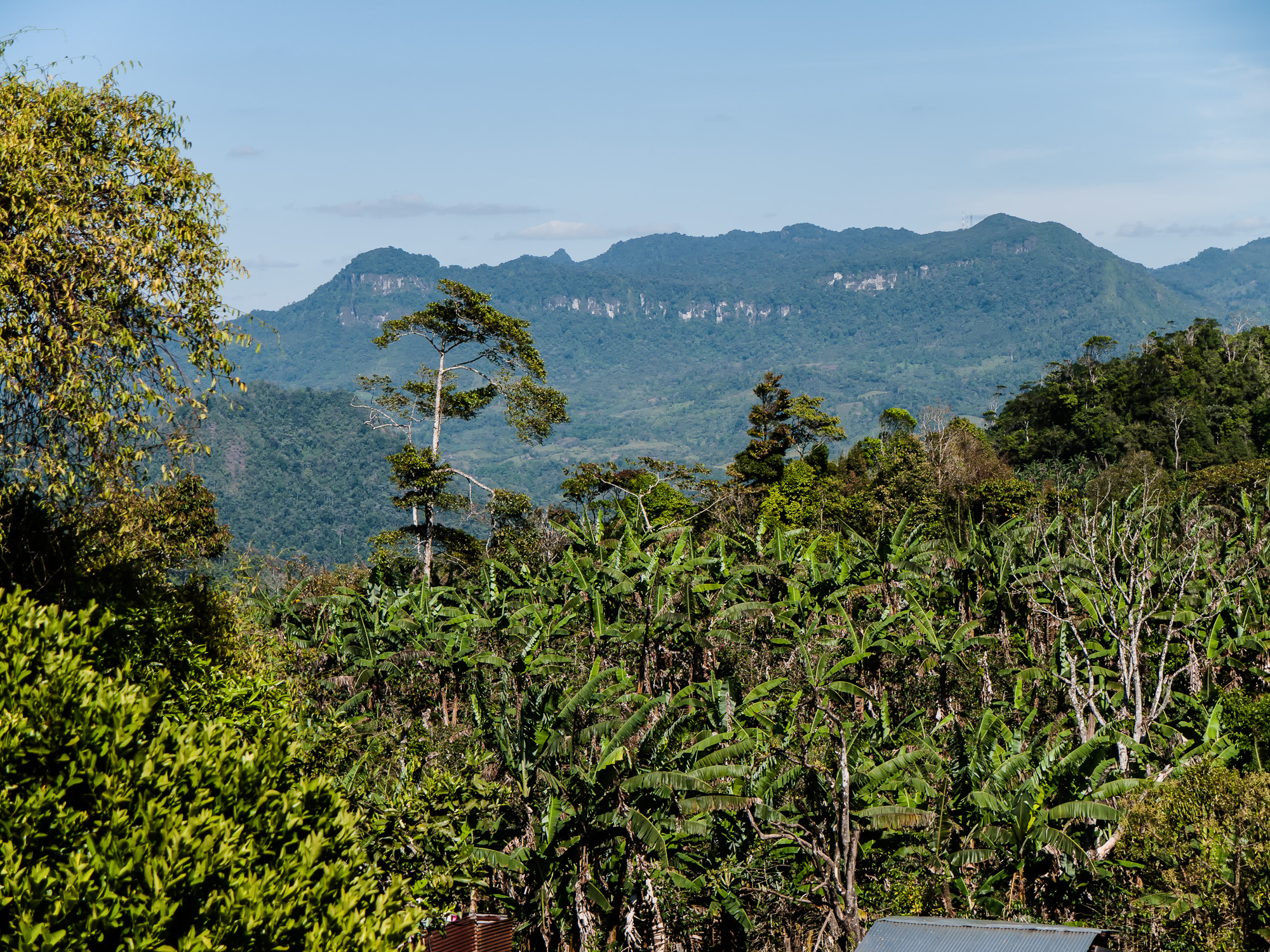
- Peñas Blancas, part of the Bosawás Biosphere Reserve

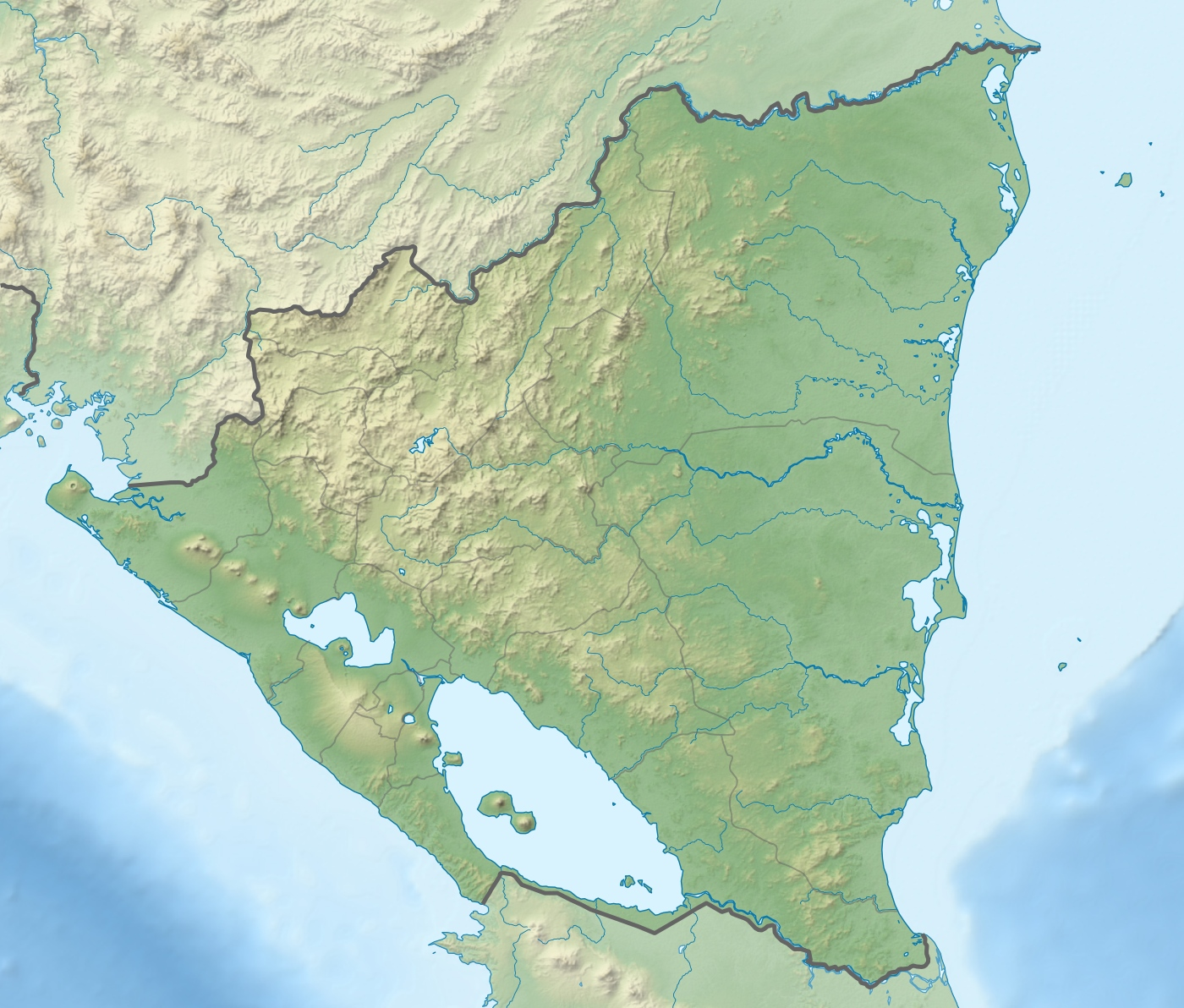
- Location within Nicaragua
- Location: Nicaragua
- Coordinates: 14°03′43″N 85°13′16″W
- Area: 20,000 km^{2} (7,700 mi^{2})

The Bosawás Biosphere Reserve is a tropical rainforest in Nicaragua designated as a UNESCO biosphere reserve in 1997. At approximately 20,000 km^{2} (2 million hectares) in size, the reserve (i.e. nucleus plus buffer zone) comprises about 15% of the nation's total land area. It is the second largest tropical rainforest in the Western Hemisphere, after the Amazon rainforest. Bosawás is largely unexplored, and is extremely rich in biodiversity.

== History ==
Located within the state of Jinotega in northern Nicaragua, Bosawás overlaps the homelands of two of Nicaragua's indigenous peoples, the Mayangna and the Miskito, in an area which has abundant natural resources, most notably timber and gold. About 130,000 inhabitants practice subsistence farming within the boundaries, about 35,000 of them indigenous Miskito and Mayangna people.

The Bosawás Biosphere Reserve developed over time out of conflicts between the Sandinista government and indigenous Miskitu and Mayangna. As part of the peace process coming out of armed conflict between the Sandanistas and the Mayangna and Miskitu, the Nicaraguan government signed the 1987 Autonomy Law of the Atlantic Coast of Nicaragua (Law 28) that formally recognized indigenous and Afro-descendant communities' territorial rights in the region. The subsequent Chamorro government set aside three large reserves, Bosawás being the largest, with its nucleus comprising approximately 7% of Nicaragua's total land area (the rest constitutes the reserve's buffer zone). The creation of Bosawás, declared without indigenous consultation, was initially considered a violation of the region's constitutionally guaranteed territorial autonomy. However, after negotiation and consultation with local Mayangna and Miskitu communities, by the late 1990s, indigenous territorial boundaries were demarcated, title was granted to the indigenous communities, and the idea of Bosawás as a biosphere reserve was embraced.

In January 2020, as part of an ongoing series of murders of indigenous people in Bosawás over land conflicts, several Mayangna people living in Bosawás were killed and kidnapped by mestizo settlers (colonos) seeking to steal indigenous land. This has repeated many times, including the August 2021 massacre of nine indigenous people and sexual assaults of indigenous women in Sauni As.

== Etymology ==
The name is derived from three natural features: The Bocay River, Mount Saslaya and the Waspuk River. It includes all of Nicaragua's Saslaya National Park. The Cordillera Isabella crosses the reserve area, and the Coco River forms the northern border with Honduras.

== Flora and fauna ==
Bosawás has an estimated 10,000 km^{2} of forest.

The botanical diversity of Bosawás is very high, with vascular plant species considered to be in the thousands. Bosawás also is rich in invertebrate and vertebrate taxa. Within Bosawás live an estimated 100,000 to 200,000 insect species; the number is believed to be higher, however a closer estimate is not possible due to the area being relatively unexplored. Quetzals and guacamayas are present in significant numbers, along with the largest and most powerful eagle found in the Americas, the harpy eagle (Harpia harpyja). These, however, are just a few of the 700 Nicaraguan bird species potentially found in the reserve, which has been designated an Important Bird Area (IBA) by BirdLife International. Pumas and jaguars, considered powerful top predators of the food chain, are present in the reserve, and tapirs (Tapirus bairdii) are their favorite prey.

The Saslaya moss salamander (Nototriton saslaya) is named after Mount Saslaya. Its entire range is within the Bosawás Biosphere Reserve.

== See also ==
- National System of Protected Areas (Nicaragua)
- Protected areas of Nicaragua
- Wildlife of Nicaragua
