= Cabo Viejo-Tala-Sulamas Natural Reserve =

Nature reserve in Nicaragua

Coordinates: 14.89473°N 83.46453°W

Cabo Viejo-Tala-Sulamas Natural Reserve is a nature reserve in Nicaragua. It was established in 1991, and is located in the North Caribbean Coast Autonomous Region.
