= Fauna of Nicaragua =

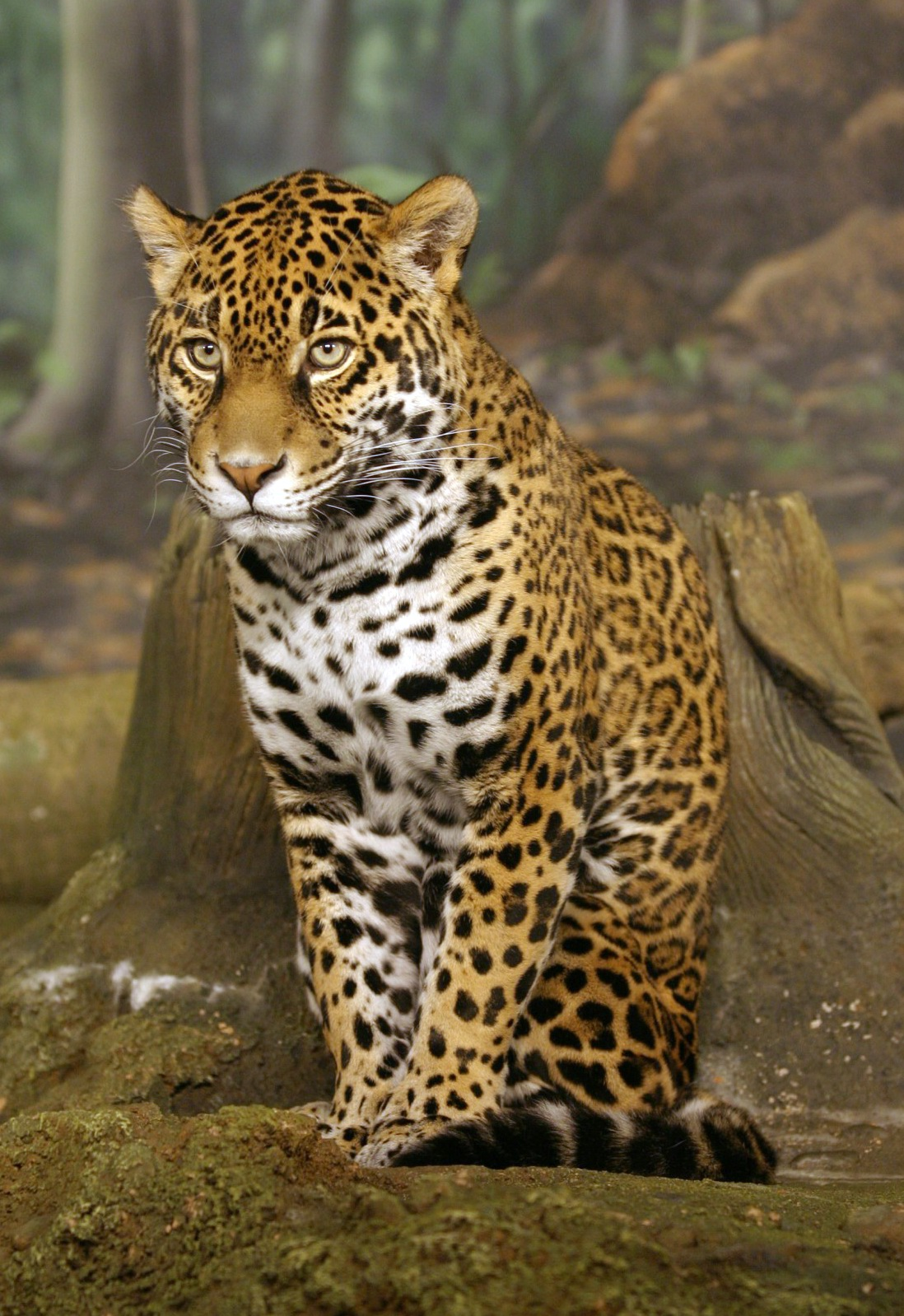
The jaguar is the largest felid in Nicaragua

The fauna of Nicaragua is characterized by a very high level of biodiversity. Much of Nicaragua's wildlife lives in protected areas. There are currently 78 protected areas in Nicaragua, covering more than 22,000 square kilometers (8,500 sq mi), or about 17% of its landmass.

These protected areas encompass a wide variety of habitats, including rainforests, lakes, mountains, and volcanoes throughout the country. For example, Bosawás Biosphere Reserve in state of Jinotega (border with Honduras), covers 7,300 square kilometers (2,800 sq mi), making it the second largest rainforest in the Americas after the Amazon rainforest in Brazil.

== Mammals ==
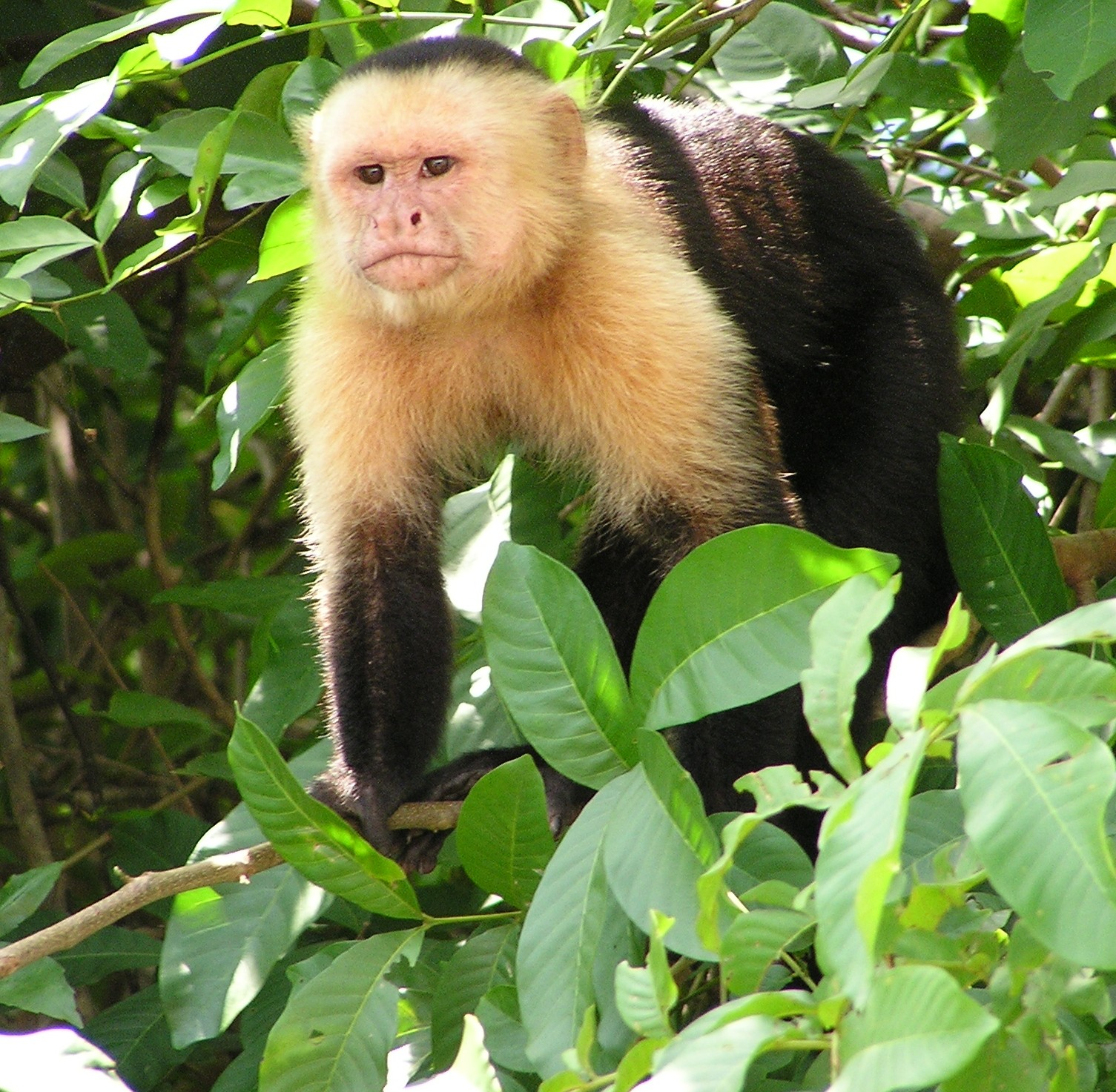
A white-headed capuchin monkey.

Nicaragua is home to several species of New World monkeys, including the Geoffroy's spider monkey, which is currently listed by the International Union for Conservation of Nature (IUCN) as an endangered species. The jaguar is the largest felid that is indigenous to Nicaragua. Other species include the cougar, jaguarundi, margay, and ocelot. There are a number of unusual mammals found in Nicaragua, including the three-toed sloth, northern tamandua (lesser anteater), and two species of armadillo.

== Birds ==
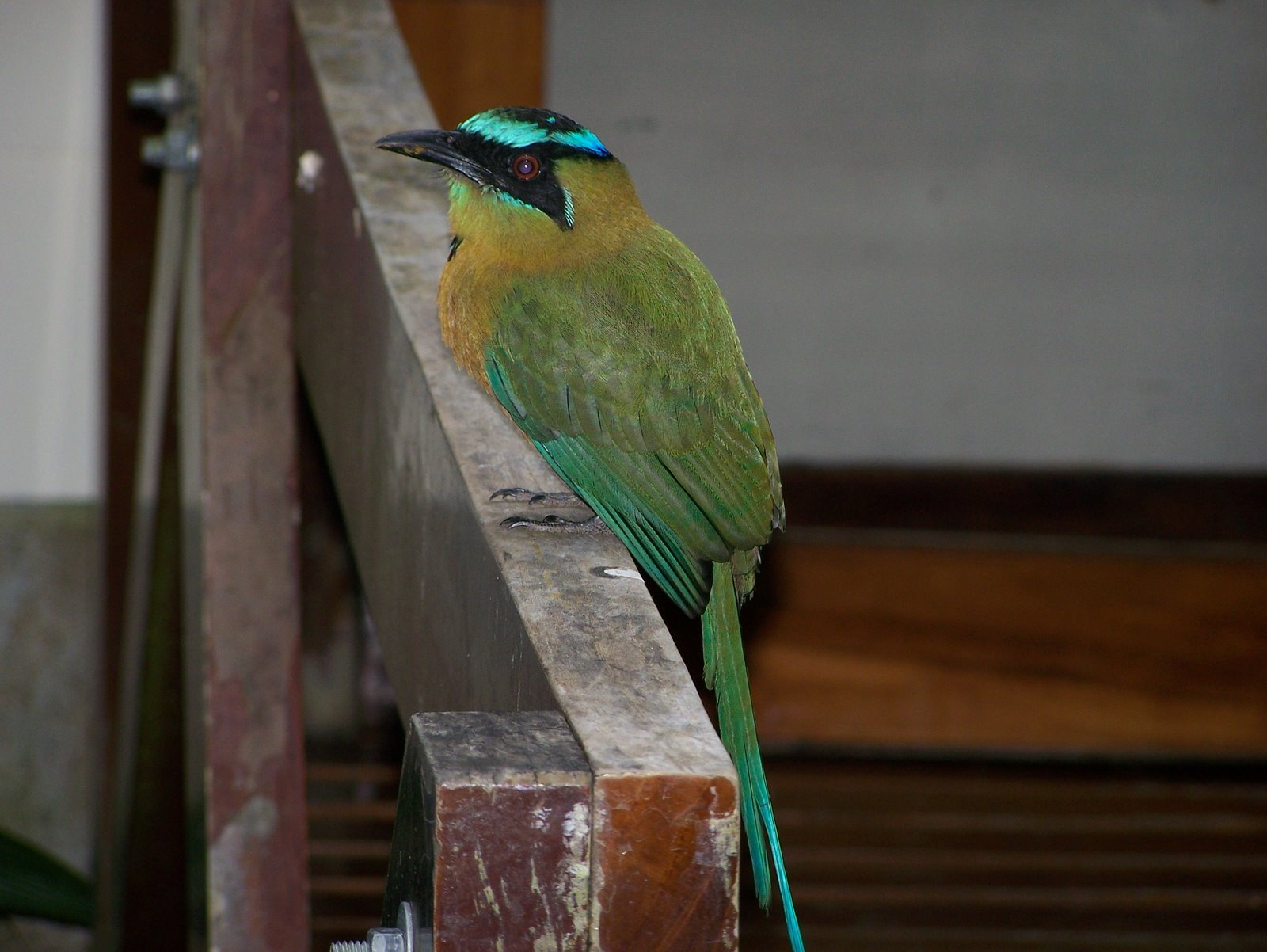
The barranquero or Lesson's motmot (Momotus lessonii) is the national bird of Nicaragua.

There are 698 identified bird species of Nicaragua. Eight of these species, including the golden-cheeked warbler (Dendroica chrysoparia) and the great green macaw (Ara ambigua), are currently listed by the IUCN as threatened.

Many of Nicaragua's birds are brilliantly colored, including species of parrots, toucans, trogons, and hummingbirds. Lesson's motmot is the national bird of Nicaragua. Natural range for the scarlet macaw has been vastly reduced by the pet trade. Most of the Pacific region of Nicaragua no longer is inhabited by the species.

== Reptiles ==
Nicaragua is home to many nesting populations of sea turtles, including the hawksbill sea turtle, leatherback sea turtle, loggerhead sea turtle, olive ridley sea turtle, and the Pacific green turtle (Chelonia mydas agassisi). All of these are endangered or critically endangered species, with declining global populations. Extensive efforts are currently underway to preserve them as much as possible. The country also harbors a large diversity of terrestrial snake and lizard species, and is home to the spectacled caiman and American crocodile.

== Fish ==
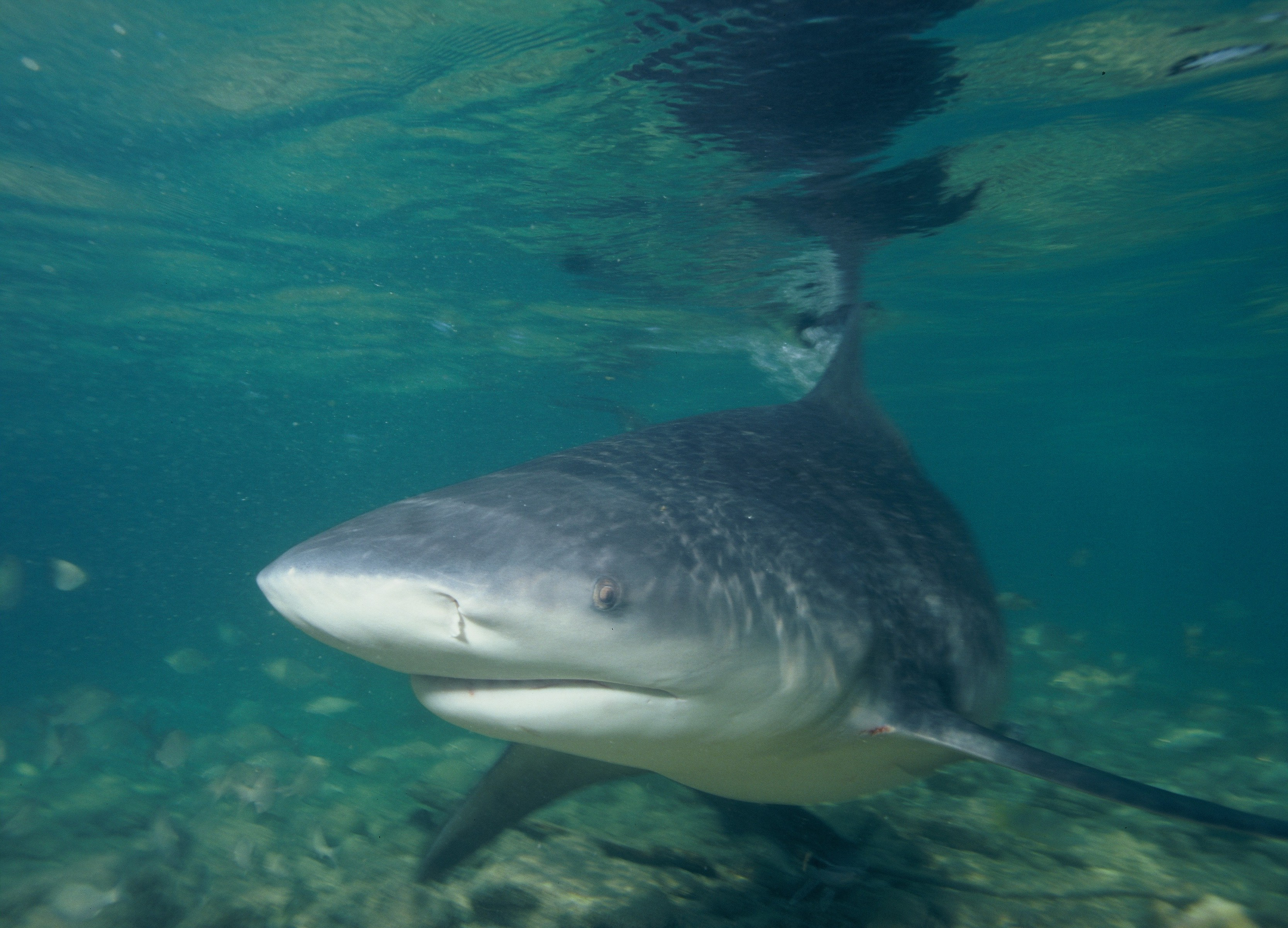
A bull shark, which can survive in fresh water.

The bull shark is a species of shark that can survive for an extended period of time in fresh water. It can be found in Lake Nicaragua and the San Juan River, where it is often referred to as the "Nicaragua shark". Nicaragua has recently banned freshwater fishing of the Nicaragua shark and the sawfish in response to the declining populations of these animals.

The Midas cichlid, native to the San Juan River basin in Nicaragua and Costar Rica, is now recognized as a species complex with dozens of species, most or all of them inhabiting extremely reduced ranges. Five species from a Lake Apoyo, a volcanic crater lake, have been described recently.

== Invertebrates ==
=== Molluscs ===
Many species of molluscs are indigenous to Nicaragua, including at least 79 species of terrestrial snails and slugs.

== Protected areas ==
There are currently 78 protected areas in Nicaragua, covering more than 22,000 square kilometers (8,500 sq mi), or about 17% of its landmass. These include wildlife refuges and nature reserves that shelter a wide range of ecosystems. There are more than 1,400 animal species classified thus far in Nicaragua. Some 12,000 species of plants have been classified thus far in Nicaragua, with an estimated 5,000 species not yet classified.

== See also ==
- List of amphibians of Nicaragua
- Flora of Nicaragua
- Ministry of the Environment and Natural Resources (MARENA)

General:

- Category:IUCN Red List critically endangered species
- IUCN Red List Critically Endangered species (Animalia)
