= Ministry of the Environment and Natural Resources (Nicaragua) =

The Ministry of the Environment and Natural Resources (MARENA), is in charge of environmental protection and of the study, planning, and management of the Nicaragua's natural resources. It was formerly known as the Nicaraguan Institute of Natural Resources and the Environment (IRENA). The ministry was created in 1979 by the Government of Nicaragua .

== Origins ==
In 1976, a group of Nicaraguan environmentalists proposed that the government create a Ministry of Natural Resources. The president at the time, Anastasio Somoza Debayle, rejected the idea and threatened the group with harsh reprisals if they met again. Some took to the forests and mountains to join the Sandinista guerrillas who were fomenting revolution against the Somoza government. Less than a week after the Somoza regime was overthrown and Sandinista government became known as MARENA. By the mid-1980s, MARENA received aid and advice from Sweden, Norway, Denmark, the Soviet Union, France, the Netherlands, Cuba, Mexico, the Organization of American States, the United Nations Environment Programme, and individual United States citizens.

== Overview ==
MARENA initiates and manages programs in reforestation, watershed management, pollution control, wildlife conservation, national parks, and the conservation of genetic diversity.

In 1981, MARENA found that half of water sources they sampled were seriously polluted by sewage and that 70,000 pounds of raw sewage was released into Lake Managua each day. Scores of industrial plants located on the lake's shore had freely dumped there for over a decade. The worst polluter was Pennwalt Corporation. MARENA could not afford, however, to build a sewage treatment plant because of the financial costs involved. Recently a treatment plant has been completed and the sewer network is being constructed.

In 1982, MARENA established seasonal hunting bans for 26 endangered species of mammals and 4 species of reptiles. This was in response to Nicaragua being a world leader in the export of rare and endangered species such as White-lipped peccaries, White-tailed deer, hawksbill turtles, freshwater otters, jaguars, ocelots, and margays. Educational campaigns were initiated by MARENA, along with marketplace and roadside inspections. By 1985, however, many of these bans were lifted because of the growing economic crisis in the country.

In 1983, MARENA targeted nearly one-fifth of Nicaragua's territory for national parks. This project was never realized, however, because the Contras had militarized much of the wilderness.

To address deforestation, MARENA directed major tree planting projects. Two million trees were grown annually in nurseries until 1986, when civil war and economic difficulties slowed the program. The reforestation projects became targets for the Contras, who sabotaged projects, and kidnapped and murdered over 50 MARENA employees.

== See also ==
- Protected areas of Nicaragua
- Wildlife of Nicaragua
- National System of Protected Areas (Nicaragua)
