= Central American pine–oak forests =

Ecoregion in Mexico and Central America

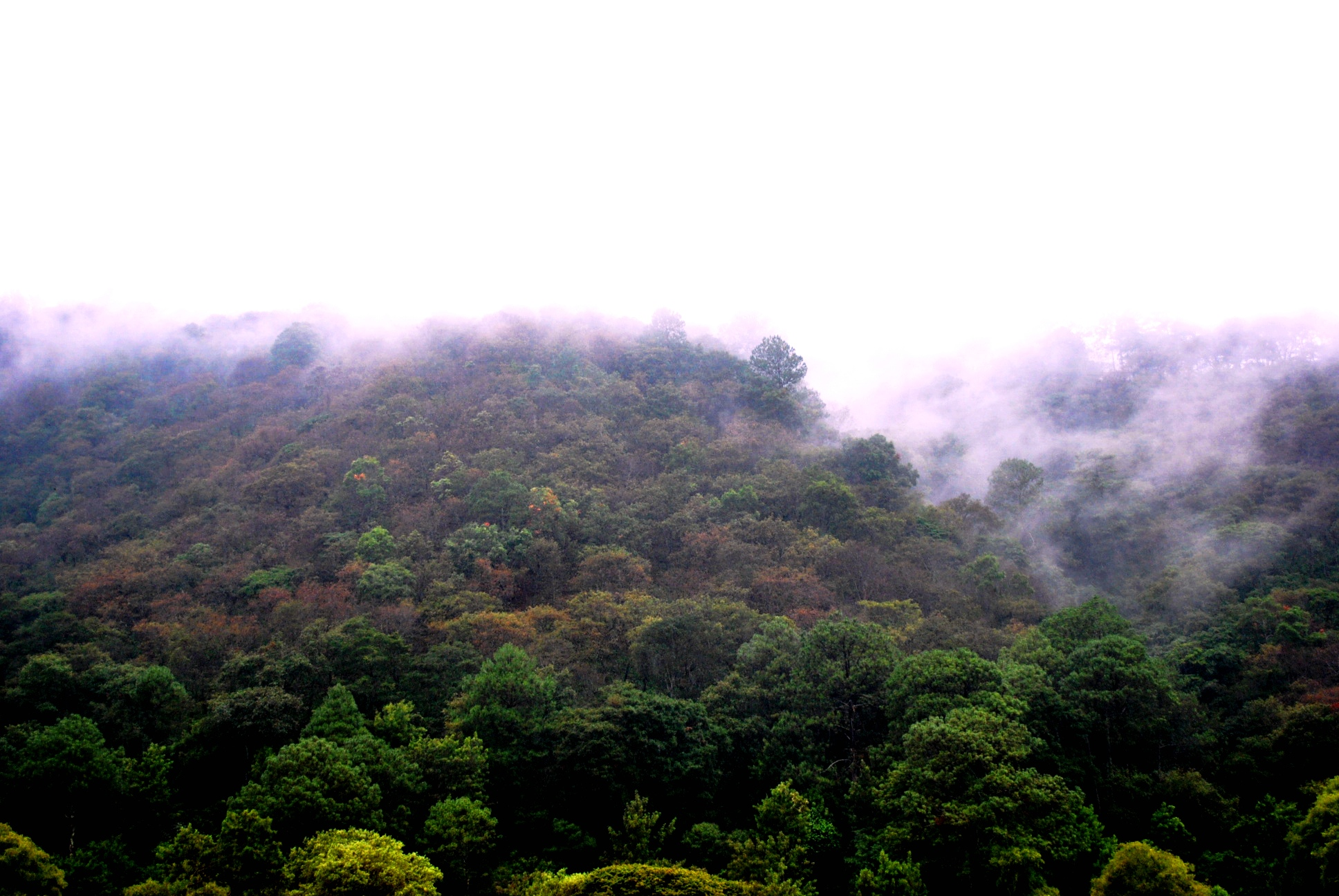
- Pine-oak forest in Chimaltenango, Guatemala

Ecology
- Realm: Neotropical
- Biome: Tropical and subtropical coniferous forests
- Borders: List: Central American Atlantic moist forests; Central American dry forests; Central American montane forests; Chiapas Depression dry forests; Chiapas montane forests; Isthmian–Atlantic moist forests; Motagua Valley thornscrub; Petén–Veracruz moist forests; Sierra Madre de Chiapas moist forests; Southern Pacific dry forests

Geography
- Area: 111,400 km^{2} (43,000 sq mi)
- Countries: List: Mexico (Chiapas); Guatemala; El Salvador; Honduras; Nicaragua

Conservation
- Conservation status: Critical/Endangered
- Global 200: Yes
- Protected: 11.67%

The Central American pine–oak forests is a tropical and subtropical coniferous forests ecoregion in the mountains of northern Central America and Chiapas state in southern Mexico.

== Setting ==
The Central American pine–oak forests occupy an area of 111,400 square kilometres (43,000 sq mi), extending along the mountainous spine of Central America, extending from the Sierra Madre de Chiapas and Chiapas Highlands in Mexico's Chiapas state through the highlands of Guatemala, El Salvador, and Honduras to central Nicaragua.

The pine-oak forests lie between 600–1,800 metres (2,000–5,900 ft) elevation. At lower elevations they transition to tropical moist forests on the Caribbean slope, and to tropical dry forests on the Pacific slope and interior valleys. Elevations above 1,800 metres (5,900 ft) are often covered with cloud forest ecoregions, including the Sierra Madre de Chiapas moist forests in the Sierra Madre de Chiapas, the Chiapas montane forests along the northern slope of the Chiapas Highlands, and the Central American montane forests in high-elevation enclaves from southern Guatemala to northern Nicaragua.

== Flora ==
The Central American pine–oak forests are composed mostly of pines (Pinus spp.) and oaks (Quercus spp.), with pines more abundant at higher elevations and oaks at lower elevations. Typical pines include Pinus chiapensis, Pinus tecunumanii, Pinus ayacahuite, and Pinus maximinoi. Typical oaks include Quercus corrugata, Quercus skinneri, Quercus oleoides, Quercus calophylla, Quercus acatenangensis, Quercus brachystachys, Quercus peduncularis, Quercus polymorpha, and Quercus acutifolia (syn. Quercus conspersa). American sweetgum (Liquidambar styraciflua) is often found among the oaks and pines.

The Central American pine–oak forests are the southernmost extent of species from genera typical of temperate North America, including pine, fir (Abies guatemalensis), cypress (Cupressus lusitanica), ash (Fraxinus hondurensis and Fraxinus uhdei), and yew (Taxus globosa).

== Fauna ==
Native mammals include jaguar (Panthera onca), puma (Puma concolor), ocelot (Leopardus pardalis), Baird's tapir (Tapirus bairdii), cacomistle (Bassariscus sumichrasti), greater grison (Galictis vittata), tayra (Eira barbara), Central American spider monkey (Ateles geoffroyi), mantled howler monkey (Alouatta palliata), and Mexican mouse opossum (Marmosa mexicana). They also include the bats Balantiopteryx io, Molossus aztecus, Macrotus waterhousii, Glossophaga leachii, Hylonycteris underwoodi, Carollia subrufa, Dermanura azteca, Dermanura tolteca, and Bauerus dubiaquercus. Native rodents include Liomys pictus, Microtus guatemalensis, Ototylomys phyllotis, Peromyscus aztecus, Reithrodontomys sumichrasti, and Scotinomys teguina.

The mountains are designated an Endemic Bird Area, and are home to several limited-range and threatened species. Resident birds include the bearded screech owl (Megascops barbarus), fulvous owl (Strix fulvescens), ocellated quail (Cyrtonyx ocellatus), belted flycatcher (Xenotriccus callizonus), pink-headed warbler (Cardellina versicolor), black-capped siskin (Spinus atriceps), green-throated mountaingem (Lampornis sybillae), wine-throated hummingbird (Selasphorus ellioti), blue-throated motmot (Aspatha gularis), black-capped swallow (Atticora pileata), rufous-browed wren (Troglodytes rufociliatus), blue-and-white mockingbird (Melanotis hypoleucus), rufous-collared thrush (Turdus rufitorques), bar-winged oriole (Icterus maculialatus), and bushy-crested jay (Cyanocorax melanocyaneus).

The pine–oak forests provide a winter home for several migratory species from temperate North America, including the golden-cheeked warbler (Dendroica chrysoparia) and azure-rumped tanager (Tangara cabanisi).

== Protected areas ==
11.67% of the ecoregion is in protected areas. Protected areas include:

El Salvador

- El Boquerón National Park (Crater del Volcán de San Salvador National Park)
- Los Volcanes National Park
- Montecristo National Park
- San Isidro Natural Monument

Guatemala

- Cerro del Baúl National Park
- El Pital Biological Reserve
- Ixil Visis-Cabá Biosphere Reserve
- Iximché Cultural Monument
- Laguna Lachuá National Park
- Laguna del Pino National Park
- Cuenca del Lago Atitlán Multiple Use Area
- Volcán y Laguna de Ipala Multiple Use Area
- Los Aposentos National Park
- Mario Dary Rivera Protected Biotope
- Naciones Unidas National Park
- Riscos de Momostenango National Park
- Trifinio Biosphere Reserve
- Volcán de Pacaya and Laguna de Calderas National Park
- Volcán Tacaná Biosphere Reserve

Honduras

- Agalta National Park
- Boquerón Natural Monument
- Celaque National Park
- Cerro Azul Meámbar National Park
- Cerro de Uyuca Biological Reserve
- Copán Ruins Cultural Monument
- Congolón, Piedra Parada and Coyocutena National Park
- Corralitos Wildlife Refuge
- El Chile Biological Reserve
- Erapuca Wildlife Refuge
- Guajiquiro Biological Reserve
- Güisayote Biological Reserve
- La Muralla Wildlife Refuge
- La Tigra National Park
- Misoco Biological Reserve
- Mixcure Wildlife Refuge
- Montaña de Botaderos Carlos Escaleras Mejía National Park
- Montaña de Comayagua National Park
- Montaña Verde Wildlife Refuge
- Montecillos Biological Reserve
- Montecristo Trifinio National Park
- Opalaca Biological Reserve
- Patuca National Park
- Pech Montaña El Carbón Anthropological and Forest Reserve
- Puca Wildlife Refuge
- Río Plátano Biosphere Reserve
- Sabanetas Biological Reserve
- Tawahka Asagni Biosphere Reserve
- Volcán Pacayita Biological Reserve
- Yerba Buena Biological Reserve
- Yuscarán (Monserrat) Biological Reserve

Mexico

- El Triunfo Biosphere Reserve
- Gertrude Duby Biotic Reserve
- Humedales de Montaña La Kisst
- Humedales de Montaña María Eugenia
- La Sepultura Biosphere Reserve
- Lagunas de Montebello National Park
- Sumidero Canyon National Park
- Zona de Protección Forestal en los terrenos que se encuentran en los municipios de La Concordia, Angel Albino Corzo, Villa Flores y Jiquipilas

Nicaragua

- Cerro Apante Nature Reserve
- Cerro Cumaica–Cerro Alegre Nature Reserve
- Cerro Datanlí–El Diablo Nature Reserve
- Cerro El Arenal Nature Reserve
- Cerro Guabule Nature Reserve
- Cerro Quiabuc–Las Brisas Nature Reserve
- Cerro Tisey–Estanzuela Nature Reserve
- Cerro Tomabú Nature Reserve
- Cerros de Yalí Nature Reserve
- Fila Cerro Frío–La Cumplida Nature Reserve
- Serranías de Dipilto–Jalapa Nature Reserve
- Sierra Amerrisque Nature Reserve
- Somoto Canyon National Monument
- Tepesomoto–Pataste Nature Reserve
- Yucul Genetic Resources Reserve

Internationally designated protected areas include Río Plátano Biosphere Reserve, a World Heritage Site, and the Ramsar Sites Humedales de Montaña La Kisst, Lago de Apanás - Asturias, Lagunas de Montebello National Park, Sumidero Canyon National Park, Embalse Cerrón Grande, Eco-región Lachuá, Complejo Güija, Humedales de Montaña María Eugenia, and Sistema de Humedales de la Zona Sur de Honduras.

== See also ==
- List of ecoregions in Mexico
- List of ecoregions in Guatemala
- List of ecoregions in El Salvador
- Ecoregions of Central America
- Trees of Central America
