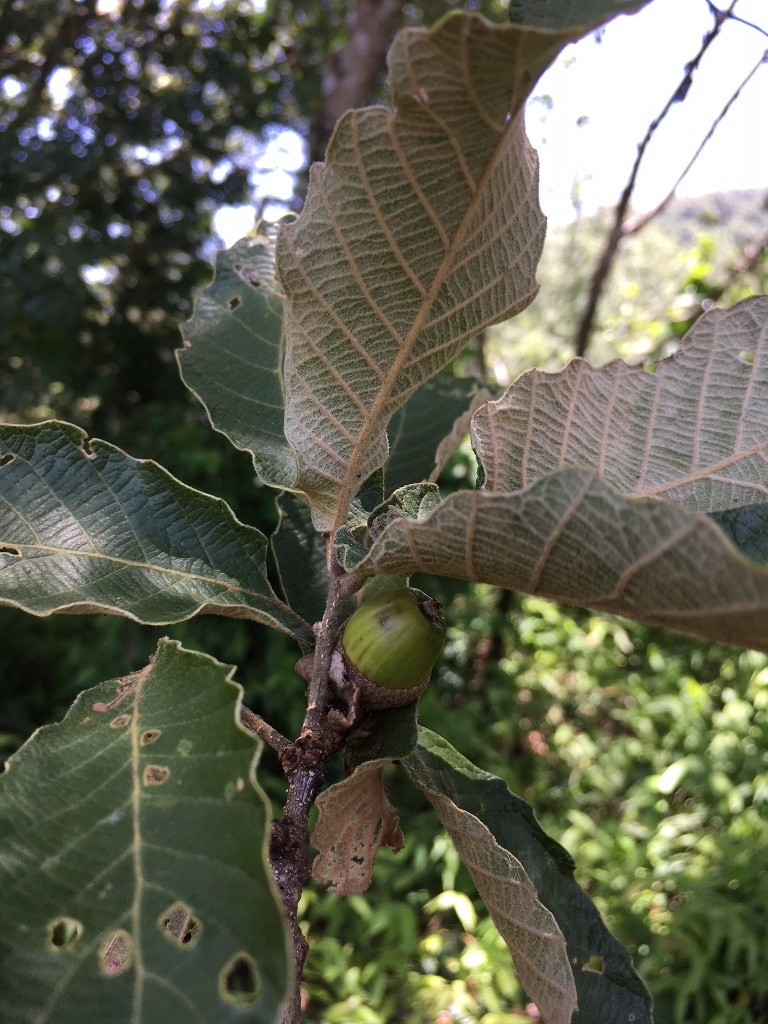

Conservation status
- Least Concern (IUCN 3.1)

Scientific classification
- Kingdom: Plantae
- Clade: Embryophytes
- Clade: Tracheophytes
- Clade: Spermatophytes
- Clade: Angiosperms
- Clade: Eudicots
- Clade: Rosids
- Order: Fagales
- Family: Fagaceae
- Genus: Quercus
- Subgenus: Quercus subg. Quercus
- Section: Quercus sect. Quercus
- Species: Q. segoviensis

Binomial name
- Quercus segoviensis Liebm.

Synonyms
- Quercus achoteana var. sublanosa Trel. ex Yunck.; Quercus matagalpana Trel.; Quercus peduncularis var. sublanosa (Trel. ex Yunck.) C.H.Mull.; Quercus reticulata var. segoviensis (Liebm.) Wenz.

= Quercus segoviensis =

Species of plant

Quercus segoviensis is a species of oak native to southern Mexico and northern Central America. It is a tree commonly known as k’antulán.

== Description ==
Quercus segoviensis is a small or medium-sized tree which grows up to 22 meters tall, with a trunk up to 40 cm in diameter.

== Range and habitat ==
Quercus segoviensis is native to the mountains of southern Mexico and northern Central America. Its range includes the Sierra Madre de Oaxaca and eastern Sierra Madre del Sur of Mexico's Oaxaca state, the Chiapas Highlands of central Chiapas, the Sierra Madre de Chiapas of Chiapas and Guatemala, the Guatemalan Highlands, and the Chortis Highlands of El Salvador, Honduras, and Nicaragua, including Honduras' Montaña de Comayagua National Park.

It is often found as a canopy tree in montane oak and pine–oak forests and cloud forests between 750 and 2,500 meters elevation.

It is widely distributed in its native highlands. Much of its habitat has been disturbed by clearance for agriculture and livestock grazing and frequent human-set fires, but the species shows robust regeneration in cleared areas and along forest edges. Its conservation status is assessed as least concern.

== Uses ==
The tree produces a hard timber which is used for poles, fences, houses, tool handles, and for firewood.
