= Chiapas montane forests =

Tropical moist broafleaf forest ecoregion of Chiapas, Mexico

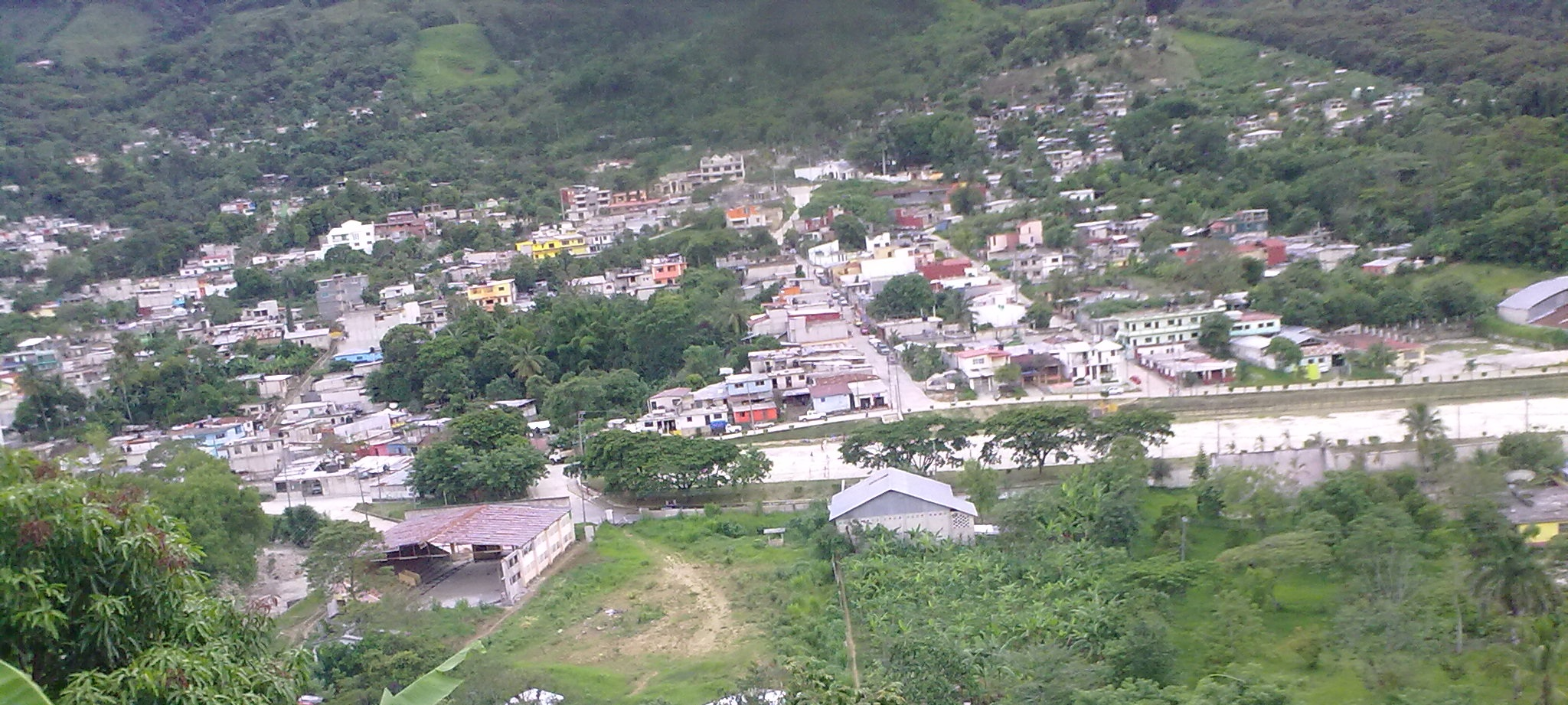
- Yajalón, in Chiapas, Mexico

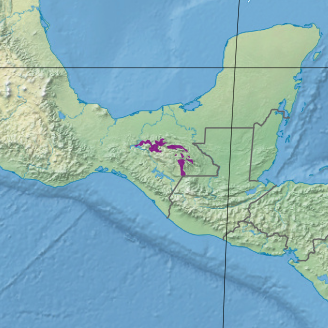
- Ecoregion territory (in purple)

Ecology
- Realm: Neotropical
- Biome: tropical and subtropical moist broadleaf forests
- Borders: List: Central American pine–oak forests; Chiapas Depression dry forests; Petén–Veracruz moist forests; Sierra Madre de Oaxaca pine–oak forests; Southern Pacific dry forests

Geography
- Area: 5,759 km^{2} (2,224 sq mi)
- Countries: Mexico; Guatemala
- States: Chiapas

Conservation
- Conservation status: Critical/endangered
- Protected: 273 km² (5%)

The Chiapas montane forests is a tropical moist broadleaf forest ecoregion in southern Mexico and extending into western Guatemala. It includes the montane tropical forests on the northern and northeastern slopes of the Chiapas Highlands.

== Geography ==
The Chiapas montane forests lie on the northern and northeastern slopes of the Chiapas highlands, between the lowland Petén–Veracruz moist forests to the north and east and the Central American pine–oak forests in the higher mountains to the south.

== Climate ==
The climate of the ecoregion is tropical and humid. The forests have a cooler climate than the adjacent lowlands, and average annual temperatures decrease with elevation.

== Flora ==
The predominant plant community is mountain cloud forest. Characteristic tree species include majagua (Trichospermum mexicanum), American sweetgum (Liquidambar styraciflua) and alder (Alnus sp). There are approximately 98,050 hectares of primary forest, and 272,991 hectares of second-growth forest.

== Fauna ==
Native animals include coyote (Canis latrans) and white-tailed deer (Odocoileus virginianus), mountain trogon (Trogon mexicanus), Steller's jay (Cyanocitta stelleri), Stuart's burrowing snake (Adelphicos veraepacis), and Godman's pit viper (Bothrops godmani).

== Protected areas ==
A 2017 assessment found 273 km², or 5%, of the ecoregion is in protected areas. Protected areas include Nahá Flora and Fauna Protection Area, Montes Azules Biosphere Reserve, and Lagunas de Montebello National Park.

== See also ==
- List of ecoregions in Mexico
