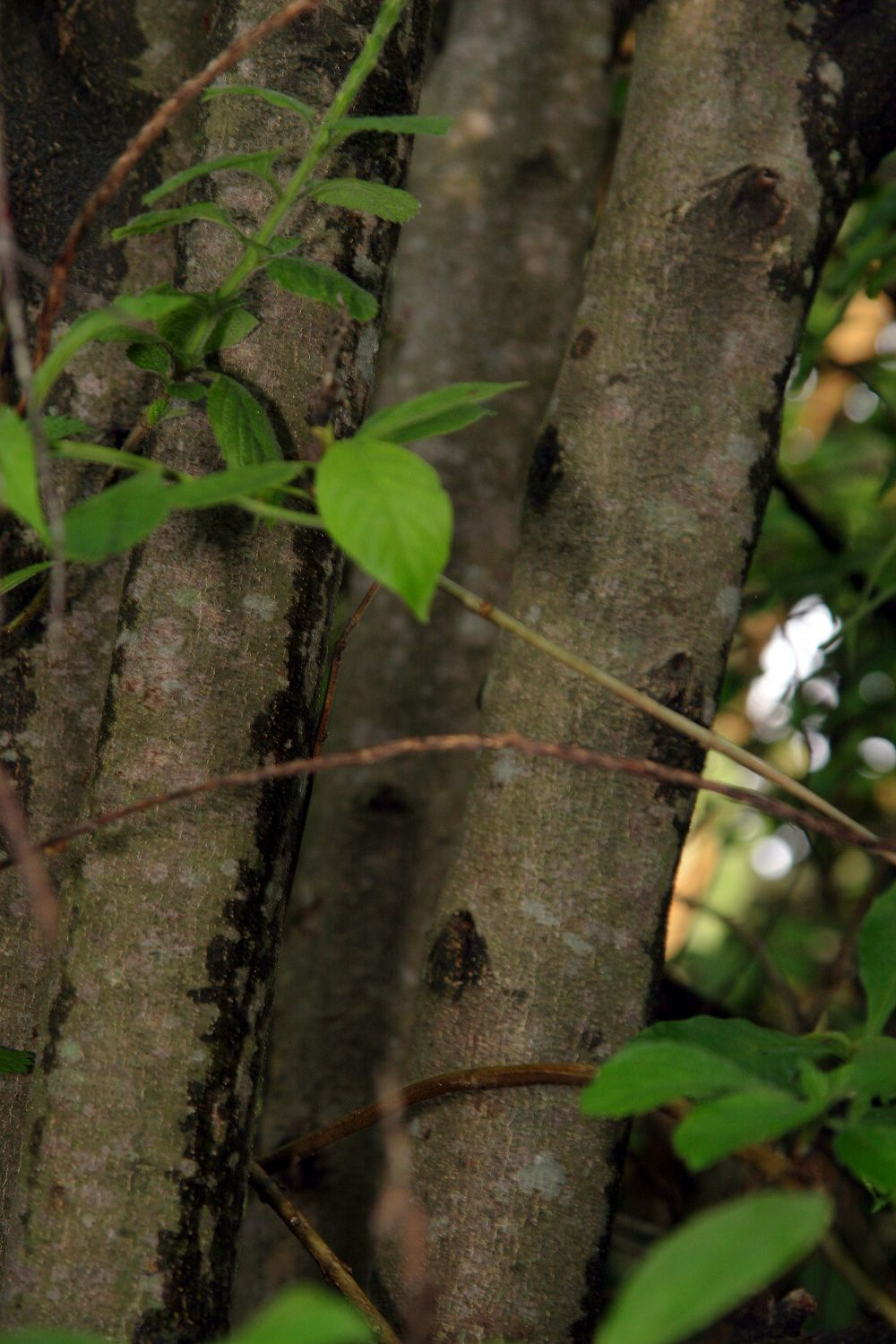

Conservation status
- Least Concern (IUCN 3.1)

Scientific classification
- Kingdom: Plantae
- Clade: Tracheophytes
- Clade: Angiosperms
- Clade: Eudicots
- Clade: Asterids
- Order: Cornales
- Family: Cornaceae
- Genus: Cornus
- Species: C. disciflora

Binomial name
- Cornus disciflora Moc. & Sessé ex DC.

Synonyms
- Benthamia disciflora (Moc. & Sessé ex DC.) K.Koch; Benthamidia disciflora (Moc. & Sessé ex DC.) H.Hara; Benthamia grandis (Cham. & Schltdl.) Nakai; Benthamidia disciflora var. floccosa (Wangerin) H.Hara; Cornus capitata Sessé & Moc.; Cornus disciflora var. floccosa (Wangerin) Standl.; Cornus disciflora f. floccosa (Wangerin) Rickett; Cornus floccosa Wangerin; Cornus grandis Schltdl. & Cham.; Cynoxylon disciflorum (Moc. & Sessé ex DC.) Hutch.; Cynoxylon floccosum (Wangerin) Hutch.; Cynoxylon grande (Cham. & Schltdl.) Pojark.; Discocrania disciflora (Moc. & Sessé ex DC.) Trifonova & I.G.Zubkova; Discocrania floccosa (Wangerin) M.Král

= Cornus disciflora =

Species of plant

Cornus disciflora is a species of flowering plant native to Mexico and Central America.

== Description ==
Cornus disciflora is a small to a large tree, growing from 6 to 25 meters tall. It flowers from January to July and September to December, and fruits in March and April and from June to November.

== Range and habitat ==
Cornus disciflora is distributed throughout the mountains of Mexico and Central America, where it is found in the Sierra Madre Occidental, Sierra Madre Oriental, Trans-Mexican Volcanic Belt, Sierra Madre del Sur, and Chiapas Highlands of Mexico, the Sierra Madre de Chiapas of Mexico and Guatemala, the Chortis Highlands of El Salvador, Honduras, and northern Nicaragua, and the Cordillera de Talamanca of Costa Rica and western Panama.

It is generally found in humid forests, including montane and premontane cloud forests and oak forests, and in wet areas of subhumid montane forests, between 1,000 and 2,900 meters elevation.

The fruits are an important food source for birds.
