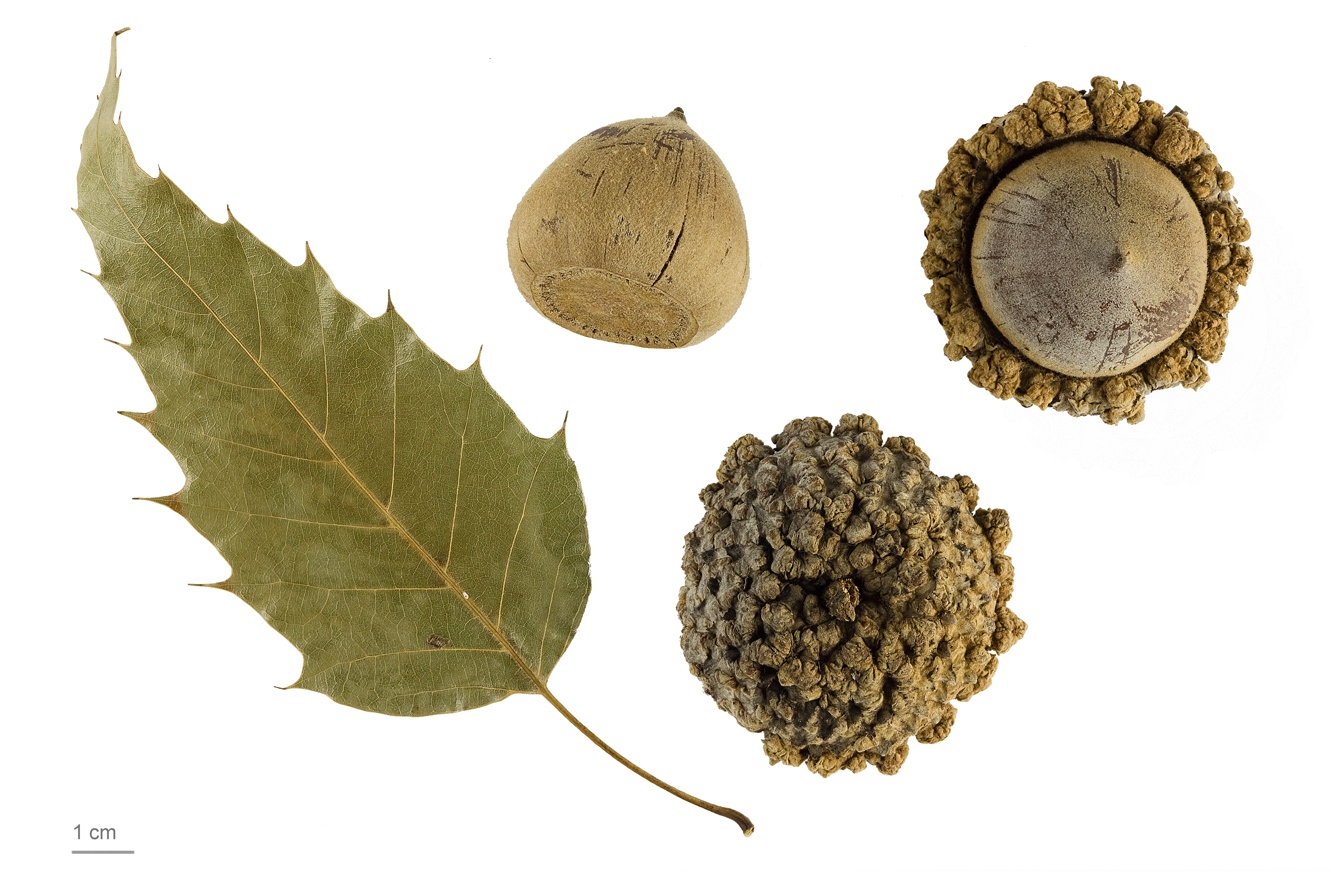
- Quercus skinneri - MHNT

Conservation status
- Near Threatened (IUCN 3.1)

Scientific classification
- Kingdom: Plantae
- Clade: Embryophytes
- Clade: Tracheophytes
- Clade: Spermatophytes
- Clade: Angiosperms
- Clade: Eudicots
- Clade: Rosids
- Order: Fagales
- Family: Fagaceae
- Genus: Quercus
- Subgenus: Quercus subg. Quercus
- Section: Quercus sect. Lobatae
- Species: Q. skinneri

Binomial name
- Quercus skinneri Benth.

= Quercus skinneri =

Species of flowering plant

Quercus skinneri is a species of oak. It is found in Mexico, Guatemala, Honduras, and El Salvador. It is threatened by habitat loss.

== Description ==
Quercus skinneri is a medium-sized to large tree, growing up to 25 meters tall.

== Range and habitat ==
Quercus skinneri is found in the mountains and foothills of southern Mexico, including the coastal Sierra de los Tuxtlas of Veracruz and the Chiapas Highlands and Sierra Madre de Chiapas of Chiapas, and scattered sites in the eastern Sierra Madre del Sur and southern Sierra Madre Oriental. It is also found in the Sierra Madre de Chiapas and Guatemalan Highlands of Guatemala, the Maya Mountains of Belize, and the Chortis Highlands of El Salvador and Honduras. The species' estimated area of occupancy (AOO) is 580 km^{2}, which may be an under-estimate due to under-sampling.

The species' habitat includes old-growth cloud forests and other types of montane humid forest, from 1,000 to 2,400 meters elevation. It can be locally abundant in suitable habitats, but is often scarce across its range.

== Conservation and threats ==
The species is threatened with habitat loss from deforestation of cloud forests in Mexico and Central America. Threats to the species and its habitat include livestock grazing, firewood collection, timber harvesting, shifting cultivation, and conversion forest to agriculture or livestock pasture. Its subpopulations are fragmented, and the number of mature individuals is declining. The species is assessed as near threatened.
