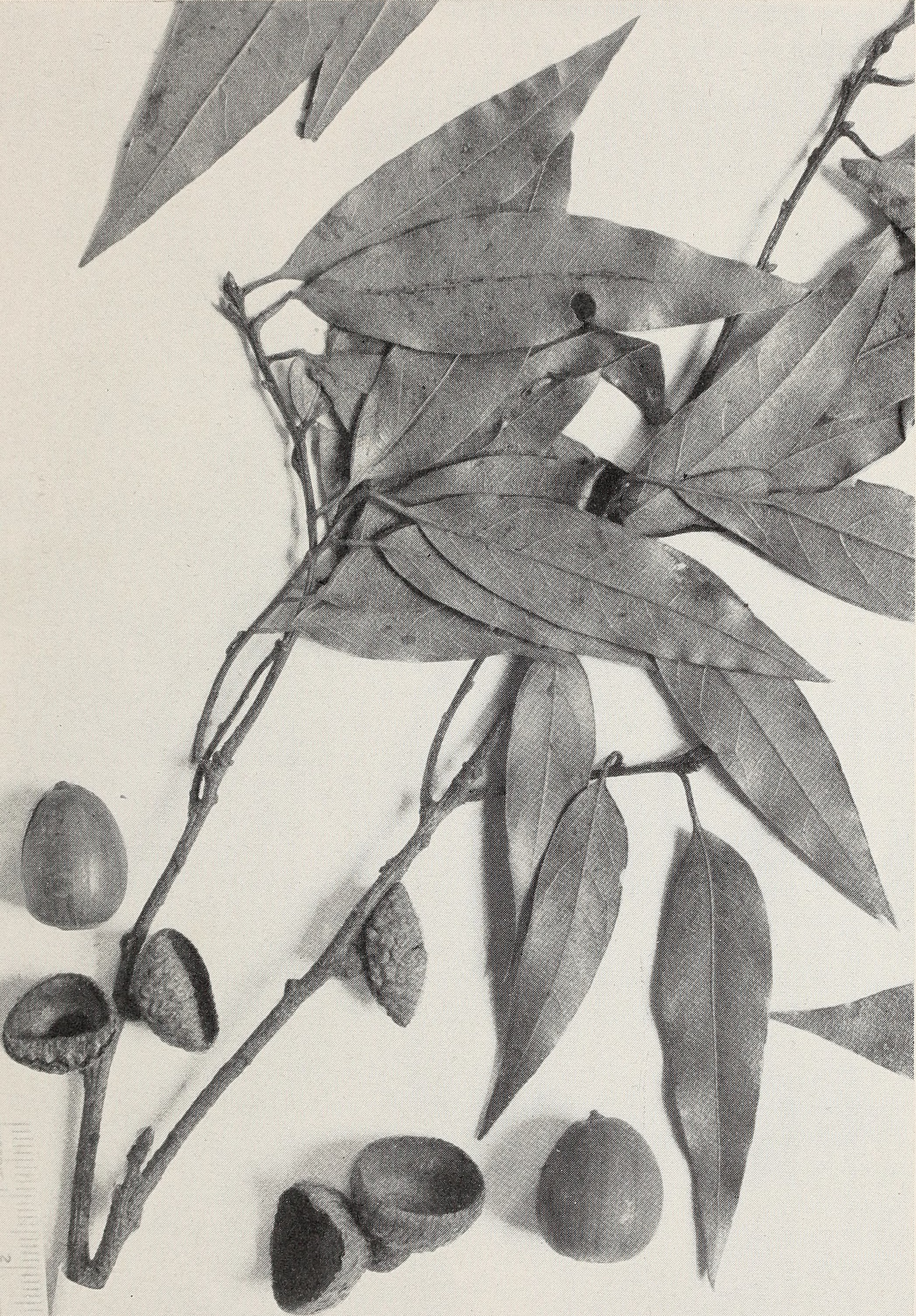

Conservation status
- Least Concern (IUCN 3.1)

Scientific classification
- Kingdom: Plantae
- Clade: Embryophytes
- Clade: Tracheophytes
- Clade: Spermatophytes
- Clade: Angiosperms
- Clade: Eudicots
- Clade: Rosids
- Order: Fagales
- Family: Fagaceae
- Genus: Quercus
- Subgenus: Quercus subg. Quercus
- Section: Quercus sect. Lobatae
- Species: Q. acatenangensis

Binomial name
- Quercus acatenangensis Trel. (1924)

Synonyms
- Quercus acutifolia var. longifolia A.DC. (1864); Quercus longifolia Liebm. (1854), nom. illeg.; Quercus xalapensis var. longifolia (A.DC.) Wenz. (1884)

= Quercus acatenangensis =

Species of oak

Quercus acatenangensis is species of oak. It is a tree native to mountains of Oaxaca and Chiapas states in southern Mexico, Guatemala, and El Salvador.

Quercus acatenangensis grows 25 to 30 meters tall, with a trunk up to 1 meter in diameter. It is native to pine-oak forests in the eastern Sierra Madre del Sur, southern Sierra Madre de Oaxaca, Chiapas Highlands, and Sierra Madre de Chiapas, from 1,500 to 2,900 meters elevation.
