= Chinkultic =

Archeological ruin in Chiapas, Mexico

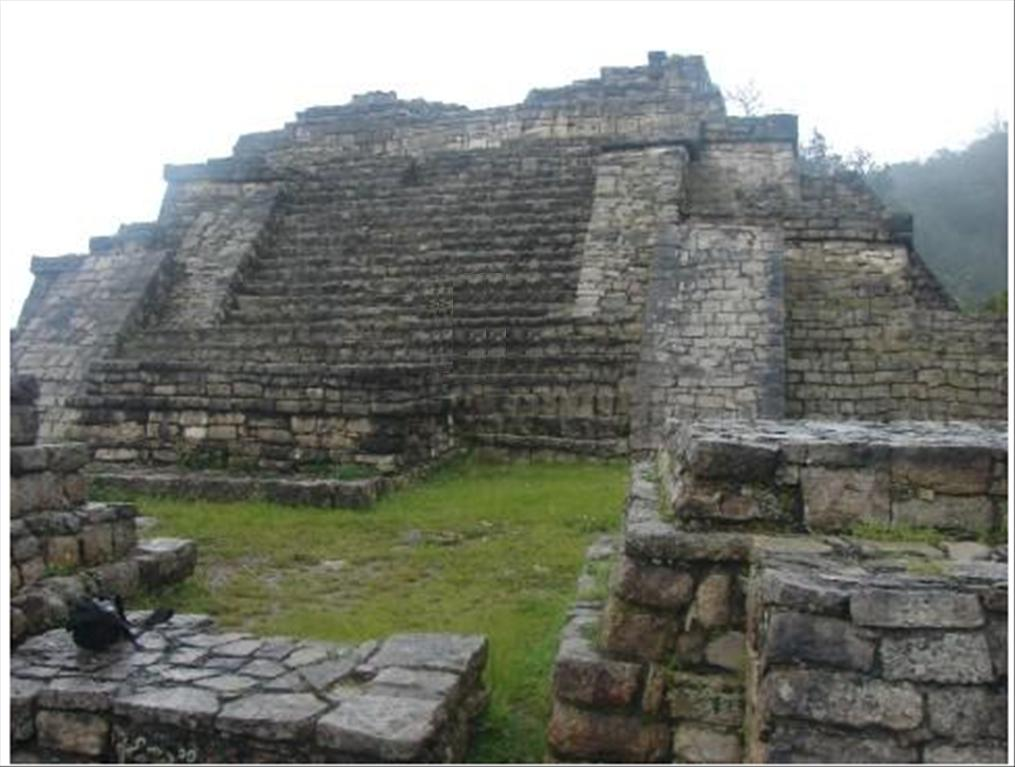
- Structure 1 (Acropolis)

- Location in Mexico
- 16°7′34″N 91°47′0″W
- Cultures: Maya civilization
- Location: Comitán, Chiapas, Mexico
- Region: Chiapas

History
- Built: 3rd century
- Abandoned: 13th century

Site notes
- Archaeologists: Edward Seler, Enrique Juan Palacios

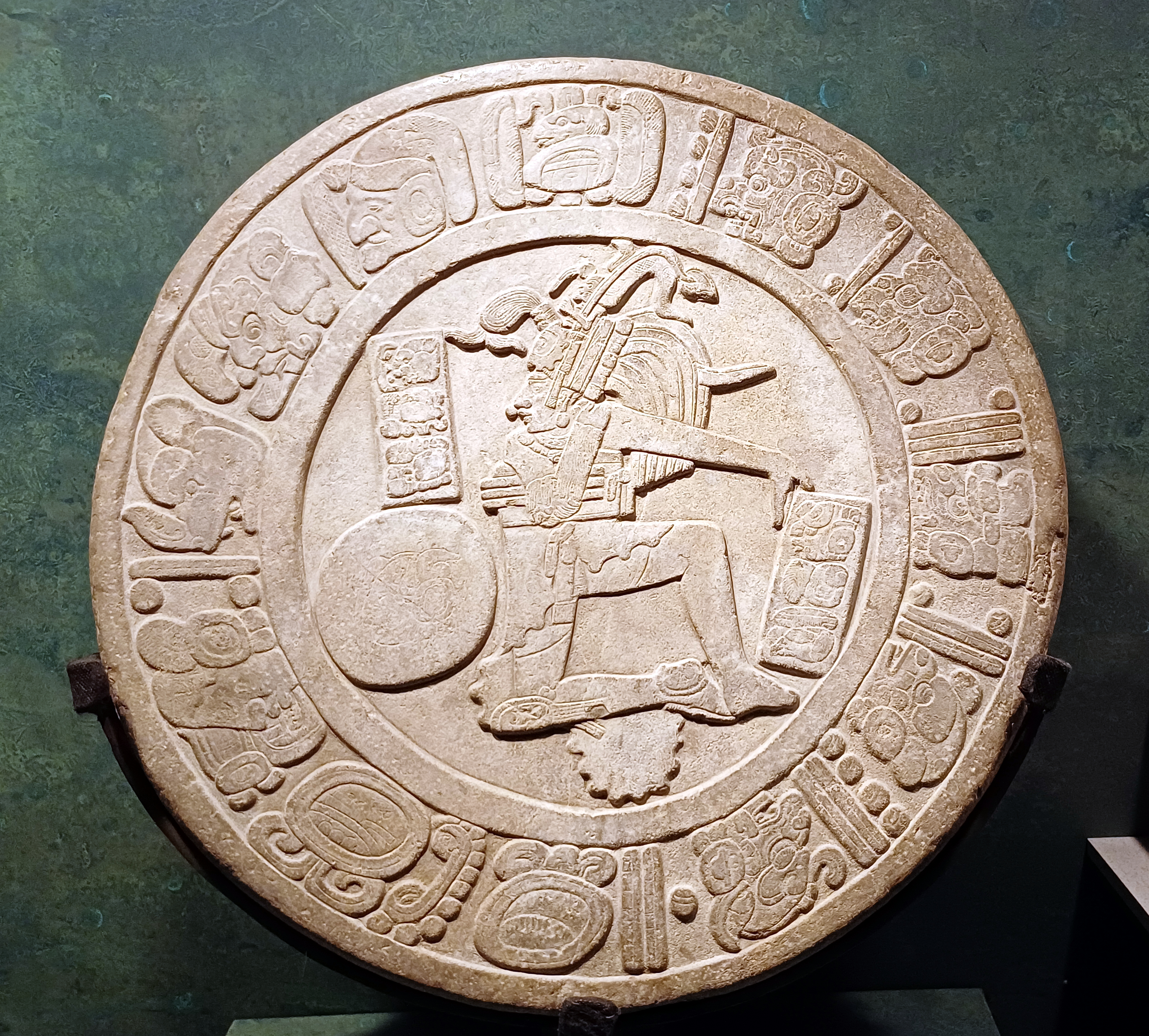
Ballcourt marker from Chinkultic. In the National Museum of Anthropology, Mexico City

Chinkultic, sometimes Chincultic, is a moderate-size archeological ruin in the state of Chiapas, Mexico. It is part of the Lagunas de Montebello National Park.

This pre-Columbian city belongs to the ancient Maya civilization. The city flourished in the Maya Classic Era, from about the 3rd through the 9th century. Most of the sculptures were produced in the last 300 years of this era, with hieroglyphic inscriptions dating from 591 to 897. Post-Classic-Era occupation of the site continued until the 13th century, after which it was abandoned.

The site has some step-pyramids and some 200 smaller buildings, most in undisturbed ruin. Chinkultic has carved stone stelae depicting the site's rulers. The stelae are thought to depict the accession of the rulers as warriors, shown through the shields and spears they carry. Other sites have depictions like this, however they usually focus more on cosmology. In the case of Chinkultic, the focus is all on the rulers as warriors. The site contains a court for playing the Mesoamerican ballgame, which a marker tells us was dedicated on 21 May 591.

Other stelae present at Chinkultic display rulers authority, showing a ruler and then a figure who is clearly subordinate. These stelae depict scattering rituals which are very similar to ones depicted at the sites of Bonampak and Yaxchilan. What makes the figures at Chinkultic different is that they are dressed in long robes with a War Serpent headdress and a necklace of severed heads. This emphasizes the focus on warfare found throughout Chinkultic.

The similarities listed above suggest some sort of artistic communication between Chinkultic and Yaxchilan, however it was not as though Chinkultic copied everything about Yaxchilan stelae. Chinkultic artists mixed the borrowed artistic traditions with their own to create stelae that had similarities but also differences, as is mentioned earlier.

The first published account of the site was made by Edward Seler in the late 19th century. A detailed description of the site was made by Enrique Juan Palacios in 1926.

The first archeological investigations of the site were conducted in 1966 under the direction of Stephan F. de Borhegyi of the Public Museum of Milwaukee, Wisconsin.

Starting in 1970, some further excavations and restorations of a few buildings was conducted by Mexican government archeologists, who also dredged some artifacts from the site's cenote or natural well known as Agua Azul ("Blue Water"). The cenote gives the site its Maya language name; Chinkultic meaning "stepped-cenote".

The site is open for tourism visits, although it is not one of the more commonly visited Maya sites.

== Possible History of Conflict ==
The stelae found in Chinkultic seem to be focused on warfare and on political control, which Caitlin C. Earley hypothosizes indicates a history of conflict with other Maya polities. Who these polities might have been is hard to say, but because Chinkultic is never mentioned in hieroglyphs in Usumacinta, it is likely they were never directly involved there. What this suggests is that instead of conflict, there might have been a network of art and artistic communication that was independent from political communication and conflict.
