= Lagunas de Montebello National Park =

National park in Chiapas, Mexico

- Parque Nacional Lagunas de Montebello
- IUCN category II (national park)
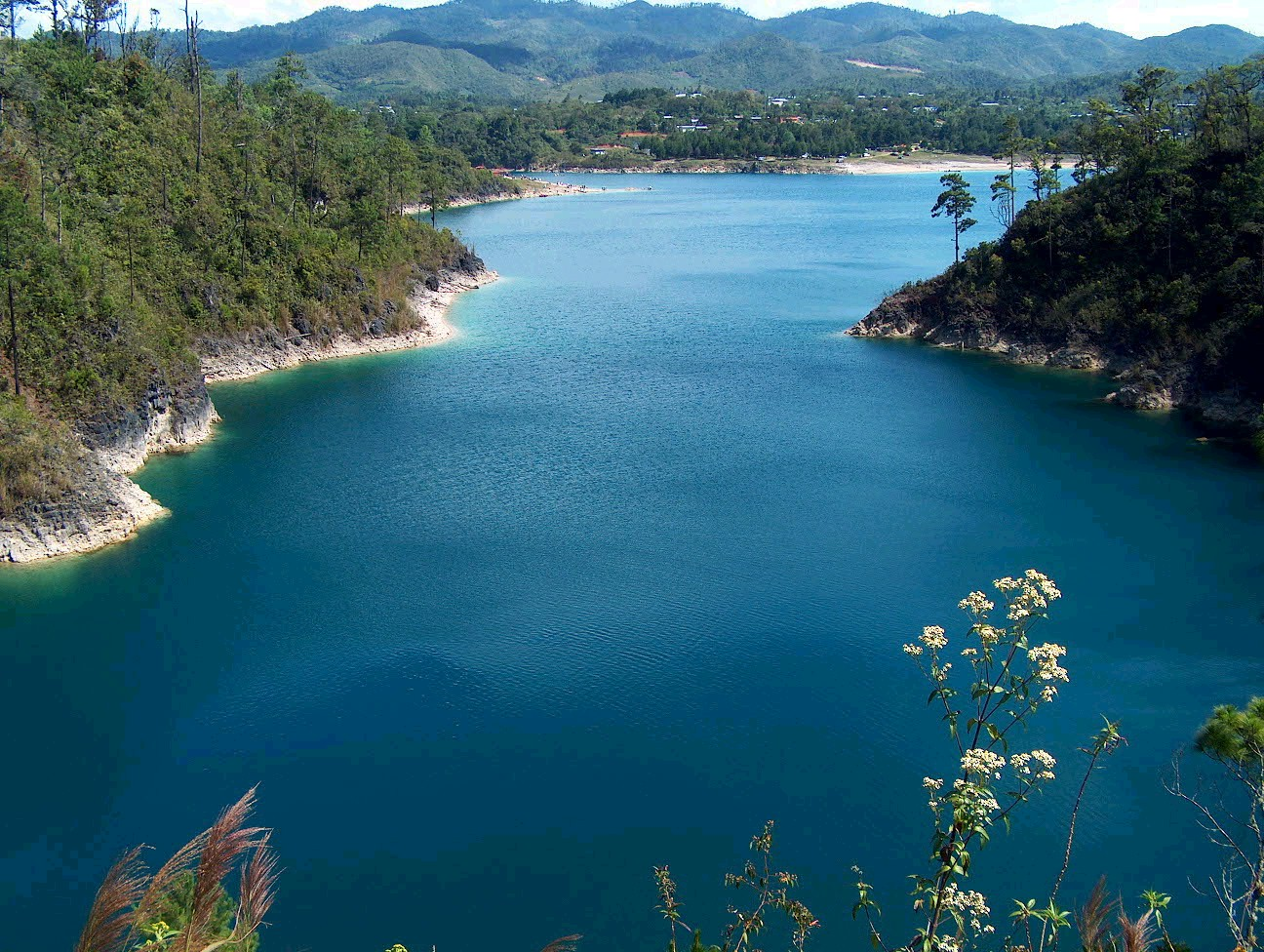
- Lake Tziscao

- Location within Mexico
- Location: Chiapas, Mexico
- Nearest city: Comitán
- Coordinates: 16°07′N 91°42′W
- Area: 6,411 hectares (15,840 acres)
- Established: 1959
- Governing body: Comisión Nacional de Áreas Naturales Protegidas

Ramsar Wetland
- Official name: Parque Nacional Lagunas de Montebello
- Designated: 27 November 2003
- Reference no.: 1325

Lagunas de Montebello, or Montebello Lakes, (Spanish: Parque Nacional Lagunas de Montebello) is a national park in the Mexican state of Chiapas, near the border with Guatemala, comprising 59 multi-colored lakes in a pine forest and two Maya ruins. It was the first national park in Chiapas when created in 1959, and in 2009 the park was designated a Biosphere Reserve by UNESCO.

== Location ==
The Lagunas de Montebello National Park is in the municipalities of La Trinitaria and La Independencia in southeastern Chiapas state, close to Guatemala. The nearest city is Comitán, an hour's drive to the west; the popular tourist city of San Cristóbal de las Casas is a further two more hours to the west.

== Geography ==
The Lagunas de Montebello National Park covers an area of 6,411 hectares (15,840 acres), of which 3,412 hectares (8,430 acres) are considered the "core area". It is located on the high plains of Chiapas, with an altitude between 1,500 and 1,800 metres (4,900 and 5,900 ft) above sea level.

== Montebello Lakes ==
The main attractions of the national park are its 59 lakes, collectively called the Montebello Lakes. The lakes are famous for their striking colors, which vary due to their different mineral contents, ranging from emerald and turquoise to dark green, and even purple and reddish black. About 15 of the lakes are easily accessible by car or foot. Lago Tziscao is the largest of the lakes with a village nearby. Other lakes include Montebello, La Cañada, Pojoj, and a group of five lakes known as the Lagunas de Colores (Lakes of Colors: Encantada, Ensueño, Esmeralda, Agua Tinta, and Bosque Azul). Many of the lakes are open for swimming, canoeing, and kayaking. There are also cenotes and a group of limestone caves called Grutas San Rafael del Arco in the park that can be visited on foot or horseback. Scientists have recently expressed concern that the lakes are losing their colours and becoming muddy and lifeless. This is due to untreated wastewater and agricultural runoff entering the lakes (via the Grande River which flows directly into the lakes) and deforestation of parts of the lake basins.

Metzabok Lake, which normally covers 220 acres (89 hectares), dried up completely in August 2019 due to drought. Another six lagoons outside the park have also dried up.

== Maya ruins ==
Also within the park boundary are the medium-sized Maya ruins of Chinkultic, a pre-Columbian city that dates back to the third century and was abandoned in the 13th century. The site is not thoroughly excavated and many of the buildings are still hidden under vegetation. A beautiful view can be seen of many of the national park's multi-colored lakes from the top of the Acropolis, the main pyramid. There are nearly 200 buildings including several pyramids and a unique asymmetrical ball court, whose hieroglyphic inscriptions indicate it was dedicated in May 591. Carved stelae depicting Chinkultic's rulers are scattered among the ruins.

== Gallery ==
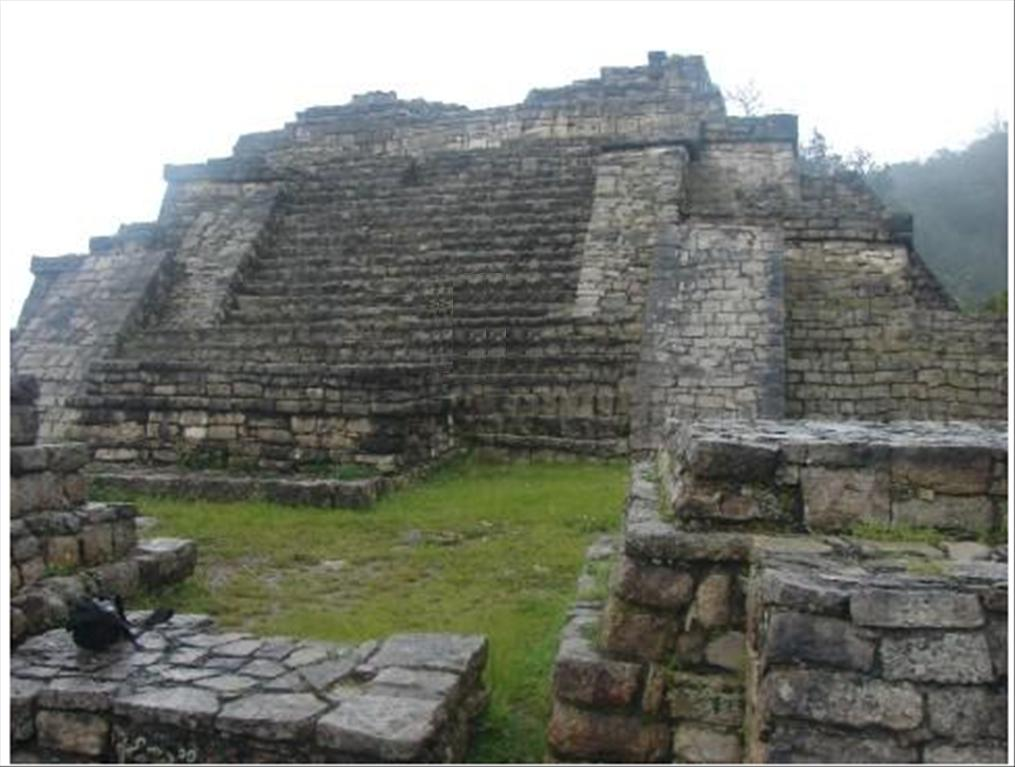
Acropolis of Chinkultic

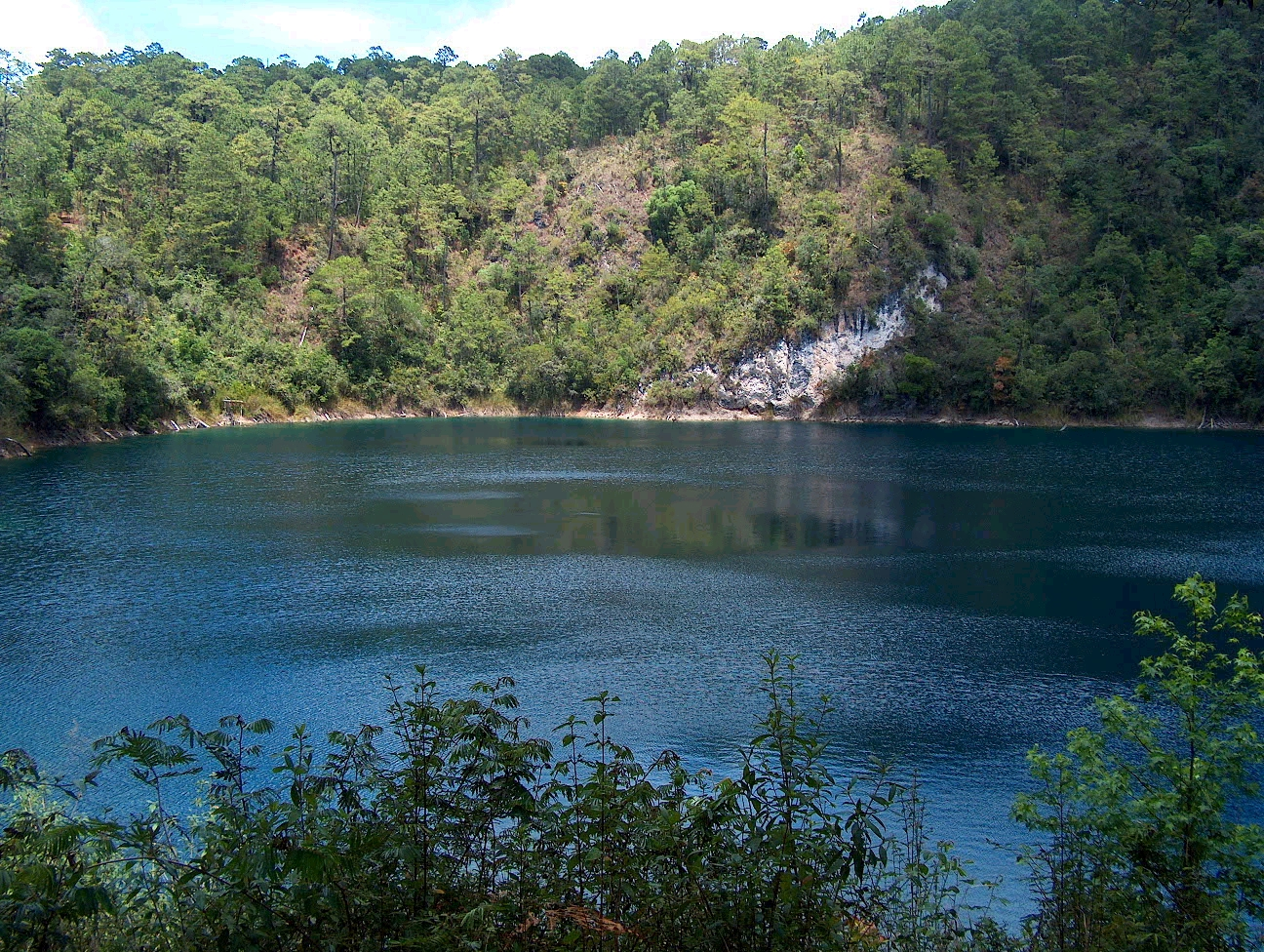
Laguna Ensueño

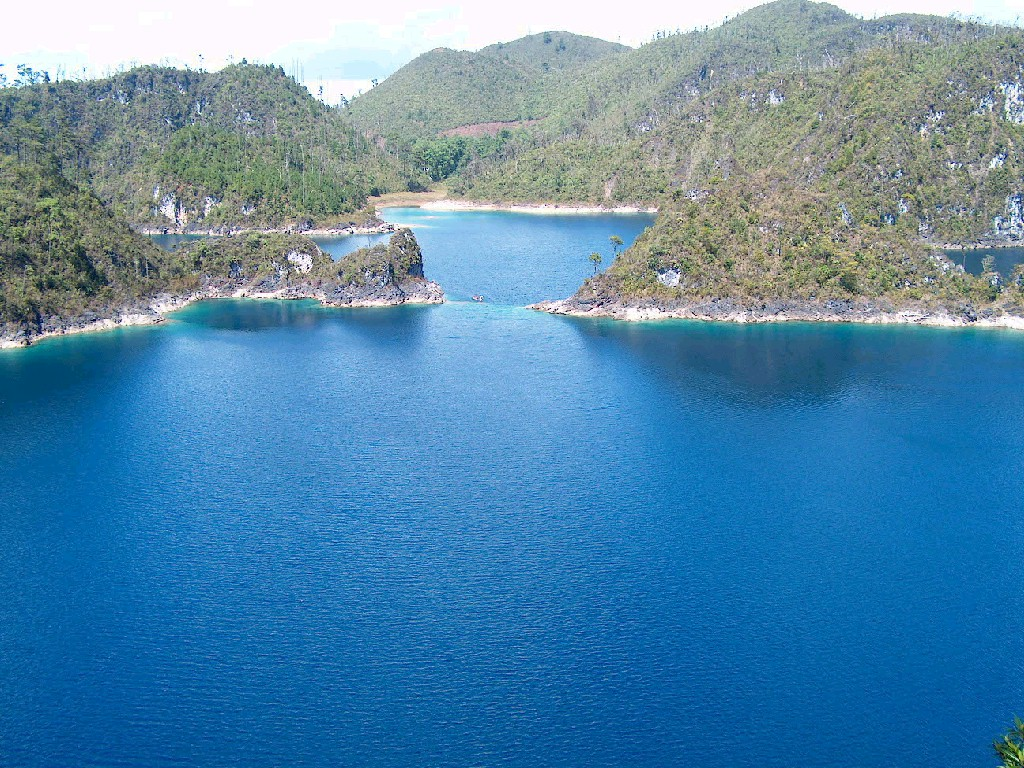
Lago Peña Blanca

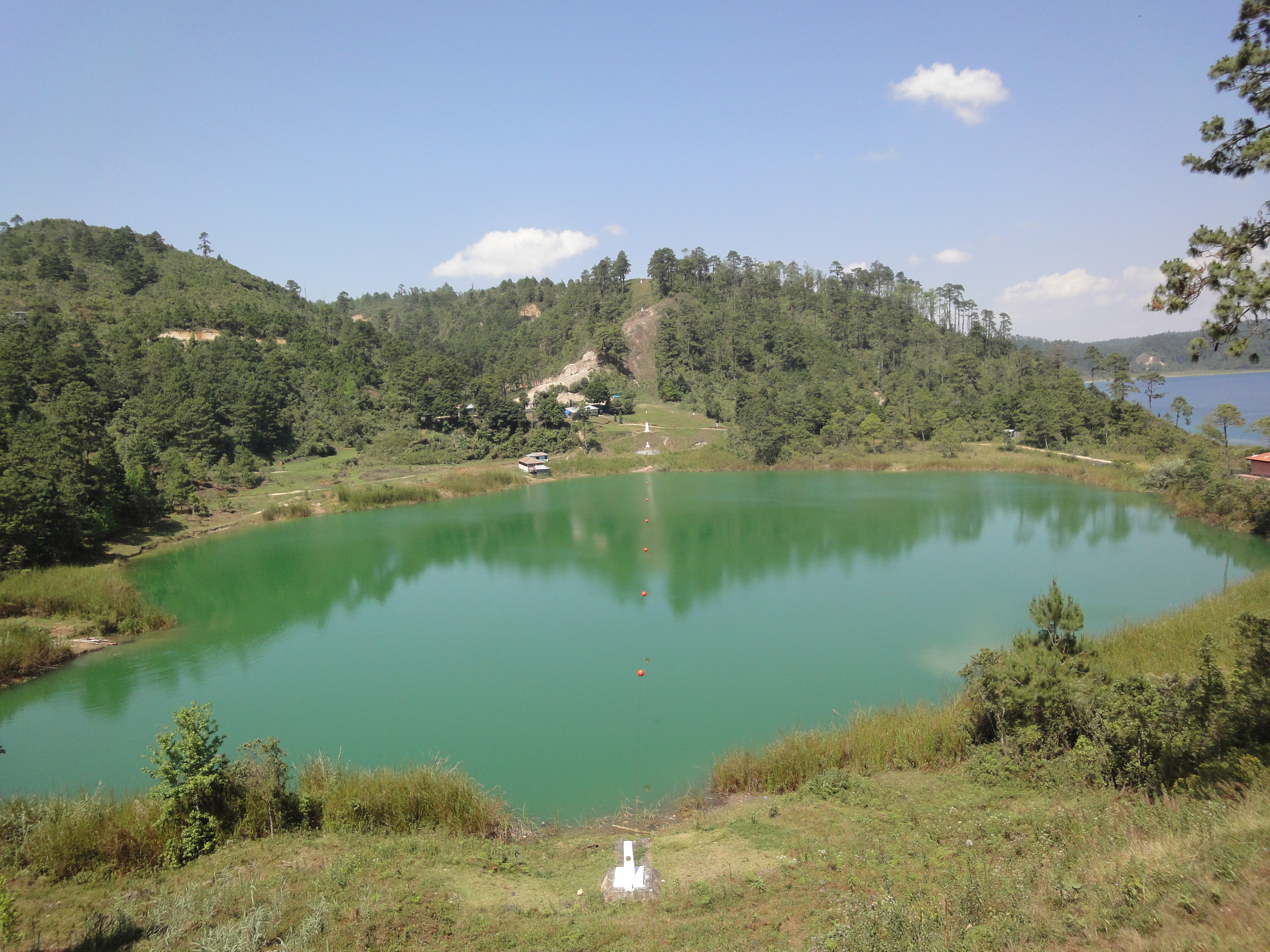
Border between Guatemala (left) and Mexico (right)

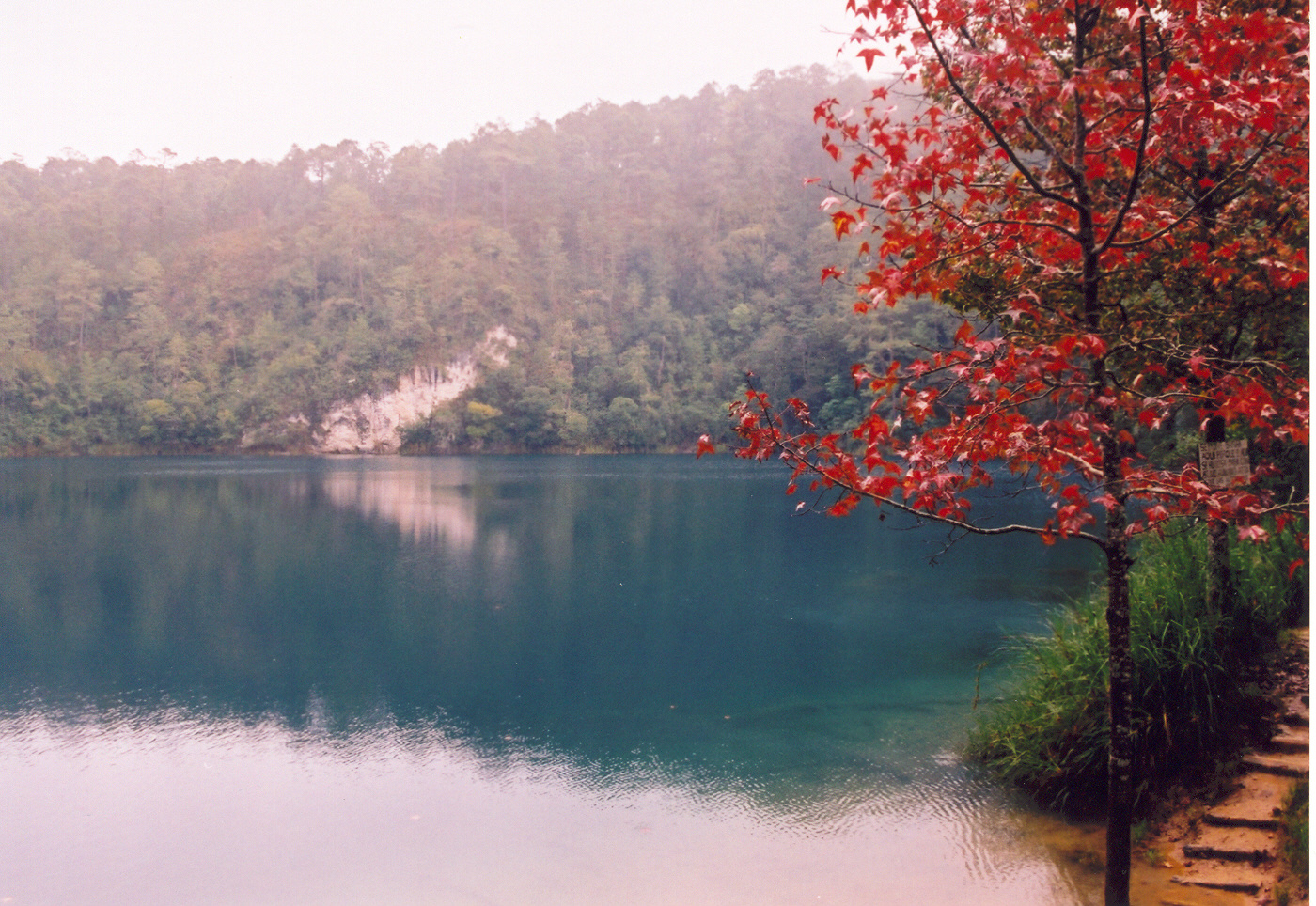
Mexican liquidambar at a lakeshore

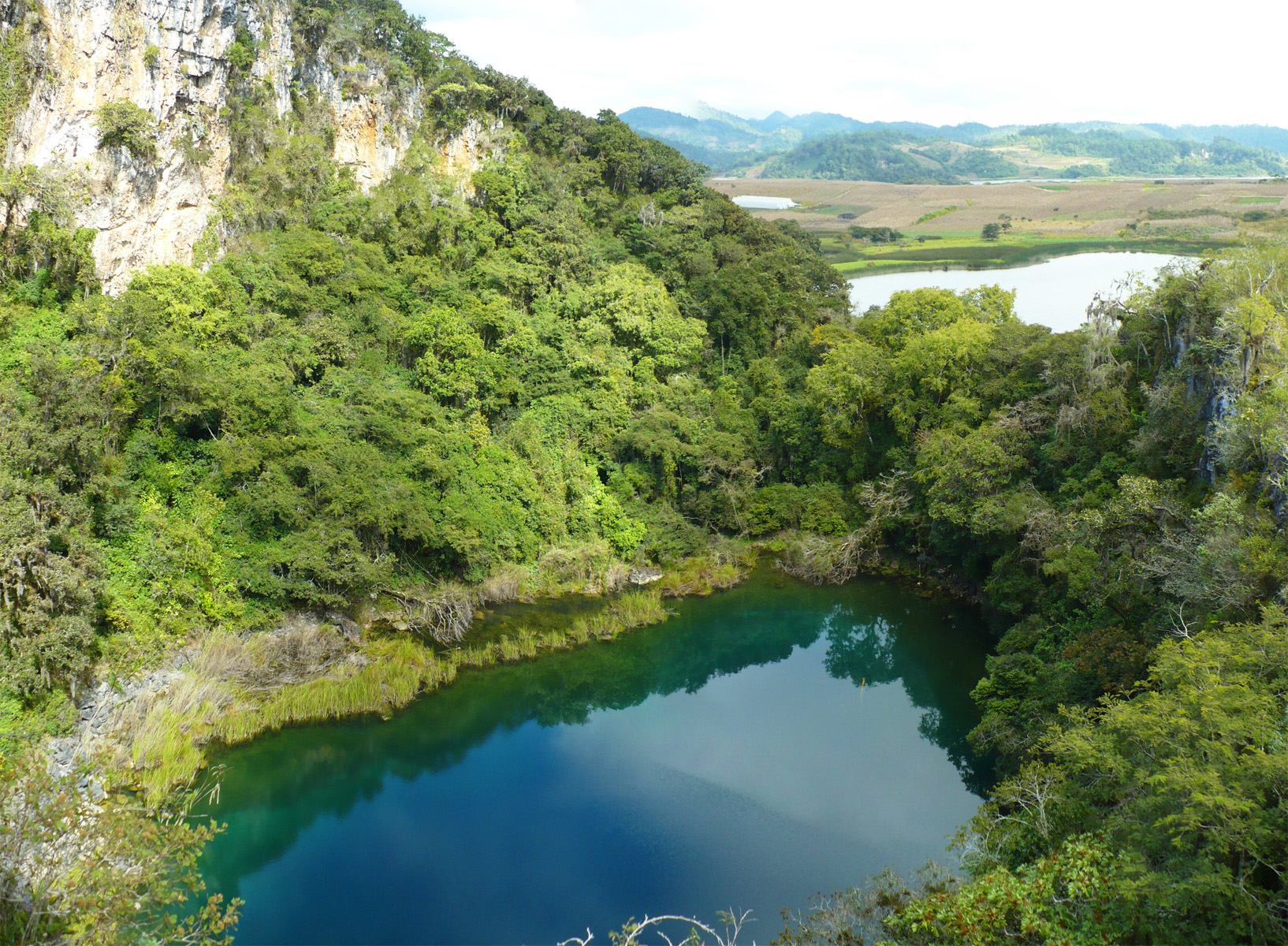
Panorama from Chinkultic

== See also ==
- List of national parks of Mexico
