= Cerro Apante Nature Reserve =

Nature reserve in Nicaragua

Coordinates: 12.896742707841074°N 85.89840553469199°W

Cerro Apante Natural Reserve is a nature reserve in Nicaragua near Matagalpa. It is one of the 78 reserves that are under official protection in the country.
