= Yucul Genetic Reserve =

Nature reserve in Nicaragua

Coordinates: 12.9204°N 85.7555°W

Yucul Genetic Reserve is a 4,826 hectares (18.63 sq mi) nature reserve in Nicaragua. It is one of the 78 reserves which are officially under protection in the country.
