= Chiapas Depression dry forests =

Ecoregion in northwestern Central America

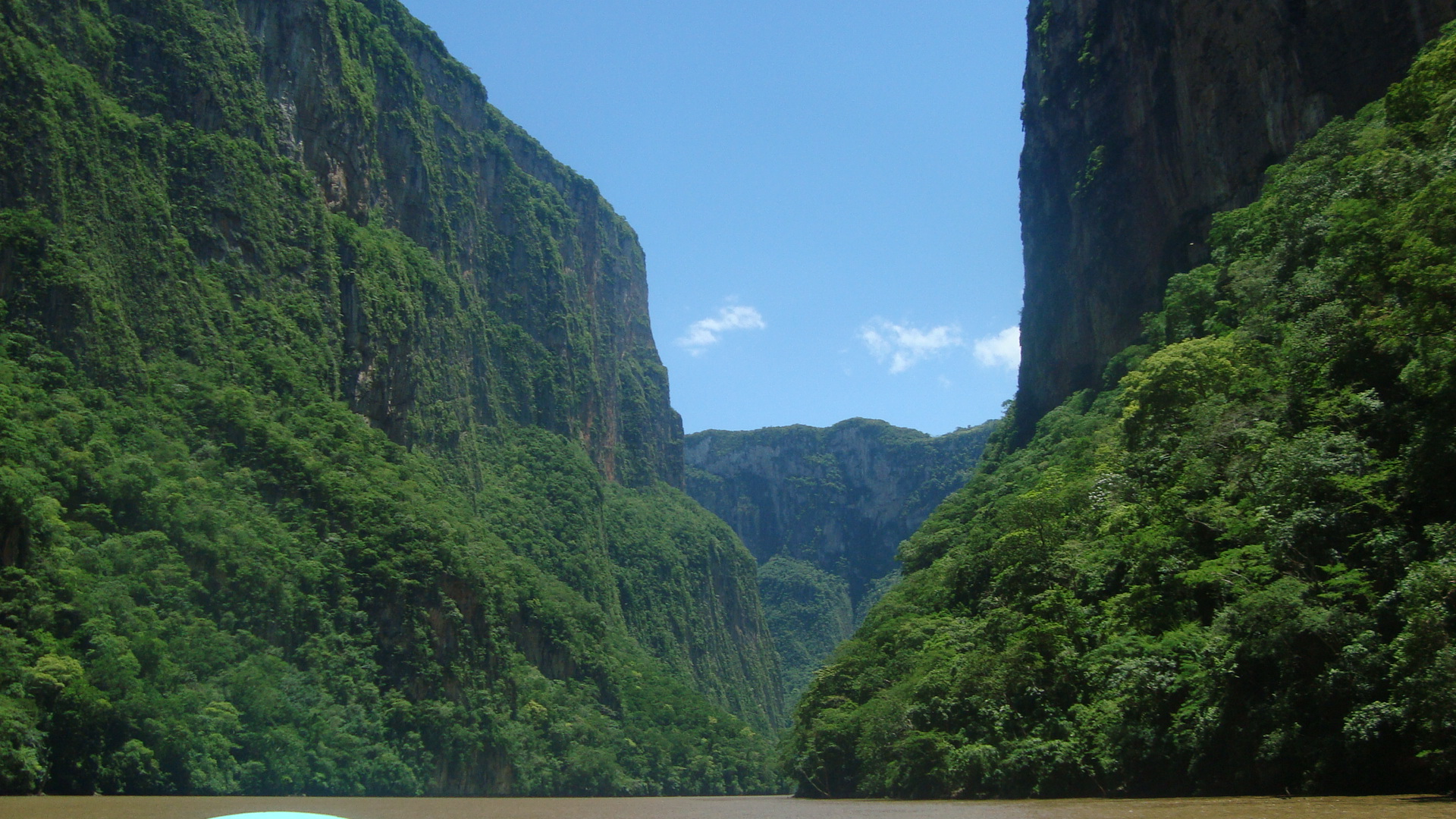
- Chiapas Depression dry forests in Sumidero Canyon

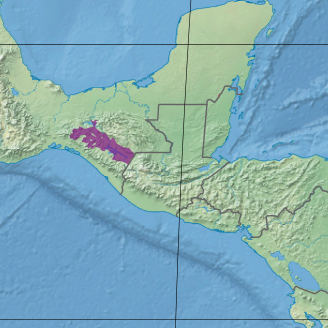
- Ecoregion territory (in purple)

Ecology
- Realm: Neotropical
- Biome: tropical and subtropical dry broadleaf forests
- Borders: Central American pine–oak forests; Chimalapas montane forests; Petén–Veracruz moist forests, Sierra Madre de Chiapas moist forests

Geography
- Area: 13,974 km^{2} (5,395 mi^{2})
- Countries: southern Mexico; Guatemala

Conservation
- Conservation status: Critical/Endangered
- Global 200: Mexican dry forests
- Protected: 309 km² (2%)

The Chiapas Depression dry forests form one of the ecoregions that belong to the tropical and subtropical dry broadleaf forests biome, as defined by the World Wildlife Fund, in northwestern Central America.

== Geography ==
This ecoregion is located in the central Chiapas Depression, which lies between the Chiapas Highlands on the north and the Sierra Madre de Chiapas to the south. The Chiapas Depression is mostly within Chiapas state of Mexico, and extends into northwestern Guatemala. The depression is drained by the Grijalva River.

It covers an area of around 13,900 km^{2}. It lies at an elevation of 420–800 metres (1,380–2,620 ft).

== Climate ==
The Chiapas Depression dry forests ecoregion has a hot, seasonally dry climate - warm sub-humid in the lowlands, transitioning to semi-warm humid on mountain slopes. It lies in the rain shadow of the Chiapas Highlands to the north and the Sierra Madre de Chiapas to the south, and is drier than the surrounding highlands and nearby lowlands. Much of the rainfall occurs in the summer, and there is a long dry season lasting four to six months. Average annual precipitation can be less than 800 mm in the driest areas.

== Flora ==
Tropical deciduous dry forest is the predominant plant community. Many trees lose their leaves during the long dry season, and the appearance of the forest changes dramatically between wet and dry seasons. The forests are generally low-canopied, and characteristic trees include Lysiloma divaricatum, Mexican alvaradoa (Alvaradoa amorphoides), peacock flower (Caesalpinia pulcherrima), ceiba or kapok (Ceiba pentandra), buttercup tree (Cochlospermum vitifolium), Comocladia engleriana, butterfly orchid tree (Bauhinia divaricata) and Bursera spp. Cactus and other succulent plants are common.

Semi-deciduous and semi-evergreen forests of medium height are found in canyons and other areas with higher soil moisture, and in the northwestern transition to the Petén–Veracruz moist forests. Montezuma cypress (Taxodium mucronatum) and fig (Ficus spp.) grow in riverine forests.

There are areas of savanna in the central and northwestern parts of the ecoregion. Grasslands, including many introduced grasses, and palm groves are found in areas disturbed by human activity and livestock grazing.

Its biodiversity is high, with about 980 plant species, and includes 40% of the endemic species of dry ecosystems found in Mexico. It also forms a corridor that connects two major biogeographic region, the Gulf of Mexico on the east and the Pacific in the west.

== Fauna ==
Native mammals include the gray fox (Urocyon cinereoargenteus), hooded skunk (Mephitis macroura), and hog-nosed skunk (Conepatus mesoleucos), particularly in isolated sierras and canyons less disturbed by human activity.

Characteristic birds include the plain chachalaca (Ortalis vetula), mottled owl (Strix virgata), lesser roadrunner (Geococcyx velox), and white-throated magpie-jay (Calocitta formosa).

Native snakes include the boa constrictor (Boa constrictor) and neotropical rattlesnake (Crotalus durissus).

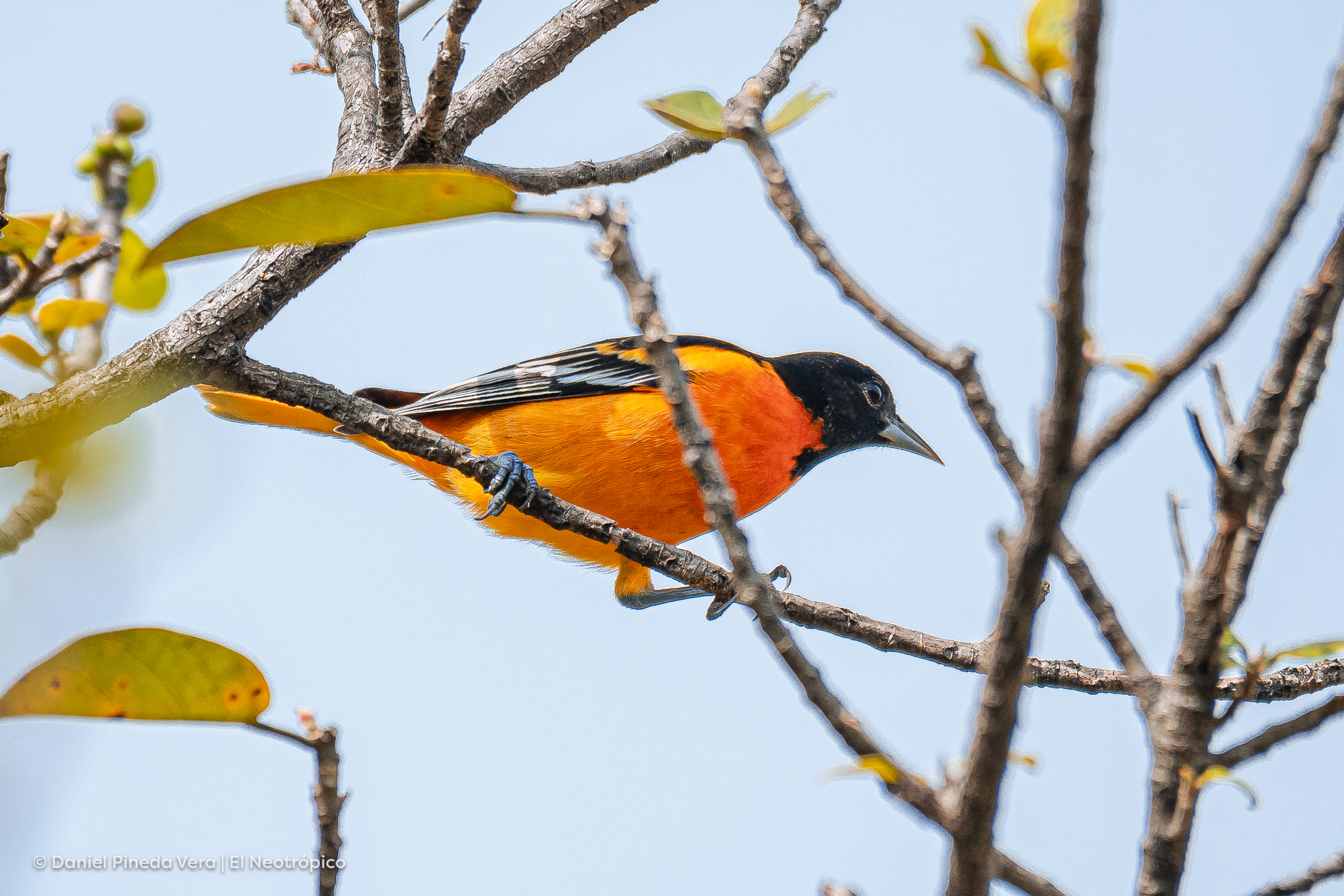
Icterus galbula in Tuxtla Gutiérrez, Mexico

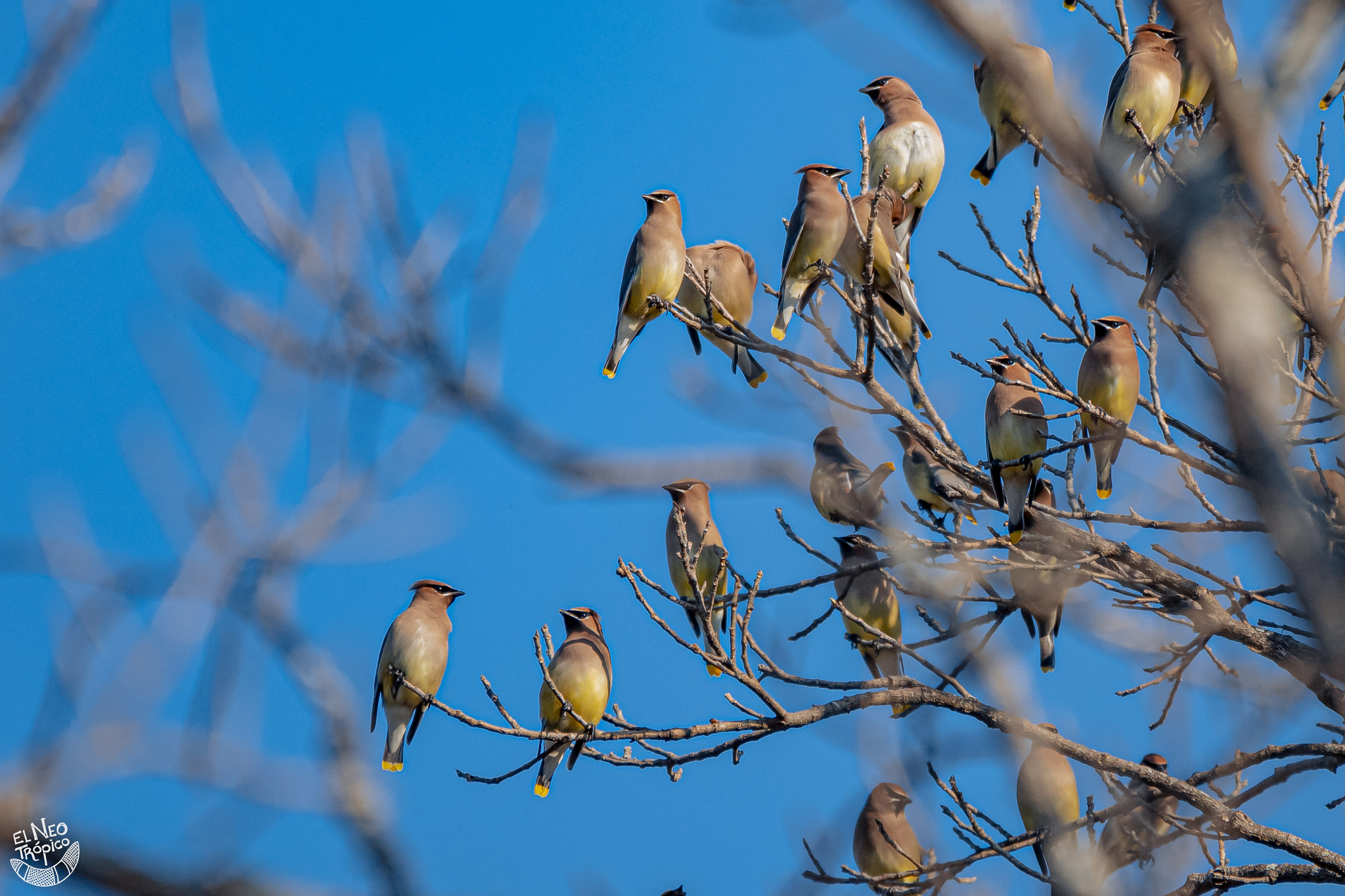
Bombycilla cedrorum in Chiapa de Corzo, Mexico

== Conservation and threats ==
The ecoregion has been seriously threatened by cattle grazing, which is the main cause of its destruction, along with the effects of logging and the expansion of the agricultural frontier.

Much of the ecoregion has been converted to cropland, including corn, beans, and peanuts, with sugarcane and corn in irrigated areas. Large areas have been cleared for pasturing cattle, which graze on introduced grasses.

Tuxtla Gutiérrez is the largest city in the ecoregion.

== Protected areas ==
A 2017 assessment found that 309 km^{2}, or 2%, of the ecoregion is in protected areas. Protected areas in the ecoregion include Sumidero Canyon National Park and a portion of La Sepultura Biosphere Reserve.

== See also ==
- List of ecoregions in Mexico
- Tropical and subtropical dry broadleaf forests ecoregions
