= Volcán Yali Natural Reserve =

Nature reserve in Nicaragua

Coordinates: 13.27223°N 86.12437°W

Volcán Yali Natural Reserve is a nature reserve in Nicaragua. It is one of the 78 reserves that are under official protection in the country.
