= Cerro Guabule Nature Reserve =

Nature reserve in Nicaragua

- IUCN category IV (habitat/species management area)
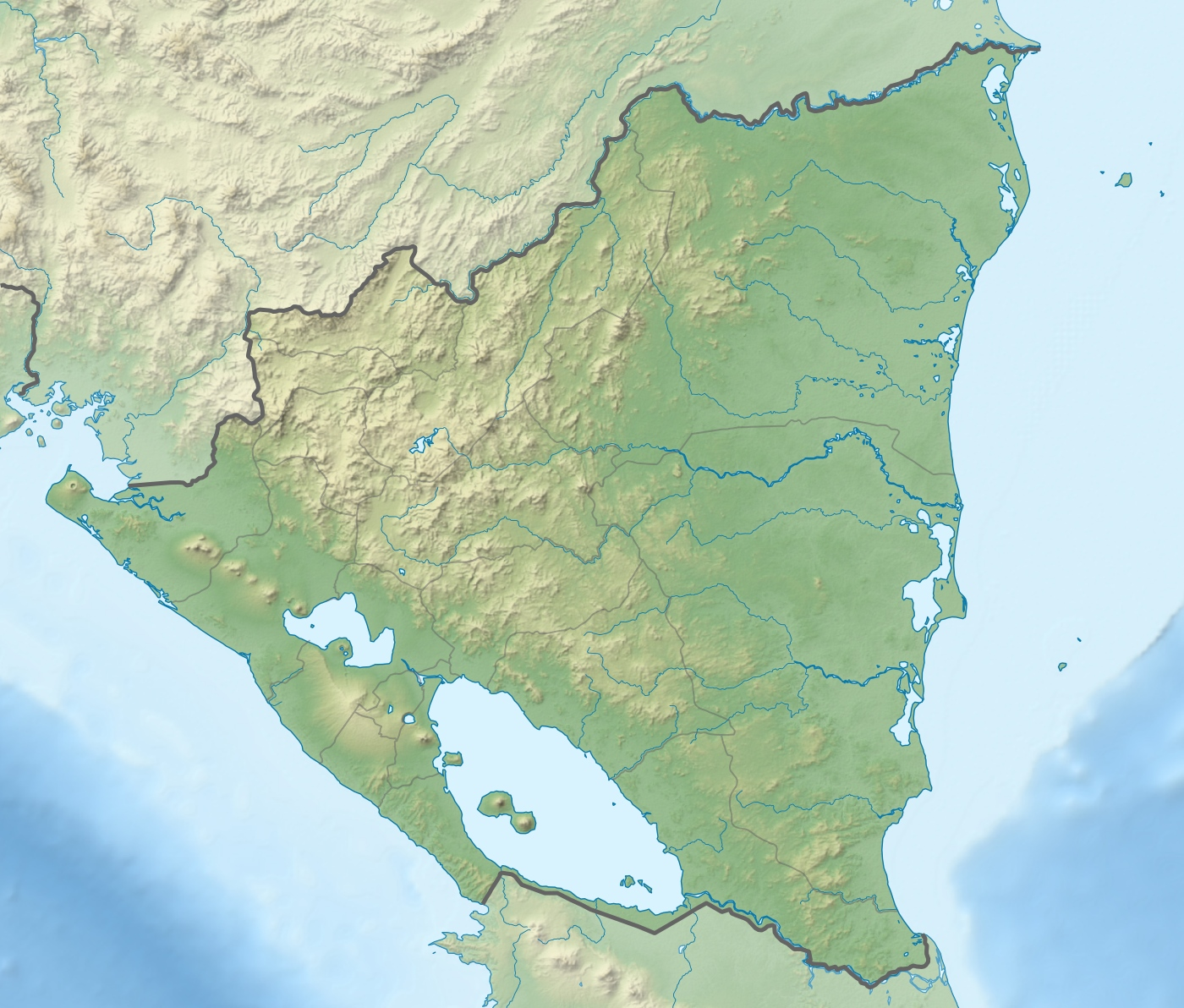
- Location within Nicaragua
- Location: Nicaragua
- Coordinates: 12.944603°N 85.675339°W
- Area: 64.09 square kilometres (24.75 mi^{2})
- Established: 1991
- Governing body: Ministerio del Ambiente y Los Recursos Naturales (MARENA)

Cerro Guabule Natural Reserve is a nature reserve in Nicaragua. It is one of the 78 reserves that are under official protection in the country.
