= Fraxinus hondurensis =

Conservation status
- Critically Endangered (IUCN 2.3)

Scientific classification
- Kingdom: Plantae
- Clade: Tracheophytes
- Clade: Angiosperms
- Clade: Eudicots
- Clade: Asterids
- Order: Lamiales
- Family: Oleaceae
- Genus: Fraxinus
- Species: F. hondurensis

Binomial name
- Fraxinus hondurensis Standl.

Species of ash

Fraxinus hondurensis is a species of Fraxinus, endemic to Honduras.
