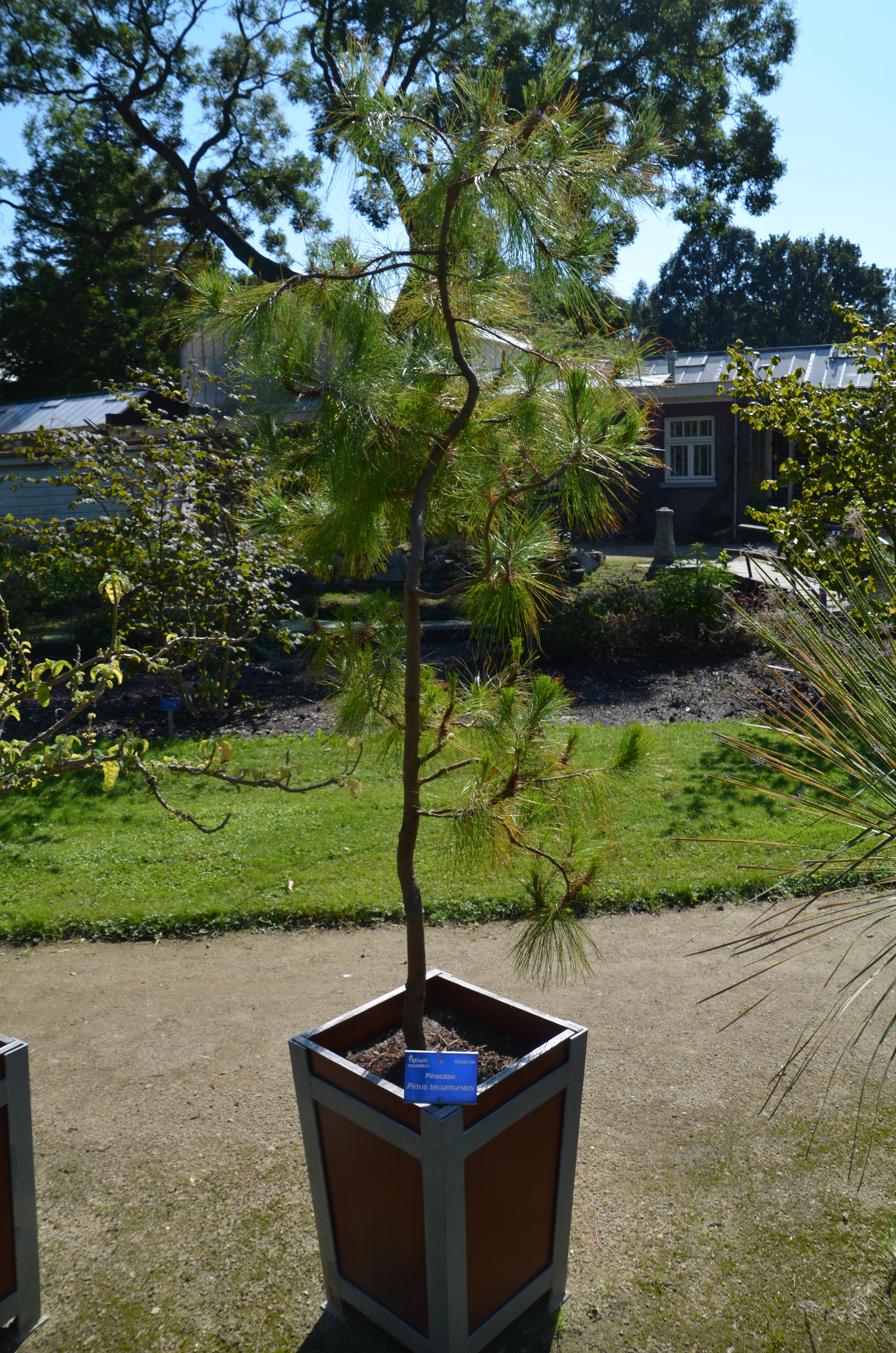

Conservation status
- Vulnerable (IUCN 3.1)

Scientific classification
- Kingdom: Plantae
- Clade: Tracheophytes
- Clade: Gymnosperms
- Division: Pinophyta
- Class: Pinopsida
- Order: Pinales
- Family: Pinaceae
- Genus: Pinus
- Subgenus: P. subg. Pinus
- Section: P. sect. Trifoliae
- Subsection: P. subsect. Australes
- Species: P. tecunumanii

Binomial name
- Pinus tecunumanii F.Schwerdtf. ex Eguiluz & J.P.Perry

Synonyms
- Pinus oocarpa var. ochoterenae Martínez; Pinus patula subsp. tecunumanii (F.Schwerdtf. ex Eguiluz & J.P.Perry) Styles

= Pinus tecunumanii =

Species of conifer

Pinus tecunumanii is a species of conifer in the family Pinaceae, a pine tree native to Mexico and Central America. It grows from the highlands of Chiapas and Oaxaca through Guatemala, Belize, El Salvador, Honduras to Nicaragua (17° to 14° North latitude). It occurs in two separated populations in their native habitats. The high-altitude group grows at 1500–2900 m, and the low-altitude group at 500–1500 m.

The wood is yellowish. This species has been cultivated in several subtropical parts of the world for the paper industry. Cultivation trials have shown that high-elevation sources are the most productive. It grows well in Colombia, Venezuela, Brazil and South Africa.

Pinus tecunumanii was formerly classified as a subspecies of Pinus patula, but DNA analysis has shown that it is a different species, closer to Pinus oocarpa.
