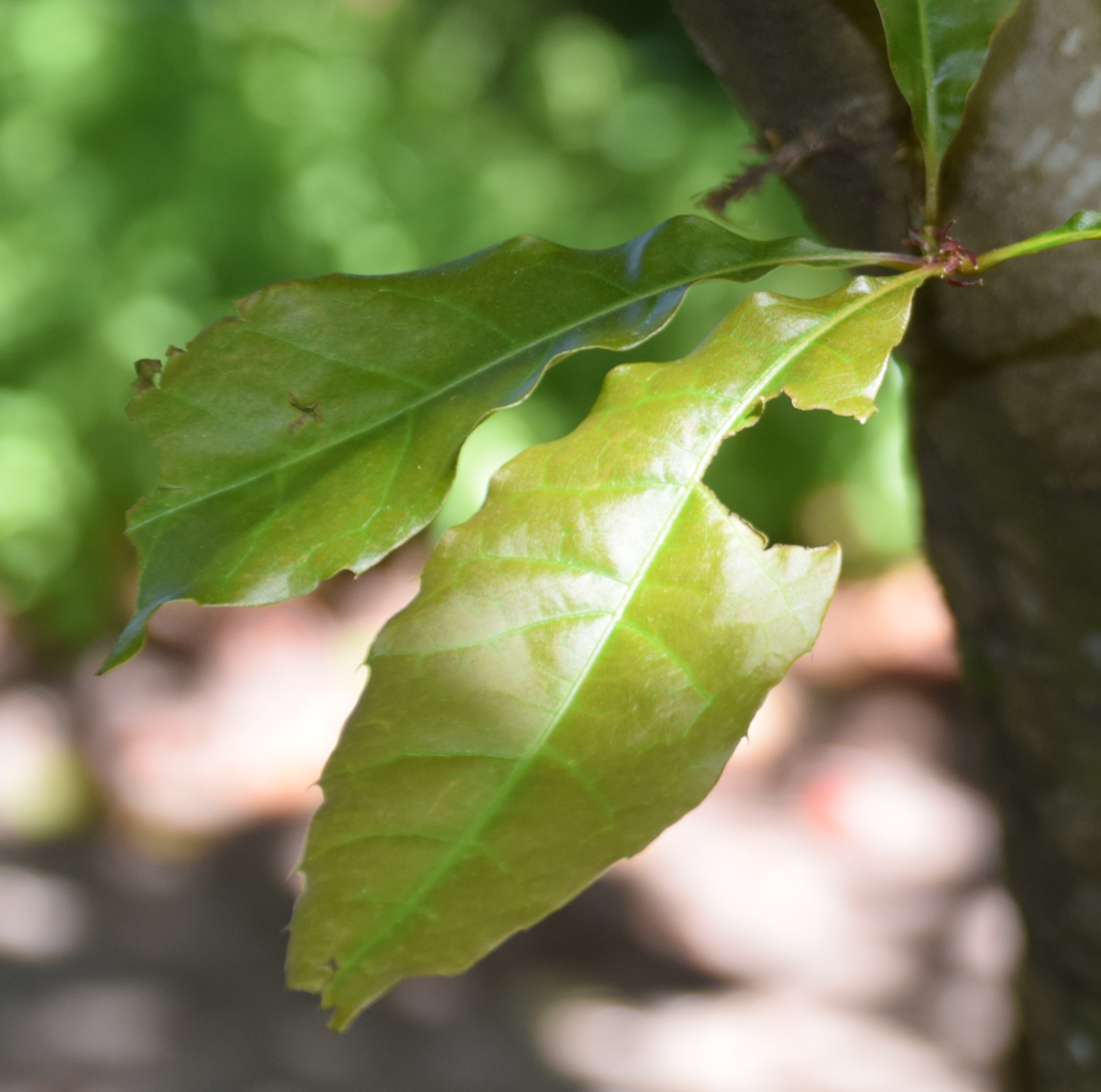

Conservation status
- Vulnerable (IUCN 3.1)

Scientific classification
- Kingdom: Plantae
- Clade: Embryophytes
- Clade: Tracheophytes
- Clade: Spermatophytes
- Clade: Angiosperms
- Clade: Eudicots
- Clade: Rosids
- Order: Fagales
- Family: Fagaceae
- Genus: Quercus
- Subgenus: Quercus subg. Quercus
- Section: Quercus sect. Lobatae
- Species: Q. acutifolia

Binomial name
- Quercus acutifolia Née

Synonyms
- List: Quercus acutifolia f. abrupta Trel.; Quercus acutifolia var. angustifolia A.DC., not validly publ.; Quercus acutifolia var. bonplandii A.DC.; Quercus acutifolia var. conspersa (Benth.) A.DC.; Quercus acutifolia var. microcarpa A.DC.; Quercus anglohondurensis C.H.Mull.; Quercus candolleana Trel.; Quercus conspersa Benth.; Quercus conspersa f. caudata Trel.; Quercus conspersa f. ovatifolia Trel.; Quercus correpta Trel.; Quercus grahamii var. coyulana Trel.; Quercus grahamii var. nelsonii Trel.; Quercus monserratensis C.H.Mull.; Quercus nitida M.Martens & Galeotti; Quercus sartorii Botteri ex A.DC.; Quercus tenuiaristata Trel.; Quercus tonaguiae Trel.; Quercus uruapanensis Trel.

= Quercus acutifolia =

Species of oak tree

Quercus acutifolia, many synonyms including Quercus conspersa, is a species of oak tree. It is native to central and southern Mexico and northern Central America, from Nayarit south as far as Belize and Guatemala.

It is placed in Quercus section Lobatae.

It is a deciduous tree growing up to 12 metres (39 feet) tall with a trunk as much as 30 centimetres (12 inches) in diameter. The leaves are stiff and leathery, rigid, narrowly elliptical, up to 16 cm long, dark green on the top and lighter green underneath, with 8–14 bristly teeth on each side. It retains its leaves until winter and can withstand about -10 °C.

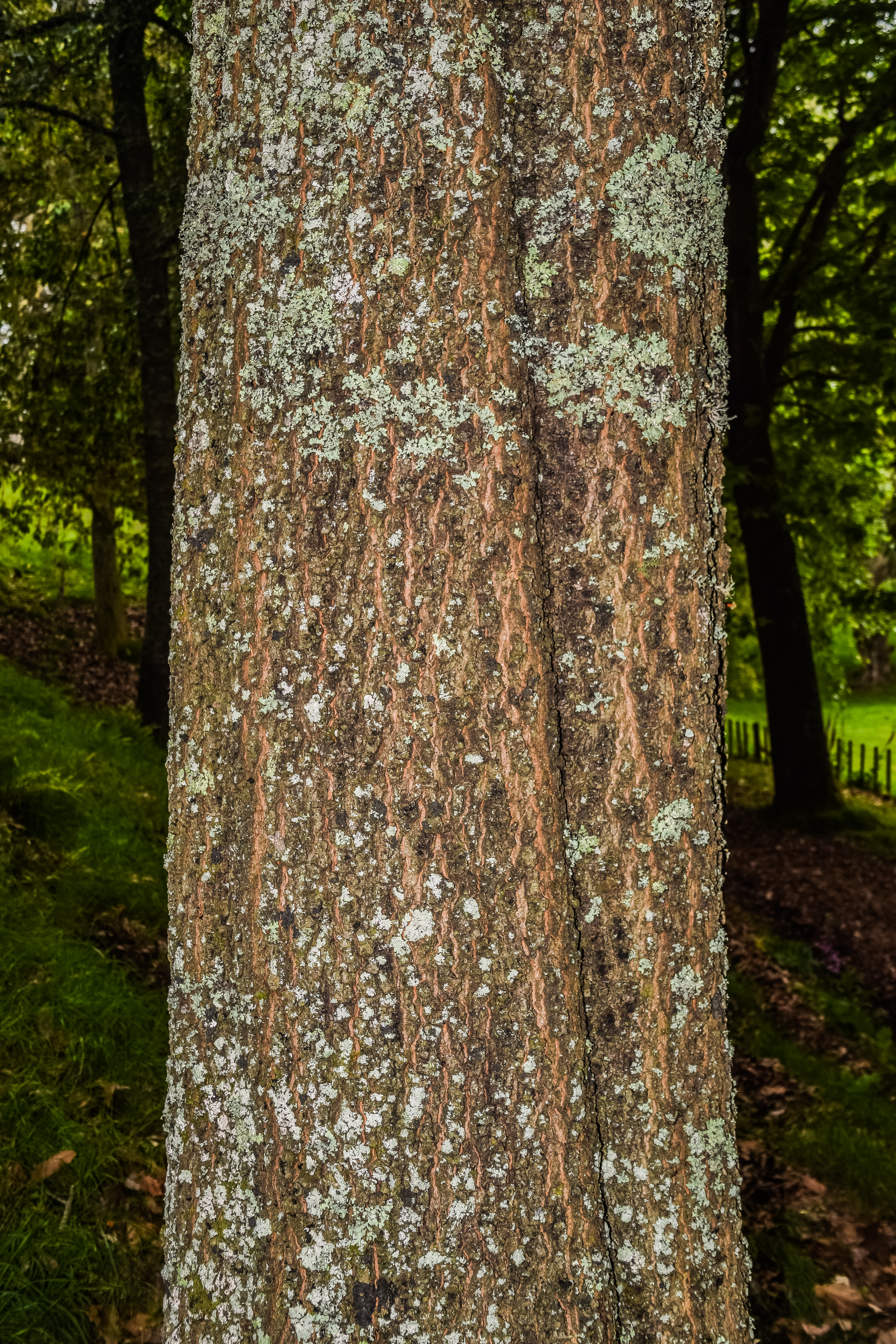
Quercus acutifolia in Hackfalls Arboretum
