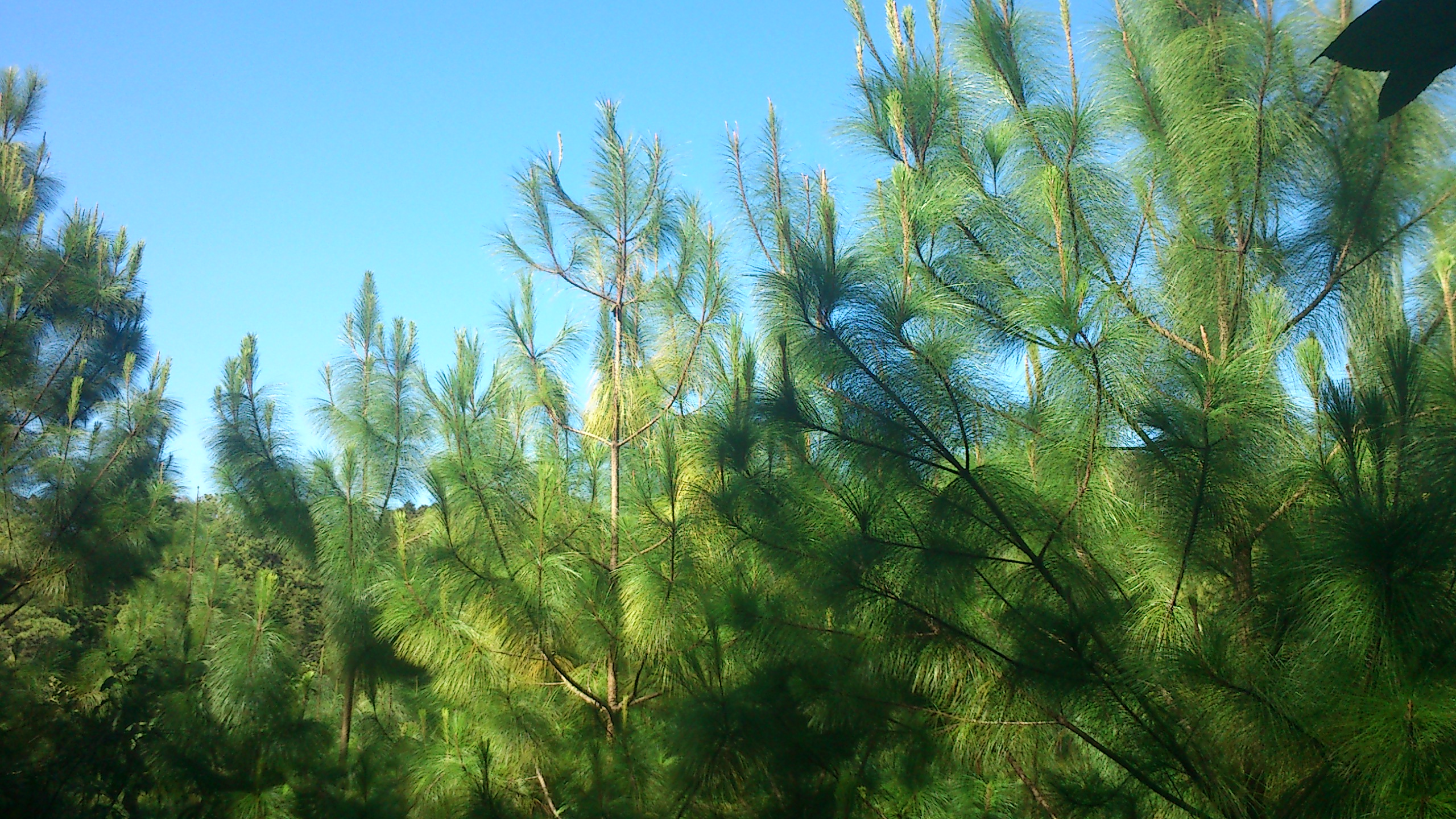

Conservation status
- Least Concern (IUCN 3.1)

Scientific classification
- Kingdom: Plantae
- Clade: Tracheophytes
- Clade: Gymnosperms
- Division: Pinophyta
- Class: Pinopsida
- Order: Pinales
- Family: Pinaceae
- Genus: Pinus
- Subgenus: P. subg. Pinus
- Section: P. sect. Trifoliae
- Subsection: P. subsect. Ponderosae
- Species: P. maximinoi

Binomial name
- Pinus maximinoi H.E.Moore

Synonyms
- Homotypic Synonyms: Pinus douglasiana var. maximinoi (H.E.Moore) Silba; Pinus pseudostrobus var. tenuifolia Shaw; Pinus tenuifolia Benth.; Heterotypic Synonyms: Pinus escandoniana Roezl; Pinus hoseriana Roezl; Pinus tzompoliana Roezl

= Pinus maximinoi =

Species of conifer

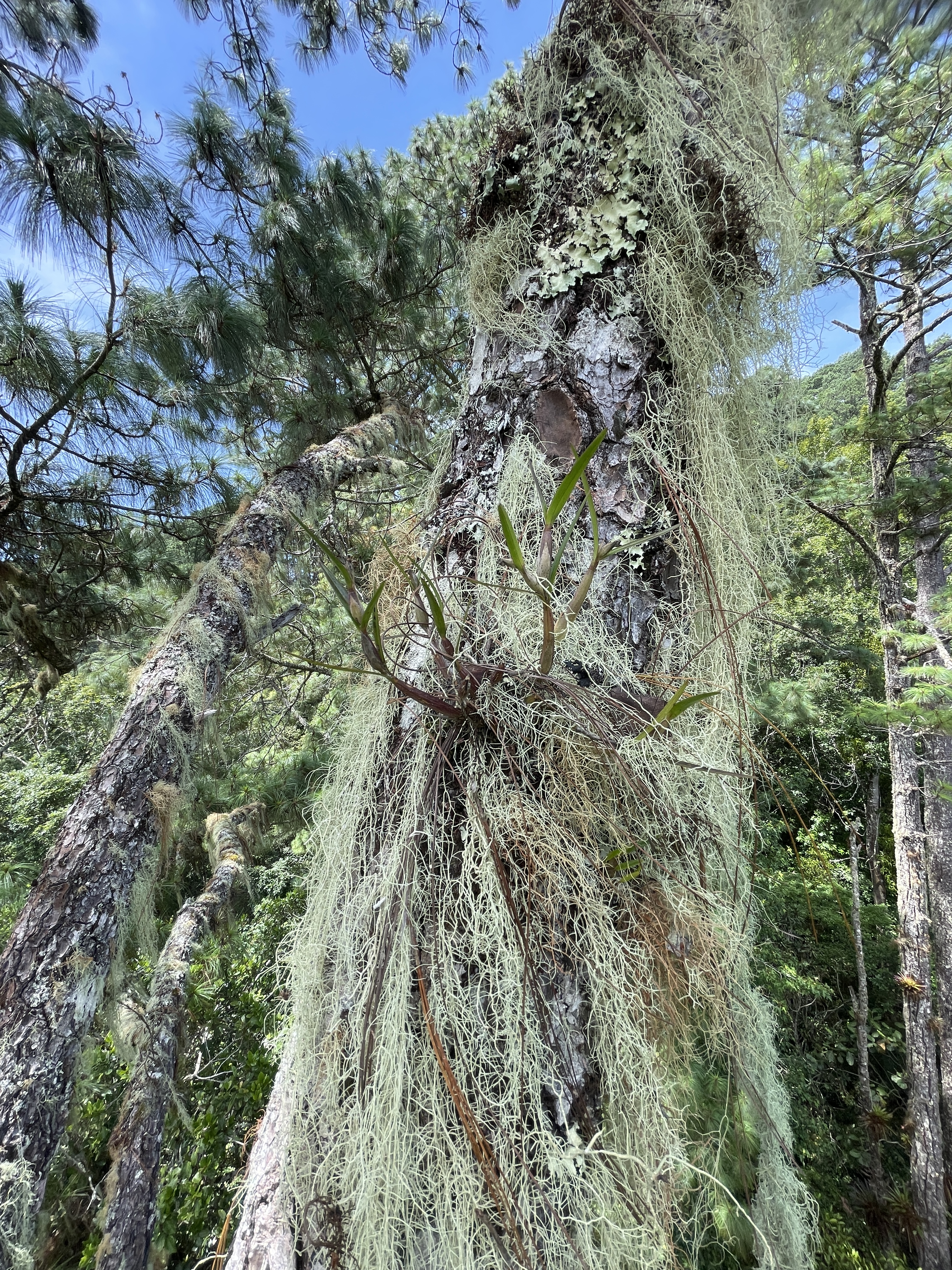
Epiphytic plants growing on the lateral branches

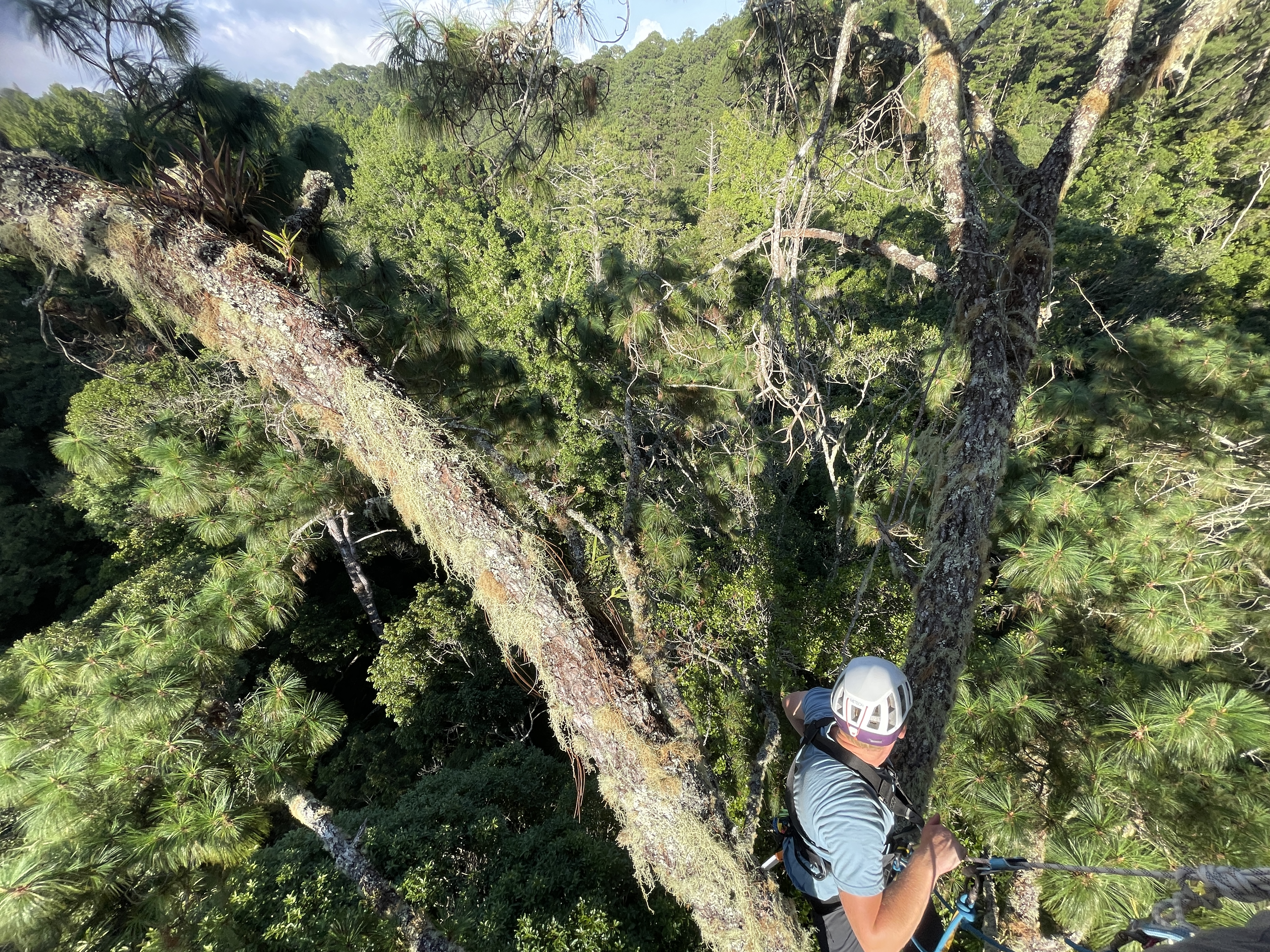
Climber at height above the lower canopy layer in Cusuco National Park, Honduras whilst on expedition with Operation Wallacea.

Pinus maximinoi is a species of conifer in the family Pinaceae. It is sometimes referred to by the common name thinleaf pine. It is native to El Salvador, Guatemala, Honduras, Mexico, and Nicaragua. It reaches a height of 15–30 meters (49–98 feet) and has smooth bark when young.

== Distribution and habitat ==
Pinus maximinoi grows in a range of habitats from wet subtropical forest, to drier pine or oak-pine forest or woodlands, as well as cooler, mountain cloud forests. It grows in an equally wide range of elevations from 450 to 2,800 meters.
