= Montaña de Comayagua National Park =

National park in Honduras

- IUCN category II (national park)
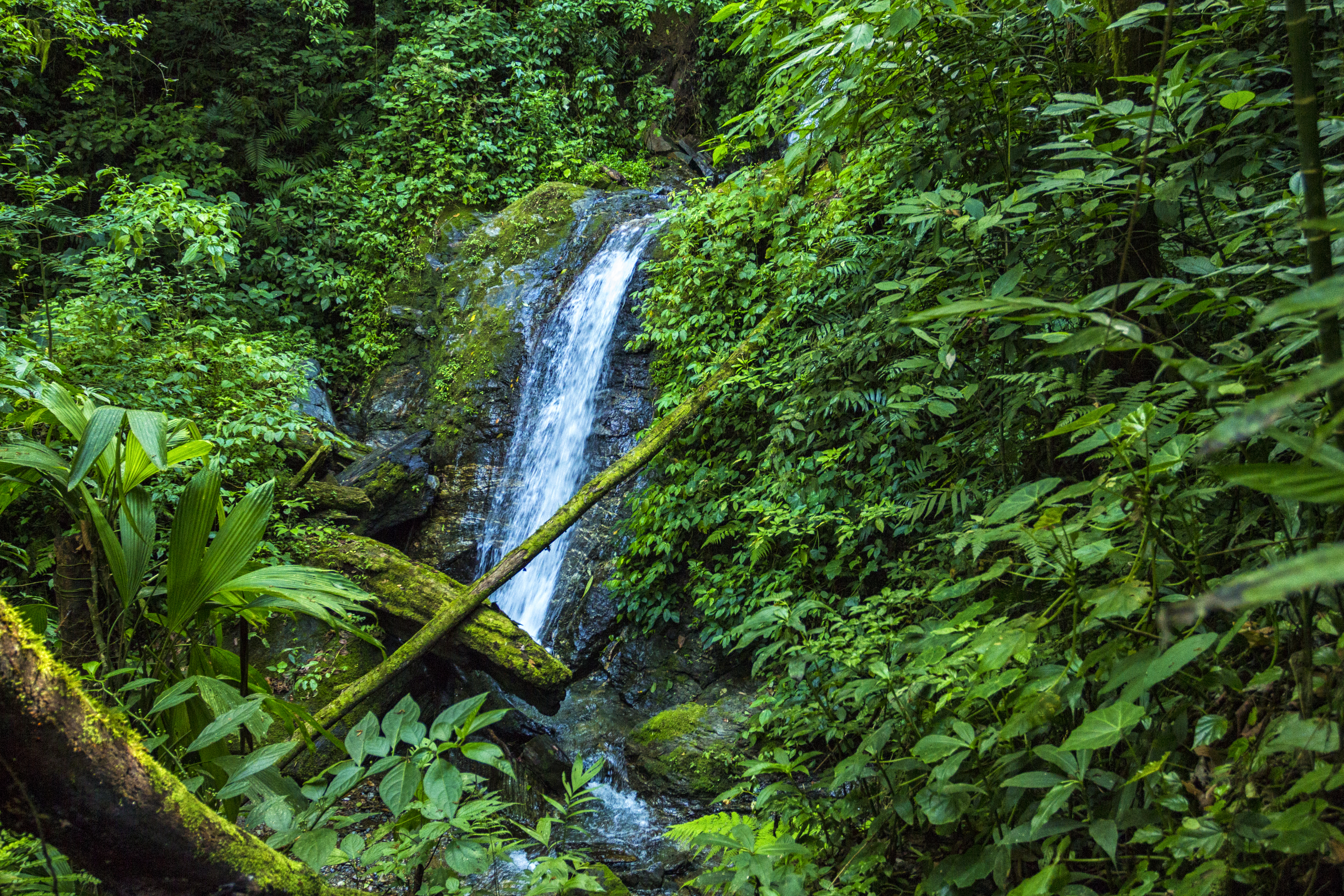
- Waterfall at Montaña de Comayagua National Park, May 2016

- Location within Honduras
- Location: Honduras
- Coordinates: 14°29′41″N 87°30′41″W
- Area: 184.8 km^{2} (71.4 sq mi)
- Established: 1 January 1987

Montaña de Comayagua National Park is a national park in Honduras. It was established on 1 January 1987 and covers an area of 184.8 square kilometres. The park is known locally by the name Parque Nacional Montaña de Comayagua and the acronym PANACOMA.

The park can be reached by heading north from Comayagua on the highway to La Libertad. At the town of San Jeróniomo turn right onto a dirt road. The turn off is marked by a sign. Follow the signs for Río Negro and PANACOMA. The road is mostly single lane with a few concrete bridges. A four-wheel-drive vehicle with good clearance is necessary to successfully transit the road. There is a park information centre in the Village of Río Negro at 14.542533°N 87.554117°W 14°32'33.12"N 87°33'14.82"W. Hiking guides can be hired at the information centre.

The park is home of many waterfalls. The Río Gavilán has a 50-metre-high (160 ft) waterfall called the Cascada de los Ensueños that is located at 14°32'57.65"N 87°32'36.17"W on a well constructed trail about an hour-long hike from the trailhead. The trailhead is located at 14°33'1.82"N 87°33'1.71"W along the road leading to Río Negro.
