= Chortis Highlands =

Region in northern Central America

The Chortis Highlands is a highland region in northern Central America, which covers portions of Guatemala, El Salvador, Honduras, and Nicaragua.

== Geography and geology ==
The Chortis Highlands is a large dissected plateau which extends across most of Honduras and El Salvador, along with a portion of western Guatemala and north-central Nicaragua. It is named for the Chʼortiʼ people, who inhabit the western portion of the Highlands.

Geologically the Highlands is part of the Chortis Block, a continental fragment that extends eastwards under the Atlantic coastal plain and continental shelf of Honduras and Nicaragua, and westwards under the Pacific coastal lowlands and Central American Volcanic Arc of Guatemala, El Salvador, and Nicaragua. The Chortis Block forms the northwestern portion of the Caribbean Plate.

The Chortis Block is bounded on the north by the Motagua-Polochic Fault Zone in Guatemala. The valley of the Motagua River, which follows the fault, forms the northwestern boundary of the Highlands.

The Highlands is composed of several mountain ranges, or cordilleras, separated by intermontane valleys and plains. These ranges include:

- Sierra Nombre de Dios
- Sierra de Omoa
- Sierra de Espíritu Santo
- Sierra de Joconal
- Montaña de Santa Bárbara
- Montañas de Meámbar
- Sierra de Montecillos
- Sierra de Comayagua
- Sierra de Sulaco
- Cordillera de La Flor-La Muralla
- Sierra de Agalta
- Sierra de Botaderos
- Sierra Punta Piedra
- Montañas de Patuca
- Montecristo Massif or Sierra de Montecristo
- Sierra del Merendón
- Sierra de Celaque
- Sierra de Erandique
- Sierra de Puca-Opalaca
- Montaña de la Sierra
- Sierra de Lepaterique
- Sierra de Dipilto
- Montaña de Colón
- Cordillera Dariense
- Cordillera Chontaleña

The northern, central, and eastern, and southern highlands are drained by rivers that empty into the Caribbean. These include the Motagua in Guatemala, the Ulúa, Aguán, and Patuca rivers in Honduras, the Coco which forms the Honduras-Nicaragua border, and the Wawa, Kukalaya, Prinzapolka, Río Grande de Matagalpa, and San Juan in Nicaragua.

The western portion of the highlands is drained by rivers that empty into the Pacific, including the Lempa in El Salvador, the Choluteca in Honduras, and the Negro in Nicaragua.

== Climate ==
The climate of the highlands is tropical. Prevailing winds are generally from the east, and the eastern Caribbean-facing slopes and high mountains generally receive more rainfall than the western slopes and Pacific lowlands, which are in the rain shadow of the highlands.

== Flora and fauna ==
The cooler and wetter climate of the mountains and plateaus supports pine–oak forests, and humid cloud forests at higher elevations. The warmer intermontane valleys are covered in seasonally-dry forests.
