= Chiapas Highlands =

Region in Chiapas, Mexico

- Central Highlands of Chiapas; Chiapas Plateau
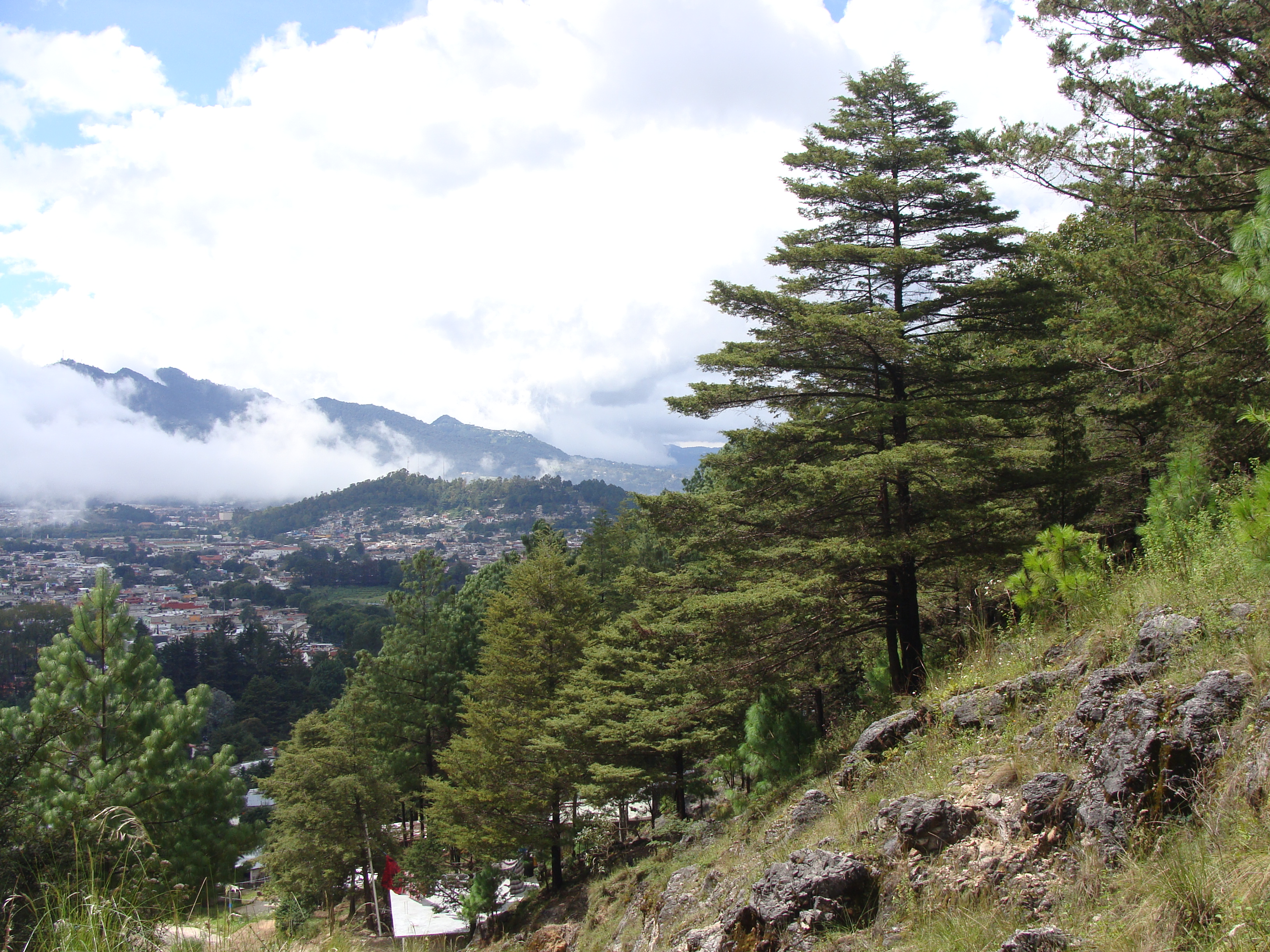
- Chiapas Highlands above San Cristóbal de las Casas

Highest point
- Coordinates: 16.7167°N 92.6167°W

Naming
- Native name: Los Altos de Chiapas (Spanish)

Geography
- Location within Mexico

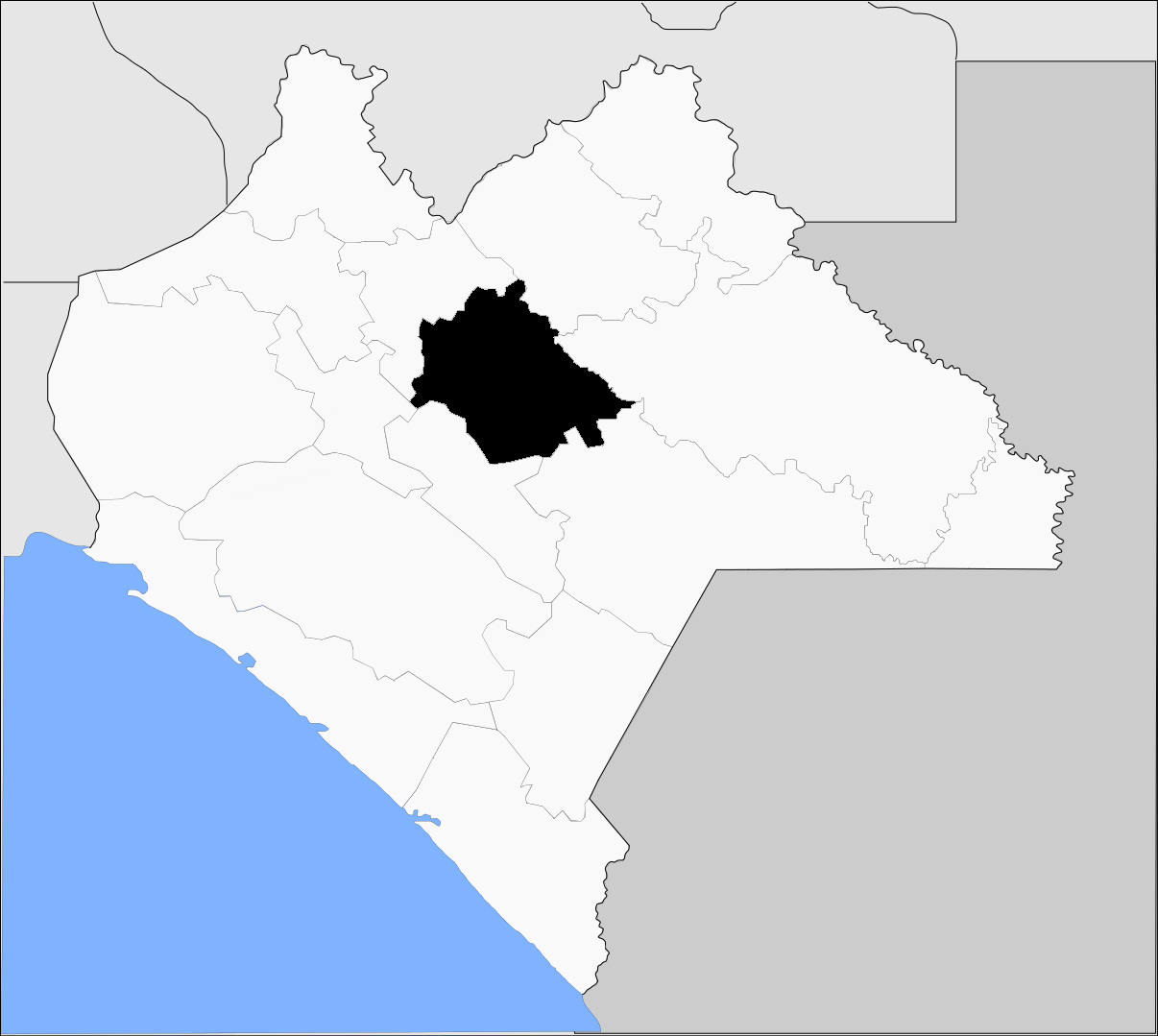
- Location in Chiapas
- Country: Mexico
- State: Chiapas

The Chiapas Highlands, also known as the Central Highlands of Chiapas or Chiapas Plateau (Spanish: Los Altos de Chiapas), is a geographic, sociocultural and administrative region located in Chiapas, the southernmost state of Mexico.

== Geography ==
The Chiapas Highlands are in the central part of the state of Chiapas. They are part of the Central American highlands, which run from the Isthmus of Tehuantepec in Mexico to central Nicaragua. The Chiapas Highlands comprise a limestone mass with extrusive volcanic rocks at the highest peaks, covering over 11,000 km^{2}. They extend 160 km along a northwest–southeast axis, and 70 km at the widest. The elevation varies from 300 to 2,898 meters above the sea level.

The northern and eastern slopes of the Central Highlands are drained by the Usumacinta River, which empties northwards into the Gulf of Mexico. The Chiapas Depression lies south of the Central Highlands. The Chiapas Depression and southern slopes of the Chiapas Highlands are drained by the Grijalva River, which also empties northwards into the Gulf of Mexico. The limestone of the plateau is easily eroded by water, creating a karst landscape with many sinkholes, sinkhole lakes, caverns, and underground drainage.

The Chiapas Depression separates the Central Highlands from the Sierra Madre de Chiapas, which runs east and west through the southern part of Chiapas and extending west into Oaxaca and eastwards into Guatemala and El Salvador. The Sierra Madre de Chiapas forms the divide between the basins of the Grijalva and Usumacinta rivers and those that drain southwards into the Pacific Ocean.

San Cristóbal de las Casas is the largest city in the highlands. Other towns include Comitán and Ocosingo.

== Climate ==
San Cristóbal de las Casas, a city in the Chiapas highlands has a mild subtropical highland climate (Köppen climate classification Cwb) moderated by its altitude. The dry season, which runs from November to April is cool with a January average of 12.3 °C (54.1 °F). Owing to its altitude and the relative aridity of the dry season, San Cristóbal de las Casas has a fairly high diurnal temperature range and nighttime temperatures are cool. Extended periods of frosts are rare, occurring only 2–3 days per year in December to February. Humidity is high (around 78%), even during the winter months, and fog or mist is quite common during the winter months, occurring 13–17 days per month with fog. Usually, this clears off during the day. The wet season, which runs from May to October is warmer, with a June average of 17.0 °C (62.6 °F) and precipitation is significantly higher during these months. Fog is less common during this time. Average annual precipitation is 1,084.7 millimetres (42.7 in) most of it concentrated in the wet season. The wettest month recorded was September 1998 when 525.8 millimetres (20.7 in) of precipitation was recorded, and the wettest day recorded was on October 4, 2005 with105 millimetres (4.1 in). Extremes range from a low of −8.5 °C (16.7 °F) to 35.8 °C (96.4 °F).

== Flora and fauna ==
The higher elevations are covered by pine forests, with Mexican yellow pine (Pinus oocarpa) and smooth-bark Mexican pine (Pinus pseudostrobus). Pine–oak forests include Mexican yellow pine and smooth-bark Mexican pine with Quercus peduncularis and other species of oaks.

montane cloud forests are found on the windward north- and east-facing slopes with high year-round rainfall. Predominant trees include oaks, majagua (Trichospermum mexicanum), American sweetgum (Liquidambar styraciflua) and alder (Alnus sp.).

Lower-elevation forests include areas of tropical evergreen forest, with big-leaf mahogany (Swietenia macrophylla), Spanish cedar (Cedrela odorata) and Santa Maria hardwood (Calophyllum brasiliense), and dry forests in the southwest, which lies in the mountains' drier rain shadow.

== Municipalities ==
The Chiapaneca regional government recognizes the highlands as a socioeconomic region called "altos Tsotsil-Tsetsal" that is formed by 17 municipalities. Culturally, the region is subdivided in Tsotsil and Tsetsal. Spanish is the main language spoken in San Cristobal, however in all of the rural municipalities the main language spoken is either Tsotsil or Tsetsal. In fact, Tsotsil is the lingua franca in the region and is spoken amongst many indigenous of other denominations and some Latinos.

== Economy ==
The seasonal pattern of rain is ideal for the cultivation of maize and beans which are the staple food for most local indigenous people. However, at high elevations in Tierra Fria production only reaches subsistence levels. On the flanks of the highlands between an altitude of 4,000 and 5,500 ft coffee can be produced. Coffee constitutes a major crop and unlike beans and maize it is sold for cash. Other cash crops are also produced within the region such as cabbage in Chamula or Mandarins in Tenejapa, but their importance is null compared with coffee. Cattle and sheep are other commercial enterprises.

Producers (usually indigenous) also face hardships when trying to commercialize their produce, as described by Brown it is a usual practice for intermediaries also known as coyotes (usually ladinos) to charge producers a high fee to transport their harvest from their community to the cabezera municipal (head of county) or San Cristobal to be sold. In that same way, products sold directly in the communities tend to be more expensive than when sold in San Cristobal. As a result, some indigenous coffee producing communities have self organize in to coffee cooperatives offering an alternative to independent indigenous producers to commercialize their product.

=== Marginalization ===
Economic activity in Los Altos is constrained by a high degree of marginalization. The region's total population is 601,190 distributed in 1,182 villages of which only two have more than 15,000 inhabitants. The vast majority of people live in communities with less than 2,500 inhabitants. In fact there are more than 900 communities with less than 500 inhabitants. The largest population center is San Cristobal de las Casas with 158,000 inhabitants. This city is the regional economic and political center of the region. San Cristobal or 'Jovel' (in Tsotsil) was founded in 1528 as "Ciudad Real" by Spanish conquerors as the capital of the province and the headquarters of Hispanic control in the highlands. In colonial times the Chiapanecan region was a marginal territory due to its lack of precious metals and its long distance to the main commerce routes or the sea making it an unattractive region for Spanish conquers to settle in. In Los Altos the social order was composed of extreme castes, the majority of the inhabitants were impoverished Indians while few Spanish concentrated the social and economic power.

Ethnic segregation was and still is at the core of the economic system. Since colonial times and until recently Los Altos indigenous population has provided a steady flow of labor to other regions and to the non indigenous living within the region. San Cristobal was described as a "parasitic city that used its political, administrative, and religious powers to strip the Indians of the fruits of their labors." The city was key in establishing an exploitation system in the region. At the center of the exploitation system there are long term ethnic divisions where mestizos (person of Hispanic culture from outside of Los Altos), ladinos (Person of Hispanic culture from within Los Altos historically San Cristobal) and indigenas (people from indigenous descent most of them are Tsotsiles or Tsetsales) have a place. Brown, (1993) talks extensively about the inequalities that the system has created for indigenous peoples and how despite the efforts of the Mexican government those inequalities still persist.

== Government intervention ==
Starting in the 1940s the Instituto Nacional Indigenista (INI) run a program aimed at "integrating" the indigenous people to the modern world. The public policy was known as indigenismo. Acculturation took place through the training of promotores -indigenous instructors- that taught Spanish, hygiene and cultural norms to indigenous communities. Another important component of the program was to introduce much needed infrastructure like roads, schools health clinics and commerce to the communities since as pointed out by Lewis, during the 1950s modern infrastructure was virtually non existent outside of San Cristobal. Despite many difficulties and the use of controversial approaches, the program created a rudimentary highway system in which some of the communities are connected by all weather roads while most have access through dirt roads that are unusable during the rainy season or no road at all. As a consequence bringing products to the communities can be a difficult task.

== See also ==
- Central America Volcanic Arc
