= Transboundary protected area =

Conservation region spanning the boundaries of multiple states

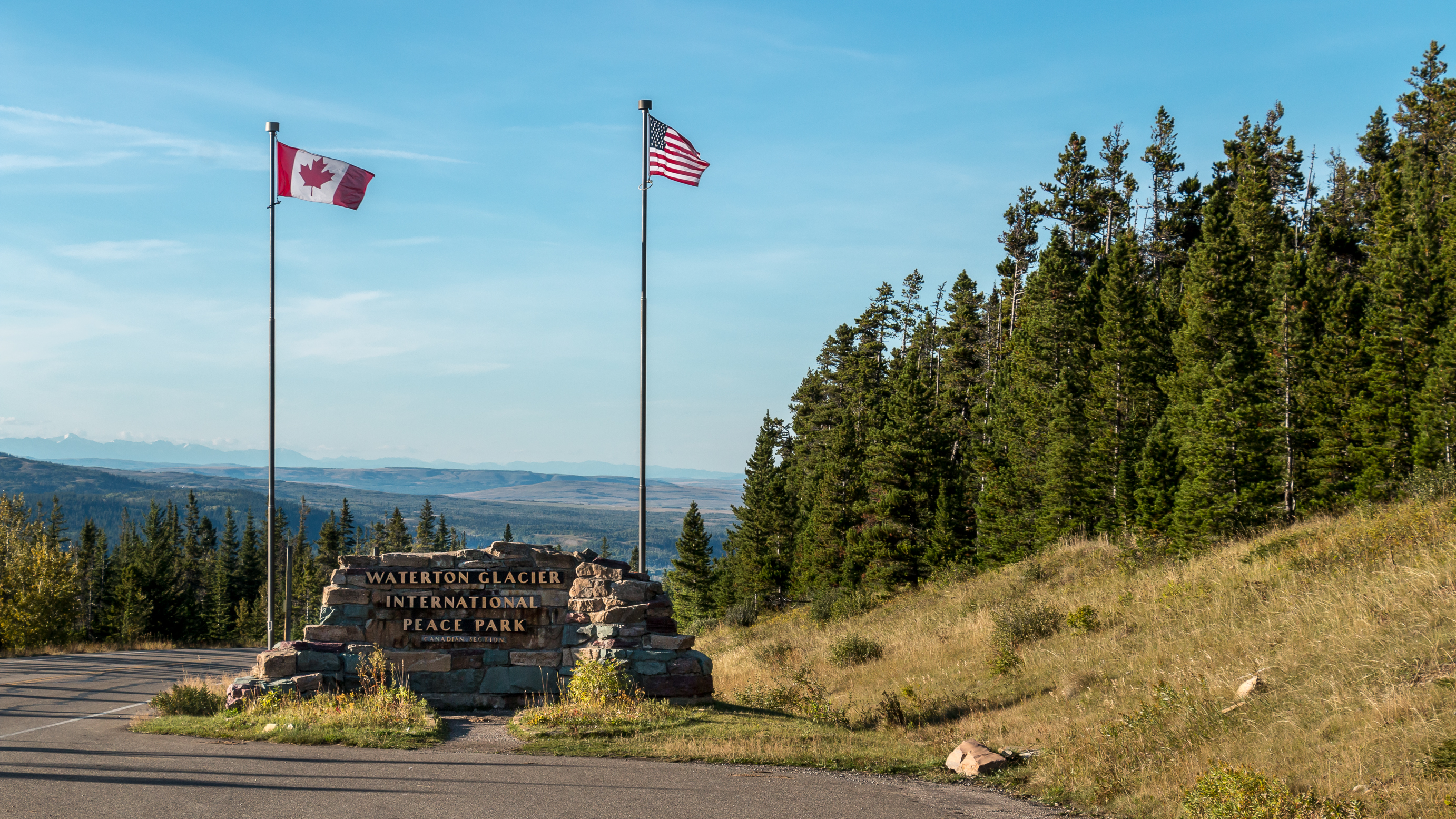
Flags of Canada and the United States in Waterton-Glacier International Peace Park

A transboundary protected area (TBPA) is an ecological protected area that spans boundaries of more than one country or sub-national entity. Such areas are also known as transfrontier conservation areas (TFCAs) or peace parks.

TBPAs exist in many forms around the world, and are established for various reasons. The preservation of traditional animal migration patterns, ensuring sufficient food and water sources for population growth, is a critical reason for the creation of TBPAs. However, TBPAs also encourage tourism, economic development and goodwill between neighbouring countries, as well as making it easier for indigenous inhabitants of the area to travel.

== Types of transboundary protected areas ==
TBPAs exist in various types of geographic configuration, with various levels of ecological protection, and with various levels of international cooperation. Additionally, different organizations employ different definitions for TBPAs. Julia Marton-Lefevre broadly defines TBPAs as "areas that involve a degree of cooperation across one or more boundaries between (or within) countries." The Southern Africa Development Community's Protocol on Wildlife Conservation and Law Enforcement defines Transfrontier Conservation Area as "the area or the component of a large ecological region that straddles the boundaries of two or more countries, encompassing one or more protected areas, as well as multiple resources use areas." The Global Transboundary Protected Areas Network (GTPAN) lists four types of "transboundary conservation areas:"

- Type 1: transboundary protected area;
- Type 2: transboundary conservation landscape and/or seascape;
- Type 3: transboundary conservation migration area; and
- Special designation: park for peace.

GTPAN defines a transboundary protected area as "a clearly defined geographical space that includes protected areas that are ecologically connected across one or more international boundaries and involves some form of cooperation." GTPAN defines a transboundary conservation landscape and/or seascape as "an ecologically connected area that includes both protected areas and multiple resource use areas across one or more international boundaries and involves some form of cooperation."

GTPAN defines a transboundary conservation migration area as "wildlife habitats in two or more countries that are necessary to sustain populations of migratory species and involve some form of cooperation."

GTPAN defines a "park for peace" as "any of the three types of transboundary conservation areas [that is] dedicated to the promotion, celebration and/or commemoration of peace and cooperation."

In many instances, individual TBPAs are part of broader international environmental or cultural programs. TBPAs can be World Heritage Sites, Ramsar Wetlands, and/or UNESCO Biosphere Reserves.

== History of transboundary protected areas ==
In 1932, the governments of Canada and the United States passed legislation creating the first international peace park: Waterton-Glacier International Peace Park. This action followed from a joint resolution of the Rotary Clubs of Montana and Alberta calling for the creation of the peace park.

On 1 February 1997, Anton Rupert, together with Prince Bernhard of the Netherlands and Nelson Mandela, founded the Peace Parks Foundation as a nonprofit organisation to facilitate the establishment of transfrontier conservation areas (TFCAs).

A 2001 study by the World Conservation Union found "there were 166 existing transboundary protected area complexes worldwide comprising 666 individual conservation zones."

In 2007, the Global Transboundary Conservation Network published a global inventory of transboundary protected areas identifying 227 transboundary protected areas.

== Established transboundary protected areas ==
=== Africa ===
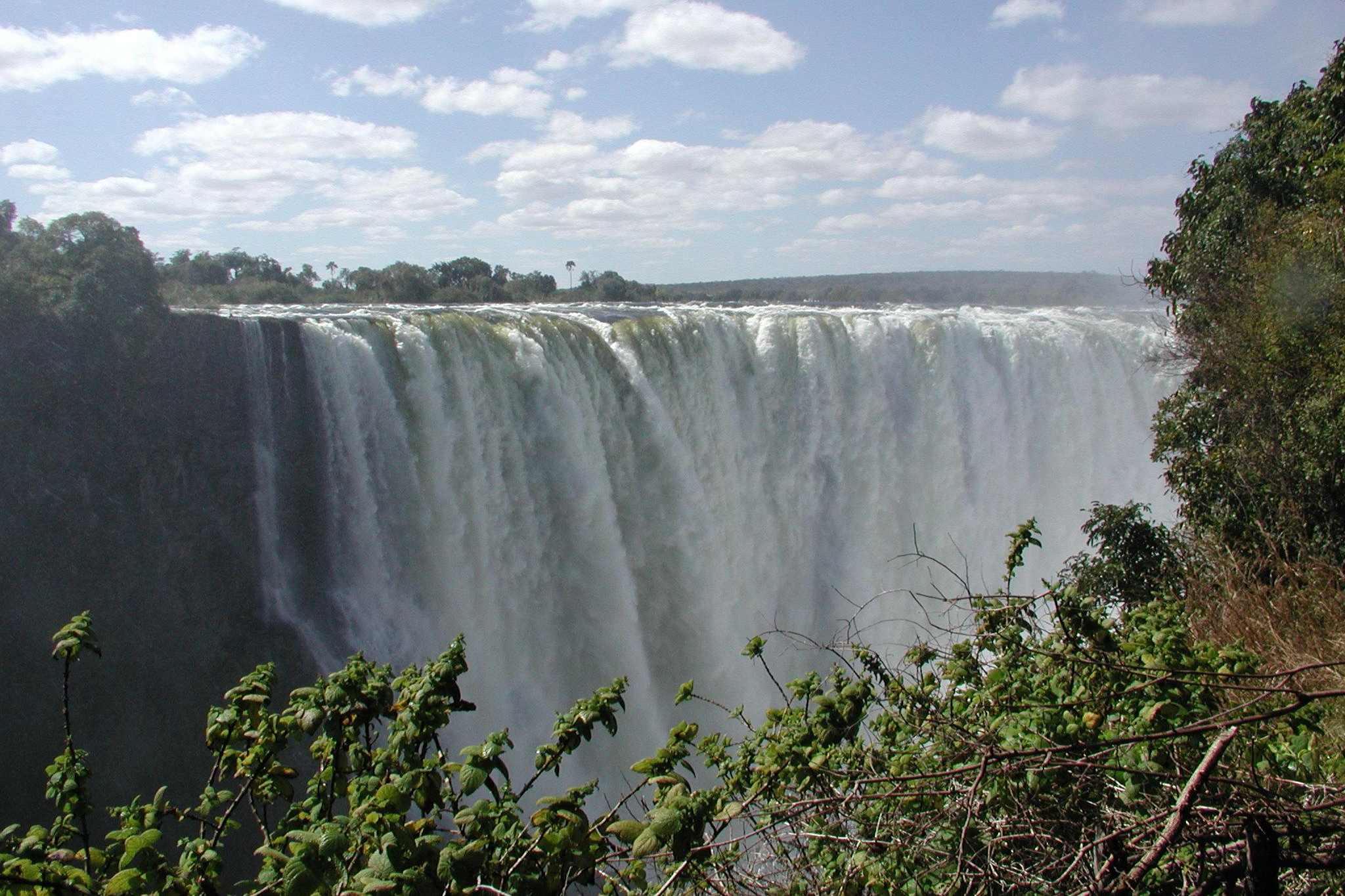
Victoria Falls--National Parks in Zambia and Zimbabwe form a TBPA.

==== Transboundary World Heritage Sites ====
- Maloti-Drakensberg Park is a World Heritage Site on the border of Lesotho and South Africa. Sehlabathebe National Park in Lesotho and uKahlamba Drakensberg Park form the core of the site.
- Mosi-oa-Tunya/Victoria Falls is a World Heritage Site on the border of Zambia and Zimbabwe.
- Mount Nimba Strict Nature Reserve is a World Heritage Site on the border of Côte d'Ivoire and Guinea.
- Sangha Trinational is a World Heritage Site on the borders of Cameroon, the Central African Republic, and the Republic of Congo. Lobeke National Park, Dzanga-Ndoki National Park, and Nouabale-Ndoki National Park in the respective nations comprise the core of the site, with additional forested buffer zones extending beyond the parks. A Trinational Monitoring and Action Committee provides ministerial level coordination between the nations.
- Virunga Volcanoes Transboundary Conservation Area is a UNESCO World Heritage complex on the border of Democratic Republic of Congo, Rwanda and Uganda. It is partially composed of Democratic Republic of Congo's Virunga National Park, Uganda's Rwenzori Mountains National Park and Queen Elizabeth National Park, and Rwanda's Volcanoes National Park.
- W-Arly-Pendjari is a World Heritage Site on the borders of Niger, Burkina Faso, and Benin. The site is also designated as a Ramsar wetland and a UNESCO biosphere reserve.

==== Transboundary Ramsar Wetlands ====
- Complexe Kokorou-Namga is a transfrontier Ramsar wetland between Burkina Faso and Mali.
- Complexe Transfrontalier Lac Tele-Grands Affluents-Lac Tumba is a transboundary Ramsar wetland on the border of Congo and the Democratic Republic of Congo.
- Niumi-Saloum is a transboundary Ramsar wetland on the border of Gambia and Senegal. It is composed of Niumi National Park in Gambia and Delta du Saloum National Park in Senegal.
- A transboundary Ramsar wetlands complex covers Lake Chad, composed of sites in Niger, Chad, Nigeria, and Cameroon.
- Zone Humide du Moyen is a transfrontier Ramsar wetland on the border of Benin and Nigeria.

==== Transboundary Biosphere Reserves ====
- Delta du Fleuve Senegal is a transboundary UNESCO biosphere reserve crossing the border of Mauritania and Senegal.
- Mono is a transboundary UNESCO biosphere reserve crossing the border of Benin and Togo.

==== Transboundary Conservation Complexes ====
- ǀAi-ǀAis/Richtersveld Transfrontier Park is a transboundary conservation complex on the border of Namibia and South Africa.
- Chimanimani Transfrontier Park is a transboundary conservation area on the border of Mozambique and Zimbabwe, made up of Mozambique's Chimanimani National Reserve and Zimbabwe's Chimanimani National Park.
- Great Limpopo Transfrontier Park is a transboundary conservation complex on the border of Mozambique, South Africa and Zimbabwe. It is partially composed of Mozambique's Limpopo National Park, South Africa's Kruger National Park and Zimbabwe's Gonarezhou National Park and Sengwe Corridor.
- Greater Mapungubwe is a transboundary conservation complex on the border of Botswana, South Africa and Zimbabwe.
- Kavango Zambezi is a transboundary conservation complex on the borders of Angola, Botswana, Namibia, Zambia and Zimbabwe. It is the world's largest TBPA and encompasses the Mosi-oa-Tunya World Heritage site listed above.
- Kgalagadi Transfrontier Park is a transboundary conservation complex on the border of Botswana and South Africa.
- Kidepo is a transboundary conservation complex on the border of South Sudan and Uganda. It is composed of South Sudan's Kidepo Game Reserve and Uganda's Kidepo Valley National Park.
- Kilimanjaro is a transboundary conservation complex centered around Mount Kilimanjaro and on the border of Kenya and Tanzania. It is composed of Tanzania's Kilimanjaro National Park, a UNESCO World Heritage site, and Kenya's Amboseli National Park.
- Lower Zambezi - Mana Pools is a transboundary conservation complex on the border of Zambia and Zimbabwe.
- Lubombo Transfrontier Conservation Area is a transboundary conservation complex on the border of Mozambique, South Africa and Eswatini.
- Malawi-Zambia TFCA is a transboundary conservation complex on the border of Malawi and Zambia. It crosses the border at multiple locations.
- Niokolo Koba-Badiar is a transboundary conservation complex on the border of Guinea and Senegal.
- Serengeti-Masai is a transboundary conservation complex on the border of Kenya and Tanzania.
- A transboundary conservation complex crosses the border of Burkina Faso and Côte d'Ivoire. It is composed partially of a Ramsar wetland in Burkina Faso and the National Park of Comoe in Côte d'Ivoire.
- The Global Transboundary Conservation Network's 2007 inventory lists additional TBPAs on the borders of:
  1. Liberia and Sierra Leone;
  2. Guinea and Liberia;
  3. Côte d'Ivoire and Liberia;
  4. Côte d'Ivoire and Ghana at three locations;
  5. Cameroon and Nigeria at two locations;
  6. Cameroon and Equatorial Guinea;
  7. Central African Republic and Sudan;
  8. Congo and Gabon;
  9. Democratic Republic of the Congo and what is now South Sudan;
  10. What is now South Sudan and Uganda;
  11. Kenya and Uganda;
  12. Kenya and Somalia;
  13. Burundi and Rwanda;
  14. Rwanda and Tanzania;
  15. Tanzania and Uganda;
  16. Tanzania and Zambia;
  17. Mozambique and Tanzania; and
  18. Angola and Namibia.

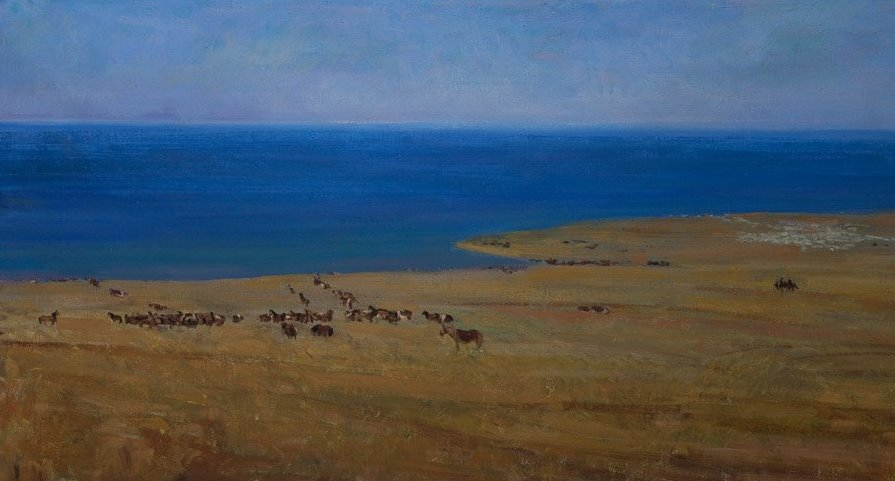
Uvs Nuur Basin is a TBPA in Mongolia and Russia.

=== Asia ===
- Govater Bay and Hur-e-Bahu - Jiwani Coastal Wetland is a transboundary Ramsar complex on the border of Iran and Pakistan.
- Hamun-e-Puzak, south end - Hamun-e-Saberi & Hamun-e-Helmand is a transboundary Ramsar complex on the border of Afghanistan and Iran.
- Landscapes of Dauria is a World Heritage Site on the border of Mongolia and Russia on the Daurian Steppe. It is composed of Dornod Mongol Biosphere Reserve in Mongolia and Daursky Nature Reserve in Russia.
- Labi Hills/Gunung Pulu Transboundary Complex is a transboundary conservation complex on the border of Brunei and Malaysia.
- The Lanjak Entimau/Batang/Ai/Betung Kerihun Complex is a transboundary conservation complex on the border of Indonesia and Malaysia. The countries have two additional TBPAs on their border.
- Taxkorgan is a transboundary protected area on the border of Afghanistan, China, and Pakistan. Afghanistan's Wahan National Park, China's Taxkorgan Nature Reserve, and Pakistan's Khunjerab National Park form the site.
- The Turtle Islands Heritage Protected Area is a marine protected area consisting of the Turtle Islands Wildlife Sanctuary (Philippines), and the Turtle Islands National Park (Malaysia).
- Uvs Nuur Basin is a World Heritage Site on the border of Mongolia and Russia covering Uvs Nuur Lake and protecting its wetlands. Mongolia and Russia have two more bilateral TBPAs on their border.
- Wasur-Tonda Transboundary Conservation Area is a transboundary conservation complex on the border of Indonesia and Papua New Guinea.
- The Global Transboundary Conservation Network's 2007 inventory lists an additional 49 TBPAs in Asian nations.
- The Heart of Borneo is a transboundary protected area on the island of Borneo which includes the nations of Brunei, Malaysia, and Indonesia.

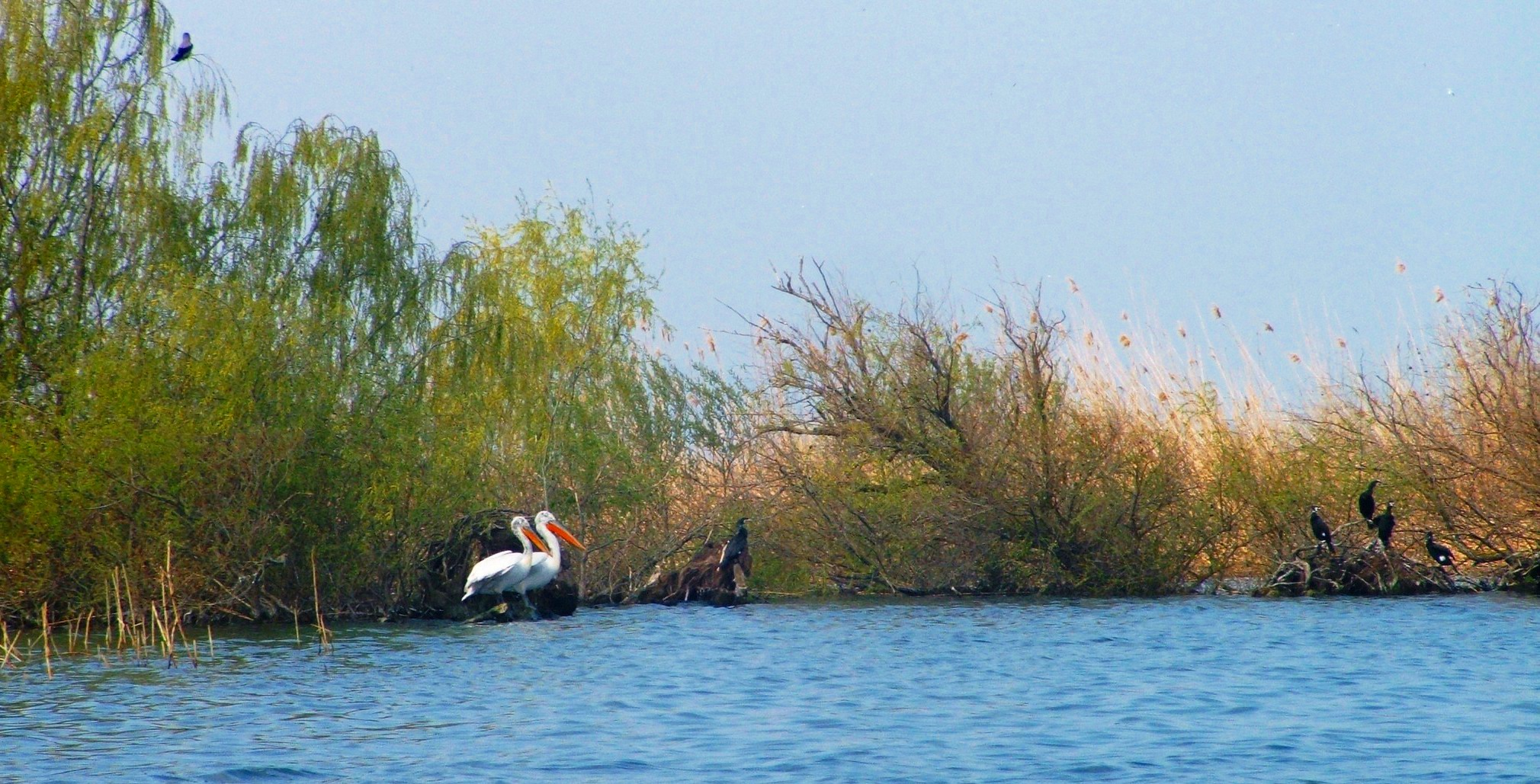
The Danube Delta is a TBPA and home to pelicans and cormorants.

=== Europe ===
==== Transboundary World Heritage Sites ====
- Bialowieza Forest is a World Heritage Site on the border of Belarus and Poland.
- Caves of Aggtelek Karst and Slovak Karst is a World Heritage Site on the border of Slovakia and Hungary. It is formed by Aggtelek National Park in Hungary and Slovak Karst National Park in Slovakia. The site protects 712 karstic caves for ecology, paleontology and tourism.
- Curonian Spit is a World Heritage Site on the border of Lithuania and Russia. Lithuania's Curonian Spit National Park and Russia's Kurshskaya National Park form the site.
- Monte San Giorgio is a World Heritage Site on the border of Italy and Switzerland.
- Muskauer Park/Park Muzakowski is a World Heritage Site on the border of Germany and Poland. The site preserves a historically significant landscape park originally created in the 19th century.
- Pyrenees-Mont Perdu is a World Heritage Site on the border of France and Spain. France's Pyrenees National Park and Spain's Parque Nacional de Ordesa y Monte Perdido form the core of the site.
- Rhaetian Railway in the Albula/Bernina Landscapes is a World Heritage Site in Italy and Switzerland.
- Wadden Sea is a World Heritage Site running through the maritime territories of Denmark, Germany and the Netherlands. It is composed of multiple national parks across the participating nations, covering the world's largest contiguous system of mudflats and intertidal sand. The Trilateral Cooperation on the Protection of the Wadden Sea coordinates the site's conservation. Wadden Sea is also designated as a transboundary Ramsar wetland.

==== Transboundary Ramsar Wetlands ====
- Adutiškis-Vileity is a transboundary Ramsar wetland on the border of Belarus and Lithuania.
- Austrian-Bavarian Wildalm is a transboundary Ramsar wetland on the border of Austria and Germany.
- Baradla Cave System and Domica Ramsar Sites are cooperatively managed transboundary wetlands on the border of Hungary and Slovakia. This was the first declaration of a transboundary wetland under the Ramsar Convention.
- Bistret-Ibisha Island is a transboundary Ramsar wetland on the border of Bulgaria and Romania. It is composed of Ibisha Island in Bulgaria and Bistret in Romania.
- Gornje Podunavije - Gemenc - Kopacki Rit is a transboundary Ramsar complex on the border of Croatia, Hungary and Serbia.
- Ipoly Valley and Poiplie are transboundary Ramsar wetlands on the border of Hungary and Slovakia.
- Kotra and Čepkelai are transboundary Ramsar wetlands on the border of Belarus and Lithuania.
- Krkonose/Karkonosze subalpine peatbogs is a transboundary Ramsar wetland on the border of the Czech Republic and Poland. The site is also a transboundary UNESCO biosphere reserve.
- Lake Calarasi-Srebarna is a transboundary Ramsar wetland on the border of Bulgaria and Romania. Srebarna Nature Reserve is the Bulgarian component of this complex and is a UNESCO World Heritage Site.
- Mannavuoma - Lätäseno-Hietajoki Mire is a transboundary Ramsar complex on the border of Finland and Sweden.
- North Livonian Transboundary Ramsar Site is a transboundary Ramsar wetland on the border of Estonia and Latvia. It is composed of Nigula Nature Reserve and Sookuninga Nature Reserve in Estonia and Northern Bogs in Latvia.
- Olmany-Perebrody mires is a transboundary Ramsar wetland on the border of Belarus and Ukraine.
- Prespa Basin is a cooperatively managed Ramsar wetland on the border of Albania, Greece and Macedonia.
- Rhin supérieur/Oberrhein—Oberrhein/Rhin supérieur is a transboundary Ramsar wetland on the border of France and Germany. It is composed of Rhin superieur/Oberrhein in France and Oberrhein/Rhin superieur in Germany.
- Stokhid-Prypiat-Prostyr is a transboundary Ramsar wetland on the border of Belarus and Ukraine. It is composed of the Prostyr site in Belarus and the Prypiat River Floodplains and Stokhid River Floodplains in Ukraine.
- Storkölen-Kvisleflået is a transboundary Ramsar complex on the border of Sweden and Norway.
- Suhaia-Belene Islands Complex is a transboundary Ramsar site on the border of Bulgaria and Romania. It is composed of Belene Islands Complex in Bulgaria and Suhaia in Romania.
- Trilateral Ramsar Site Floodplains of the Morava-Dyje-Danube Confluence is a transboundary Ramsar wetland on the border Austria, the Czech Republic, and Slovakia.
- Transboundary Ramsar Site Neusiedler See-Seewinkel-Ferto-Hansag is a transboundary Ramsar wetland on the border of Austria and Hungary.
- Upper Tisza Valley is a transboundary Ramsar wetland on the border of Hungary and Slovakia. It is composed of the Feslo-Tisza site in Hungary and the Tisa River site in Slovakia.
- Vallée de la Haute-Sure is a transboundary Ramsar wetland on the border of Belgium and Luxembourg, composed of sites of the same name in both countries.

==== Transboundary Biosphere Reserves ====
Of the world's twenty transboundary UNESCO biosphere reserves, twelve are in Europe. Spain, Portugal, Poland, and Ukraine each contribute to three reserves.

- Danube Delta is a transboundary UNESCO biosphere reserve crossing the border of Romania and Ukraine.
- East Carpathians is a transboundary UNESCO biosphere reserve crossing the border of Poland, Slovakia, and Ukraine.
- Geres - Xures is a transboundary UNESCO biosphere reserve crossing the border of Portugal and Spain.
- Meseta Iberica is a transboundary UNESCO biosphere reserve crossing the border of Portugal and Spain.
- Mont Viso / Area della Biosfera del Monviso is a transboundary UNESCO biosphere reserve crossing the border of France and Italy.
- Mura Drava Danube is a transboundary UNESCO biosphere reserve crossing the border of Croatia and Hungary.
- Tatra is a transboundary UNESCO biosphere reserve crossing the border of Slovakia and Poland.
- Tejo/Tajo Internacional is a transboundary UNESCO biosphere reserve crossing the border of Portugal and Spain.
- Vosges du Nord / Pfalzerwald is a transboundary UNESCO biosphere reserve crossing the border of France and Germany.
- West Polesie is a transboundary UNESCO biosphere reserve crossing the borders of Belarus, Poland, and Ukraine.

==== Transboundary Conservation Complexes ====
- The European Green Belt running along the former Iron Curtain is considered a peace park.
- A peace park has been established in the Red Sea between Israel and Jordan.
- Interprovincial Park of Montoni (Livorno/Grosseto, Italy)

=== North America ===
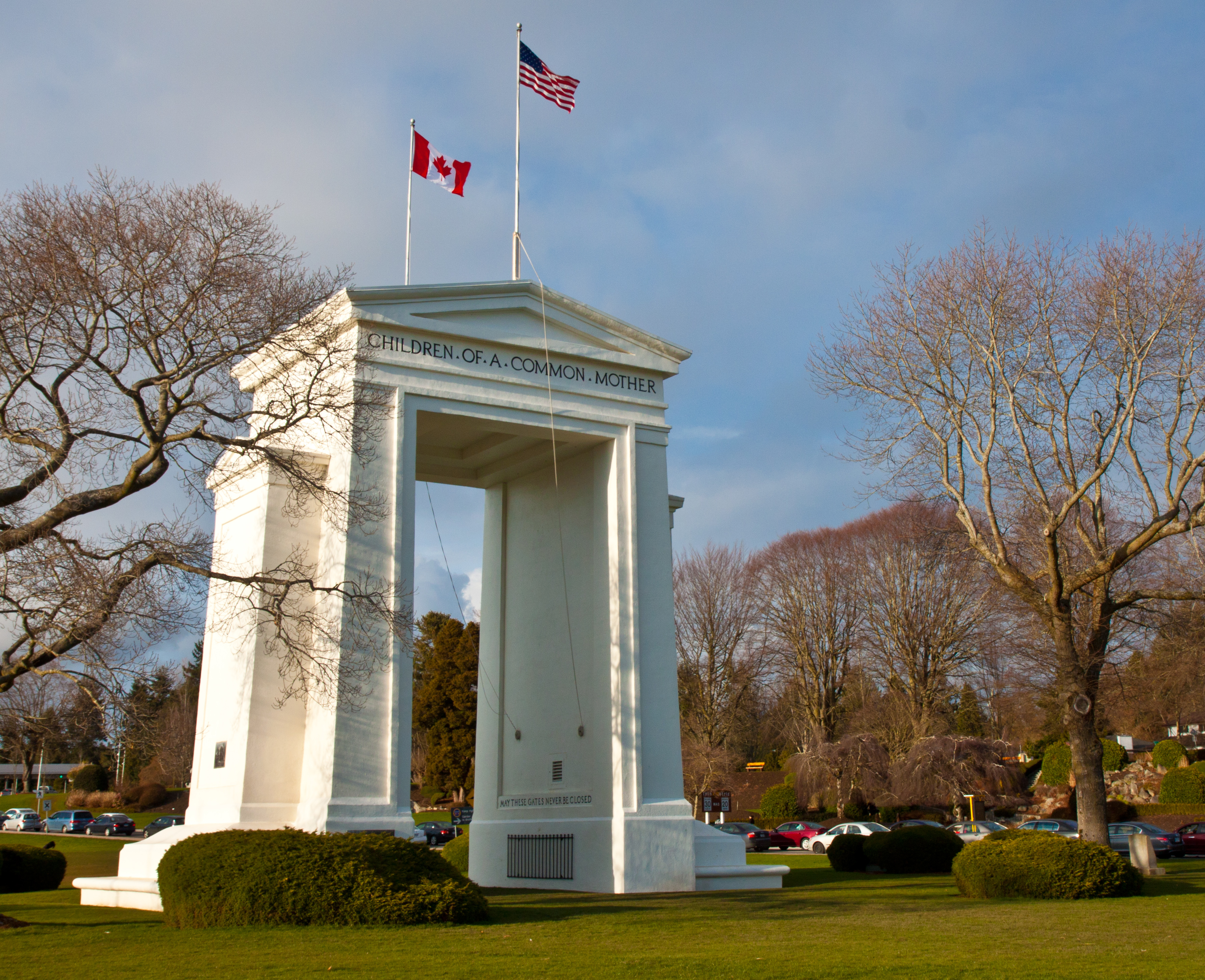
Flags of Canada and the United States fly on the Peace Arch in Peace Arch Park.

==== Canada and the United States ====
- Kluane/Wrangell-St. Elias/Glacier Bay/Tatshenshini-Alsek is a World Heritage Site on the border of Canada and the United States. It is composed of Kluane National Park and Reserve in the Yukon Territory, Wrangell-St.Elias National Park and Glacier Bay National Park in Alaska, and Tatshenshini-Alsek Provincial Park in British Columbia. The site includes the world's largest non-polar ice field.
- Klondike Gold Rush International Historical Park – Alaska, Washington, British Columbia and Yukon
- The Waterton-Glacier International Peace Park across the United States/Canada border was the first peace park in the Americas, formed by the merger of Waterton Lakes and Glacier National Parks in 1932. In contrast to other peace parks, the primary purpose of the union was to serve as a symbol of friendship and peace between the two countries.
- Roosevelt Campobello International Park – Maine, United States/New Brunswick, Canada
- Peace Arch Park, lies on the British Columbia/Washington border, and is famous for the Peace Arch, a large peace structure straddling the border itself.
- The border of Canada and the United States has multiple additional transboundary conservation complexes, including complexes composed of:
  1. Canada's Ivvavik National Park and Vuntut National Park, the Vuntut Gwitchin First Nation, and the United States' Arctic National Wildlife Refuge;
  2. British Columbia's Chilliwack Lake Provincial Park, Skagit Valley Provincial Park, and EC Manning Provincial Park, and the United States' Mt. Baker-Snoqualmie National Forest, North Cascades National Park, and Ross Lake National Recreation Area;
  3. North Dakota's Lake Metigoshe State Park, Manitoba's Turtle Mountain Provincial Park, the United States' Rabb Lake National Wildlife Refuge and the International Peace Garden; and
  4. Ontario's Sandpoint Island Provincial Park and Quetico Provincial Park, the United States' Voyageurs National Park and Superior National Forest, and Minnesota's Kabetogama State Forest.

===== Canadian interprovincial Parks =====
- Cypress Hills Interprovincial Park (Alberta–Saskatchewan)
- Kakwa-Willmore Interprovincial Park (Alberta–British Columbia)
- Manitoba–Ontario Interprovincial Wilderness Area
- Parc linéaire interprovincial Petit Témis (Quebec–New Brunswick)

===== United States interstate parks =====
- Interstate Park (Minnesota–Wisconsin)
- Palisades Interstate Park (New York–New Jersey)
- Breaks Interstate Park (Kentucky–Virginia)

==== Mexico and the United States ====
- Dry Borders-Sonoran Desert Biosphere Reserve Network is a transboundary conservation complex composed of Mexico's El Picante y Gran Desierto de Altar Biosphere Reserve and the United States' Organ Pipe Cactus National Monument.
- El Carmen-Big Bend Complex is a transboundary conservation complex composed of Mexico's Parque Nacional Canon de Santa Elena and Area Natural Protegida Maderas del Carmen, the United States' Big Bend National Park, and Texas' Big Bend Ranch State Park.

==== Latin America ====
- Maya Tropical Forest Complex is a transboundary conservation complex on the border of Belize, Guatemala and Mexico. It is partly composed of Guatemala's Sierra Del Lacandon National Park, Laguna del Tigre National Park, El Mirador and Maya Biosphere Reserve, Mexico's Calakmul Biosphere Reserve, and Belize's Rio Bravo Conservation and Management Area.
- Montecristo Trifinio Transboundary Protected Area Complex (also known as Trifinio Fraternidad) is a transboundary UNESCO biosphere reserve on the border of El Salvador, Guatemala, and Honduras. It is composed of El Salvador's Montecristo National Park, Guatemala's Trifinio Biosphere Reserve, and Honduras' Montecristo Trifinio National Park.
- Parque Internacional La Amistad is a UNESCO World Heritage Site on the border of Costa Rica and Panama. A bi-national Transboundary Protected Area Commission coordinates conservation efforts in the area.
- San Juan River Basin is a transboundary conservation complex on the border of Costa Rica and Nicaragua. It is composed of Costa Rica's Tortuguero National Park and Barra del Colorado Wildlife Refuge, and Nicaragua's Reserva Biologica Indio Maiz and Reserva Natural Punta Gorda.
- Volcan Tacana is a transboundary UNESCO biosphere reserve on the border of Guatemala and Mexico.
- A transboundary Ramsar wetlands complex lies on the border of Costa Rica and Panama, and is composed of the Jairo Mora Sandoval Gandoca-Manzanillo Mixed Wildlife Refuge site in Costa Rica and the San San-Pond Sak site in Panama. The Global Transboundary Conservation Network includes this site as part of Parque International La Amsted in its 2007 global inventory.
- A transboundary Ramsar wetlands complex lies on the on border of Belize and Guatemala, and is composed of Belize's Reserva de Usos Multiples Rio Sarstun and Guatemala's Sarstoon Temash National Park.
- The Global Transboundary Conservation Network's 2007 inventory lists additional TBPAs on the borders of:
  1. Belize, Guatemala, Honduras and Mexico;
  2. Guatemala and Honduras; and
  3. Honduras and Nicaragua at two locations.

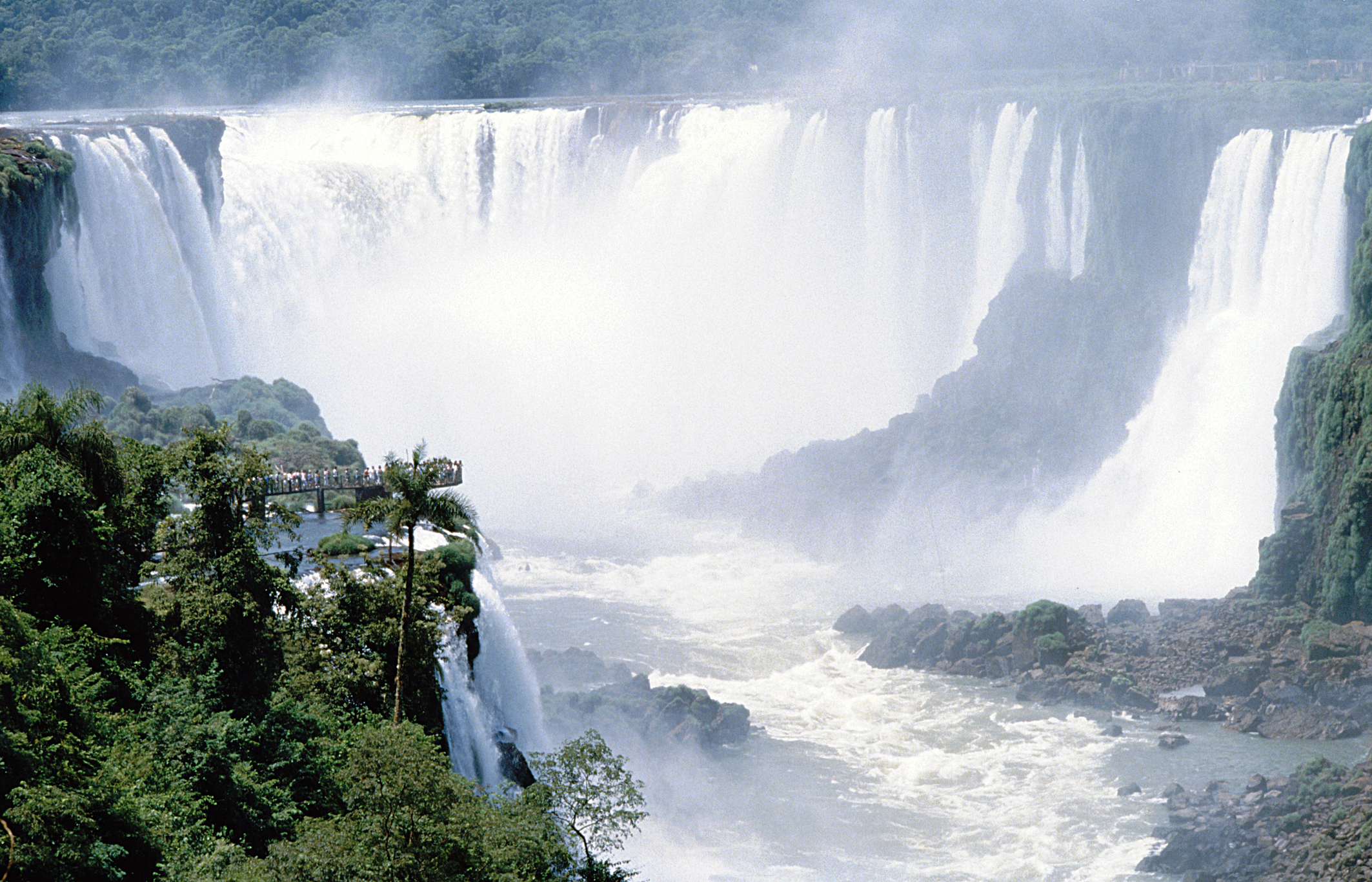
Iguazu Falls--National Parks in Argentina and Brazil form a TBPA.

- Cordillera del Condor is a transboundary protected area on the border of Ecuador and Peru. It is composed of Ecuador's Parque Nacional Podocarpus and Peru's Zona Reservada Santiago-Comaina. The countries agreed to create the protected area as part of a settlement to a border conflict in the 1990s.
- Glaciares-Torres del Paine-O'Higgins Complex is a transboundary conservation complex on the border of Argentina and Chile. It is composed of Chile's O'Higgins National Park and Torres del Paine National Park and Argentina's Los Glaciares National Park.
- Iguacu-Iguazu is a transboundary World Heritage complex on the border of Argentina and Brazil. It is composed of Argentina's Iguazu National Park and Brazil's Iguaçu National Park.
- Lago Titicaca is a transboundary Ramsar wetlands complex on the border of Bolivia and Peru.
- The Global Transboundary Conservation Network's 2007 inventory lists additional TBPAs on the borders of:
  1. Colombia and Venezuela;
  2. Brazil and Colombia;
  3. Colombia, Ecuador and Peru;
  4. Brazil and Venezuela;
  5. French Guiana and Suriname;
  6. Brazil and Suriname;
  7. Brazil and Peru;
  8. Bolivia and Brazil;
  9. Bolivia, Brazil and Paraguay;
  10. Argentina and Brazil;
  11. Bolivia and Chile;
  12. Argentina, Bolivia and Chile;
  13. Argentina and Bolivia at two locations;
  14. Bolivia and Paraguay; and
  15. Argentina and Chile at four locations.

Intercontinental Biosphere Reserve of the Mediterranean includes land in Morocco and Spain (light green), and part of the Strait of Gibraltar (dark blue).

=== Intercontinental TBPAs ===
- Great Altay is a transboundary UNESCO biosphere reserve crossing the border of Kazakhstan and Russia.
- Intercontinental Biosphere Reserve of the Mediterranean is a transboundary UNESCO biosphere crossing the border of Morocco and Spain. It is a contiguous site, combining land in Morocco and Spain connected by the Strait of Gibraltar.
- A transboundary UNESCO World Heritage complex is on the border of Colombia and Panama. It is composed primarily of Colombia's Los Katios National Park and Panama's Darien National Park.

== Areas in the conceptual phase ==
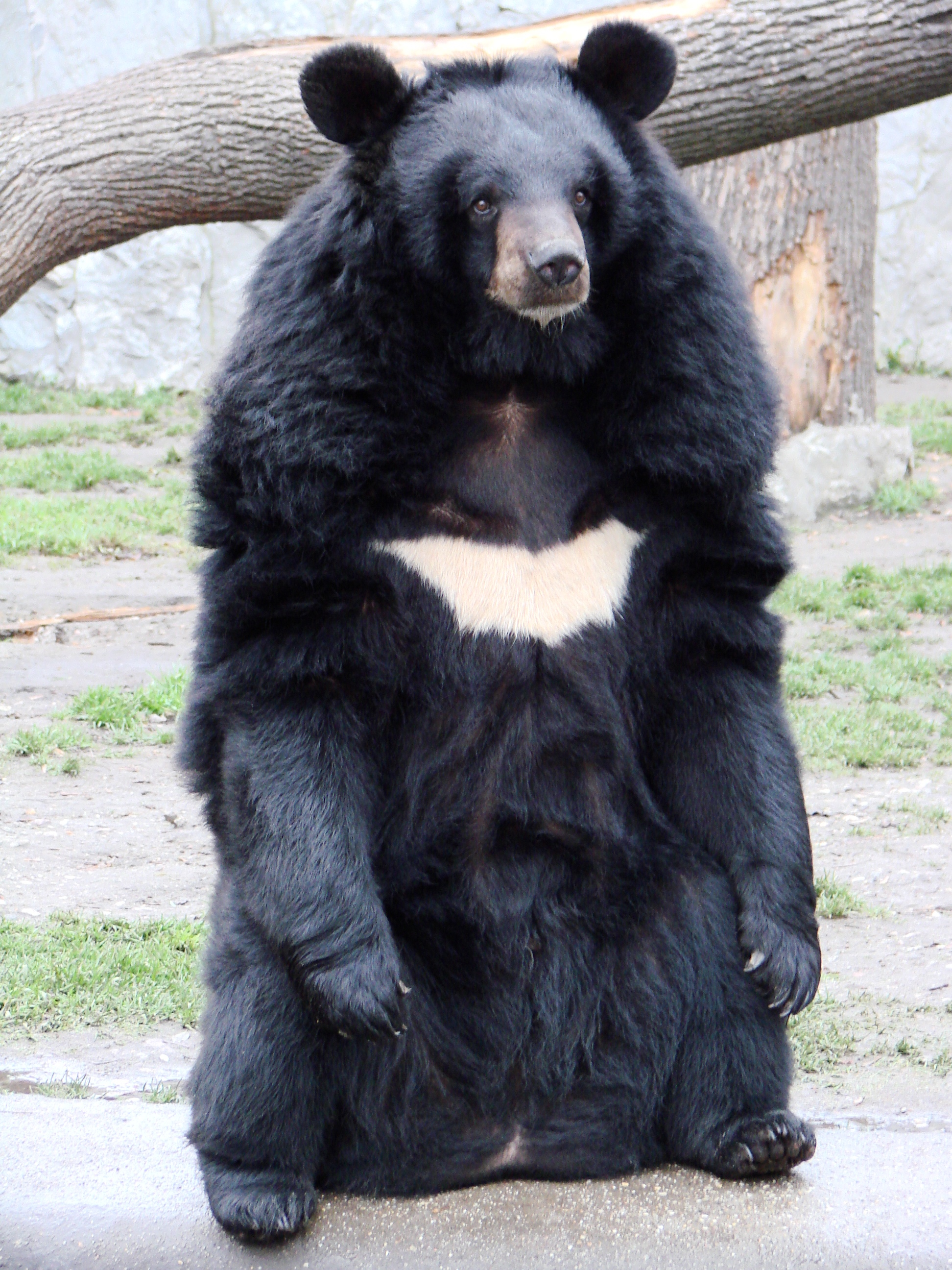
The DMZ is a habitat for many threatened species on the Korean peninsula, including the black bear.

TBPA advocates by 2006 had identified additional sites for protection. Professor Saleem Ali of the University of Vermont noted that "numerous ecologically sensitive areas remain unprotected" and cites a 2006 "geographic information systems (GIS) study" that "found 104 transboundary wild areas involving 61 countries that are not formally part of any conservation park." Specific sites for proposed TBPAs include:

- Liuwa Plain – Kameia TFCA (Angola/Zambia)
- Niassa Reserve – Selous TFCA (Mozambique/Tanzania)
- Mnazi Bay – Quirimbas Transfrontier Marine Conservation Area (Mozambique/Tanzania)
- The demilitarised zone between North and South Korea is a potential TBPA/peace park. Professor Salem Ali notes that the DMZ has "become a sanctuary for wildlife, since there is no development activity occurring in the area." Nelson Mandela traveled to South Korea to promote such an idea. Ted Turner likewise traveled to the Korean peninsula to promote the idea in 2005.
- The Siachen Glacier region between India and Pakistan has been proposed as a peace park.
- A project for the Green Line Peace Park in Cyprus, between the Turkish Cypriot and Greek Cypriot territories, is being researched by Dr Anna Grichting at Harvard University.

As awareness of the importance of conserving the pristinity and ecology of Arctic region has increased, there has been a global call to declare the Arctic region as a global sanctuary/international peace park. The Save the Arctic campaign by Greenpeace, an environmental nonprofit organisation, has received online support from more than 5 million citizens from around the world.

== Areas with treaty signed ==
- Kgalagadi Transfrontier Park (Botswana/South Africa), opened on 12 May 2000.
- Ai-Ais/Richtersveld Transfrontier Park (Namibia/South Africa) (see also Nama people: Namaqua and Ai-Ais Hot Springs), signed on 17 August 2001.
- Great Limpopo Transfrontier Park, signed on 10 November 2000.

== Memorandums of agreement signed ==
- Limpopo-Shashe TFCA (Botswana/South Africa/Zimbabwe), originally signed on 22 June 2006. Now renamed, see: Greater Mapungubwe Transfrontier Conservation Area.
- Lubombo Transfrontier Conservation and Resource Area (Mozambique/South Africa/Eswatini)
- Maloti-Drakensberg Transfrontier Conservation and Development Area (Lesotho/South Africa), signed on 11 June 2001.
- Iona – Skeleton Coast Transfrontier Conservation Area (Angola and Namibia), signed on 3 May 2018.
- Kavango–Zambezi Transfrontier Conservation Area (KAZA) (Angola, Botswana, Namibia, Zambia and Zimbabwe), signed on 7 December 2006. This will be the world's largest peace park, covering areas in 5 different countries.
- Malawi – Zambia TFCA (Malawi/Zambia), signed on 13 August 2004.
- Chimanimani TFCA (Mozambique/Zimbabwe)

== Impacts on peace and conflict ==
Transboundary protected areas are also termed peace parks. They are supposed to facilitate cooperation and exchange between (adversary) countries, to improve livelihoods of local populations, to demonstrate the possibility of positive-sum interactions, and hence to support more peaceful international relations. There are several cases documented in which trans-boundary conservation contributed to conflict resolution (although it was not the main driver), such as in the Virunga region between the DR Congo, Rwanda and Uganda, around the Trifinio region between El Salvador and Honduras, and in the Cordillera del Cóndor region between Ecuador and Peru. According to a statistical analysis published in 2014, states that share a trans-boundary protected area are slightly less likely to engage with militarized disputes with each other. But the question remains whether the TBPA is a driver or consequence on better interstate relations in these cases. A more recent analysis triangulates data from various sources to show that international environmental cooperation (in the form of TBPAs and water treaties) increases the likelihood for reconciliation between states in conflict. The effect is, however, modest and contingent on a number of context factors such as high levels of environmental attention, internal political stability, a tradition of environmental cooperation and already ongoing processes of reconciliation.

However, a number of authors criticize that peace parks have a very limited impact on formal relations between states, but can accelerate conflicts on the local level, for instance by extending (authoritarian) state control, by prioritizing business and tourism over the interests of local populations, and by excluding local people from the protected areas. TBPAs can also stimulate (low-level) international conflicts, for instance about the sharing of revenues or the presence of human populations in the parks.

== Massive Online Open Course on Peace Park Development and Management ==
A Massive Online Open Course on Peace Park Development and Management was developed by the Secretariat of the Convention on Biological Diversity (SCBD), its Peace and Biodiversity Dialogue Initiative in partnership with UNDP and the NBSAP Forum. This free three-week course offered in five languages: English, French, Spanish, Russian and Arabic. Financial support is provided by the Secretariat of the Convention on Biological Diversity's Peace and Biodiversity Dialogue Initiative funded by the Ministry of Environment of the Republic of Korea.

This course will:

- offer a comprehensive guide on Peace Park establishment;
- teach participants to make a strong case for Peace Park development;
- develop the skills to effectively plan, establish and manage Peace Parks;
- address the challenges associated with the creation and management of these transboundary protected areas.

The course is designed for Peace Park development practitioners and environmental peacebuilding enthusiasts but is open to everyone. Participants must create an account on Learning for Nature before registering for the course.

== See also ==
- Conservation area
- Habitat conservation
- Marine Protected Area
