= Astrothelium neoinspersum =

Scientific classification
- Kingdom: Fungi
- Division: Ascomycota
- Class: Dothideomycetes
- Order: Trypetheliales
- Family: Trypetheliaceae
- Genus: Astrothelium
- Species: A. neoinspersum

Binomial name
- Astrothelium neoinspersum Aptroot (2016)

Species of lichen

Astrothelium neoinspersum is a species of corticolous (bark-dwelling), crustose lichen in the family Trypetheliaceae. Found in El Salvador, it was formally described as a new species in 2016 by Dutch lichenologist André Aptroot. The type specimen was collected by Harrie Sipman from Montecristo National Park (Metapán, Santa Ana Department); there, it was found in a rainforest growing on smooth tree bark. The lichen has a smooth and somewhat shiny, olive-green thallus with a cortex but without a prothallus. It covers areas of up to 5 cm (2 in) in diameter.

The presence of the lichen does not induce the formation of galls in the host plant. The only lichen product detected from collected specimens using thin-layer chromatography was an anthraquinone compound. The combination of characteristics of the lichen that distinguish it from others in Astrothelium are the yellow pigment in the ascomata; the form of the ascomata ("diffusely pseudostromatic"); and the arrangement of the ascomata (in irregular lines). The bright yellow pseudostromata help distinguish Astrothelium neoinspersum from the otherwise similar A. aenascens, found in Papua New Guinea.
