= Radichkov Peak =

Location of Tangra Mountains on Livingston Island in the South Shetland Islands.

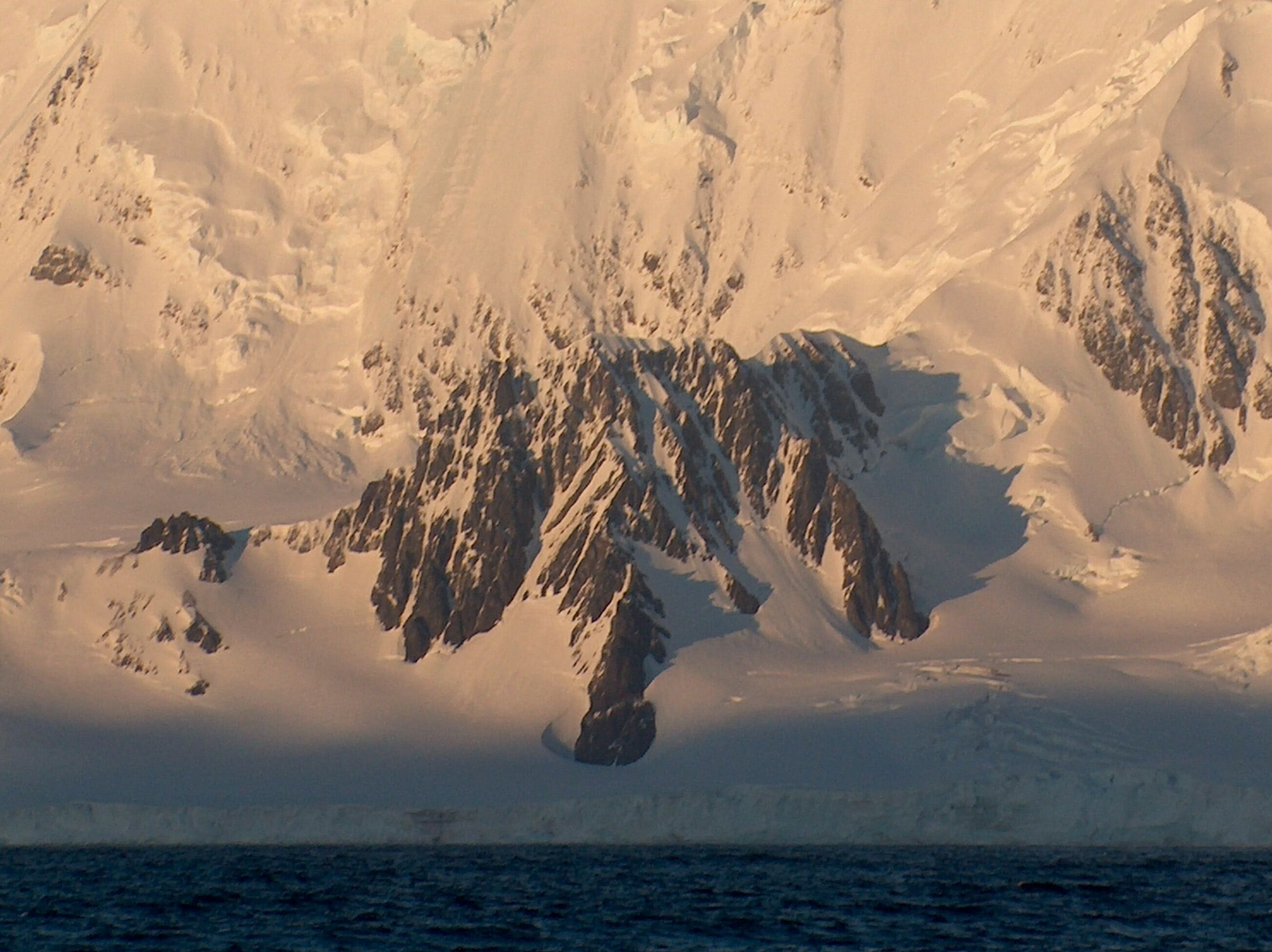
Radichkov Peak from Bransfield Strait.

Topographic map of Livingston Island, Greenwich, Robert, Snow and Smith Islands.

Radichkov Peak (Bulgarian: Радичков връх, romanized: Radichkov vrah, IPA: [rɐˈdit͡ʃkov ˈvrɤx]) rises to 500 m in Levski Ridge, Tangra Mountains, eastern Livingston Island in the South Shetland Islands, Antarctica. The peak overlooks Srebarna Glacier to the southwest and Magura Glacier to the northeast and has steep and ice-free eastern slopes. An offshoot extending 900 m in south direction ends up in Kalofer Peak, forming M'Kean Point to the southeast.

The peak is named after the Bulgarian writer Yordan Radichkov (1929–2004).

== Location ==
The cliff is located at 62°40′53″S 60°01′16.5″W, which is 2.13 km southeast of Great Needle Peak (Pico Falsa Aguja), 2.86 km south of Helmet Peak, 4.16 km southwest of Kuber Peak and 1.3 km north-northwest of M’Kean Point (Bulgarian mapping in 2005 and 2009).

== Maps ==
- L.L. Ivanov et al. Antarctica: Livingston Island and Greenwich Island, South Shetland Islands. Scale 1:100000 topographic map. Sofia: Antarctic Place-names Commission of Bulgaria, 2005.
- L.L. Ivanov. Antarctica: Livingston Island and Greenwich, Robert, Snow and Smith Islands. Scale 1:120000 topographic map. Troyan: Manfred Wörner Foundation, 2009. ISBN 978-954-92032-6-4
- A. Kamburov and L. Ivanov. Bowles Ridge and Central Tangra Mountains: Livingston Island, Antarctica. Scale 1:25000 map. Sofia: Manfred Wörner Foundation, 2023. ISBN 978-619-90008-6-1
