= Astrothelium aeneoides =

Scientific classification
- Kingdom: Fungi
- Division: Ascomycota
- Class: Dothideomycetes
- Order: Trypetheliales
- Family: Trypetheliaceae
- Genus: Astrothelium
- Species: A. aeneoides

Binomial name
- Astrothelium aeneoides Aptroot (2016)

Species of lichen-forming fungus

Astrothelium aeneoides is a species of corticolous (bark-dwelling), crustose lichen in the family Trypetheliaceae. It is found in Brazil, Guyana, and Puerto Rico, where it grows on the smooth bark of rainforest trees.

== Taxonomy ==
The lichen was formally described as a new species in 2016 by Dutch lichenologist André Aptroot. The type specimen was collected by Aptroot in 1997 from the Parque Natural do Caraça in Serra do Caraça (Minas Gerais, Brazil) at an elevation of 1,250 m (4,100 ft). The species epithet aeneoides alludes to its resemblance with Astrothelium aeneum.

== Description ==
Astrothelium aeneoides has an olive-green to olive-grey, smooth and somewhat shiny thallus up to 8 cm (3.1 in) in diameter and about 0.2 mm thick. Its ascomata are immersed in the thallus; they are spherical, measuring 0.7–1.0 mm in diameter and arranged in groups of 2 to 5. They are contained in structures called pseudostromata (resembling a perithecium but containing both fungal tissue and substrate tissue) that have a raised surface texture distinct from that of the surrounding thallus. The ascospores, which number eight per ascus, are hyaline, spindle-shaped (fusiform) with rounded ends, have 3 septa, and measure 20–25 by 6–9 μm. The internal chambers formed by the septa (the lumina) are diamond shaped. The use of thin-layer chromatography reveals the presence of a lichen product that the author suggests is parietin. The expected results of standard chemical spot tests are: thallus surface UV−, thallus medulla K−; pseudostroma surface UV+ (pink to orange), medulla of pseudostroma K+ (blood red).

Astrothelium aeneum is similar in morphology; A. aenoides differs by a lack of orange pigment on the thallus. Another similar species, A. aenascens, is distinguished from A. aenoides by the presence of an inspersed hamathecium. Astrothelium flavostromatum is another lookalike that is distinguished by a strongly convex and swollen (bullate) thallus and a cream-coloured pseudostromata.

== See also ==
- List of lichens of Brazil
