= TFCA =

TFCA may refer to:

- Transfrontier conservation area, a protected area that spans across boundaries of multiple countries or country subdivisions, where the political border sections that are enclosed within its area are abolished
- Toronto Film Critics Association, an organization of film reviewers from Toronto-based publications
- Toronto FC Academy, the academy team of Toronto FC
