= Astrothelium megaeneum =

Scientific classification
- Kingdom: Fungi
- Division: Ascomycota
- Class: Dothideomycetes
- Order: Trypetheliales
- Family: Trypetheliaceae
- Genus: Astrothelium
- Species: A. megaeneum

Binomial name
- Astrothelium megaeneum Flakus & Aptroot (2016)

Species of lichen

Astrothelium megaeneum is a species of corticolous (bark-dwelling) lichen in the family Trypetheliaceae. Found in Bolivia, it was formally described as a new species in 2016 by lichenologists Adam Flakus and André Aptroot. The type specimen was collected in Noel Kempff Mercado National Park (José Miguel de Velasco Province, Santa Cruz Department); there, at an altitude of 205 m (673 ft), it was found growing on bark in Beni savanna. It is only known to occur at the type locality. The species epithet megaeneum refers to both its characteristic large ascomata and ascospores, and its similarity to Astrothelium aeneum.
