= Astrothelium aurantiacocinereum =

Scientific classification
- Domain: Eukaryota
- Kingdom: Fungi
- Division: Ascomycota
- Class: Dothideomycetes
- Order: Trypetheliales
- Family: Trypetheliaceae
- Genus: Astrothelium
- Species: A. aurantiacocinereum

Binomial name
- Astrothelium aurantiacocinereum Lücking, Naksuwankul & Lumbsch (2016)

Species of lichen

Astrothelium aurantiacocinereum is a species of corticolous (bark-dwelling), crustose lichen in the family Trypetheliaceae. It occurs in New Caledonia.

== Taxonomy ==
The lichen was formally described as a new species in 2016 by Robert Lücking, Khwanruan Naksuwankul, and H. Thorsten Lumbsch. The type specimen was collected by Naksuwankul and Lumbsch from Monts Dzumac (Dumbéa, Province Sud), at an altitude of 920 m (3,020 ft); there, in a relict montane forest, it was growing on bark. The species epithet alludes to the colour contrast between the orange pseudostromata and the grey thallus.

== Description ==
The lichen has a smooth to uneven, dark grey to brownish-grey thallus that covers areas of up to 10 cm (4 in). The photobiont partner of the lichen is in an endoperidermal layer (the inner of the two layers of the peridium), suggesting a low degree of lichenisation. The ascomata are in the form of perithecia, which occur in aggregated groups of 5–20 in pseudostromata. These structures are covered with a carbonised (blackened) layer that is topped by an orange pigment layer. Ascospores number eight per ascus and have a spindle-shaped (fusiform) to ellipsoid shape; their dimensions are 22–27 by 8–10 μm.

The characteristics of the lichen that distinguish it from others in genus Astrothelium are the barely lichenized, grey thallus; and the distinctly pseudostromatic ascomata, with prominent to sessile pseudostromata, with an orange cover that strongly contrasts with thallus. Astrothelium aeneum is somewhat similar in appearance, but this lookalike differs from A. aurantiacocinereum in the degree of lichenisation, the form of the pseudostromata, and the presence of pigment on the surface of the thallus.
