= Trifinio Fraternidad Transboundary Biosphere Reserve =

Protected area in El Salvador, Guatemala, and Honduras

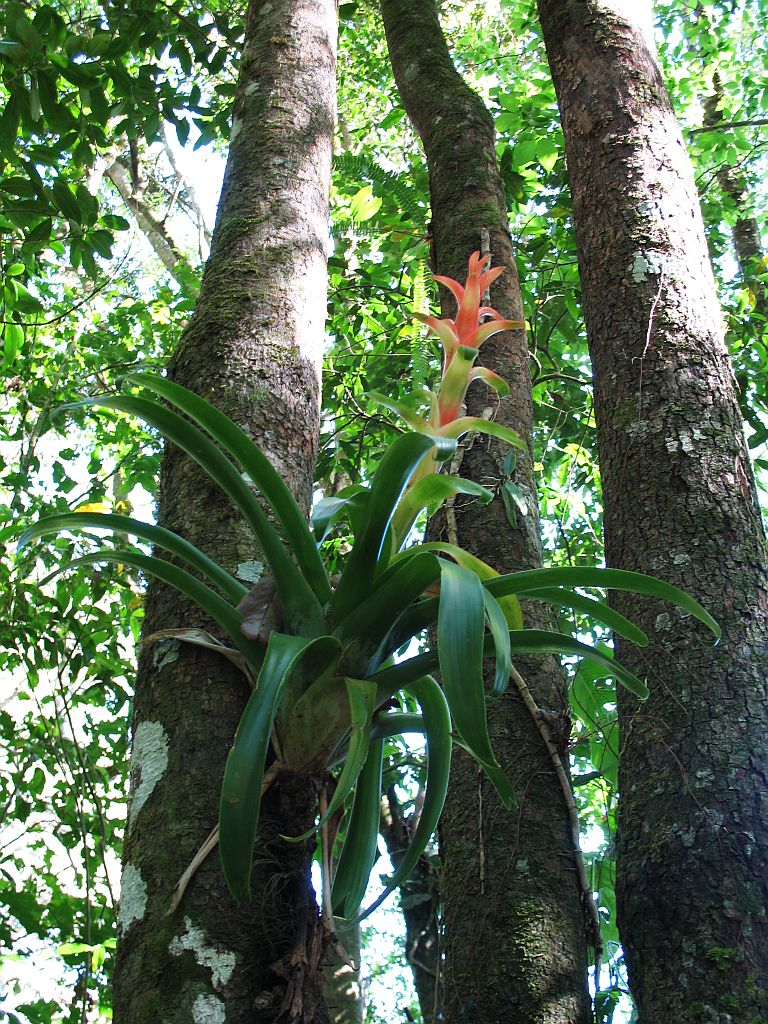
- Tillandsia candelifera growing on tree trunks in El Salvador's Montecristo National Park

- Location within Central America
- Location: Chiquimula Department of Guatemala, Santa Ana Department of El Salvador, and Ocotepeque Department of Honduras
- Coordinates: 14°25′15″N 89°21′22″W
- Area: 1,195.14 km^{2} (461.45 sq mi)
- Designation: UNESCO-MAB Biosphere Reserve
- Designated: 2011
- Governing body: Management Committee of the Biosphere Reserve

The Trifinio Fraternidad Transboundary Biosphere Reserve is a transboundary protected area located where the borders of El Salvador, Guatemala and Honduras meet (thus the prefix tri in its name). It protects the Montecristo massif and its cloud forests across the three countries' borders.

== Geography ==
The reserve covers an area of 1195.14 km^{2}, including 590.56 km^{2} in El Salvador, 221.79 km^{2} in Guatemala, and 382.79 km^{2} in Honduras.

The biosphere reserve was designated by UNESCO and the three countries in 2011. It incorporated some established protected areas, including Trifinio Biosphere Reserve in Guatemala (221.79 km^{2}), which was established in 1987, Montecristo Trifinio National Park in Honduras (82.15 km^{2}), was established in 1987, and Montecristo National Park in El Salvador (19.73 km^{2}), which was established in 2008.

The reserve protects Montecristo massif, a highland area isolated from other mountains. The highest peak is Cerro Montecristo (2,418 m). The massif is in the upper basin of the Lempa River, which drains into the Pacific Ocean.

== Flora and fauna ==
The biosphere reserve was created to protect the Montecristo cloud forest and its rare flora and fauna. A survey of the tri-national area found 3000 species of plants, 280 bird species, 98 mammal species, and 50 species of amphibians and reptiles.

The main plant communities are pine–oak forest, which grows between 800 and 2000 meters elevation, and cloud forest, which grows above 2000 meters elevation. Dry forests surround the massif at lower elevations.

The pine–oak belt includes pine–oak and pine–oak–sweetgum forests.

The dense cloud forest of oak and laurel trees, which grow up to 30 meters high, houses rare wildlife species like the two-fingered anteater, striped owls, toucans, agoutis, pumas, and spider monkeys.

== Conservation ==
Protection of the Montecristo massif was a joint initiative of these three countries, which resulted in the creation of the Montecristo Trifinio National Park in Honduras and the Montecristo National Park in El Salvador, as well as the Guatemalan Trifinio biosphere reserve.

The protection of the Montecristo massif was part of a broader plan, known as the Trifinio plan, to develop this border region.
