= Kalofer Peak =

Location of Tangra Mountains on Livingston Island in the South Shetland Islands.

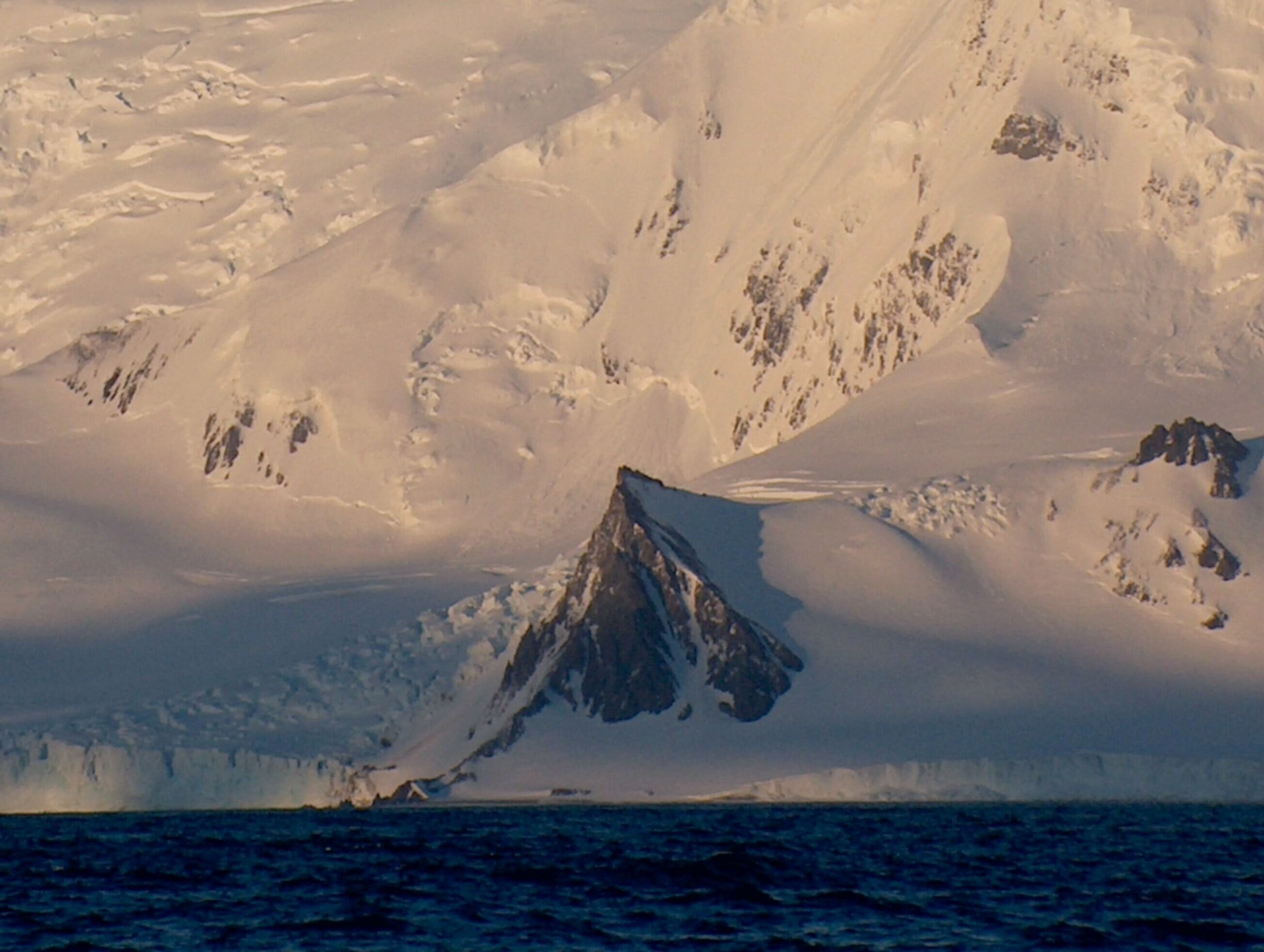
Kalofer Peak from Bransfield Strait.

Topographic map of Livingston Island, Greenwich, Robert, Snow and Smith Islands.

Kalofer Peak (Bulgarian: връх Калофер, romanized: vrah Kalofer, IPA: [ˈvrɤx kɐˈɫɔfɛr]) is a 300 m sharp rocky peak in the Levski Ridge, Tangra Mountains on Livingston Island in the South Shetland Islands, Antarctica. The peak is named after the town of Kalofer in Central Bulgaria.

== Location ==
The peak is located at 62°41′23.4″S 60°01′03.7″W which is 960 m south of Radichkov Peak, 410 m northwest of M'Kean Point (formed by an offshoot of the peak), 2.19 km southeast of Serdica Peak and 2.15 km northeast of Christoff Cliff.

== Maps ==
- L.L. Ivanov et al. Antarctica: Livingston Island and Greenwich Island, South Shetland Islands. Scale 1:100000 topographic map. Sofia: Antarctic Place-names Commission of Bulgaria, 2005.
- L.L. Ivanov. Antarctica: Livingston Island and Greenwich, Robert, Snow and Smith Islands. Scale 1:120000 topographic map. Troyan: Manfred Wörner Foundation, 2009.
