= Astrothelium flavostromatum =

Scientific classification
- Kingdom: Fungi
- Division: Ascomycota
- Class: Dothideomycetes
- Order: Trypetheliales
- Family: Trypetheliaceae
- Genus: Astrothelium
- Species: A. flavostromatum

Binomial name
- Astrothelium flavostromatum Aptroot & M.Cáceres (2016)

Species of lichen-forming fungus

Astrothelium flavostromatum is a species of crustose lichen-forming fungus in the family Trypetheliaceae. It was formally described as new to science by André Aptroot and Marcela Cáceres, based on material collected in Brazil (Rondônia state) in the Parque Natural Municipal de Porto Velho, near rainforest. The lichen grows on tree bark and forms a continuous, somewhat shiny, olive-green to olive-gray thallus that can cover patches up to about 5 cm (2 in) across. The surface is characteristically blistered (bullate) and can cause gall-like swellings in the host bark.

The fruiting bodies are globose and are grouped within cream-coloured pseudostromata that are often linear to irregular and may form a net-like pattern on the thallus. The pseudostromata may be dusted with yellow pruina. Spores are hyaline, three-septate, and spindle-shaped, measuring about 23–25 × 9–10 μm, and are surrounded by a thin gelatinous layer. No pycnidia have been observed. Chemical tests indicate UV-negative thallus tissues but UV-positive (pink to orange) pseudostromata, with a K (potassium hydroxide solution) reaction turning pigmented parts blood red. Thin-layer chromatography detected an anthraquinone, probably parietin. A. flavostromatum is known only from Brazil and is most similar to Astrothelium aeneoides, from which it differs mainly in its blistered thallus and cream pseudostromata. No additional collections had been reported from Brazil as of 2025.

== See also ==
- List of lichens of Brazil
