= M'Kean Point =

Location of Livingston Island in the South Shetland Islands.

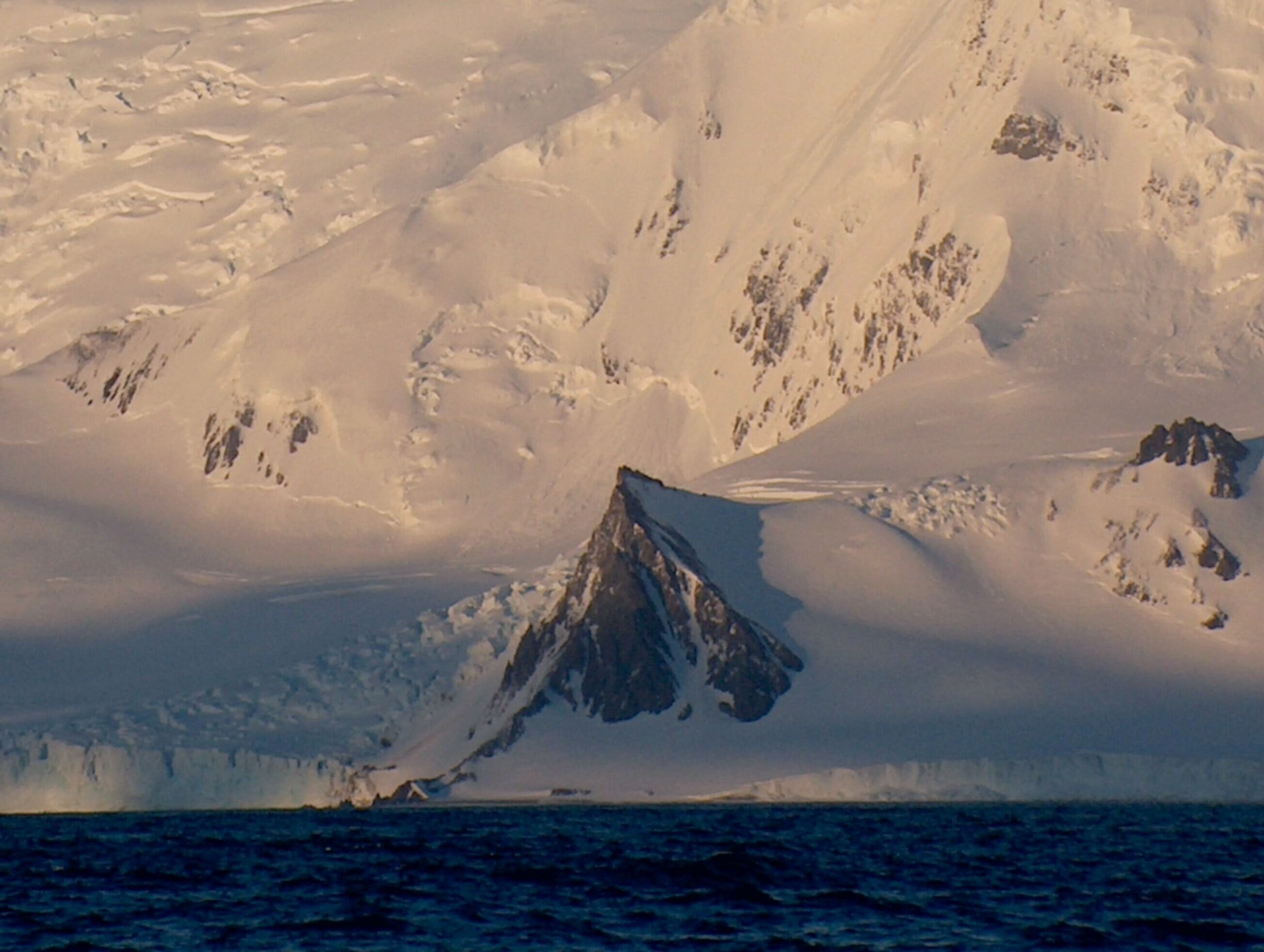
M'Kean Point and Kalofer Peak from Bransfield Strait.

Topographic map of Livingston Island, Greenwich, Robert, Snow and Smith Islands.

M'Kean Point on the southeast coast of Livingston Island in the South Shetland Islands, Antarctica is formed by an offshoot of Kalofer Peak. The point separates the termini of Srebarna Glacier to the southwest and Magura Glacier to the north-northeast.

The point is named after Captain J. M'Kean, Master of the British Indian sealing vessel Princess Charlotte that visited the area in 1821–22.

== Location ==
The point is located at 62°41′31.8″S 60°00′41″W which is 17.32 km east-northeast of Botev Point, 2.6 km northeast of Aytos Point, 3.3 km southeast of Great Needle Peak and 13.99 km southwest of Renier Point. British mapping in 1968, Spanish in 1991, and Bulgarian in 2005 and 2009.

== Maps ==
- L.L. Ivanov et al. Antarctica: Livingston Island and Greenwich Island, South Shetland Islands. Scale 1:100000 topographic map. Sofia: Antarctic Place-names Commission of Bulgaria, 2005.
- L.L. Ivanov. Antarctica: Livingston Island and Greenwich, Robert, Snow and Smith Islands. Scale 1:120000 topographic map. Troyan: Manfred Wörner Foundation, 2009. ISBN 978-954-92032-6-4
