= Srebarna Glacier =

Glacier in Antarctica

Srebarna Ice Piedmont
- Location of Tangra Mountains on Livingston Island in the South Shetland Islands

- Location within South Shetland Islands Location within Antarctica
- Location: Livingston Island; South Shetland Islands
- Coordinates: 62°41′25″S 60°02′20″W
- Length: 1.2 nautical miles (2.2 km; 1.4 mi)
- Width: 1 nautical mile (1.9 km; 1.2 mi)
- Thickness: unknown
- Terminus: Bransfield Strait
- Status: unknown

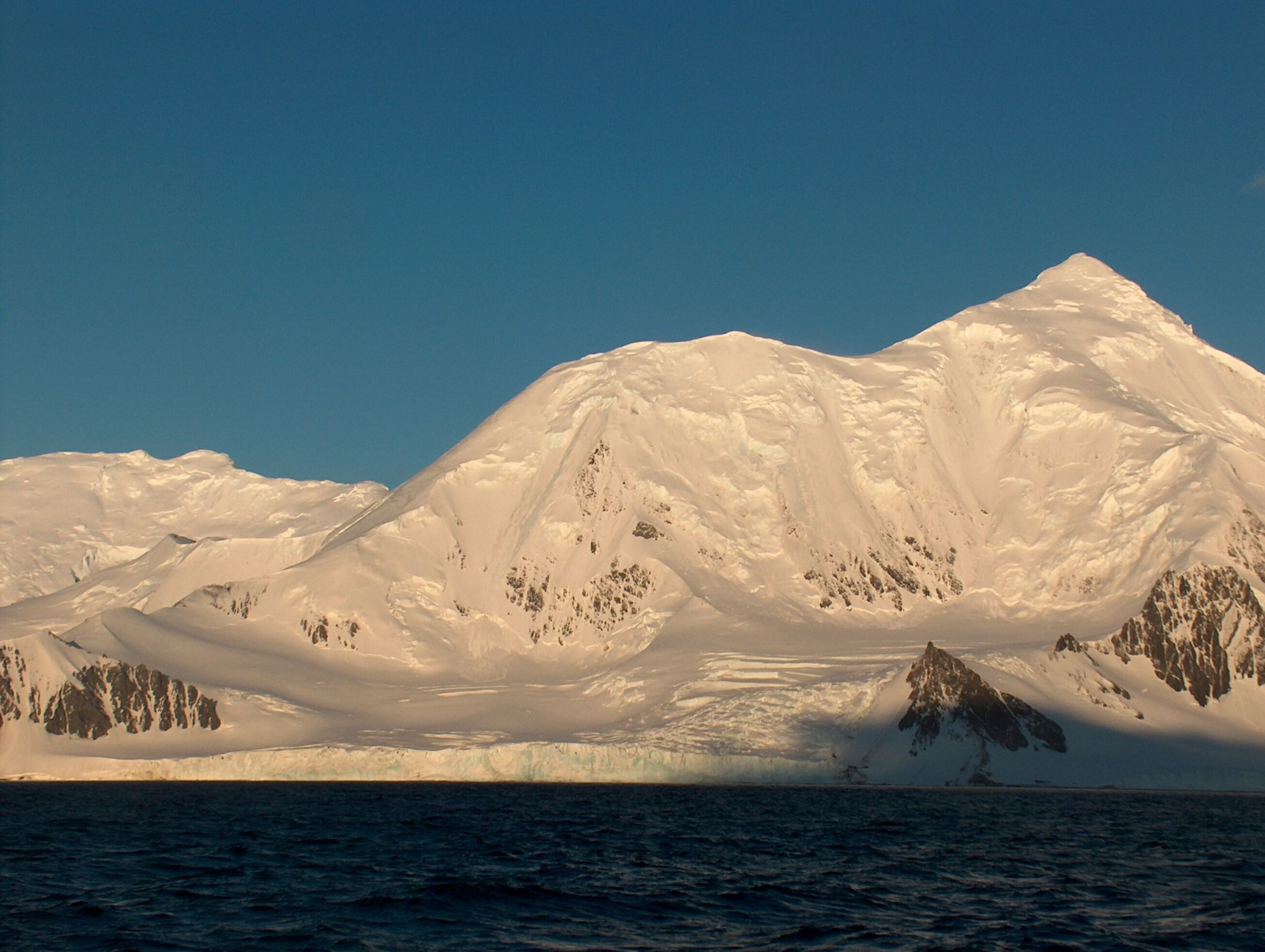
Srebarna Glacier from Bransfield Strait, with Great Needle Peak on the right

Topographic map of Livingston Island and Smith Islands

Srebarna Glacier (Bulgarian: ледник Сребарна, romanized: lednik Srebarna, IPA: [ˈlɛdnik ˈsrɛbɐrnɐ]) on Livingston Island in the South Shetland Islands, Antarctica is situated east-northeast of Boyana Glacier, southeast of the head of Macy Glacier and southwest of Magura Glacier. It extends 2.3 km in southwest-northeast direction and 1.8 km in northwest-southeast direction, and drains southeast of Serdica Peak and the Great Needle Peak in Levski Ridge, Tangra Mountains to enter Bransfield Strait between Aytos Point and M'Kean Point.

The glacier is named after Srebarna Lake in northeastern Bulgaria.

== Location ==
Srebarna Glacier is centred at 62°41′25″S 60°02′20″W. Bulgarian mapping in 2005 and 2009.

== See also ==
- List of glaciers in the Antarctic
- Glaciology

== Maps ==
- L.L. Ivanov et al. Antarctica: Livingston Island and Greenwich Island, South Shetland Islands. Scale 1:100000 topographic map. Sofia: Antarctic Place-names Commission of Bulgaria, 2005.
- L.L. Ivanov. Antarctica: Livingston Island and Greenwich, Robert, Snow and Smith Islands. Scale 1:120000 topographic map. Troyan: Manfred Wörner Foundation, 2009. ISBN 978-954-92032-6-4
- A. Kamburov and L. Ivanov. Bowles Ridge and Central Tangra Mountains: Livingston Island, Antarctica. Scale 1:25000 map. Sofia: Manfred Wörner Foundation, 2023. ISBN 978-619-90008-6-1
