= Astrothelium aenascens =

Scientific classification
- Kingdom: Fungi
- Division: Ascomycota
- Class: Dothideomycetes
- Order: Trypetheliales
- Family: Trypetheliaceae
- Genus: Astrothelium
- Species: A. aenascens

Binomial name
- Astrothelium aenascens Aptroot (2016)

Species of lichen

Astrothelium aenascens is a species of corticolous (bark-dwelling) lichen in the family Trypetheliaceae. Found in Papua New Guinea, it was formally described as a new species in 2016 by André Aptroot. The type specimen was collected from Varirata National Park (Central Province), where it was found growing on smooth tree bark. The lichen has a smooth and shiny thallus that covers areas of up to 5 cm (2 in) in diameter. The species epithet aenascens refers to the lichen's resemblance with Astrothelium aeneum. Thin-layer chromatography shows that the lichen contains an anthraquinone, which the author suggests is probably parietin.
