= Trifinio Biosphere Reserve =

Protected area in Guatemala

- IUCN category VI (protected area with sustainable use of natural resources)
- Location within Guatemala
- Location: Chiquimula Department, Guatemala
- Coordinates: 14°25′15″N 89°21′22″W
- Area: 221.79 km^{2} (85.63 sq mi)
- Designation: Biosphere reserve
- Designated: 1987
- Governing body: CONAP / MAGA / PLAN Trifinio

The Trifinio Biosphere Reserve is a protected area in Guatemala, located where the borders of Guatemala, El Salvador, and Honduras meet (thus the prefix tri in its name). The reserve was created in 1987, and has an area of 221.79 km^{2}. It protects the Guatemalan portion of the Montecristo massif and its cloud forests, and is the Guatemalan portion of the Trifinio Fraternidad Transboundary Biosphere Reserve, which spans the three countries' borders.

== Flora and fauna ==
The biosphere reserve was created to protect the Montecristo cloud forest and its rare flora and fauna. The dense cloud forest of oak and laurel trees, which grow up to 30 meters high, houses rare wildlife species like the two-fingered anteater, striped owls, toucans, agoutis, pumas, and spider monkeys.

== Conservation ==
Protection of the Montecristo massif was a joint initiative of these three countries. Guatemala's Trifinio Biosphere Reserve and Honduras' Montecristo Trifinio National Park were created in 1987. El Salvador's Montecristo National Park was created in 2008. The international biosphere reserve was created in 2011.

The protection of the Montecristo massif was part of a broader plan, known as the Trifinio plan, to develop this border region.
