= Srebarna Nature Reserve =

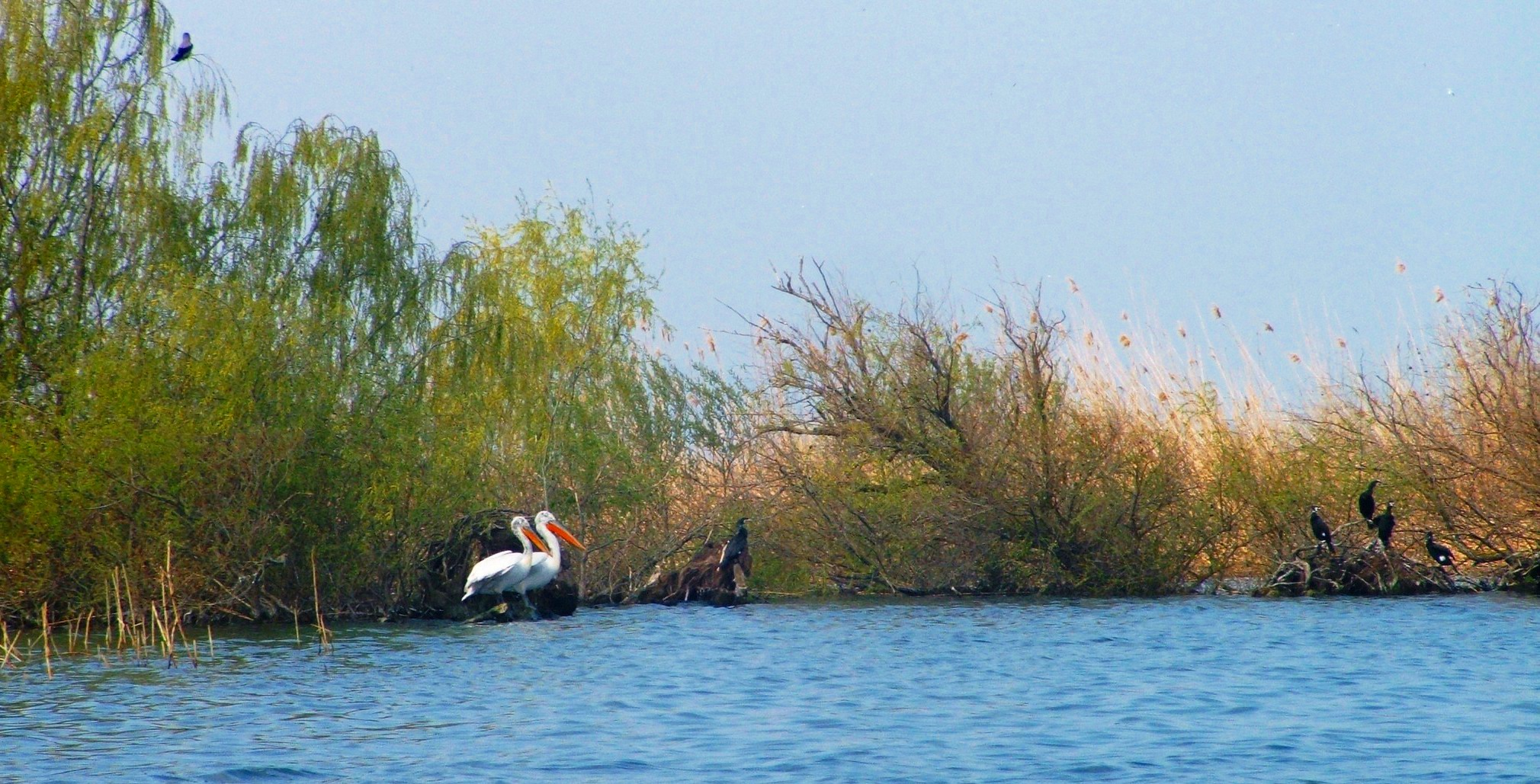
- Lake Srebarna

- Location within Bulgaria
- Location: Silistra Province, Bulgaria
- Nearest city: Silistra
- Coordinates: 44°06′52″N 27°04′41″E
- Established: 1948

UNESCO World Heritage Site
- Criteria: Natural: (x)
- Reference: 219bis
- Inscription: 1983 (7th Session)
- Extensions: 2008
- Area: 638 ha (1,580 acres)
- Buffer zone: 673 ha (1,660 acres)

Ramsar Wetland
- Official name: Srébarna
- Designated: 24 September 1975
- Reference no.: 64

The Srebarna Nature Reserve (Bulgarian: Природен резерват Сребърна, transliterated as Priroden rezervat Srebarna) is a nature reserve in northeastern Bulgaria (Southern Dobruja), near the village of the same name, 18 kilometers (11 mi) west of Silistra and two kilometers (1.2 mi) south of the Danube. It comprises Lake Srebarna and its surroundings, and is an important wetland located on the Via Pontica, a bird migration route between Europe and Africa. As a result, it provides nesting and migratory habitat for many endangered bird species.

The reserve embraces six square kilometers (2.3 mi^{2}) of protected area and a buffer zone of 5.4 square kilometers (2.1 mi^{2}). The lake's depth varies from one to three meters (3.3 to 9.8 ft). There is a museum constructed, where a collection of stuffed species typical for the reserve is arranged.

== History ==
While Lake Srebarna was studied many times in the past by foreign biologists, the first Bulgarian scientist to take an interest in the area was Aleksi Petrov, who visited the reserve in 1911. In 1913, the whole of Southern Dobrudja was incorporated in Romania, but was returned to Bulgaria in 1940, when the area was visited once again by Petrov to examine the colonies of birds that nest there.

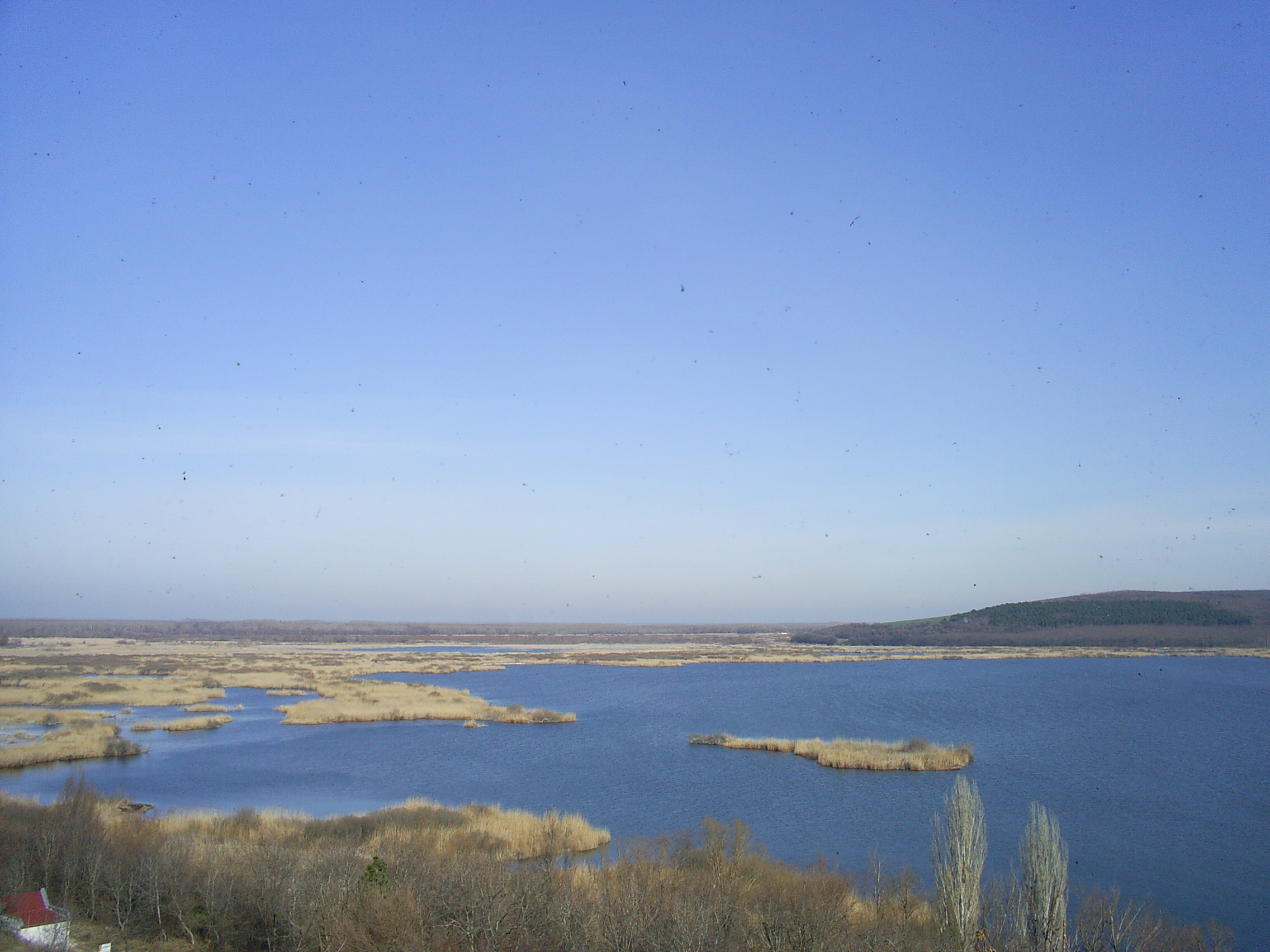
View towards the Srebarna reserve

The area was proclaimed a nature reserve in 1948 and is a Ramsar site since 1975. The reserve was recognized as World Natural Heritage Site under the 1972 Convention for the Protection of the World Cultural and Natural Heritage and included in the UNESCO World Heritage List in 1983.

== Legends ==
There are several legends about the origin of the lake's name. The one is about a khan named Srebrist, who died in the neighbourhood whilst engaging in an unequal battle with the Pechenegs. A second one tells about a boat full of silver (srebro in Bulgarian) along the shores of the lake. According to a third one, which is regarded as most plausible, the name comes from the silvery reflections on the lake's surface during full moon.

== Flora and Fauna ==
=== Flora ===
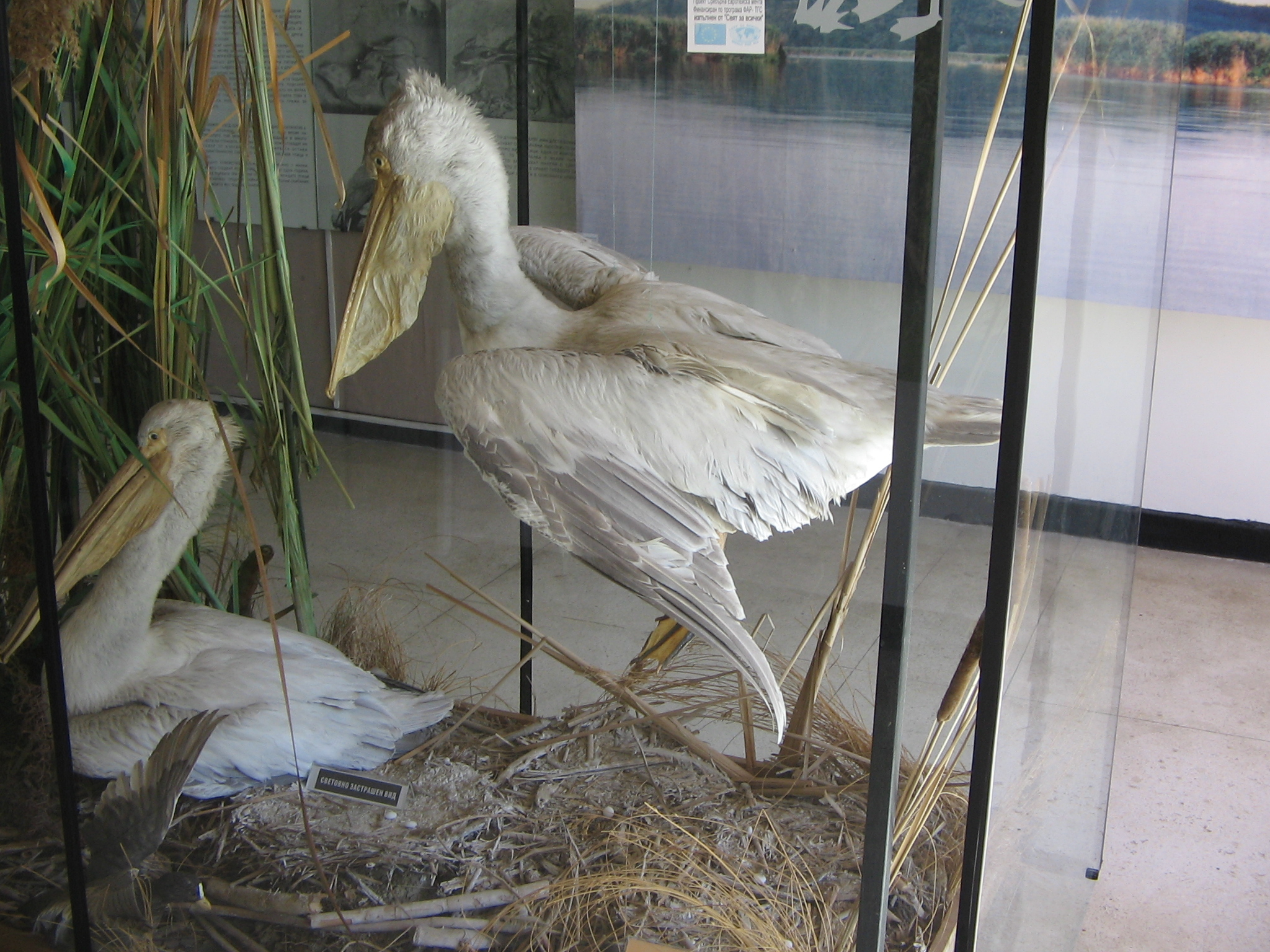
Pelicans in the museum

There are hydrophyte species such as reed in and around the lake. The reserve is home to 139 plant species, 11 of them are in danger of extinction outside the territory of Srebarna.

=== Fauna ===
A wide variety of fauna exists in the area. 39 mammal, 21 reptile and amphibian and 10 fish species inhabit the reserve, but it is most famous for the 179 bird species that nest on its territory. These species include multiple species of herons and cormorants, the glossy ibis, the Dalmatian pelican, the mute swan, the greylag goose, the marsh harrier and the bluethroat. Small mammals in the reserve include several shrew and mice species.

== Gallery ==
Gallery with 360° panorama pictures from the reserve

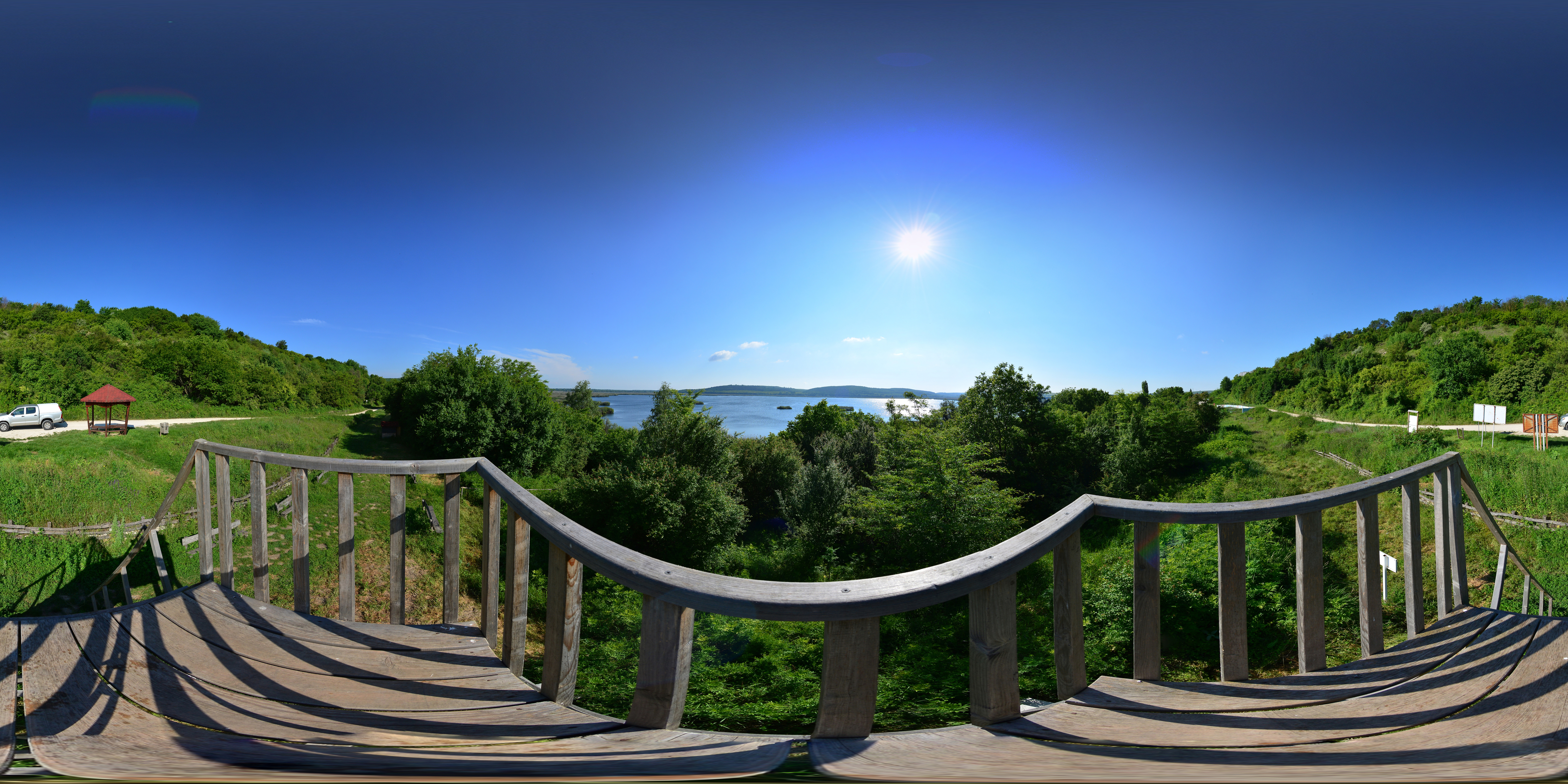

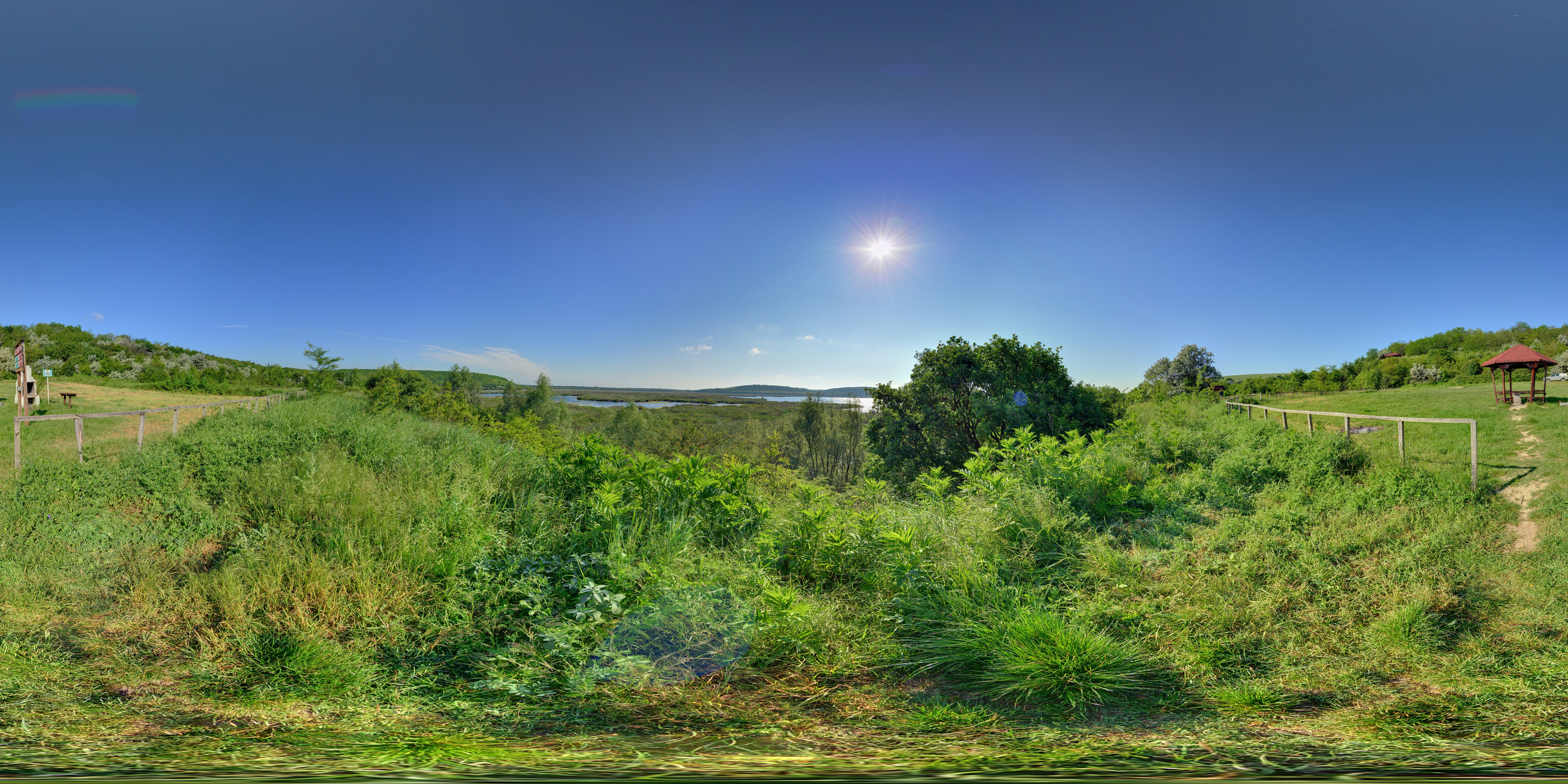

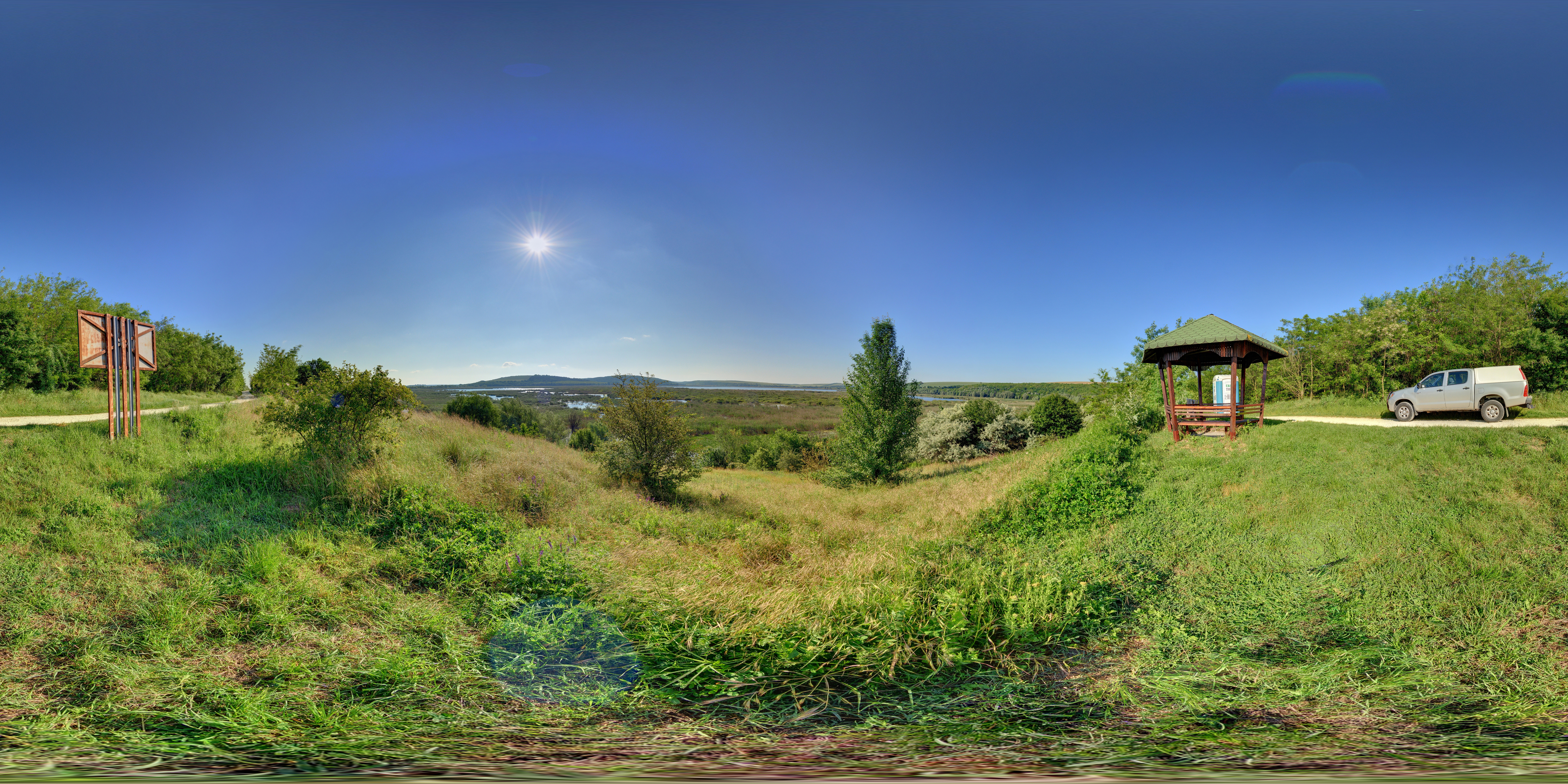

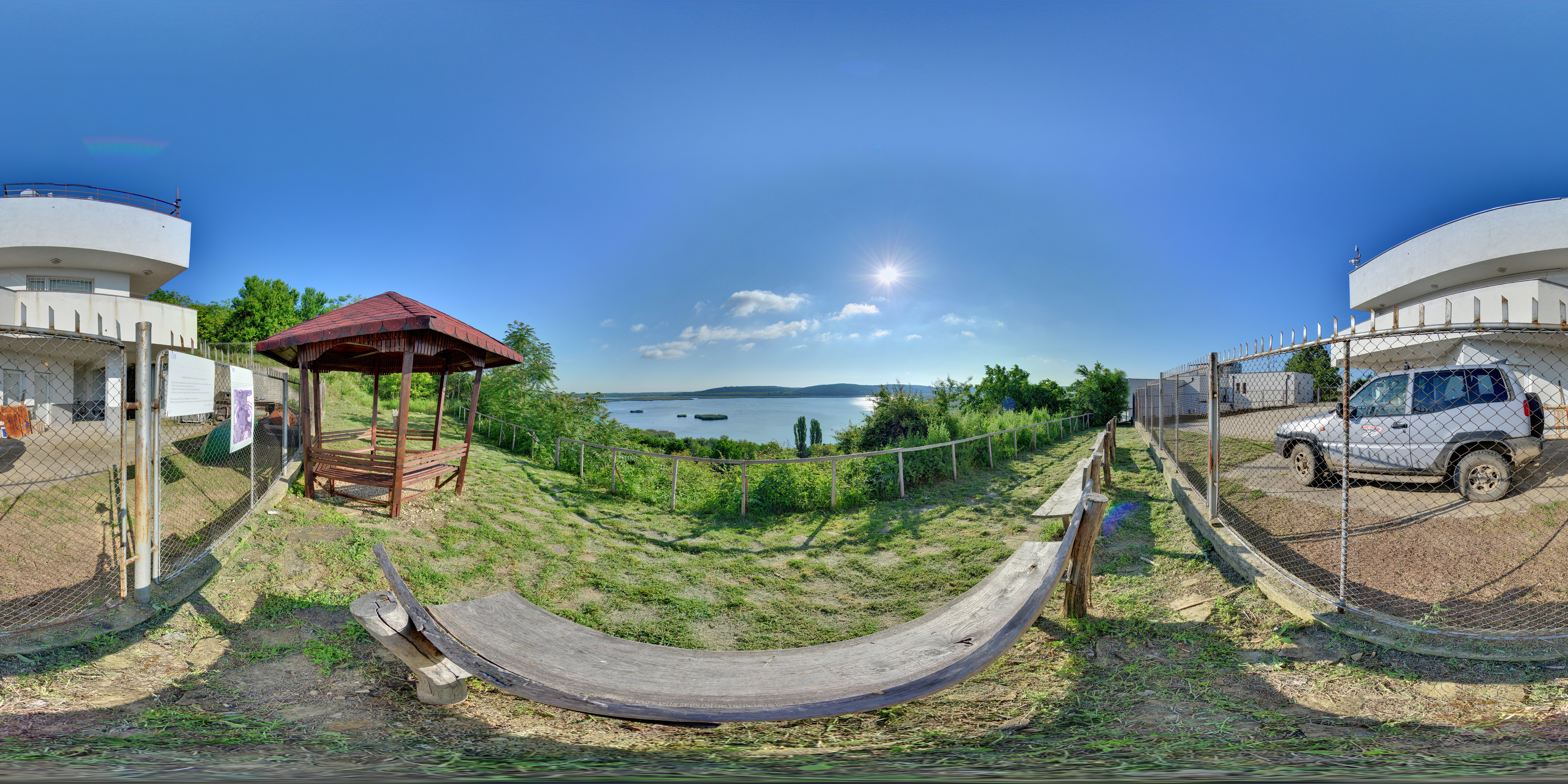

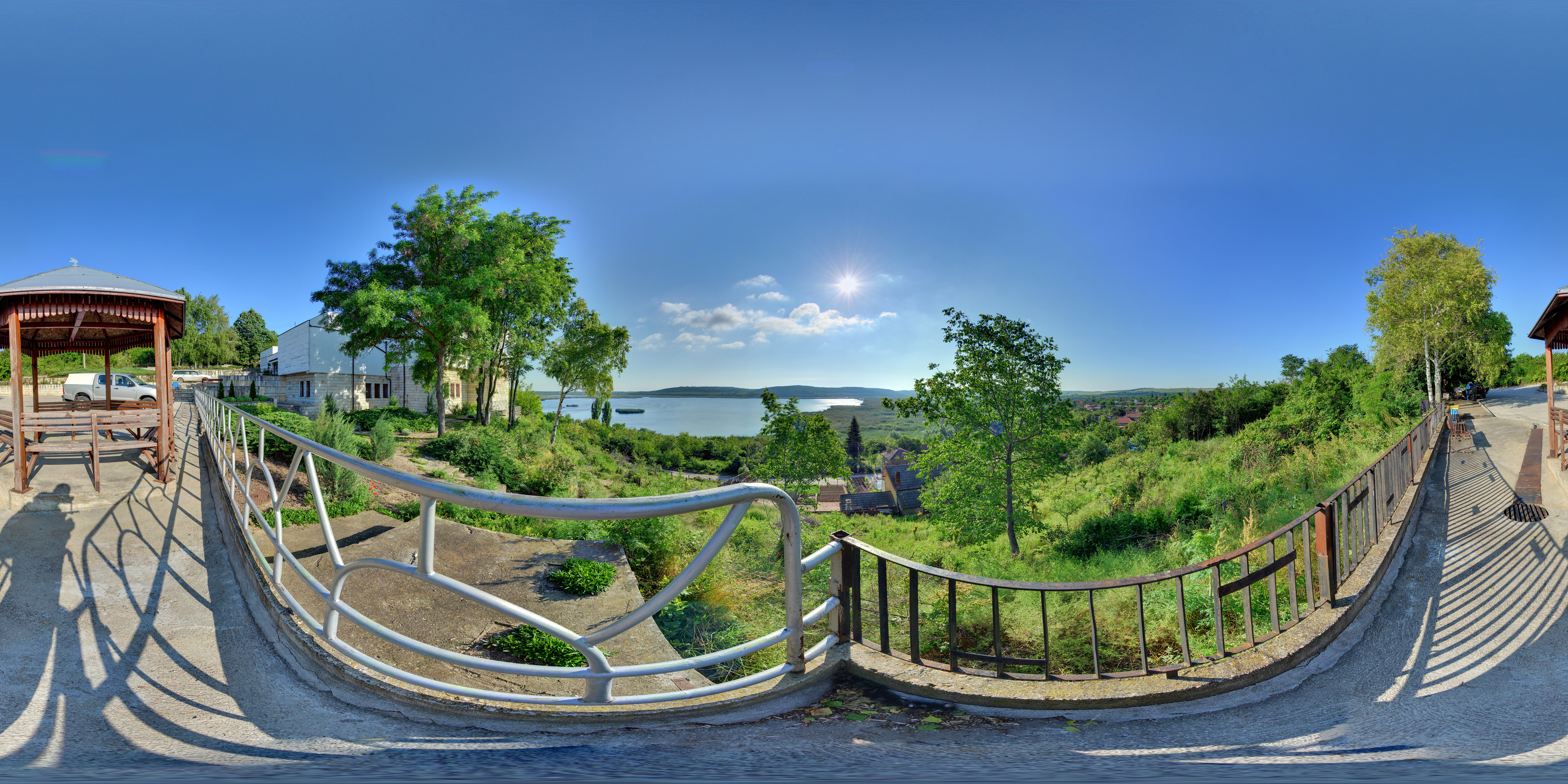

== Honour ==
Srebarna Glacier on Livingston Island in the South Shetland Islands, Antarctica is named after Srebarna.
