= Montecristo National Park =

National park in El Salvador

- IUCN category II (national park)
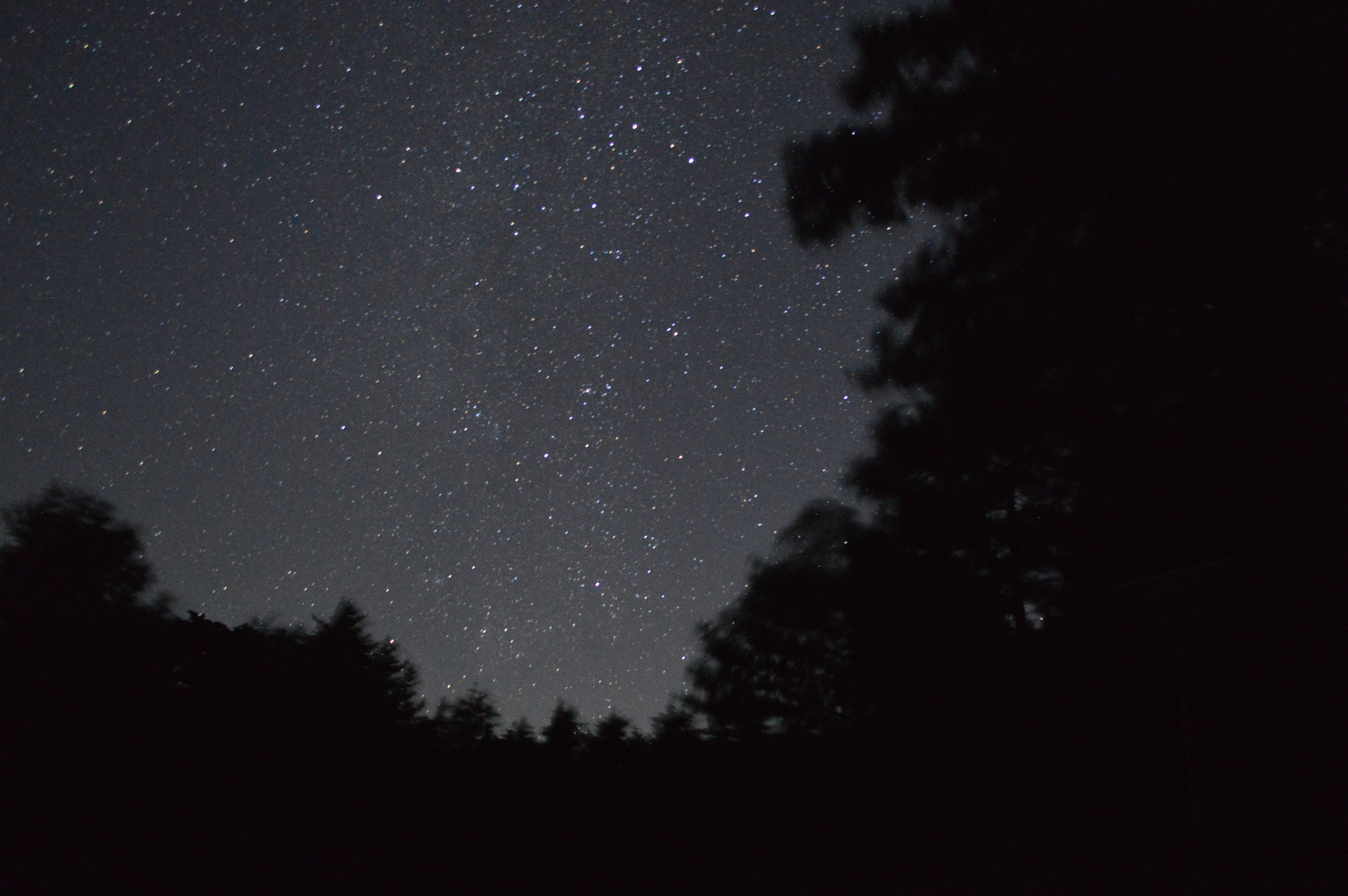
- Stars viewed from Montecristo National Park

- Location within El Salvador
- Location: El Salvador
- Nearest city: Metapán
- Coordinates: 14°26′31″N 89°19′32″W
- Area: 19.73 km^{2} (7.62 sq mi)
- Designation: national park
- Designated: 2008
- World Heritage site: Trifinio Fraternidad Transboundary Biosphere Reserve

Montecristo National Park is a large national park centered on the Montecristo cloud forest in Mesoamerica. Montecristo National Park is located in the north-western tip of El Salvador, a country in Central America known for its wildlife diversity.

It was founded in 2008, and covers an area of 19.73 km^{2}. The national park, together with Montecristo Trifinio National Park in Honduras and Trifinio Biosphere Reserve in Guatemala, form the Trifinio Fraternidad Transboundary Biosphere Reserve.

== Climate ==
Climate data for Planes de Montecristo, El Salvador (1981-2010)
Month	Jan	Feb	Mar	Apr	May	Jun	Jul	Aug	Sep	Oct	Nov	Dec	Year
Mean daily maximum °C (°F)	20.0 (68.0)	21.3 (70.3)	22.7 (72.9)	23.1 (73.6)	22.3 (72.1)	21.7 (71.1)	21.9 (71.4)	22.2 (72.0)	21.3 (70.3)	20.7 (69.3)	20.2 (68.4)	19.9 (67.8)	21.4 (70.6)
Daily mean °C (°F)	15.2 (59.4)	15.9 (60.6)	16.9 (62.4)	17.9 (64.2)	17.9 (64.2)	17.6 (63.7)	17.5 (63.5)	17.8 (64.0)	17.2 (63.0)	16.8 (62.2)	16.0 (60.8)	15.5 (59.9)	16.9 (62.3)
Mean daily minimum °C (°F)	10.3 (50.5)	10.5 (50.9)	11.2 (52.2)	12.6 (54.7)	13.6 (56.5)	13.6 (56.5)	13.2 (55.8)	13.4 (56.1)	13.1 (55.6)	12.8 (55.0)	11.9 (53.4)	11.1 (52.0)	12.3 (54.1)
Average rainfall mm (inches)	10 (0.4)	11 (0.4)	20 (0.8)	81 (3.2)	245 (9.6)	417 (16.4)	328 (12.9)	324 (12.8)	436 (17.2)	222 (8.7)	53 (2.1)	21 (0.8)	2,168 (85.3)
Average relative humidity (%)	65	63	62	61	71	79	76	77	82	77	70	66	71
Source: Ministerio de Medio Ambiente y Recursos Naturales
