= Montecristo Trifinio National Park =

National park in Honduras

- IUCN category II (national park)
- Location within Honduras
- Location: Honduras
- Coordinates: 14°26′31″N 89°19′32″W
- Area: 54 km^{2} (21 sq mi)
- Established: 1 January 1987

Montecristo Trifinio National Park is a national park in Honduras. It was established on 1 January 1987 and covers an area of 54 square kilometres.

The Montecristo massif is an area where the borders of Honduras, Guatemala and El Salvador meet, and its protection was a joint initiative of these three countries, which resulted in the creation of the national parks in Honduras and El Salvador, as well as the Guatemalan Trifinio Biosphere Reserve.
