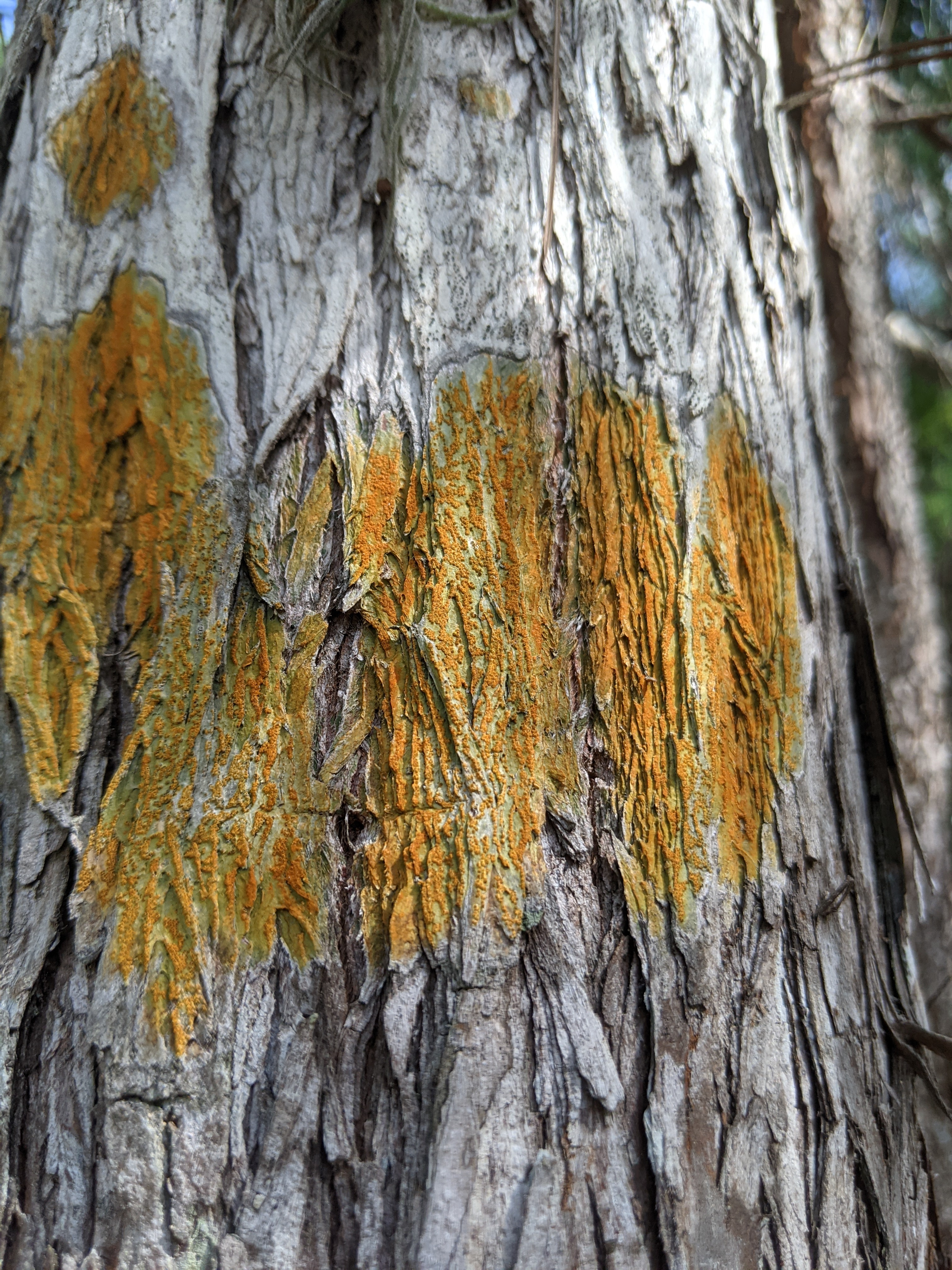
- in Florida

Scientific classification
- Domain: Eukaryota
- Kingdom: Fungi
- Division: Ascomycota
- Class: Dothideomycetes
- Order: Trypetheliales
- Family: Trypetheliaceae
- Genus: Astrothelium
- Species: A. aeneum

Binomial name
- Astrothelium aeneum (Vain.) Aptroot & Lücking (2016)

Synonyms
- Verrucaria aenea Eschw. (1834); Pseudopyrenula aenea Vain. (1890); Trypethelium aeneum (Vain.) Zahlbr. (1903)

= Astrothelium aeneum =

Species of lichen

Astrothelium aeneum is a species of corticolous (bark-dwelling), crustose lichen in the family Trypetheliaceae. It is widely distributed in tropical regions. The lichen's thallus is typically light olive-green to yellowish, often covered in orange pigment, and varies in texture from smooth to uneven. It fluoresces red under ultraviolet light.

== Taxonomy ==
The species was first described by Franz Gerhard Eschweiler in 1834, with the name Verrucaria aenea. However, this name was not validly published, because it is a later homonym of a name already published by Karl Friedrich Wilhelm Wallroth in 1831 and thus unavailable for use according to the rules of botanical nomenclature. The first valid publication of a name for the species was by Finnish lichenologist Edvard August Vainio, who named it Pseudopyrenula aenea in 1890. André Aptroot and Robert Lücking transferred it to the genus Astrothelium in 2016 following a large-scale reorganisation of the Trypetheliaceae based on molecular phylogenetics.

== Description ==
Astrothelium aeneum has a corticate (having a cortex-like structure) thallus, which typically appears as a light olive-green to yellowish colouration. Much of its surface is often covered with a distinctive orange pigment. The texture of the thallus ranges from smooth to uneven.

The ascomata, or spore-producing structures, are of the trypethelioid type, characterised by their apical ostioles (small openings). These ascomata are generally found either solitarily, irregularly merging with each other, or spreading diffusely in a pseudostromatic pattern. Their size varies from 0.3 to 0.7 mm in diameter. They are erumpent, meaning they break through the thallus, and are covered by both the thallus and orange pigment, except for the darker area around the ostioles. The hamathecium, the supportive tissue structure containing the asci, is clear.

Each ascus typically contains eight ascospores. These spores are fusiform (spindle-shaped), with a size range of 20–27 μm in length and 7–10 μm in width. They are hyaline (translucent) and have three septa (internal partitions). They do not react to staining with iodine (IKI−).

Chemically, both the thallus and ascomata of Astrothelium aeneum react to ultraviolet light by fluorescing red (UV+ red) and produce a purple reaction when treated with potassium hydroxide (K+ purple). This is indicative of the presence of an anthraquinone, a type of chemical compound.

== Distribution ==
Astrothelium aeneum is found in a wide range of tropical regions globally. Its presence has been recorded in various countries including the United States, Costa Rica, El Salvador, the Revillagigedo Islands, the Bahamas, Cuba, Jamaica, Colombia, Venezuela, Guyana, Suriname, French Guiana, the Galápagos Islands, Bolivia, Brazil, Sri Lanka, Thailand, and Malaysia (specifically in Sarawak and Sabah). Additionally, it is found in Papua New Guinea and Australia.
