= List of ultras of Central America =

The following sortable table comprises the 23 ultra-prominent summits of Central America. Each of these peaks has at least 1500 meters (4921 feet) of topographic prominence. This article defines Central America as the seven nations of Belize, Costa Rica, El Salvador, Guatemala, Honduras, Nicaragua, and Panamá.

The summit of a mountain or hill may be measured in three principal ways:

1. The topographic elevation of a summit measures the height of the summit above a geodetic sea level.
2. The topographic prominence of a summit is a measure of how high the summit rises above its surroundings.
3. The topographic isolation (or radius of dominance) of a summit measures how far the summit lies from its nearest point of equal elevation.

== Ultra-prominent summits ==
Of these 23 ultra-prominent summits of Central America, eight are located in Honduras, six in Guatemala, four in El Salvador, three in Costa Rica, two in Nicaragua, and one in Panamá. Cerro El Pital straddles the border between El Salvador and Honduras.

The 23 ultra-prominent summits of Central America
Rank	Mountain Peak	Nation	Mountain Range	Elevation	Prominence	Isolation	Location
1	Volcán Tajumulco (Note: The summit of Volcán Tajumulco is the highest point of the Sierra de las Nubes, the Republic of Guatemala, and all of Central America.) (Note: Volcán Tajumulco is the southernmost and easternmost 4000-meter (13,123-foot) summit of greater North America.)	Guatemala	Sierra de las Nubes	4220 m 13,845 ft	3990 m 13,091 ft	722 km 448 mi	15.0430°N 91.9037°W
2	Chirripó Grande (Note: The summit of Chirripó Grande is the highest point of the Republic of Costa Rica.) (Note: Chirripó Grande is the southernmost and easternmost summit of its elevation in Central America and greater North America.) (Cerro Chirripó)	Costa Rica	Cordillera de Talamanca	3819 m 12,530 ft	3755 m 12,320 ft	878 km 546 mi	9.4843°N 83.4889°W
3	Montaña de Santa Bárbara	Honduras	Santa Bárbara	2744 m 9,003 ft	2084 m 6,837 ft	74 km 46 mi	14.9137°N 88.1145°W
4	Cerro Las Minas (Note: The summit of Cerro Las Minas is the highest point of the Republic of Honduras.)	Honduras	Sierra de las Nubes	2849 m 9,347 ft	2069 m 6,788 ft	132 km 82 mi	14.5340°N 88.6804°W
5	Volcán de Agua	Guatemala	Escuintla	3761 m 12,339 ft	1981 m 6,499 ft	14.86 km 9.23 mi	14.4654°N 90.7428°W
6	Volcán Irazú	Costa Rica	Cordillera Central, Costa Rica	3432 m 11,260 ft	1897 m 6,224 ft	47.8 km 29.7 mi	9.9764°N 83.8534°W
7	Alto Cuchumatanes (Note: Alto Cuchumatanes is the northernmost 3000-meter (9843-foot) summit of Central America.)	Guatemala	Huehuetenango	3837 m 12,589 ft	1877 m 6,158 ft	65.2 km 40.5 mi	15.5182°N 91.5445°W
8	Montañas Peña Blanca	Guatemala	Sierra Madre de Chiapas	3518 m 11,542 ft	1858 m 6,096 ft	39.8 km 24.7 mi	15.4996°N 91.9151°W
9	Volcán Acatenango (Note: Volcán Acatenango is the southernmost and easternmost summit of its elevation in Central America and greater North America.)	Guatemala	Chimaltenango	3975 m 13,041 ft	1835 m 6,020 ft	125.9 km 78.2 mi	14.5016°N 90.8755°W
10	Volcán San Miguel	El Salvador	Sierra Madre de Chiapas	2131 m 6,991 ft	1831 m 6,007 ft	64.1 km 39.8 mi	13.4348°N 88.2691°W
11	Cerro Tacarcuna (Note: Cerro Tacarcuna is the southernmost ultra-prominent summit of Central America and greater North America.)	Panama	Darién	1875 m 6,152 ft	1770 m 5,807 ft	174.4 km 108.3 mi	8.1659°N 77.2959°W
12	Volcán Atitlán	Guatemala	Sierra Madre de Chiapas	3537 m 11,604 ft	1754 m 5,755 ft	33.2 km 20.6 mi	14.5834°N 91.1864°W
13	Pico Bonito (Note: Pico Bonito is the northernmost 2000-meter (6562-foot) summit of Central America.)	Honduras	Cordillera Nombre de Dios	2450 m 8,038 ft	1710 m 5,610 ft	151 km 93.8 mi	15.5575°N 86.8756°W
14	Montaña San Ildefonso	Honduras	Cortés	2242 m 7,356 ft	1702 m 5,584 ft	68.6 km 42.7 mi	15.5167°N 88.2333°W
15	Volcán San Cristóbal	Nicaragua	Cordillera Los Maribios	1745 m 5,725 ft	1665 m 5,463 ft	134.5 km 83.6 mi	12.7026°N 87.0057°W
16	Volcán de Santa Ana	El Salvador	Sierra Madre de Chiapas	2362 m 7,749 ft	1602 m 5,256 ft	69.1 km 42.9 mi	13.8557°N 89.6288°W
17	Volcán Concepción	Nicaragua	Rivas	1610 m 5,282 ft	1579 m 5,180 ft	69.6 km 43.3 mi	11.5380°N 85.6226°W
18	Pico Pijol	Honduras	Yoro	2320 m 7,612 ft	1578 m 5,177 ft	65.1 km 40.4 mi	15.1833°N 87.5667°W
19	Volcán de San Vicente	El Salvador	Sierra Madre de Chiapas	2182 m 7,159 ft	1562 m 5,125 ft	90.3 km 56.1 mi	13.5965°N 88.8376°W
20	Cerro El Pital (Note: Cerro El Pital on the international border with Honduras is the highest point of the Republic of El Salvador.)	El Salvador; Honduras	Sierra de las Nubes	2730 m 8,957 ft	1530 m 5,020 ft	51.1 km 31.8 mi	14.3844°N 89.1292°W
21	Volcán Miravalles	Costa Rica	Cordillera de Guanacaste	2028 m 6,654 ft	1528 m 5,013 ft	99.4 km 61.8 mi	10.7469°N 85.1505°W
22	Montaña los Comayagua	Honduras	Comayagua	2407 m 7,897 ft	1507 m 4,944 ft	80.1 km 49.7 mi	14.5000°N 87.5000°W
23	Sierra de Agalta high point	Honduras	Sierra de Agalta	2335 m 7,661 ft	1505 m 4,938 ft	122.6 km 76.1 mi	14.9576°N 85.9165°W

== Gallery ==
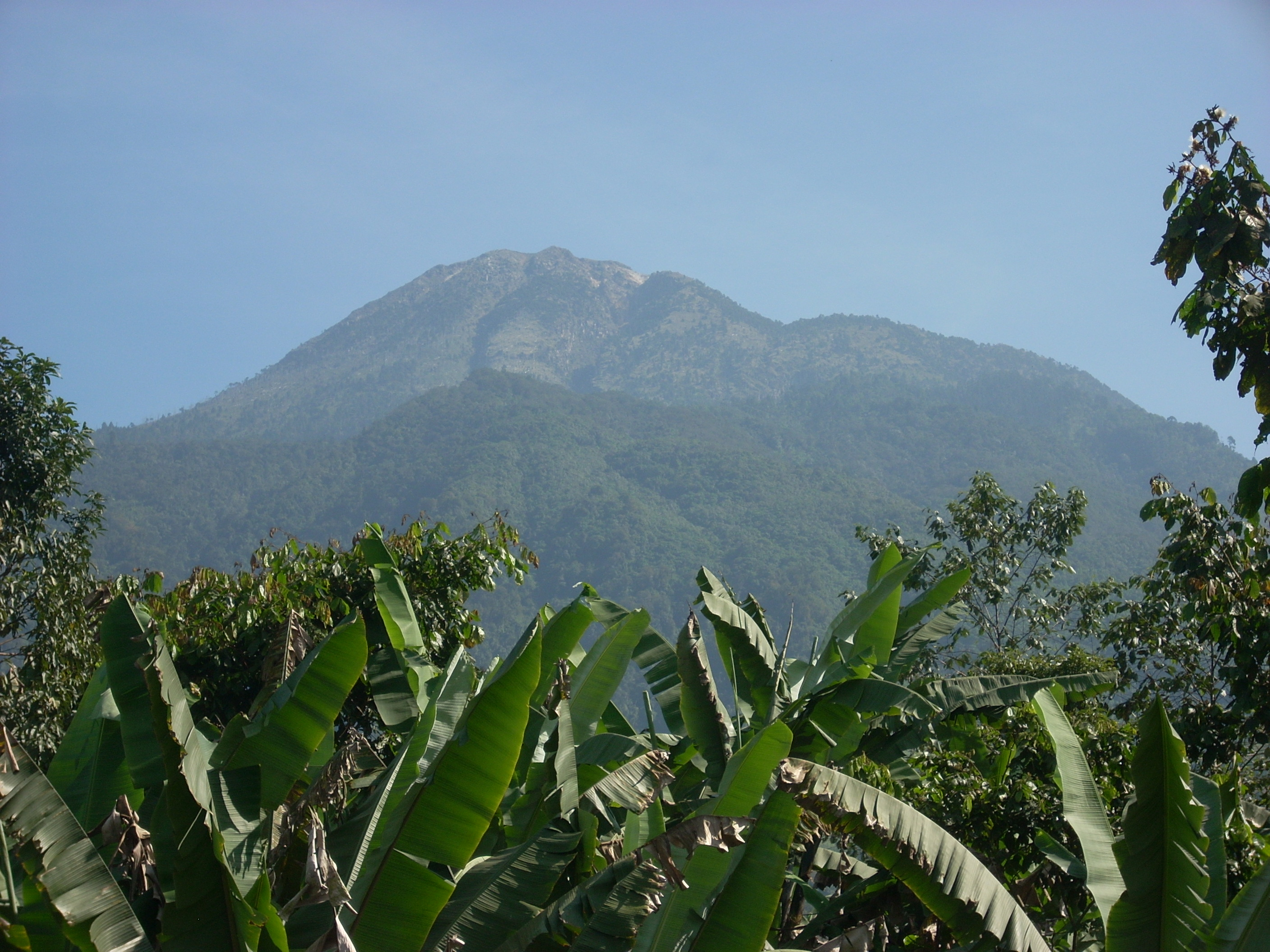
1. Volcán Tajumulco is the highest summit of Guatemala and all of Central America.

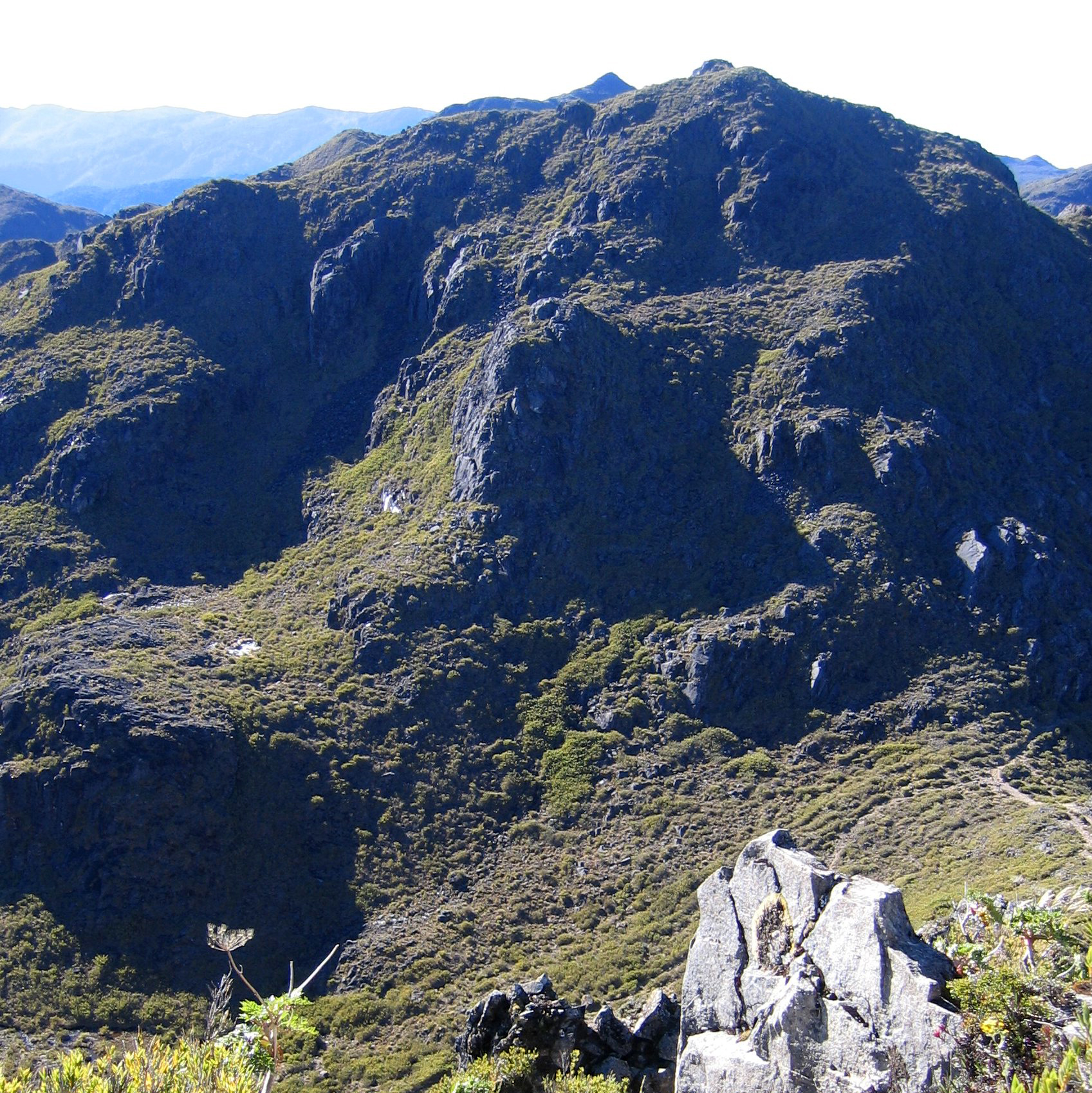
2. Chirripó Grande is the highest summit of Costa Rica.

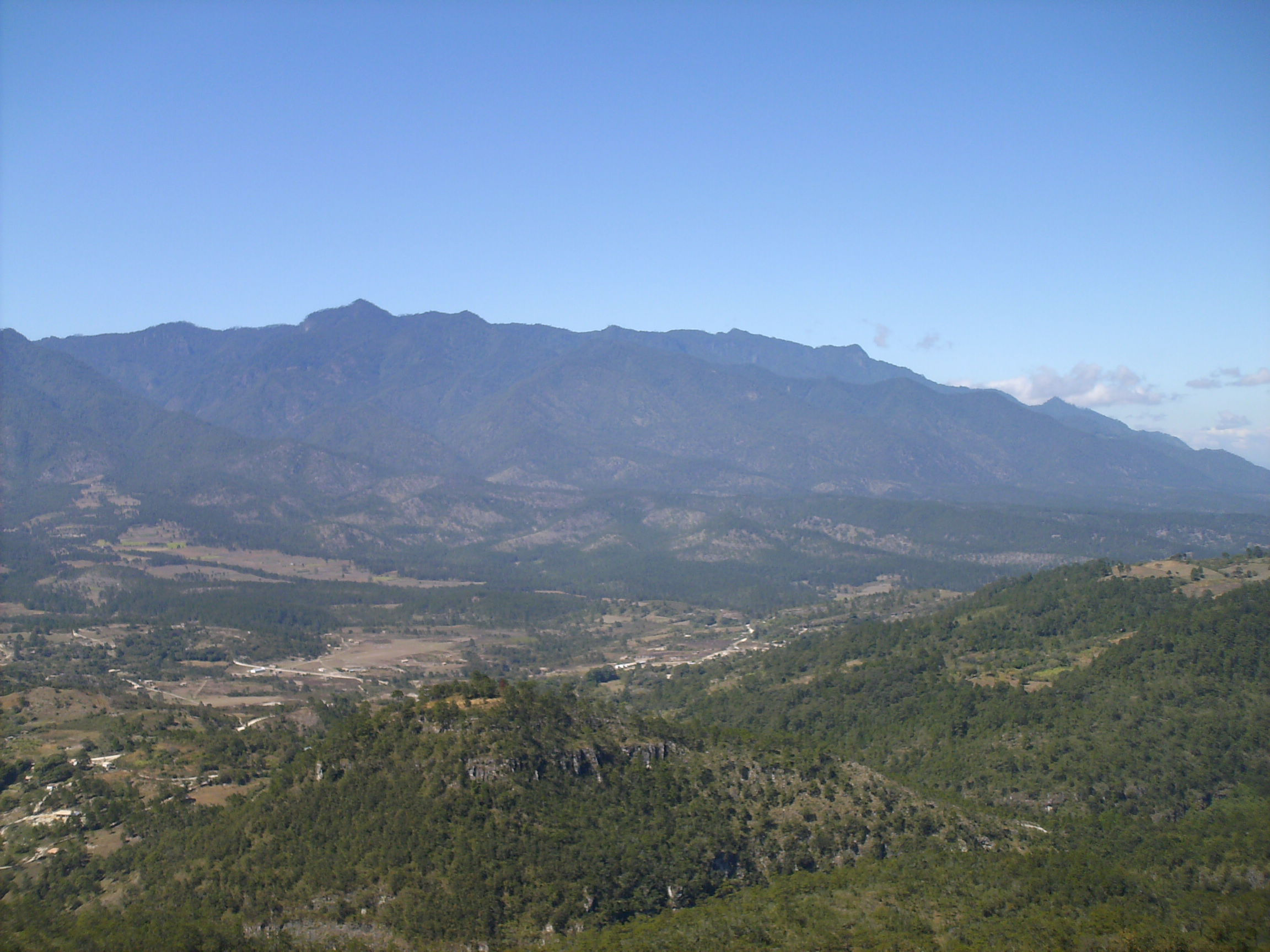
4. Cerro Las Minas is the highest summit of Honduras.

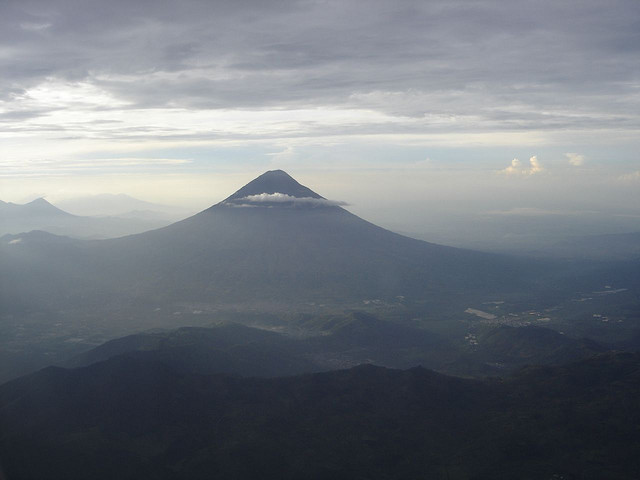
5. Volcan de Agua in Guatemala.

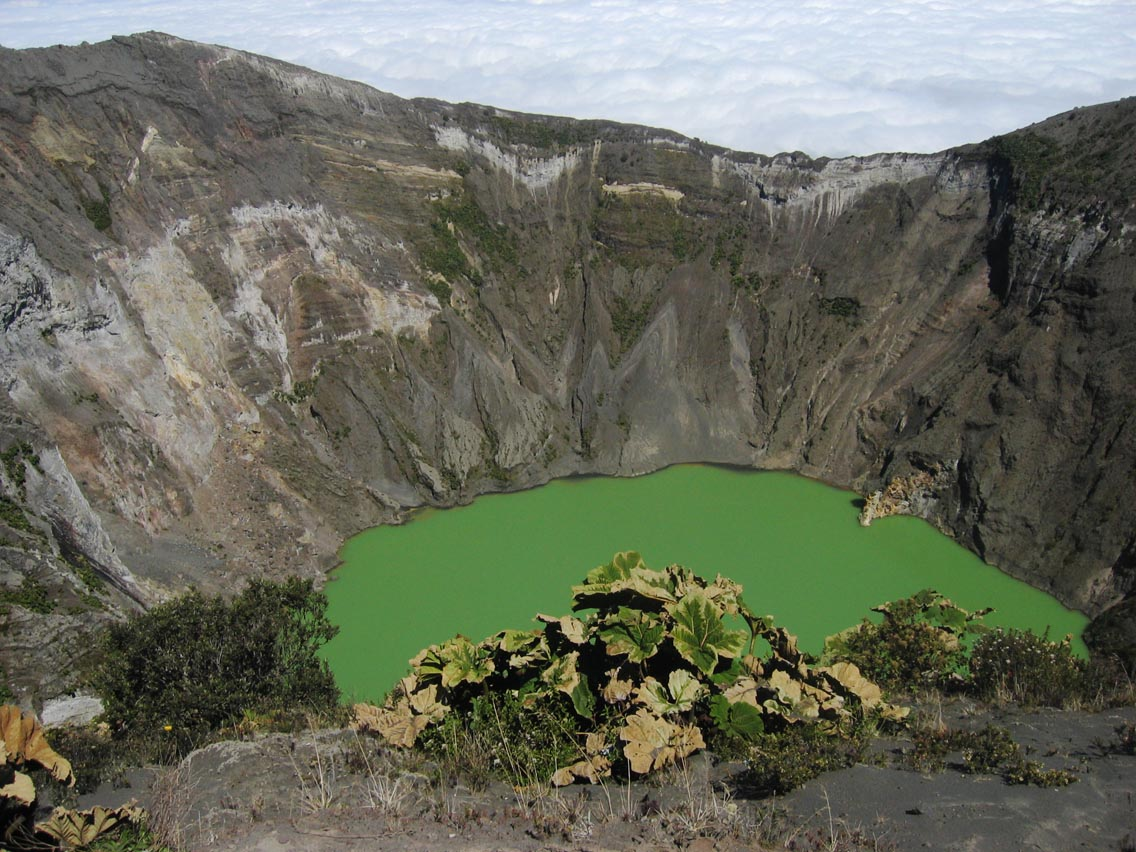
6. Volcán Irazú in Costa Rica.

== See also ==
- List of mountain peaks of North America
  - List of mountain peaks of Greenland
  - List of mountain peaks of Canada
  - List of mountain peaks of the Rocky Mountains
  - List of mountain peaks of the United States
  - List of mountain peaks of México
  - List of mountain peaks of Central America
    - List of the ultra-prominent summits of Central America
    - List of extreme summits of Central America
  - List of mountain peaks of the Caribbean
- Central America
  - Geography of Central America
  - Geology of Central America
    - Category:Mountains of Central America
      - commons:Category:Mountains of Central America
- Physical geography
  - Topography
    - Topographic elevation
    - Topographic prominence
    - Topographic isolation
