= List of mountain peaks of Central America =

Article comprises three sortable tables of major mountain peaks of Central America. This article defines Central America as the seven nations of Belize, Costa Rica, El Salvador, Guatemala, Honduras, Nicaragua, and Panama.

The summit of a mountain or hill may be measured in three principal ways:

1. The topographic elevation of a summit measures the height of the summit above a geodetic sea level. The first table below ranks the 25 highest major summits of Central America by elevation.
2. The topographic prominence of a summit is a measure of how high the summit rises above its surroundings. The second table below ranks the 25 most prominent summits of Central America.
3. The topographic isolation (or radius of dominance) of a summit measures how far the summit lies from its nearest point of equal elevation. The third table below ranks the 25 most isolated major summits of Central America.

== Highest major summits ==
Of the 25 highest major summits of Central America, Volcán Tajumulco and Volcán Tacaná exceed 4000 meters (13,123 feet) elevation, 11 peaks exceed 3000 meters (9843 feet), and 24 peaks exceed 2000 meters (6562 feet) elevation.

Of these 25 peaks, nine are located in Honduras, eight in Guatemala, four in El Salvador, three in Costa Rica, two in Panama, and one in Nicaragua. Volcán Tacaná lies on the Guatemala-Mexico border, Cerro El Pital lies on the El Salvador-Honduras border, and Pico Mogotón lies on the Nicaragua-Honduras border.

The 25 highest summits of Central America with at least 500 meters of topographic prominence
Rank	Mountain peak	Country	Mountain range	Elevation	Prominence	Isolation	Location
1	Volcán Tajumulco (Note: The summit of Volcán Tajumulco is the highest point of the Sierra de las Nubes, the Republic of Guatemala, and all of Central America.) (Note: Volcán Tajumulco is the southernmost and easternmost 4000-meter (13,123-foot) summit of greater North America.)	Guatemala	Sierra de las Nubes	4220 m 13,845 ft	3990 m 13,091 ft	722 km 448 mi	15.0430°N 91.9037°W
2	Volcán Tacaná (Note: Volcán Tacaná on the international border with Guatemala is the highest point of Estado Libre y Soberano de Chiapas.)	Chiapas; Guatemala	Sierra de Istatan	4067 m 13,343 ft	1037 m 3,402 ft	24.1 km 14.99 mi	15.1323°N 92.1084°W
3	Volcán Acatenango (Note: Volcán Acatenango is the southernmost and easternmost summit of its elevation in Central America and greater North America.)	Guatemala	Chimaltenango	3975 m 13,041 ft	1835 m 6,020 ft	125.9 km 78.2 mi	14.5016°N 90.8755°W
4	Alto Cuchumatanes (Note: Alto Cuchumatanes is the northernmost 3000-meter (9843-foot) summit of Central America.)	Guatemala	Huehuetenango	3837 m 12,589 ft	1877 m 6,158 ft	65.2 km 40.5 mi	15.5182°N 91.5445°W
5	Chirripó Grande (Note: The summit of Chirripó Grande is the highest point of the Republic of Costa Rica.) (Note: Chirripó Grande is the southernmost and easternmost summit of its elevation in Central America and greater North America.) (Cerro Chirripó)	Costa Rica	Cordillera de Talamanca	3819 m 12,530 ft	3755 m 12,320 ft	878 km 546 mi	9.4843°N 83.4889°W
6	Volcán Santa María	Guatemala	Sierra Madre	3772 m 12,375 ft	1054 m 3,458 ft	49.4 km 30.7 mi	14.7570°N 91.5517°W
7	Volcán de Agua	Guatemala	Escuintla	3761 m 12,339 ft	1981 m 6,499 ft	14.86 km 9.23 mi	14.4654°N 90.7428°W
8	Volcán Atitlán	Guatemala	Sierra Madre de Chiapas	3537 m 11,604 ft	1754 m 5,755 ft	33.2 km 20.6 mi	14.5834°N 91.1864°W
9	ceb:Peña Blanca Mountains	Guatemala	Sierra Madre de Chiapas	3518 m 11,542 ft	1858 m 6,096 ft	39.8 km 24.7 mi	15.4996°N 91.9151°W
10	Volcán Barú (Note: The summit of Volcán Barú is the highest point of the Republic of Panama.) (Note: Volcán Barú is the southernmost 3000-meter (9843-foot) summit of Central America and greater North America.)	Panama	Cordillera de Talamanca	3474 m 11,398 ft	1324 m 4,344 ft	74.2 km 46.1 mi	8.8088°N 82.5427°W
11	Volcán Irazú	Costa Rica	Cordillera Central, Costa Rica	3432 m 11,260 ft	1897 m 6,224 ft	47.8 km 29.7 mi	9.9764°N 83.8534°W
12	Cerro Las Minas (Note: The summit of Cerro Las Minas is the highest point of the Republic of Honduras.)	Honduras	Sierra de las Nubes	2849 m 9,347 ft	2069 m 6,788 ft	132 km 82 mi	14.5340°N 88.6804°W
13	Montaña de Santa Bárbara	Honduras	Santa Bárbara	2744 m 9,003 ft	2084 m 6,837 ft	74 km 46 mi	14.9137°N 88.1145°W
14	Cerro El Pital (Note: Cerro El Pital on the international border with Honduras is the highest point of the Republic of El Salvador.)	El Salvador; Honduras	Sierra de las Nubes	2730 m 8,957 ft	1530 m 5,020 ft	51.1 km 31.8 mi	14.3844°N 89.1292°W
15	Pico Bonito (Note: Pico Bonito is the northernmost 2000-meter (6562-foot) summit of Central America.)	Honduras	ceb:Cordillera Nombre de Dios	2450 m 8,038 ft	1710 m 5,610 ft	151 km 93.8 mi	15.5575°N 86.8756°W
16	ceb:Montaña los Comayagua	Honduras	Comayagua	2407 m 7,897 ft	1507 m 4,944 ft	80.1 km 49.7 mi	14.5000°N 87.5000°W
17	Volcán de Santa Ana	El Salvador	Sierra Madre de Chiapas	2362 m 7,749 ft	1602 m 5,256 ft	69.1 km 42.9 mi	13.8557°N 89.6288°W
18	Sierra de Agalta high point	Honduras	Sierra de Agalta	2335 m 7,661 ft	1505 m 4,938 ft	122.6 km 76.1 mi	14.9576°N 85.9165°W
19	ceb:Pico Pijol	Honduras	Yoro	2320 m 7,612 ft	1578 m 5,177 ft	65.1 km 40.4 mi	15.1833°N 87.5667°W
20	ceb:Cerro San Ildefonso (bukid sa Peru)	Honduras	Cortés	2242 m 7,356 ft	1702 m 5,584 ft	68.6 km 42.7 mi	15.5167°N 88.2333°W
21	Volcán de San Vicente	El Salvador	Sierra Madre de Chiapas	2182 m 7,159 ft	1562 m 5,125 ft	90.3 km 56.1 mi	13.5965°N 88.8376°W
22	Volcán San Miguel	El Salvador	Sierra Madre de Chiapas	2131 m 6,991 ft	1831 m 6,007 ft	64.1 km 39.8 mi	13.4348°N 88.2691°W
23	Pico Mogotón (Note: Pico Mogotón on the international border with Honduras is the highest point of the Republic of Nicaragua.)	Nicaragua; Honduras	Sierra de las Nubes	2106 m 6,909 ft	1321 m 4,334 ft	142 km 88.2 mi	13.7631°N 86.3983°W
24	Volcán Miravalles	Costa Rica	Cordillera de Guanacaste	2028 m 6,654 ft	1528 m 5,013 ft	99.4 km 61.8 mi	10.7469°N 85.1505°W
25	Cerro Tacarcuna (Note: Cerro Tacarcuna is the southernmost ultra-prominent summit of Central America and greater North America.)	Panama	Darién	1875 m 6,152 ft	1770 m 5,807 ft	174.4 km 108.3 mi	8.1659°N 77.2959°W

== Most prominent summits ==
Of the 25 most prominent summits of Central America, Volcán Tajumulco and Chirripó Grande exceed 3000 meters (9843 feet) of topographic prominence, four peaks exceed 2000 meters (6562 feet), and 23 peaks are ultra-prominent summits with at least 1500 meters (4921 feet) of topographic prominence.

Of these 25 peaks, eight are located in Honduras, five in Guatemala, four in El Salvador, three in Costa Rica, three in Nicaragua, and two in Panama. Cerro El Pital lies on the El Salvador-Honduras border and Pico Mogotón lies on the Nicaragua-Honduras border.

The 25 most topographically prominent summits of Central America
Rank	Mountain peak	Country	Mountain range	Elevation	Prominence	Isolation	Location
1	Volcán Tajumulco	Guatemala	Sierra de las Nubes	4220 m 13,845 ft	3990 m 13,091 ft	722 km 448 mi	15.0430°N 91.9037°W
2	Chirripó Grande (Cerro Chirripó)	Costa Rica	Cordillera de Talamanca	3819 m 12,530 ft	3755 m 12,320 ft	878 km 546 mi	9.4843°N 83.4889°W
3	Montaña de Santa Bárbara	Honduras	Santa Bárbara	2744 m 9,003 ft	2084 m 6,837 ft	74 km 46 mi	14.9137°N 88.1145°W
4	Cerro Las Minas	Honduras	Sierra de las Nubes	2849 m 9,347 ft	2069 m 6,788 ft	132 km 82 mi	14.5340°N 88.6804°W
5	Volcán de Agua	Guatemala	Escuintla	3761 m 12,339 ft	1981 m 6,499 ft	14.86 km 9.23 mi	14.4654°N 90.7428°W
6	Volcán Irazú	Costa Rica	Cordillera Central, Costa Rica	3432 m 11,260 ft	1897 m 6,224 ft	47.8 km 29.7 mi	9.9764°N 83.8534°W
7	Alto Cuchumatanes	Guatemala	Huehuetenango	3837 m 12,589 ft	1877 m 6,158 ft	65.2 km 40.5 mi	15.5182°N 91.5445°W
8	ceb:Peña Blanca Mountains	Guatemala	Sierra Madre de Chiapas	3518 m 11,542 ft	1858 m 6,096 ft	39.8 km 24.7 mi	15.4996°N 91.9151°W
9	Volcán Acatenango	Guatemala	Chimaltenango	3975 m 13,041 ft	1835 m 6,020 ft	125.9 km 78.2 mi	14.5016°N 90.8755°W
10	Volcán San Miguel	El Salvador	Sierra Madre de Chiapas	2131 m 6,991 ft	1831 m 6,007 ft	64.1 km 39.8 mi	13.4348°N 88.2691°W
11	Cerro Tacarcuna	Panama	Darién	1875 m 6,152 ft	1770 m 5,807 ft	174.4 km 108.3 mi	8.1659°N 77.2959°W
12	Volcán Atitlán	Guatemala	Sierra Madre de Chiapas	3537 m 11,604 ft	1754 m 5,755 ft	33.2 km 20.6 mi	14.5834°N 91.1864°W
13	Pico Bonito	Honduras	ceb:Cordillera Nombre de Dios	2450 m 8,038 ft	1710 m 5,610 ft	151 km 93.8 mi	15.5575°N 86.8756°W
14	ceb:Cerro San Ildefonso (bukid sa Peru)	Honduras	Cortés	2242 m 7,356 ft	1702 m 5,584 ft	68.6 km 42.7 mi	15.5167°N 88.2333°W
15	Volcán San Cristóbal	Nicaragua	Cordillera Los Maribios	1745 m 5,725 ft	1665 m 5,463 ft	134.5 km 83.6 mi	12.7026°N 87.0057°W
16	Volcán de Santa Ana	El Salvador	Sierra Madre de Chiapas	2362 m 7,749 ft	1602 m 5,256 ft	69.1 km 42.9 mi	13.8557°N 89.6288°W
17	Volcán Concepción	Nicaragua	Rivas	1610 m 5,282 ft	1579 m 5,180 ft	69.6 km 43.3 mi	11.5380°N 85.6226°W
18	ceb:Pico Pijol	Honduras	Yoro	2320 m 7,612 ft	1578 m 5,177 ft	65.1 km 40.4 mi	15.1833°N 87.5667°W
19	Volcán de San Vicente	El Salvador	Sierra Madre de Chiapas	2182 m 7,159 ft	1562 m 5,125 ft	90.3 km 56.1 mi	13.5965°N 88.8376°W
20	Cerro El Pital	El Salvador; Honduras	Sierra de las Nubes	2730 m 8,957 ft	1530 m 5,020 ft	51.1 km 31.8 mi	14.3844°N 89.1292°W
21	Volcán Miravalles	Costa Rica	Cordillera de Guanacaste	2028 m 6,654 ft	1528 m 5,013 ft	99.4 km 61.8 mi	10.7469°N 85.1505°W
22	ceb:Montaña los Comayagua	Honduras	Comayagua	2407 m 7,897 ft	1507 m 4,944 ft	80.1 km 49.7 mi	14.5000°N 87.5000°W
23	Sierra de Agalta high point	Honduras	Sierra de Agalta	2335 m 7,661 ft	1505 m 4,938 ft	122.6 km 76.1 mi	14.9576°N 85.9165°W
24	Volcán Barú	Panama	Chiriquí	3474 m 11,398 ft	1324 m 4,344 ft	74.2 km 46.1 mi	8.8088°N 82.5427°W
25	Pico Mogotón	Nicaragua; Honduras	Sierra de las Nubes	2106 m 6,909 ft	1321 m 4,334 ft	142 km 88.2 mi	13.7631°N 86.3983°W

== Most isolated major summits ==
Of the 25 most isolated major summits of Central America, Chirripó Grande and Volcán Tajumulco exceed 500 kilometers (310.7 miles) of topographic isolation and 11 peaks exceed 100 kilometers (62.14 miles) of topographic isolation.

Of these 25 peaks, nine are located in Honduras, four in Guatemala, four in El Salvador, three in Panama, three in Nicaragua, three in Costa Rica, and one in Belize. Pico Mogotón lies on the Nicaragua-Honduras border and Cerro El Pital lies on the El Salvador-Honduras border.

The 25 most topographically isolated summits of Central America with at least 500 meters of topographic prominence
Rank	Mountain peak	Country	Mountain range	Elevation	Prominence	Isolation	Location
1	Chirripó Grande (Cerro Chirripó)	Costa Rica	Cordillera de Talamanca	3819 m 12,530 ft	3755 m 12,320 ft	878 km 546 mi	9.4843°N 83.4889°W
2	Volcán Tajumulco	Guatemala	Sierra de las Nubes	4220 m 13,845 ft	3990 m 13,091 ft	722 km 448 mi	15.0430°N 91.9037°W
3	Cerro Tacarcuna	Panama	Darién	1875 m 6,152 ft	1770 m 5,807 ft	174.4 km 108.3 mi	8.1659°N 77.2959°W
4	Pico Bonito	Honduras	ceb:Cordillera Nombre de Dios	2450 m 8,038 ft	1710 m 5,610 ft	151 km 93.8 mi	15.5575°N 86.8756°W
5	Pico Mogotón	Nicaragua; Honduras	Sierra de las Nubes	2106 m 6,909 ft	1321 m 4,334 ft	142 km 88.2 mi	13.7631°N 86.3983°W
6	Doyle's Delight (Note: The summit of Doyle's Delight is the highest point of Belize and the Yucatán Peninsula.) (Note: Doyle's Delight is the northernmost 1000-meter (3281-foot) summit of Central America.)	Belize	Yucatán Peninsula	1174 m 3,852 ft	500 m 1,640 ft	138.3 km 85.9 mi	16.4941°N 89.0456°W
7	Cerro Hoya (Note: Cerro Hoya is the southernmost 1000-meter (3281-foot) summit of Central America and greater North America.)	Panama	Azuero Peninsula	1559 m 5,115 ft	500 m 1,640 ft	135.7 km 84.3 mi	7.3179°N 80.6810°W
8	Volcán San Cristóbal	Nicaragua	Cordillera Los Maribios	1745 m 5,725 ft	1665 m 5,463 ft	134.5 km 83.6 mi	12.7026°N 87.0057°W
9	Cerro Las Minas	Honduras	Sierra de las Nubes	2849 m 9,347 ft	2069 m 6,788 ft	132 km 82 mi	14.5340°N 88.6804°W
10	Volcán Acatenango	Guatemala	Chimaltenango	3975 m 13,041 ft	1835 m 6,020 ft	125.9 km 78.2 mi	14.5016°N 90.8755°W
11	Sierra de Agalta high point	Honduras	Sierra de Agalta	2335 m 7,661 ft	1505 m 4,938 ft	122.6 km 76.1 mi	14.9576°N 85.9165°W
12	Volcán Miravalles	Costa Rica	Cordillera de Guanacaste	2028 m 6,654 ft	1528 m 5,013 ft	99.4 km 61.8 mi	10.7469°N 85.1505°W
13	Volcán de San Vicente	El Salvador	Sierra Madre de Chiapas	2182 m 7,159 ft	1562 m 5,125 ft	90.3 km 56.1 mi	13.5965°N 88.8376°W
14	ceb:Montaña los Comayagua	Honduras	Comayagua	2407 m 7,897 ft	1507 m 4,944 ft	80.1 km 49.7 mi	14.5000°N 87.5000°W
15	Volcán Barú	Panama	Chiriquí	3474 m 11,398 ft	1324 m 4,344 ft	74.2 km 46.1 mi	8.8088°N 82.5427°W
16	Montaña de Santa Bárbara	Honduras	Santa Bárbara	2744 m 9,003 ft	2084 m 6,837 ft	74 km 46 mi	14.9137°N 88.1145°W
17	Volcán Concepción	Nicaragua	Rivas	1610 m 5,282 ft	1579 m 5,180 ft	69.6 km 43.3 mi	11.5380°N 85.6226°W
18	Volcán de Santa Ana	El Salvador	Sierra Madre de Chiapas	2362 m 7,749 ft	1602 m 5,256 ft	69.1 km 42.9 mi	13.8557°N 89.6288°W
19	ceb:Cerro San Ildefonso (bukid sa Peru)	Honduras	Cortés	2242 m 7,356 ft	1702 m 5,584 ft	68.6 km 42.7 mi	15.5167°N 88.2333°W
20	Alto Cuchumatanes	Guatemala	Huehuetenango	3837 m 12,589 ft	1877 m 6,158 ft	65.2 km 40.5 mi	15.5182°N 91.5445°W
21	ceb:Pico Pijol	Honduras	Yoro	2320 m 7,612 ft	1578 m 5,177 ft	65.1 km 40.4 mi	15.1833°N 87.5667°W
22	Volcán San Miguel	El Salvador	Sierra Madre de Chiapas	2131 m 6,991 ft	1831 m 6,007 ft	64.1 km 39.8 mi	13.4348°N 88.2691°W
23	Cerro El Pital	El Salvador; Honduras	Sierra de las Nubes	2730 m 8,957 ft	1530 m 5,020 ft	51.1 km 31.8 mi	14.3844°N 89.1292°W
24	Volcán Santa María	Guatemala	Sierra Madre	3772 m 12,375 ft	1054 m 3,458 ft	49.4 km 30.7 mi	14.7570°N 91.5517°W
25	Volcán Irazú	Costa Rica	Cordillera Central, Costa Rica	3432 m 11,260 ft	1897 m 6,224 ft	47.8 km 29.7 mi	9.9764°N 83.8534°W

== Gallery ==
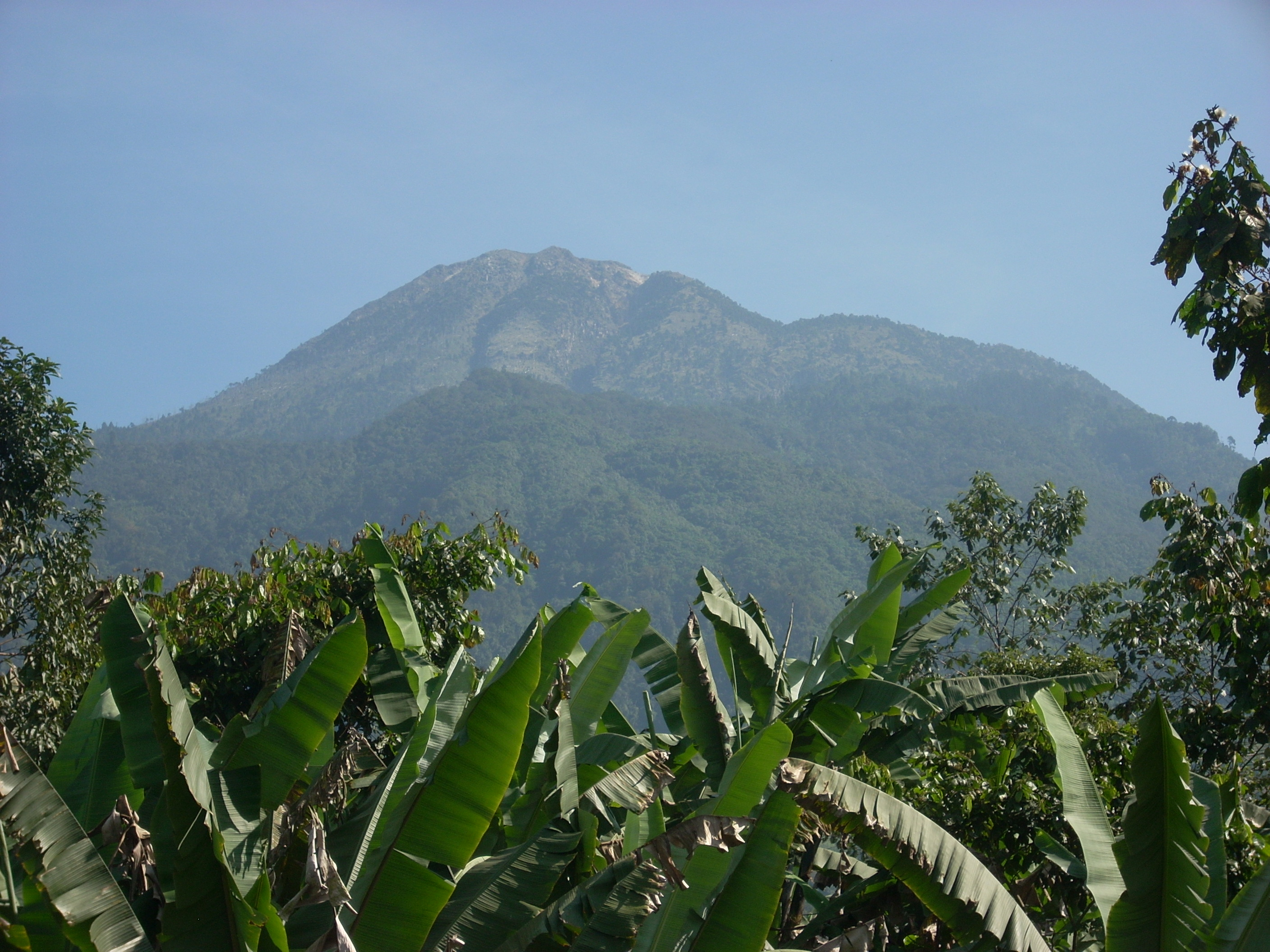
Volcán Tajumulco is the highest summit of Guatemala and all of Central America.

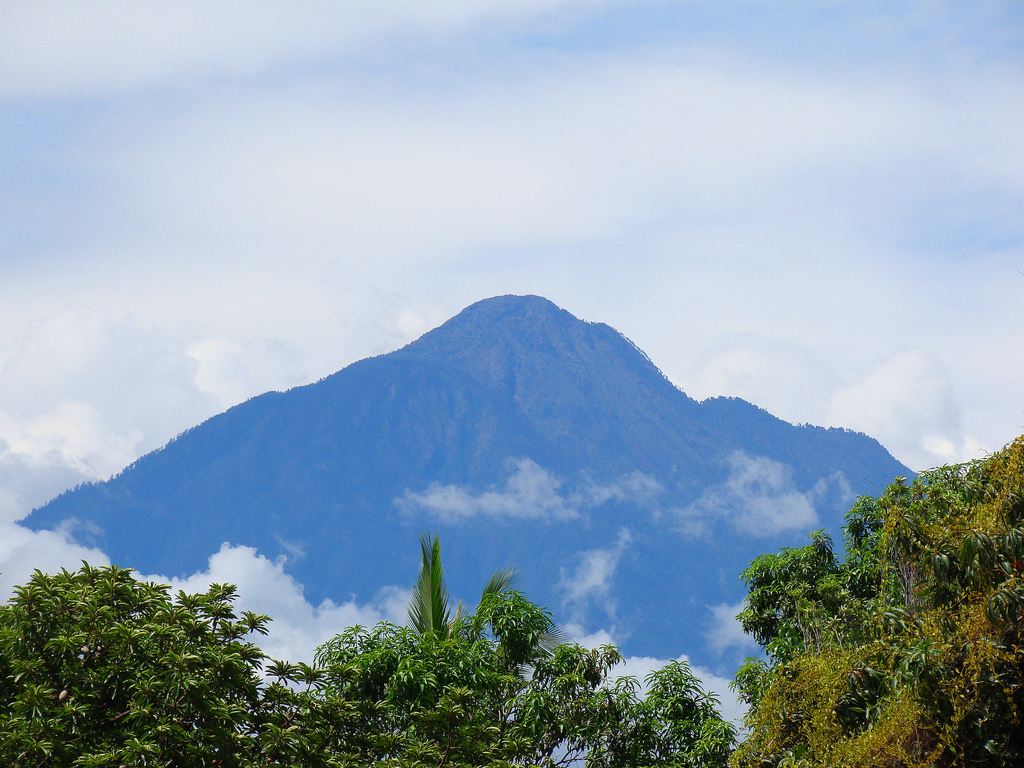
Volcán Tacaná on the border between Guatemala and Mexico is the second highest major summit of Central America.

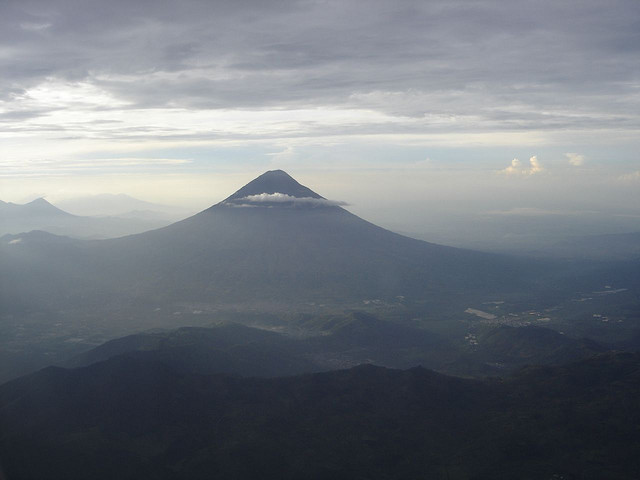
Volcan de Agua in Guatemala.

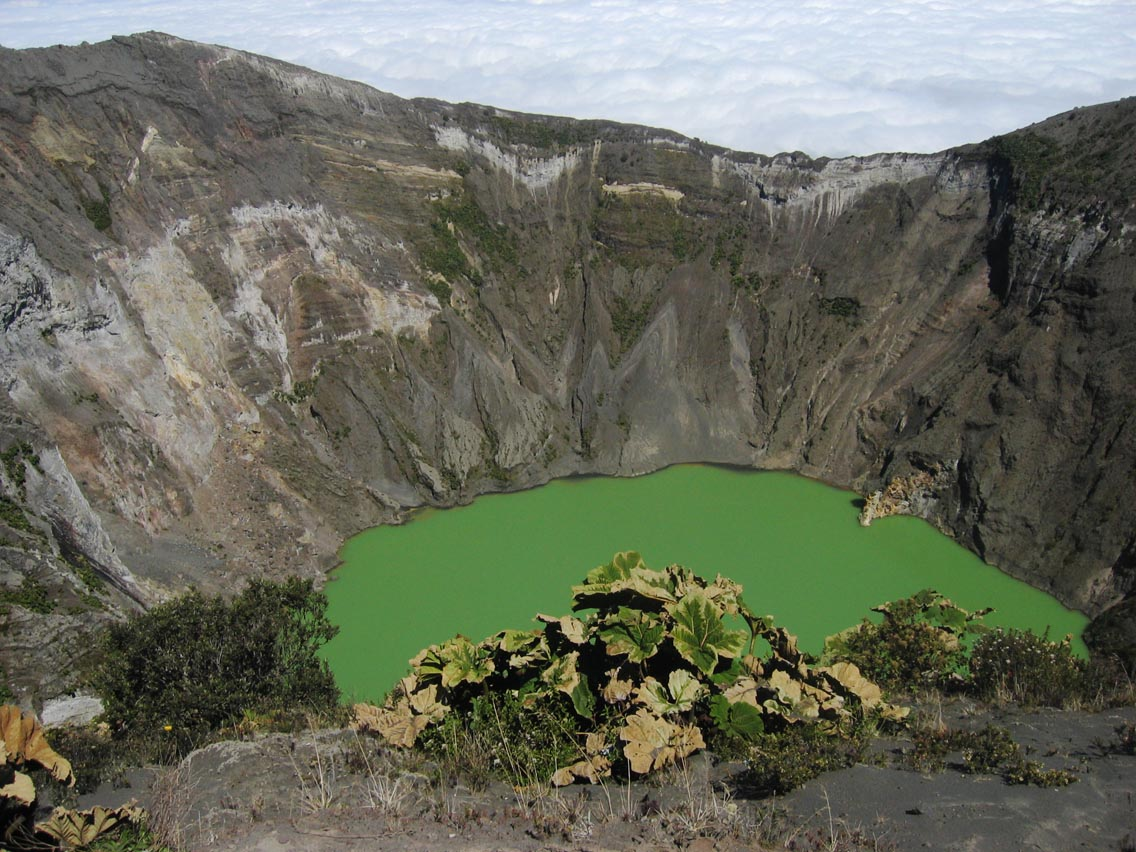
Volcán Irazú in Costa Rica.

== See also ==
- List of mountain peaks of North America
  - List of mountain peaks of Greenland
  - List of mountain peaks of Canada
  - List of mountain peaks of the Rocky Mountains
  - List of mountain peaks of the United States
  - List of mountain peaks of Mexico
  - List of mountain peaks of Central America
    - List of the ultra-prominent summits of Central America
    - List of extreme summits of Central America
  - List of mountain peaks of the Caribbean
- Central America
  - Geography of Central America
  - Geology of Central America
    - Category:Mountains of Central America
      - commons:Category:Mountains of Central America
- Physical geography
  - Topography
    - Topographic elevation
    - Topographic prominence
    - Topographic isolation
