= List of extreme summits of Central America =

This article comprises four sortable tables of mountain summits of Central America that are the higher than any other point north or south of their latitude or east or west their longitude in the region.

The summit of a mountain or hill may be measured in three principal ways:

1. The topographic elevation of a summit measures the height of the summit above a geodetic sea level.
2. The topographic prominence of a summit is a measure of how high the summit rises above its surroundings.
3. The topographic isolation (or radius of dominance) of a summit measures how far the summit lies from its nearest point of equal elevation.

== Northernmost high summits ==
The northernmost summits of their elevation in Central America
Rank	Mountain Peak	Country	Mountain range	Elevation	Prominence	Isolation	Location
5	Doyle's Delight (Note: The summit of Doyle's Delight is the highest point of Belize and the Yucatán Peninsula.) (Note: Doyle's Delight is the northernmost 1000-meter (3281-foot) summit of Central America.)	Belize	Yucatán Peninsula	1174 m 3,852 ft	500 m 1,640 ft	138.3 km 85.9 mi	16.4941°N 89.0456°W
4	Pico Bonito (Note: Pico Bonito is the northernmost 2000-meter (6562-foot) summit of Central America.)	Honduras	Cordillera Nombre de Dios	2450 m 8,038 ft	1710 m 5,610 ft	151 km 93.8 mi	15.5575°N 86.8756°W
3	Alto Cuchumatanes (Note: Alto Cuchumatanes is the northernmost 3000-meter (9843-foot) summit of Central America.)	Guatemala	Huehuetenango	3837 m 12,589 ft	1877 m 6,158 ft	65.2 km 40.5 mi	15.5182°N 91.5445°W
2	Volcán Tacaná (Note: Volcán Tacaná on the international border with Guatemala is the highest point of Estado Libre y Soberano de Chiapas.)	Chiapas; Guatemala	Sierra de Istatan	4067 m 13,343 ft	1037 m 3,402 ft	24.1 km 14.99 mi	15.1323°N 92.1084°W
1	Volcán Tajumulco (Note: The summit of Volcán Tajumulco is the highest point of the Sierra de las Nubes, the Republic of Guatemala, and all of Central America.) (Note: Volcán Tajumulco is the southernmost and easternmost 4000-meter (13,123-foot) summit of greater North America.)	Guatemala	Sierra de las Nubes	4220 m 13,845 ft	3990 m 13,091 ft	722 km 448 mi	15.0430°N 91.9037°W

== Southernmost high summits ==
The southernmost summits of their elevation in Central America
Rank	Mountain Peak	Country	Mountain range	Elevation	Prominence	Isolation	Location
6	Cerro Hoya (Note: Cerro Hoya is the southernmost 1000-meter (3281-foot) summit of Central America and greater North America.)	Panama	Azuero Peninsula	1559 m 5,115 ft	500 m 1,640 ft	135.7 km 84.3 mi	7.3179°N 80.6810°W
5	Cerro Tacarcuna (Note: Cerro Tacarcuna is the southernmost ultra-prominent summit of Central America and greater North America.)	Panama	Darién	1875 m 6,152 ft	1770 m 5,807 ft	174.4 km 108.3 mi	8.1659°N 77.2959°W
4	Volcán Barú (Note: The summit of Volcán Barú is the highest point of the Republic of Panama.) (Note: Volcán Barú is the southernmost 3000-meter (9843-foot) summit of Central America and greater North America.)	Panama	Chiriquí	3474 m 11,398 ft	1324 m 4,344 ft	74.2 km 46.1 mi	8.8088°N 82.5427°W
3	Chirripó Grande (Note: The summit of Chirripó Grande is the highest point of the Republic of Costa Rica.) (Note: Chirripó Grande is the southernmost and easternmost summit of its elevation in Central America and greater North America.) (Cerro Chirripó)	Costa Rica	Cordillera de Talamanca	3819 m 12,530 ft	3755 m 12,320 ft	878 km 546 mi	9.4843°N 83.4889°W
2	Volcán Acatenango (Note: Volcán Acatenango is the southernmost and easternmost summit of its elevation in Central America and greater North America.)	Guatemala	Chimaltenango	3975 m 13,041 ft	1835 m 6,020 ft	125.9 km 78.2 mi	14.5016°N 90.8755°W
1	Volcán Tajumulco	Guatemala	Sierra de las Nubes	4220 m 13,845 ft	3990 m 13,091 ft	722 km 448 mi	15.0430°N 91.9037°W

== Easternmost high summits ==
The easternmost summits of their elevation in Central America
Rank	Mountain Peak	Country	Mountain range	Elevation	Prominence	Isolation	Location
5	Cerro Tacarcuna	Panama	Darién	1875 m 6,152 ft	1770 m 5,807 ft	174.4 km 108.3 mi	8.1659°N 77.2959°W
4	Volcán Barú	Panama	Chiriquí	3474 m 11,398 ft	1324 m 4,344 ft	74.2 km 46.1 mi	8.8088°N 82.5427°W
3	Chirripó Grande (Cerro Chirripó)	Costa Rica	Cordillera de Talamanca	3819 m 12,530 ft	3755 m 12,320 ft	878 km 546 mi	9.4843°N 83.4889°W
2	Volcán Acatenango	Guatemala	Chimaltenango	3975 m 13,041 ft	1835 m 6,020 ft	125.9 km 78.2 mi	14.5016°N 90.8755°W
1	Volcán Tajumulco	Guatemala	Sierra de las Nubes	4220 m 13,845 ft	3990 m 13,091 ft	722 km 448 mi	15.0430°N 91.9037°W

== Westernmost high summits ==
Volcán Tacaná and Volcán Tajumulco are the two highest summits of Central America.

The westernmost summits of their elevation in Central America
Rank	Mountain Peak	Country	Mountain range	Elevation	Prominence	Isolation	Location
2	Volcán Tacaná	Chiapas; Guatemala	Sierra de Istatan	4067 m 13,343 ft	1037 m 3,402 ft	24.1 km 14.99 mi	15.1323°N 92.1084°W
1	Volcán Tajumulco	Guatemala	Sierra de las Nubes	4220 m 13,845 ft	3990 m 13,091 ft	722 km 448 mi	15.0430°N 91.9037°W

== Gallery ==
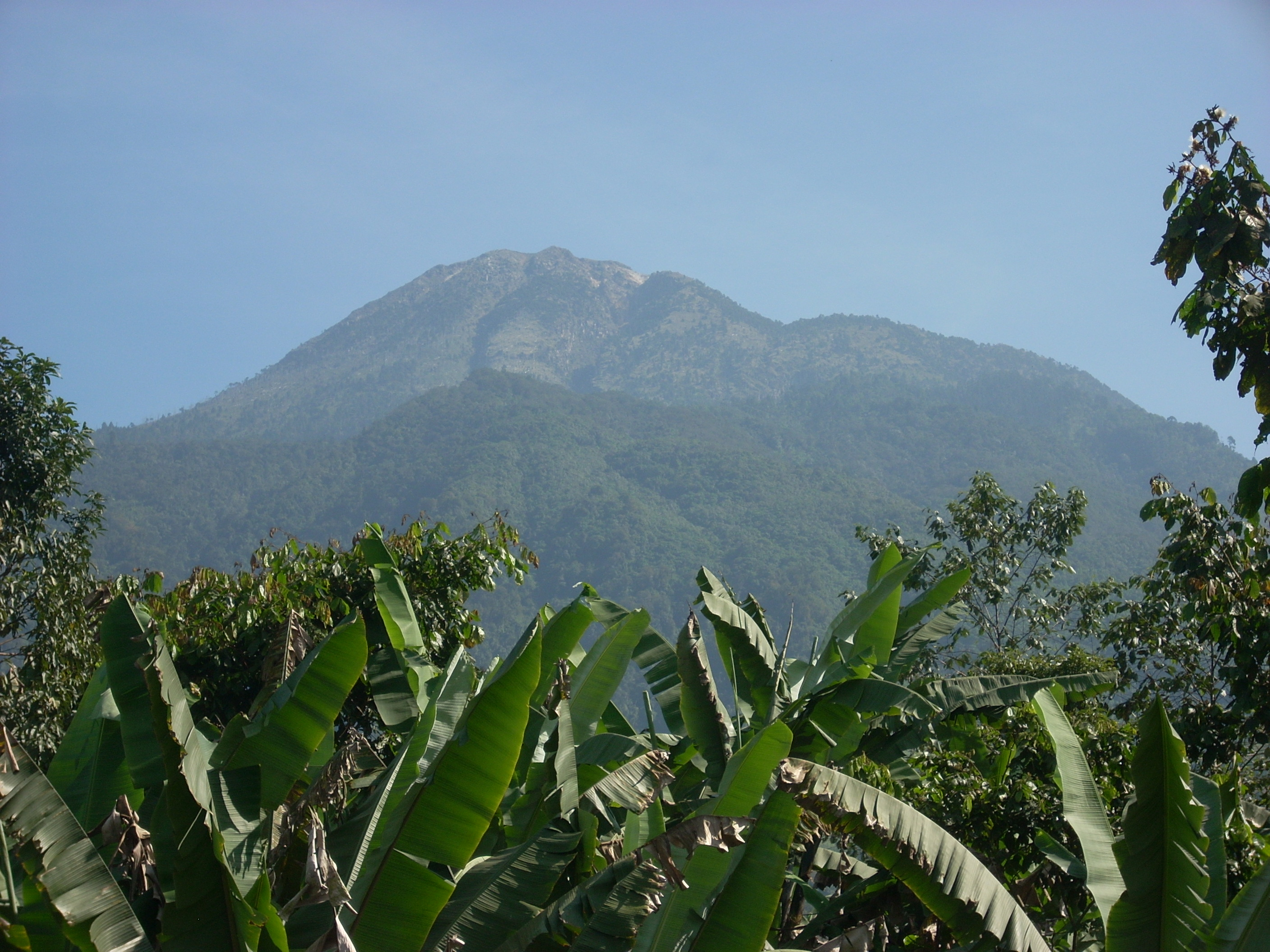
Volcán Tajumulco is the highest summit of Guatemala and all of Central America.

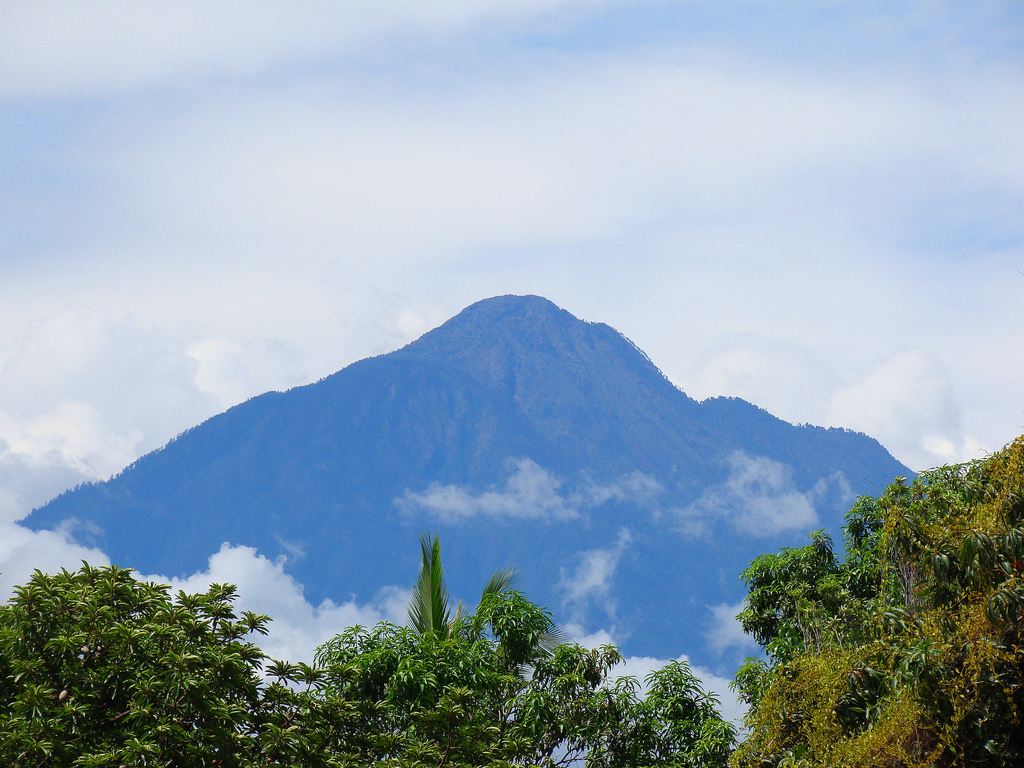
Volcán Tacaná on the border between Guatemala and Mexico is the second highest major summit of Central America.

== See also ==
- List of mountain peaks of North America
  - List of mountain peaks of Greenland
  - List of mountain peaks of Canada
  - List of mountain peaks of the Rocky Mountains
  - List of mountain peaks of the United States
  - List of mountain peaks of Mexico
  - List of mountain peaks of Central America
    - List of the ultra-prominent summits of Central America
    - List of extreme summits of Central America
  - List of mountain peaks of the Caribbean
- Central America
  - Geography of Central America
  - Geology of Central America
    - Category:Mountains of Central America
      - commons:Category:Mountains of Central America
- Physical geography
  - Topography
    - Topographic elevation
    - Topographic prominence
    - Topographic isolation
