= Bulgarians in Honduras =

Total population
- 7,500–10,000

Regions with significant populations
- La Ceiba, Gracias a Dios, Tocoa

Languages
- Bulgarian, Spanish

Religion
- Christianity

Bulgarians in Honduras are an ethnic group. The number of hereditary Bulgarians in 2010 is estimated at 7,500-10,000 people, which is more than 0.1% of the country's population. Most of them are mestizos. Diplomatic relations between Bulgaria and Honduras were established in 2004.

== History ==
According to the official immigration statistics of Honduras, there were 103 Bulgarians in the country in 1935; in reality the number was significantly higher. According to the memories of one Bulgar Honduran, Marcio Mladenov, 50 Bulgarians entered through the port of Trujillo in just one day. Bulgarians in Honduras are descendants of Bulgarian emigrants from the 1920s to the 1930s. Most of them worked in the banana plantations or grew vegetables, but a small number were also engaged in baking or charcoal production.

In 1928, the first Bulgarian emigrant settled in La Ceiba, Boris Petrov, who left his native Belogradchishki region and settled in Central America via Cuba. Petrov set up a banana plantation, and was soon followed by his compatriots. These foreigners were so enterprising that they soon built a railway. The then president of the country was so impressed that he ordered the treasury to cover the costs of the railway and ordered more kilometers to be built. Instead of building in a straight line, the Bulgarians began to meander to get more mileage. They soon became so wealthy that they became employers of the local mestizos, and even started printing money.

In the period 1928–1935, 130 Bulgarians arrived in Honduras. An interesting fact is that there was a Bulgarian settlement on the Caribbean coast that existed until 1955. There were the plantations of the Bulgarians who grew vegetables, and brought them down the river to the market in La Ceiba. In the area around La Ceiba flows the Bulgaria river (or Rio Bulgaria), discovered by the local Bulgarian Boris Petrov.

== Cultural events ==
On March 26, 2010, the first meeting of the Bulgarians in Honduras took place in the city of Tocoa, it was sponsored by the local businessman of Bulgarian origin - Boris Elenkov. Two hotels have been rented for the accommodation of the Bulgarians.
