= Cerro Cambutal =

Highest point
- Elevation: 4,593 ft (1,400 m)
- Coordinates: 7°20′17″N 80°40′3″W

Geography
- Location: Azuero Province, Panama

Cerro Cambutal is one of the highest peaks in the Sierra de Azuero, in Panama, with an altitude of 1,400 metres (4,600 ft) above sea level. It is located in the district of Tonosí in the province of Los Santos. It is the highest peak in the province of Los Santos.

== Geology ==
Cerro Cambutal is on a peak of volcanic origin in the Sierra de Azuero. It is on the part of the main peaks of the Sierra de Azuero, along with the three highest mountains of the Sierra de Azuero (Hoya, Moya and Soya hills) which, with heights of 1,559 metres (5,115 ft), 1,534 metres (5,033 ft), and 1,478 metres (4,849 ft) above sea level respectively, that constitutes the heart of the Cerro Hoya National Park.
