= Cordillera Dipilto and Jalapa Natural Reserve =

Nature reserve in Nicaragua

Coordillera Dipilto and Jalapa Natural Reserve is a nature reserve in Nicaragua. It is one of the 78 reserves that are under official protection in the country.

The reserve is in the Nueva Segovia Department and covers an area of 31,315 hectares. Coffee plantations cover almost two-thirds of the area.

Nicaragua's highest mountain, Cerro Mogotón, is within the reserve.
