= San Gerardo de Rivas =

Village in Costa Rica

Coordinates: 9.465317°N 83.595142°W

San Gerardo de Rivas is a small village (population less than 400) high up in the valley of the Chirripó Pacífico river in the Talamanca Mountains of south central Costa Rica. It is 20 kilometers northeast of San Isidro de El General, which is the second-largest city in San José Province.

== Economy and tourism ==
San Gerardo de Rivas is a traditional Tico village situated in an agricultural region in the Talamanca Mountain range, although recently is changing to adopt eco-tourism, with economic opportunities for locals and newcomers also. The complex and rare cloud forest environment the village is located in is famed for its waterfalls and its diverse wildlife including rare species of birds, large felines (cougars and jaguars) and monkeys, varieties of orchids and butterflies.

A few miles above the village the road splits in two directions, one goes towards the Cloudbridge Nature Reserve, while the other is the start of the Cerro Chirripó National Park's hiking trail leading up towards the peak. The village acts as a base camp for hikers and climbers wishing to reach the peak of Cerro Chirripó, the highest mountain in Costa Rica and the second highest in Central America.

The Aguas Termales GEVI thermal pools in San Gerardo de Rivas is a favorite destination among locals and tourists, which is fed by a natural thermal water stream.

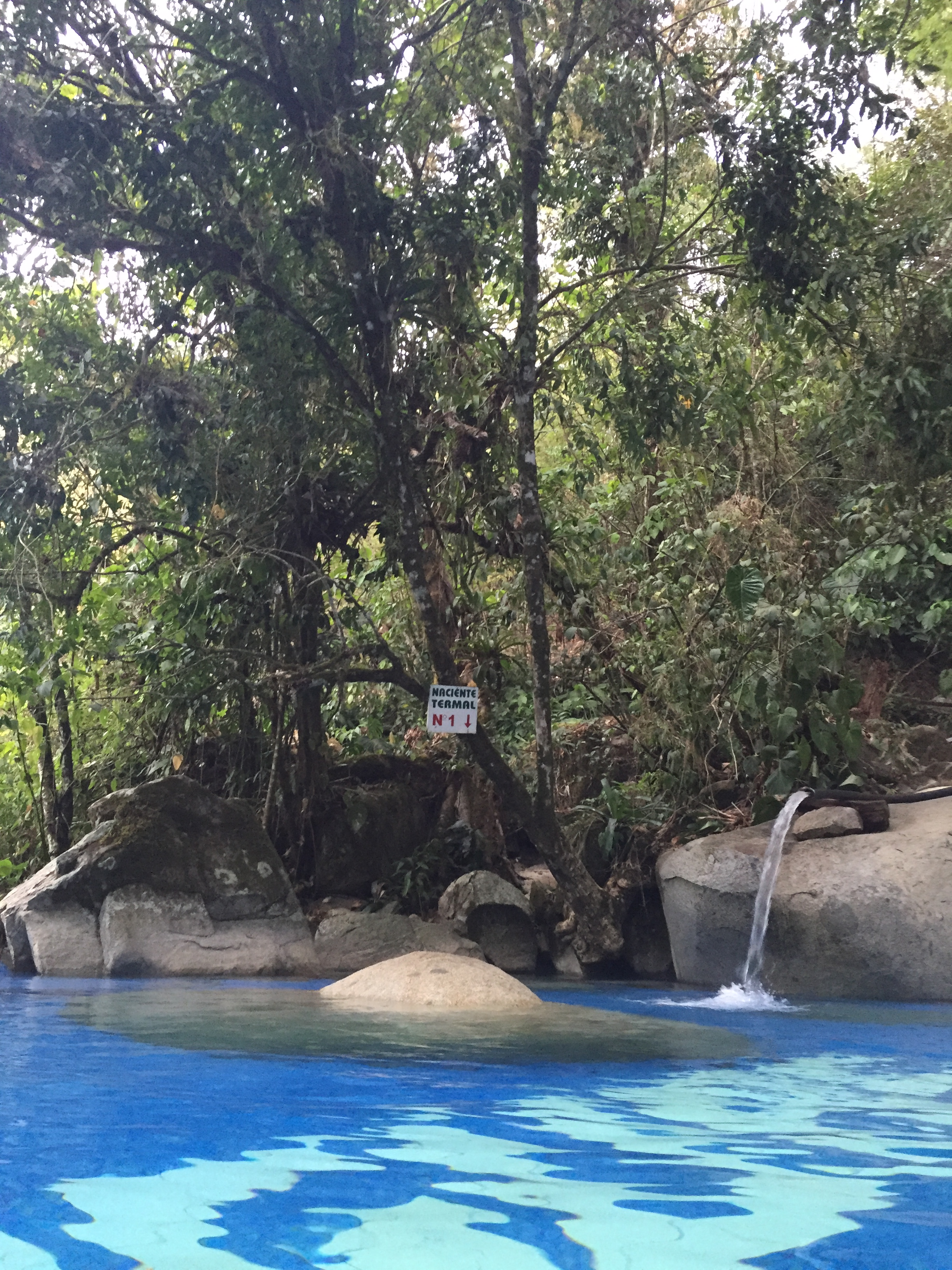
The Aguas Termales GEVI thermal pools
