= Volcán Tacaná =

Stratovolcano in western Guatemala

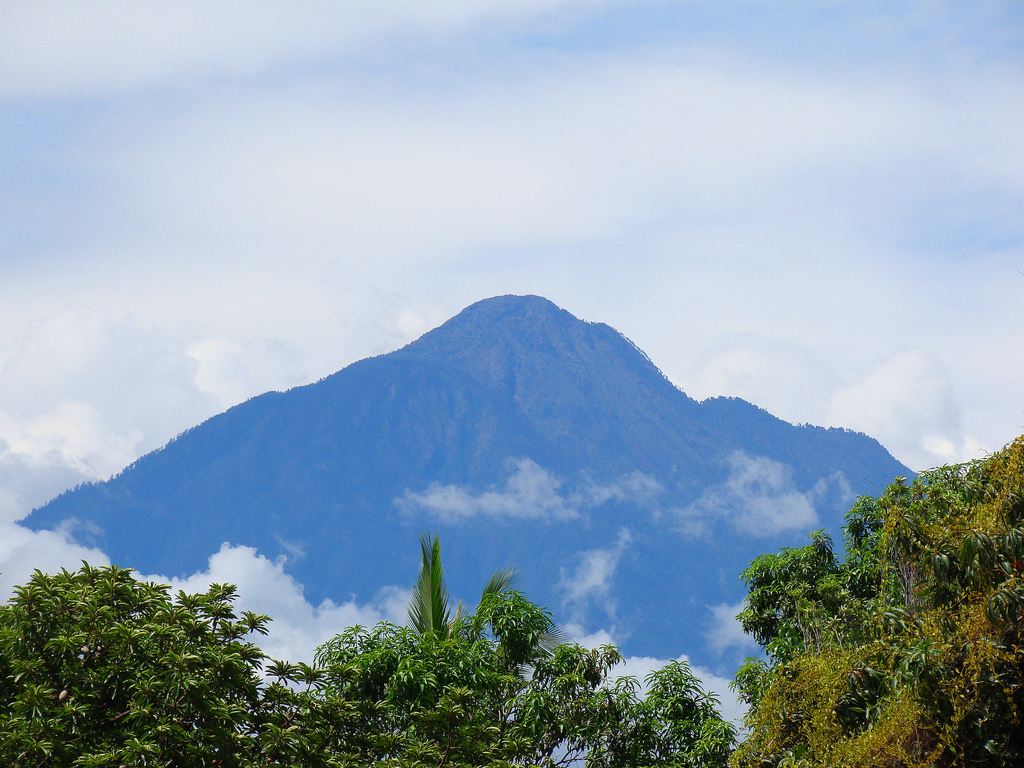

Highest point
- Elevation: 4,060 m (13,320 ft)
- Prominence: 1,030 m (3,380 ft)
- Listing: North America highest peaks 102nd
- Coordinates: 15°07′57″N 92°06′31″W

Geography
- Location within Central America Location within Mexico Location within Guatemala
- Location: San Marcos, Guatemala and Chiapas, Mexico
- Parent range: Sierra Madre de Chiapas

Geology
- Mountain type: Stratovolcano
- Volcanic arc: Central America Volcanic Arc
- Last eruption: May 1986

Volcán Tacaná is the second highest peak in Central America at 4,060 metres (13,320 ft), located in the Sierra Madre de Chiapas of western Guatemala and southern Mexico. It is also known in Mexico as Volcán Tacina.

== Geography ==
The volcano is located within the Tacaná municipality of the San Marcos Department in Guatemala; and within the Cacahoatán and Unión Juárez Municipalities of Chiapas state in Mexico.

Its last known eruption was registered in 1986 — a small phreatic eruption in May — but it is still considered as dangerous to more than 250,000 people residing in the area.

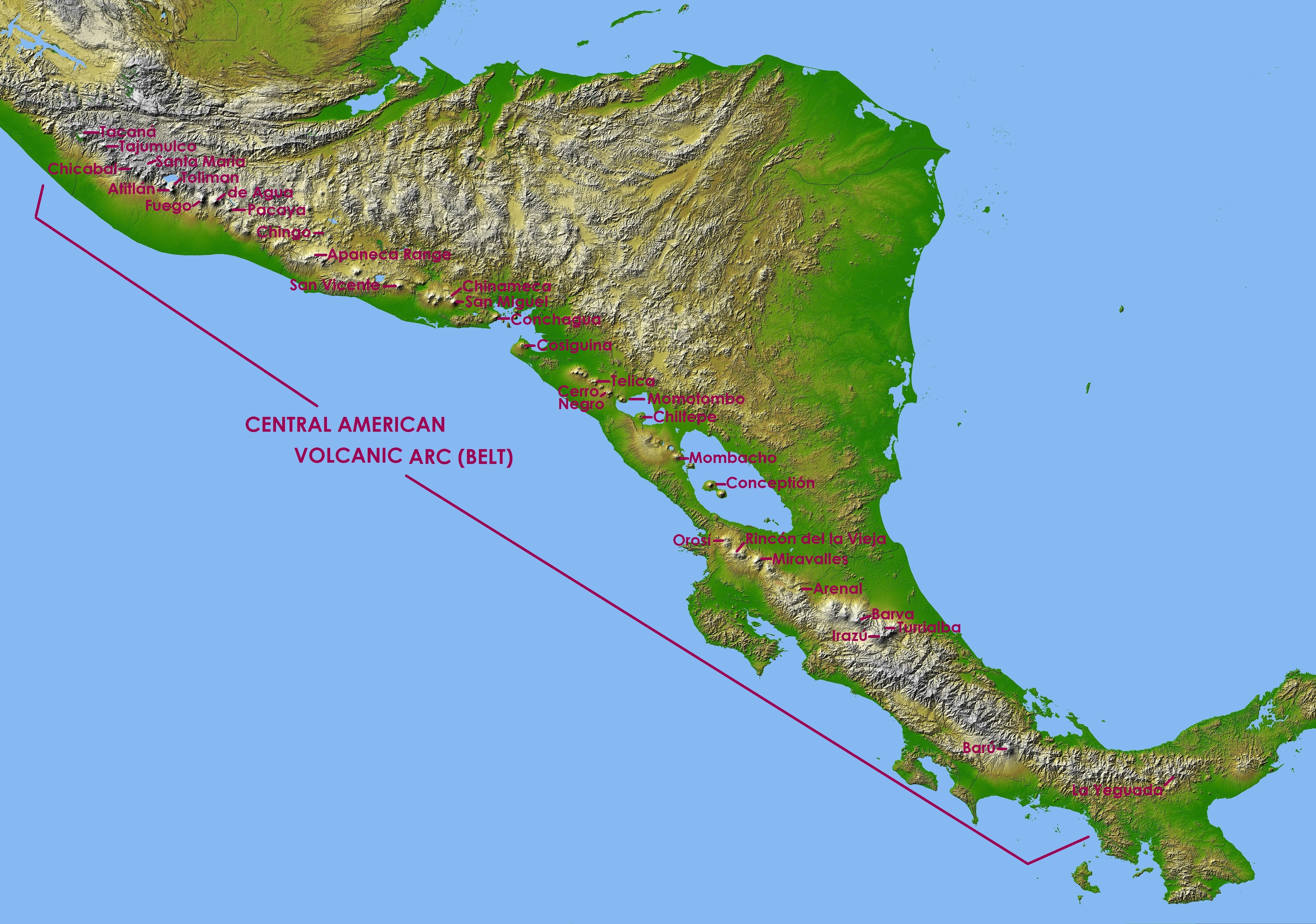
Map of the Central America volcanic arc, with captions showing the location of several volcanoes. Tacaná is the first large volcano, at the top of the row of captioned volcanoes on this image.

Tacaná is the first of hundreds of volcanoes in a 1,500 km (930 mi) km row, arranged NW to SE, parallel to the Pacific Ocean coast of Central America, known as the Central America Volcanic Arc, formed by an active subduction zone along the western boundary of the Caribbean Plate.

The agricultural valley at its NNE foothills is covered with thick deposits of lahars. From its headwaters in Guatemala, the valley drains through Mexico to the Pacific Ocean. Consequently, mudflows from future eruptions could be dangerous to those in their path in both countries.

== Volcanology ==
Tacaná is a stratovolcano (composite volcano) that is surrounded by deeply dissected plutonic and metamorphic terrain. It has a 9 km (5.6 mi) wide caldera, with its elongated summit dominated by several lava domes and three large calderas breached to the south.

Mild phreatic eruptions of Tacaná took place in historical times. Its most powerful known explosive activity, which included pyroclastic flows, occurred at about 70 AD (± 100 years). That large explosion has resulted in Tacaná being classified with a volcanic explosivity index of 4 by the Smithsonian National Museum of Natural History's Global Volcanism Program.

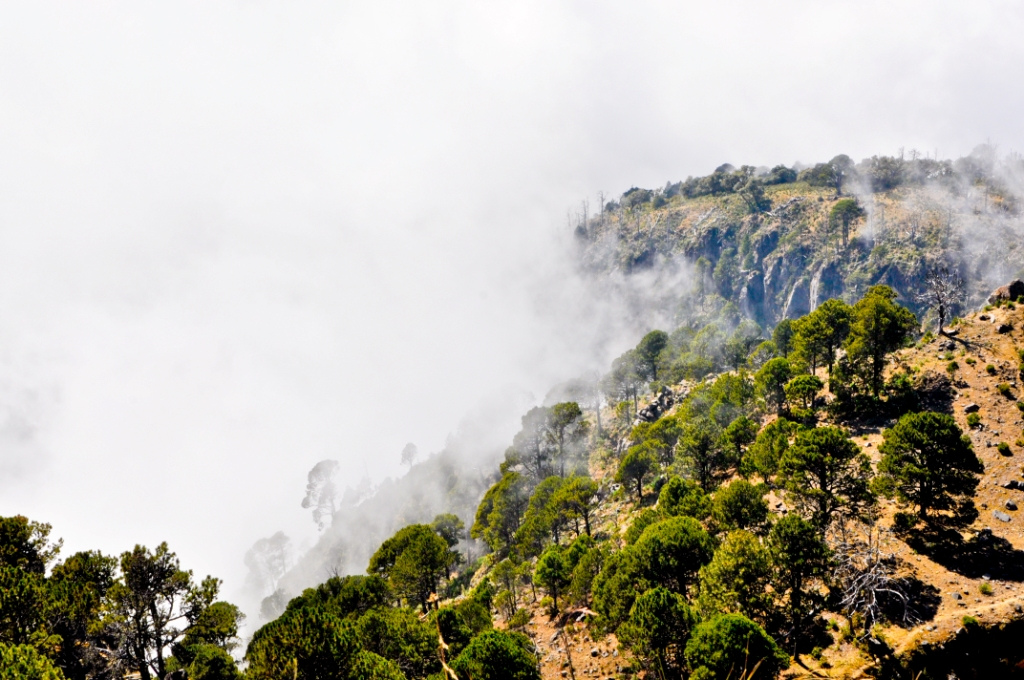
Forest on the slope of Volcán Tacaná.

Snow at Volcán Tacaná, 2013

== Biosphere Reserve ==
Tacaná is part of the Central American Core volcanic chain, which contains fragile ecosystems and rich biodiversity of cultural, scientific, economic and biological relevance, particularly in the high mountain ecosystem. Its landscapes and volcanic edifice present geophysical features of great scientific and aesthetic value.

Consequently, it has been included in UNESCO's World Network of Biosphere Reserves of the Man and Biosphere Program (MAB).

== Visitor access ==
The summit of Tacaná can be reached in about 10 hours. There are two approaches to the mountain. One is from Finca Navidad, south of the volcano, passing through Tojquián Grande, on the Guatemalan side, and moving parallel to the border with Mexico.

The second route is from the Mexican side, from El Carmen, Talismán bridge, Cacahoatán, and Unión Juárez by vehicle, and from there on foot. This route crosses into Guatemala and has been described as one of the most interesting hikes in Central America, leading up winding paths through lush rainforests, subsistence farming villages, up ancient magma flows, and rock-filled temperate forests before reaching the top of the lowest caldera. From there the final stretch to the summit provides panoramic views high above the clouds as the tree-line gradually diminishes with altitude. Several major volcanos within the Central American Volcanic Arch including Tajumulco are visible from the summit.

== See also ==
- List of mountain peaks of North America
  - List of mountain peaks of Mexico
    - List of volcanoes in Mexico
  - List of mountain peaks of Central America
    - List of volcanoes in Guatemala
