= Cerro El Pital =

Mountain in El Salvador and Honduras

- Location within El Salvador

Highest point
- Elevation: 2,730 m (8,960 ft)
- Prominence: 1,530 m (5,020 ft)
- Listing: Country high point Ultra
- Coordinates: 14°23′00″N 89°07′00″W

Naming
- Language of name: Spanish

Geography
- Location: Chalatenango, El Salvador − Honduras border
- Parent range: Sierra Madre

Cerro El Pital is a mountain in northern El Salvador, near the border with Honduras. Located approximately 12 km (7 mi) from the town of La Palma, it rises to 2,730 m (8,957 ft) above sea level, making it the highest point in El Salvador. The mountain is situated within a cloud forest with a reported average annual temperature of 10 °C (50 °F).

It is a popular tourist destination in El Salvador, known for its biodiversity across a broad elevational range. Its cloud forest provides habitat for rare and endangered species of plants and animals, including quetzals.

From November to February, temperatures at Cerro El Pital range from −6 °C (21 °F) to 10 °C (50 °F), with the lowest recorded temperature recorded in January 1956. During the remainder of the year, temperatures range from 5 °C (41 °F) to 17 °C (63 °F). On April 13, 2004, a storm brought an unusual accumulation of hail that blanketed much of the mountain and attracted considerable attention from the local community.

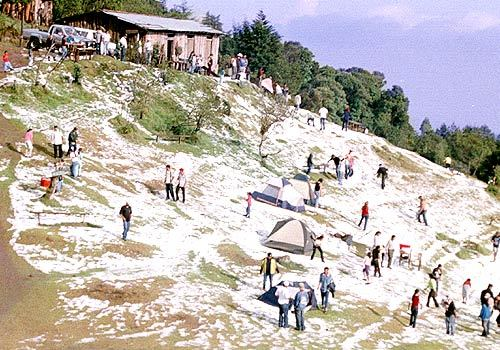
Cerro El Pital, El Salvador.
