= Cerro Chirripó =

Tallest mountain in Costa Rica

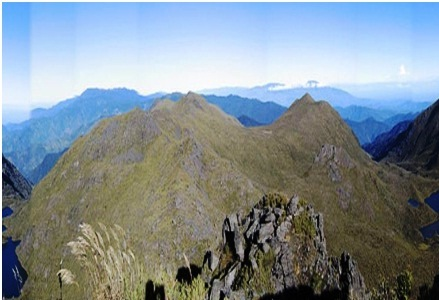

Highest point
- Elevation: 3,821 m (12,536 ft)
- Prominence: 3,727 m (12,228 ft)
- Listing: World's 37th most prominent peak; 2nd most prominent Central American peak; Most isolated major summit in Central America; 5th tallest Central American peak
- Coordinates: 9°29′2.7″N 83°29′19.2″W

Geography
- Location within Costa Rica
- Location: Chirripó National Park, Costa Rica
- Parent range: Talamanca Range

Climbing
- First ascent: 1904, Agustín Blessing Presinger

Cerro Chirripó is the highest mountain in Costa Rica, with an elevation of 3,821 meters (12,536 feet). It is part of the Cordillera de Talamanca, and the mountain range's highest point. It is located in Chirripó National Park and is noted for its ecological wealth.

Mount Chirripó is very tall relative to its surroundings, evidenced by its particularly high topographic prominence of 3,727 m (12,228 ft). This makes it the 37th most prominent peak in the world. On clear days it is possible to see across the country from the Pacific Ocean to the Caribbean Sea.

== Geography ==
Chirripó is the 37th most prominent peak in the world. The most abundant ecosystem in the mountains is the páramo, which extends across almost all the mountains. It also has a large number of lakes on the top, which is because during the previous ice age it was covered with snow. When the ice melted, these unique glacial lakes were formed. The mountain was named "Chirripo", meaning "land of eternal waters", by indigenous Costa Ricans because of the many lakes and streams around the mountain.

=== Climate ===
The temperatures on Mount Chirripo during the day range between 4 and 18 °C (39 and 64 °F), and at night they can drop to between −3 and 1 °C (27 and 34 °F). The coldest temperature ever documented in Costa Rica was −9 °C (16 °F), and recorded here. Snow has not fallen on the peak in the past 100 years or so, but hail is sometimes reported.

== History ==
The earliest known civilization to inhabit the area of Chirripó was the indigenous Cabécar people. In 1904, Agustín Blessing Presinger became the first known European to climb the peak.

The first official hiking trail was constructed in 1965; it led to a small sheet-metal hut five kilometers away from the peak. Today, the hut has been replaced by a concrete building visited by 7,000 people each year. In 1975, Chirripó National Park was founded, enclosing and protecting 500 square kilometers of rain forest and mountains around the peak.

Since 1953, there have been five major wildfires in the area. Forest fires occurred in 1976, in the 1990s, and in 2012.

== Ecology ==
In the lowest parts of the mountains, the cloud forest dominates, with oak trees no higher than 50 meters, accompanied with mosses, lichens, and orchids. Whereas, in the upper parts of the mountain the páramo is predominant, an ecosystem characterized by short and dry grass. The high peaks in Chirripó National Park and La Amistad International Park host important areas of Talamancan montane forest and Costa Rican Páramo with high endemism and extremely high biodiversity. The peaks of these mountains constitute sky islands for many species of plants and animals. In fact, types of squirrels, hummingbirds, rabbits, quetzals, frogs, white-nosed coati and even jaguars habit the mountains.

== Hiking ==
A permit from the National Park office in San Gerardo de Rivas is needed to climb Mount Chirripó. The summit can be reached from the trailhead via a 19.5-kilometer (12.1 mile) hike, which starts 1,500 meters (4,900 ft) above sea level in the village of San Gerardo in the Talamanca Range. From the valley, the path rises through fields, woodlands, and eventually lush rainforest. The forest gradually turns into scrubland. The trail continuously ascends and descends through ridges and valleys until it reaches the final visitors' refuge at an elevation of 3,392 meters, from which there is a two hour hike to the summit. Once the last ridge is crossed, 200 meters of steep path lead up to the summit, which is a 6-meter wide platform of rocks.

== See also ==
- Mountain peaks of North America
- List of Ultras of Central America
