= Mogotón =

Mountain in Nicaragua/Honduras

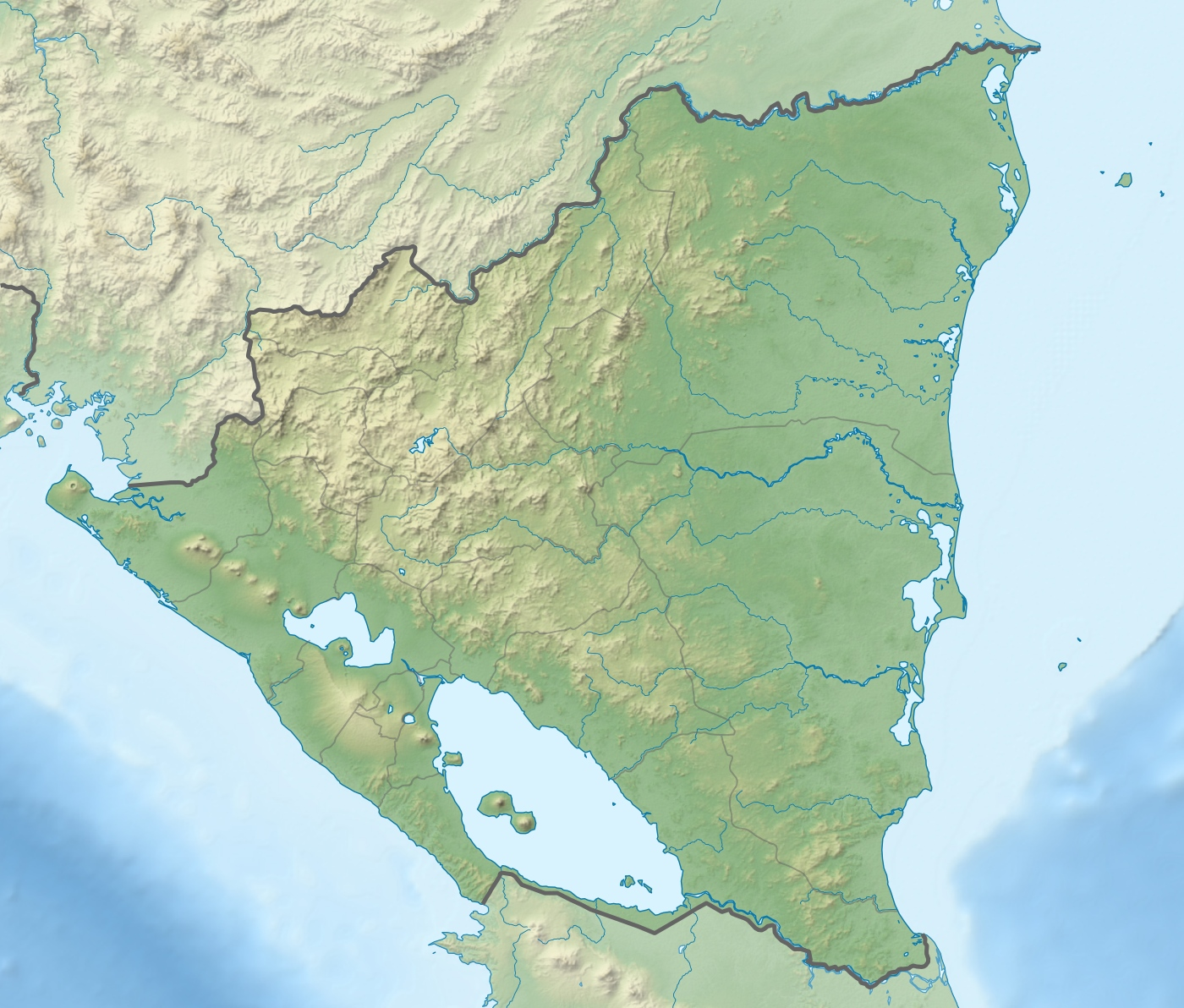
- Location within Nicaragua

Highest point
- Elevation: 2,085 m (6,841 ft)
- Listing: Country high point
- Coordinates: 13°45′46.6″N 86°23′54.6″W

Geography
- Location: Nicaragua / Honduras

Mogotón is a mountain in the Reserva Nacional Cordillera Dipilto y Jalapa on the border of Nicaragua and Honduras; It rises 6,841 feet (2,085 m) above sea level and is the highest point in Nicaragua.
