= Sierra de Agalta National Park =

National park in Honduras

- IUCN category II (national park)
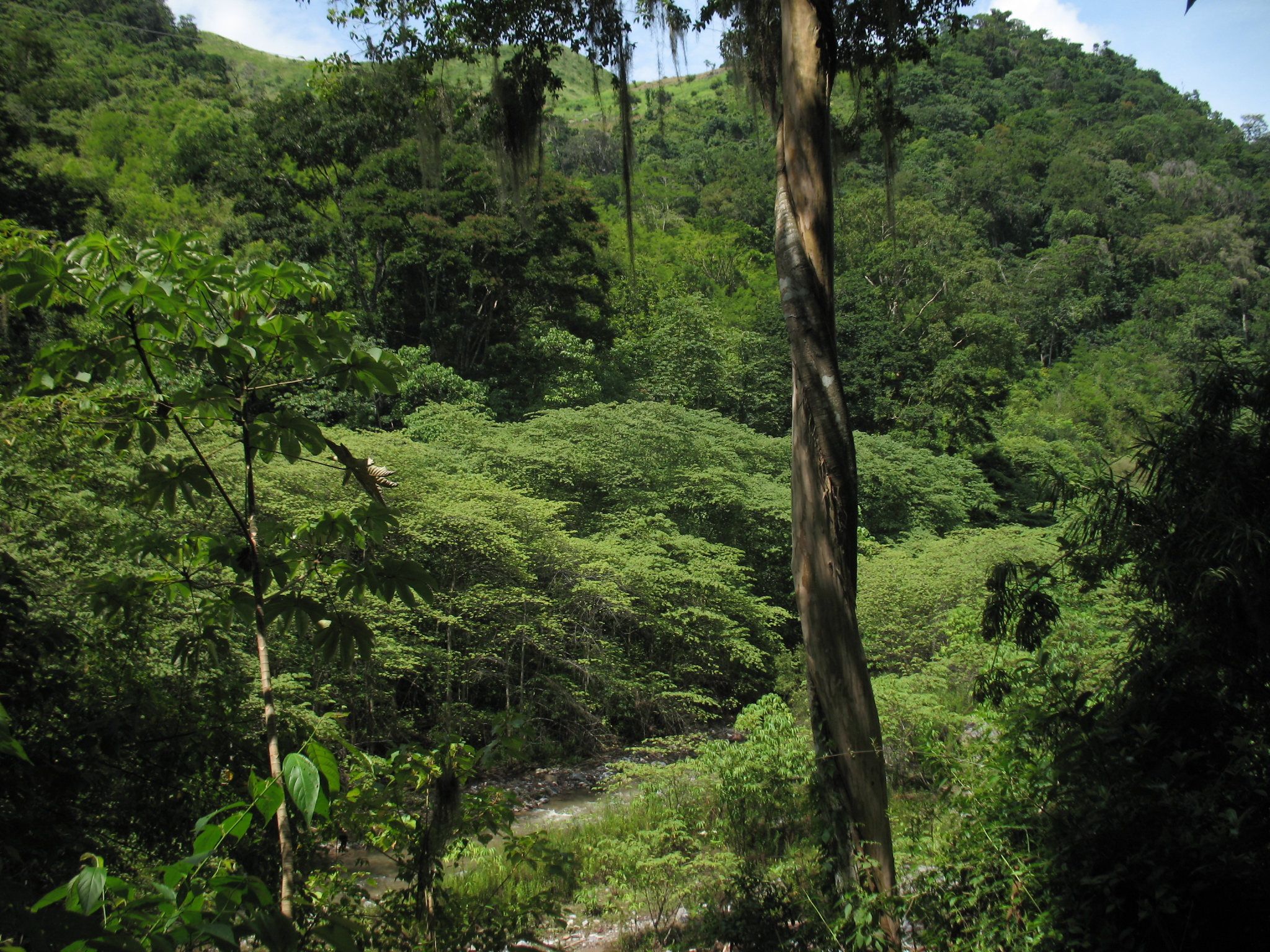

- Location within Honduras
- Location: Honduras
- Coordinates: 15°00′37″N 85°51′09″W
- Area: 207.85 km^{2} (80.25 sq mi)
- Established: 1 January 1987

Sierra de Agalta National Park is a national park in Honduras. It was established on 1 January 1987 and covers an area of 207.85 square kilometres. It has an altitude of between 1,800 and 2,354 metres.
