= Cerro Las Minas =

Mountain in Honduras

- Montana de Celaque
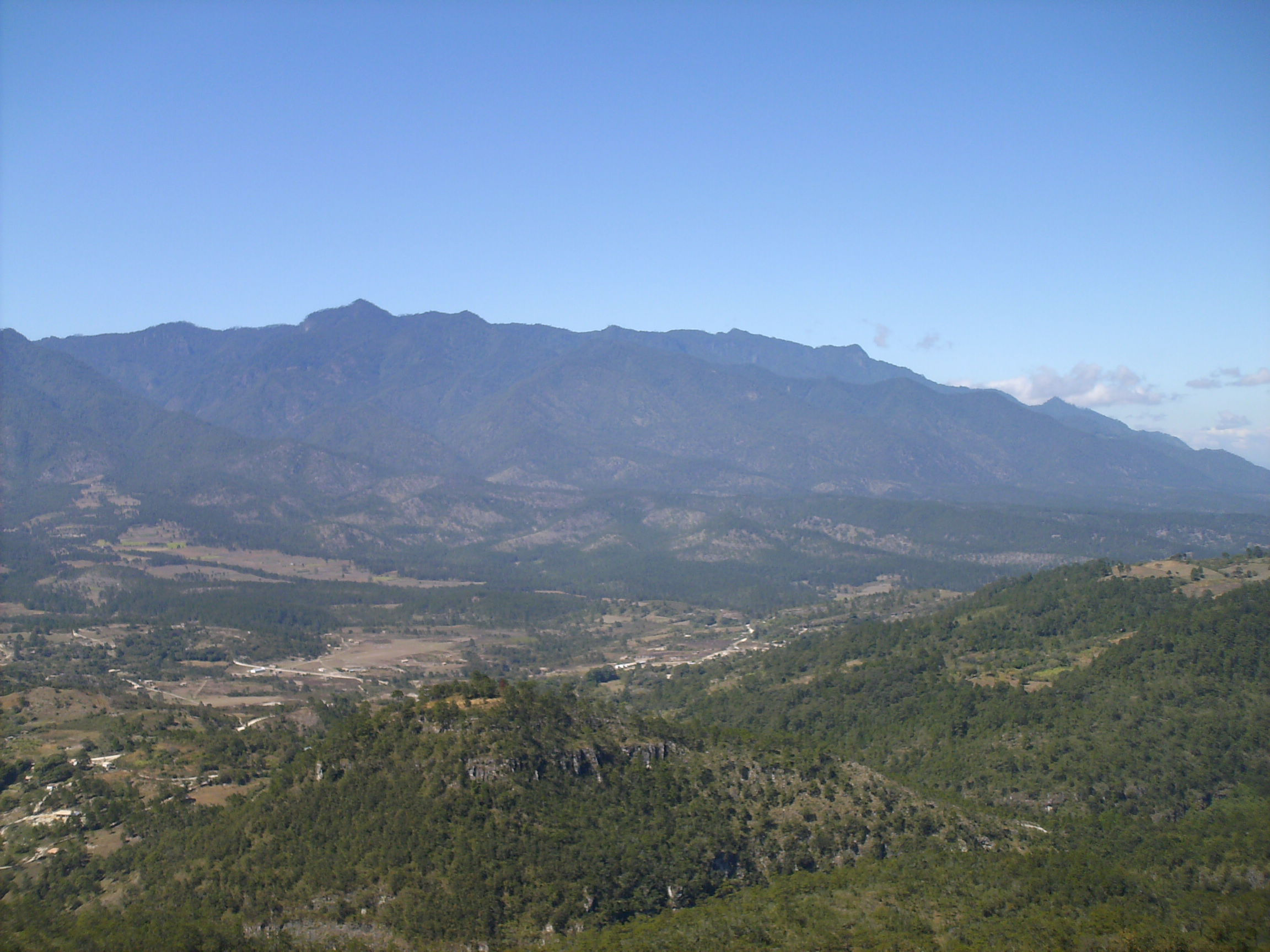
- The Cordillera de Celaque

Highest point
- Elevation: 2,870 m (9,420 ft)
- Prominence: 2,069 m (6,788 ft)
- Listing: North America prominent peaks 90th; Country high point
- Coordinates: 14°32′03″N 88°40′48″W

Geography
- Location within Honduras
- Location: Lempira Department, Honduras
- Parent range: Cordillera de Celaque

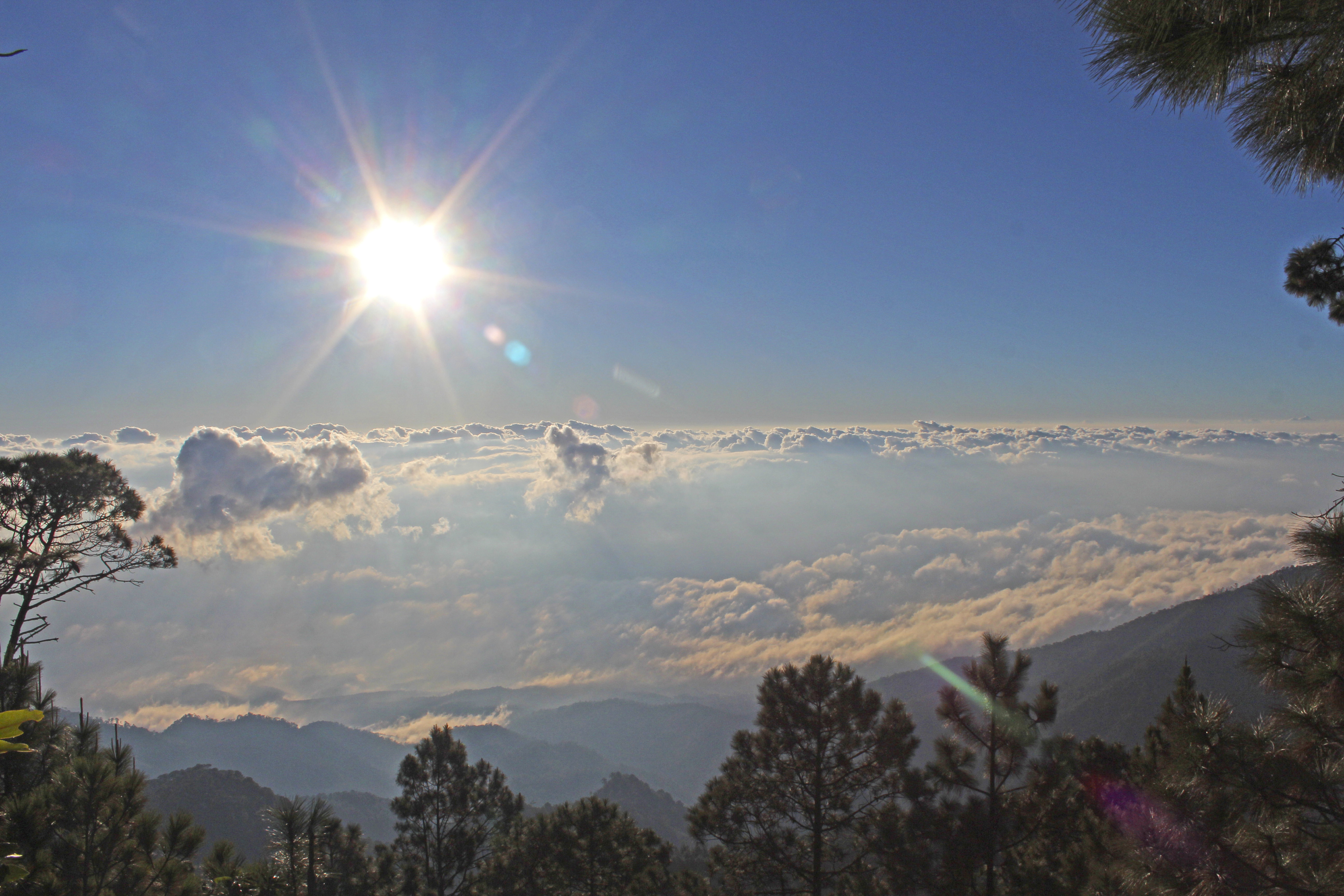
Sunrise at Cerro Las Minas, the highest point in Honduras

Cerro Las Minas is the highest mountain in Honduras. Cerro Las Minas is located in the rugged and relatively isolated Lempira Department in the western part of the country. A Honduran national park, the Celaque National Park, was established in 1987 for the mountain and some 266 square kilometres (65,730 acres) of surrounding territory.

It is part of the Cordillera de Celaque mountain range and is given the name "Pico Celaque, 2849m" on local 1:50,000 topographic mapping, but SRTM data suggests that 2870 m is more accurate.

== Climate ==
Cerro Las Minas have an oceanic subtropical highland climate. (Köppen: Cfb)

Climate data for Cerró Las Minas, elevation 2,800 m (9,200 ft), (1991–2020)
Month	Jan	Feb	Mar	Apr	May	Jun	Jul	Aug	Sep	Oct	Nov	Dec	Year
Record high °C (°F)	26.4 (79.5)	25.2 (77.4)	26.6 (79.9)	24.4 (75.9)	25.0 (77.0)	28.6 (83.5)	25.0 (77.0)	23.6 (74.5)	26.0 (78.8)	25.1 (77.2)	25.6 (78.1)	24.4 (75.9)	28.6 (83.5)
Mean daily maximum °C (°F)	20.1 (68.2)	20.2 (68.4)	19.8 (67.6)	19.5 (67.1)	19.4 (66.9)	18.9 (66.0)	18.5 (65.3)	18.8 (65.8)	19.2 (66.6)	19.4 (66.9)	19.4 (66.9)	19.8 (67.6)	19.4 (66.9)
Daily mean °C (°F)	13.6 (56.5)	14.0 (57.2)	14.1 (57.4)	14.3 (57.7)	14.3 (57.7)	14.2 (57.6)	13.8 (56.8)	13.8 (56.8)	13.8 (56.8)	13.7 (56.7)	13.8 (56.8)	13.7 (56.7)	13.9 (57.0)
Mean daily minimum °C (°F)	6.4 (43.5)	7.6 (45.7)	8.6 (47.5)	9.6 (49.3)	9.6 (49.3)	9.1 (48.4)	8.6 (47.5)	8.4 (47.1)	7.8 (46.0)	8.3 (46.9)	8.6 (47.5)	7.5 (45.5)	8.3 (46.9)
Record low °C (°F)	−3 (27)	−5.2 (22.6)	−3.2 (26.2)	0.0 (32.0)	0.2 (32.4)	1.0 (33.8)	0.4 (32.7)	−1.5 (29.3)	−0.2 (31.6)	0.8 (33.4)	−3.0 (26.6)	−6 (21)	−6 (21)
Average precipitation mm (inches)	46.9 (1.85)	51.4 (2.02)	52.4 (2.06)	48.7 (1.92)	47.0 (1.85)	110.4 (4.35)	105.6 (4.16)	106.3 (4.19)	103.1 (4.06)	108.2 (4.26)	107.2 (4.22)	70.4 (2.77)	957.6 (37.71)
Average precipitation days (≥ 1 mm)	10.9	13.4	13.9	13.4	15.5	20.2	20.5	19.1	19.0	17.1	17.1	17.7	197.8
Average relative humidity (%)	79	79	81	82	82	79	78	77	79	83	83	81	80
Mean monthly sunshine hours	182.9	149.6	136.4	105.0	108.5	117.0	133.3	136.4	123.0	117.8	126.0	158.1	1,594
Mean daily sunshine hours	5.9	5.3	4.4	3.5	3.5	3.9	4.3	4.4	4.1	3.8	4.2	5.1	4.4
Source: Viewweather(https://es.viewweather.com/w2169353-pronostico-del-tiempo-para-cerro_las_minas-departamento_de_lempira.html)
