= Pico Bonito National Park =

National park in Honduras

- IUCN category II (national park)
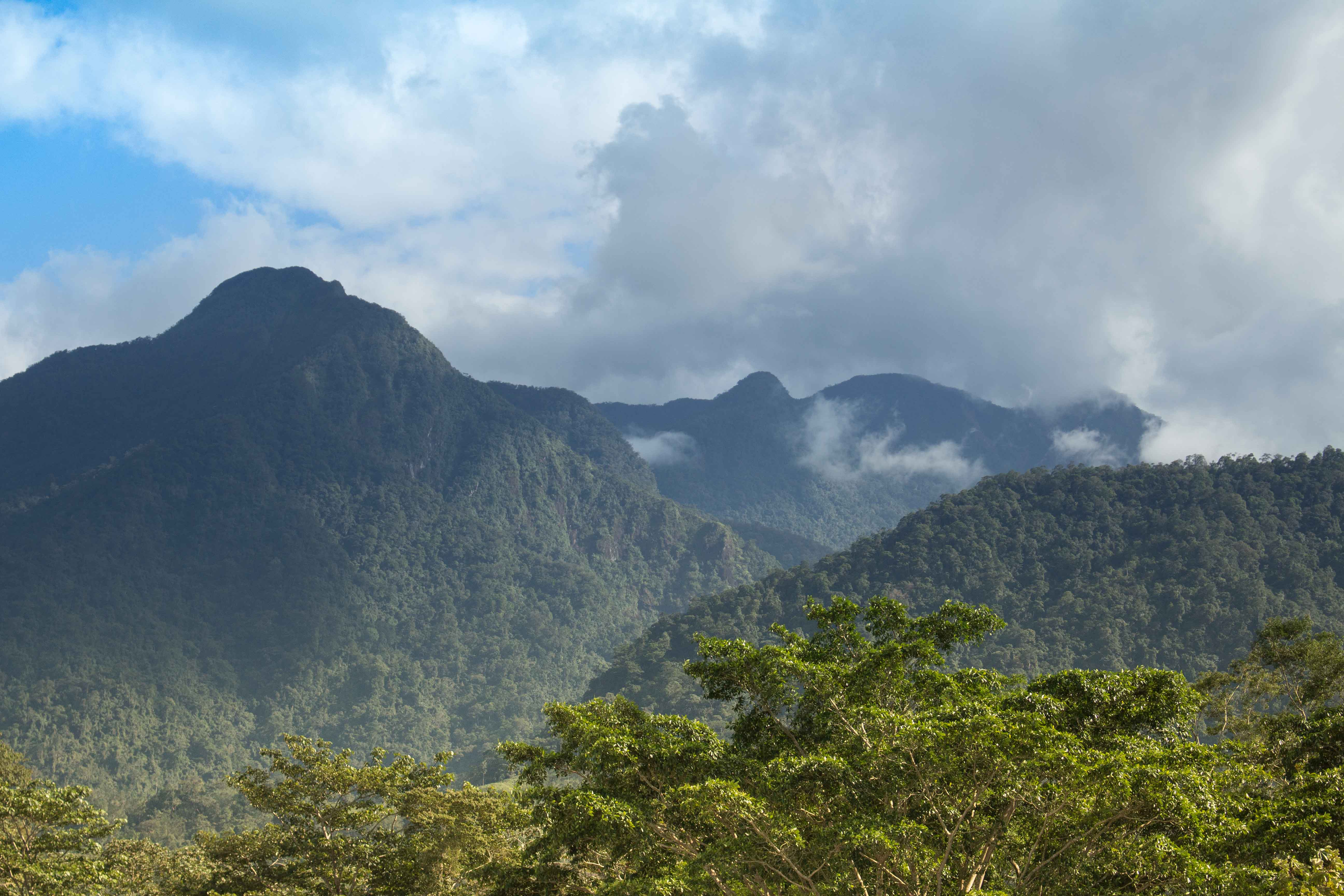
- Pico Bonito National Park, January 2014

- Location within Honduras
- Location: Honduras
- Coordinates: 15°36′35″N 86°52′20″W
- Area: 564.30 km^{2} (217.88 sq mi)
- Established: 1 January 1987

Pico Bonito National Park is a national park in Honduras. It was established on January 1, 1987 and covers an area of 564.30 km^{2} (217.88 sq mi). It has an altitude ranging between 60 and 2,480 meters.

== Description ==
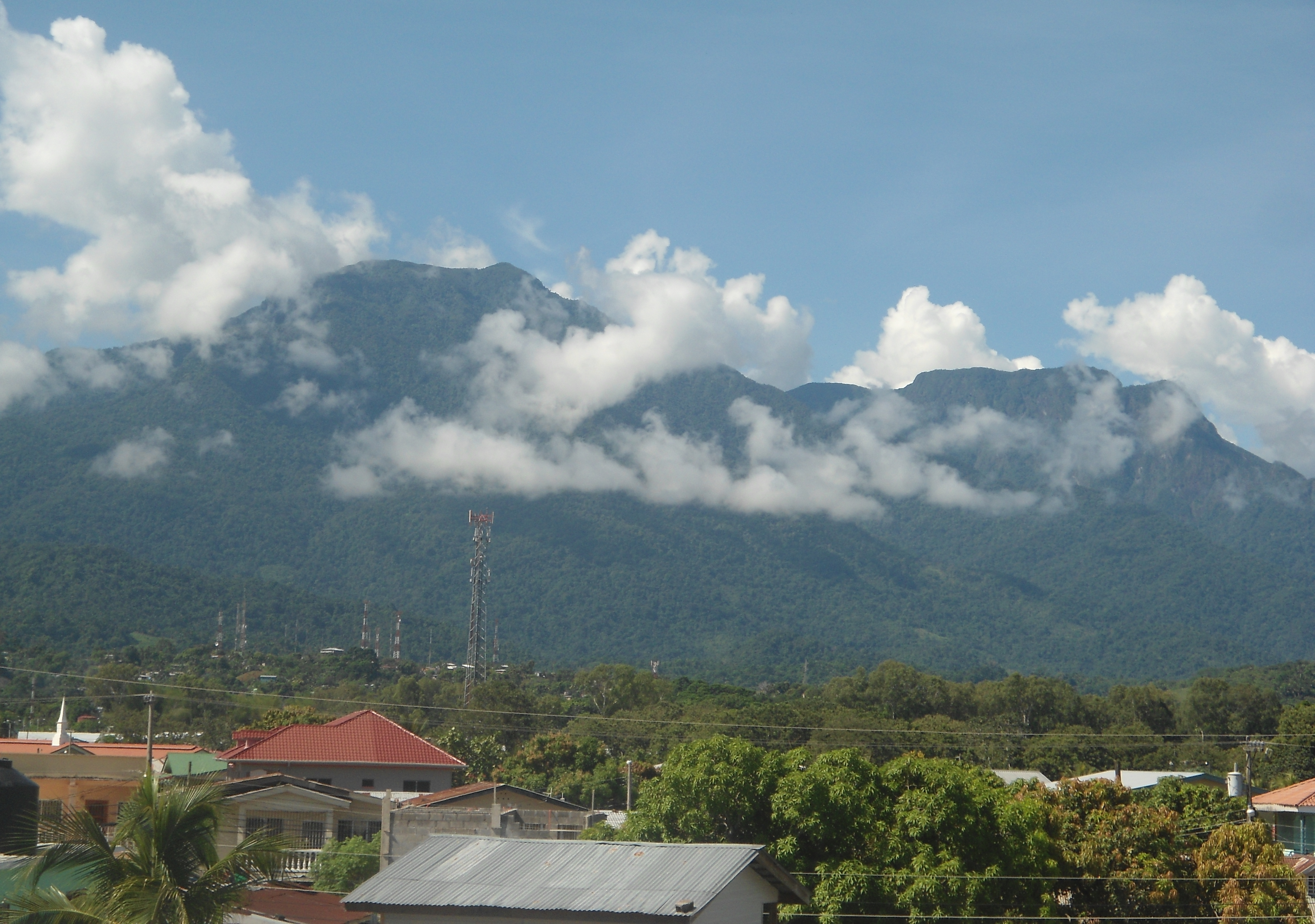
Cordillera Nombre de Dios mountains in Pico Bonito taken from La Ceiba

Pico Bonito National Park is located on the northern area of Honduras, in the mountain range called Cordillera Nombre de Dios, Pico Bonito is a mountain located in the municipality of El Porvenir, near the coastal city of La Ceiba in Honduras. It is part of the Mesoamerican Biological Corridor.

It has a surface area of 1,073 square kilometres including its buffer zone - i.e. approximately 20 x 20 miles or 30 x 35 km.

The management of this protected space is the responsibility of the Pico Bonito National Park Foundation (FUPNAPIB), a non-profit non-governmental organization, which was formed as a legal entity in 1993, by the law 192-93 of the National Congress. Currently there exists an agreement for the co-management between the State Forest Administration (AFE-COHDEFOR) and FUPNAPIB which formalises the actions of the latter organisation.

The Pico Bonito National Park Foundation (FUPNAPIB) has programs in forest protection, the integrated management of resources, environmental education and gender equality. In partnership with the EcoLogic Development Fund and the World Bank’s BioCarbon Fund, FUPNAPIB launched a carbon capture and storage project in 2005. The project aims to mitigate the negative effects of climate change through providing local communities with training and employment opportunities in reforestation and agroforestry.

This area is very popular for the practice of birdwatching, rafting, kayaking and hiking, and a number of tour operators offer transportation, tours and lodging.

As of 2026, it is thought the park supports a jaguar population of 20-50 individuals.

== See also ==
- List of mountain peaks of Central America
