= Cerro Hoya National Park =

National park in Panama

- Parque Nacional Cerro Hoya
- IUCN category II (national park)
- Location within Panama
- Location: Mariato District, Veraguas Province, Panama
- Coordinates: 7°18′N 80°42′W
- Area: 333.4 km^{2} (128.7 sq mi)
- Designation: National Park
- Designated: 1984

Cerro Hoya National Park is a protected area in south-western Panama.

== Geography ==
The park is located in the south-western portion of the Azuero Peninsula. Cerro Hoya (1,559 m (5,115 ft)) is the highest peak in the park, and the park's namesake. The park also contains Punta Mariato, the southernmost point of mainland North America.

== Environment ==
The park protects portions of two ecoregions. The Isthmian-Pacific moist forests cover the lowlands and foothills of the peninsula, while the Talamancan montane forests cover higher elevations above approximately 950 meters elevation, including Cerro Hoya. The montane forests cover 77 km^{2} of the park. These montane forests are an outlier, separated by over 150 km from the main montane forest block further north in the Central Cordillera of Panama and Costa Rica.

=== Fauna ===
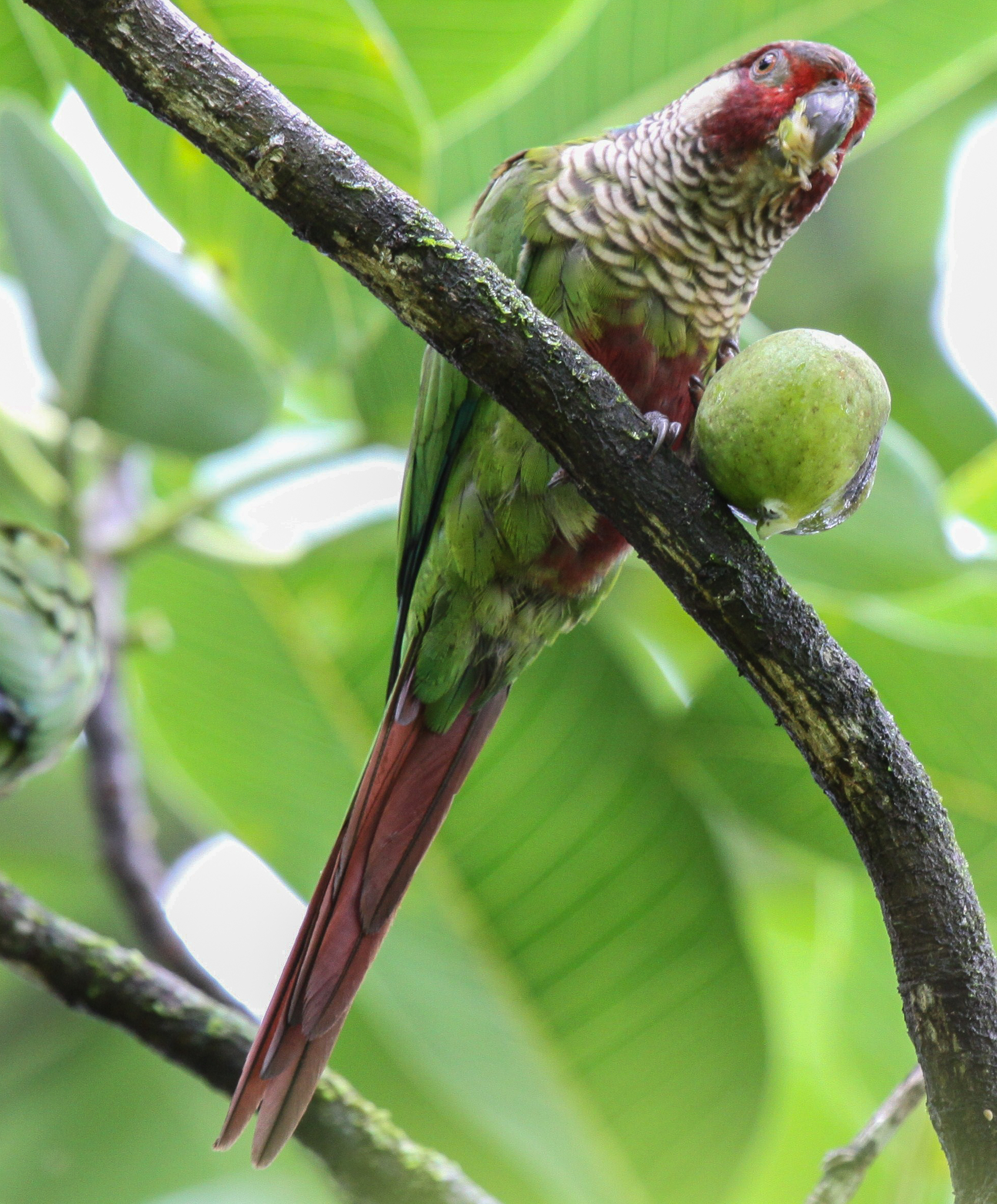
Azuero parakeet

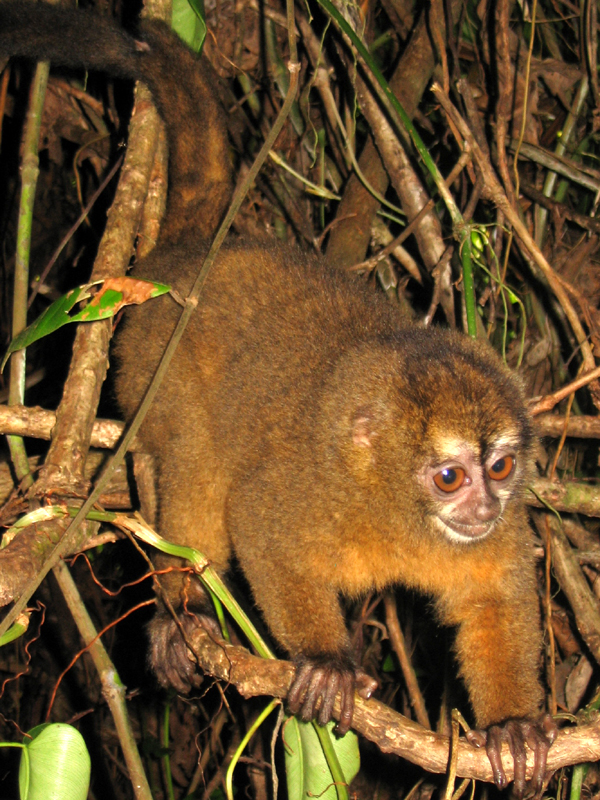
Night monkey

Some 225 species of birds have been recorded in the park. These include populations of crested eagle, Azuero dove, great green macaw, golden-winged warbler, three-wattled bellbird, great curassow and scarlet macaw. The park and its neighboring areas are the sole habitat of the Azuero parakeet, which has a total range of only 700 km^{2}. The park has been designated an Important Bird Area (IBA) by BirdLife International.

Native mammals probably include the jaguar, puma, jaguarundi, ocelot, Neotropical river otter, Panamanian night monkey, Azuero howler, Central American spider monkey, Panamanian spiny pocket mouse, and Darien harvest mouse. The frog Craugastor azueroensis has been recorded.
