= Volcán Tajumulco =

Highest mountain in Guatemala and in all of Central America

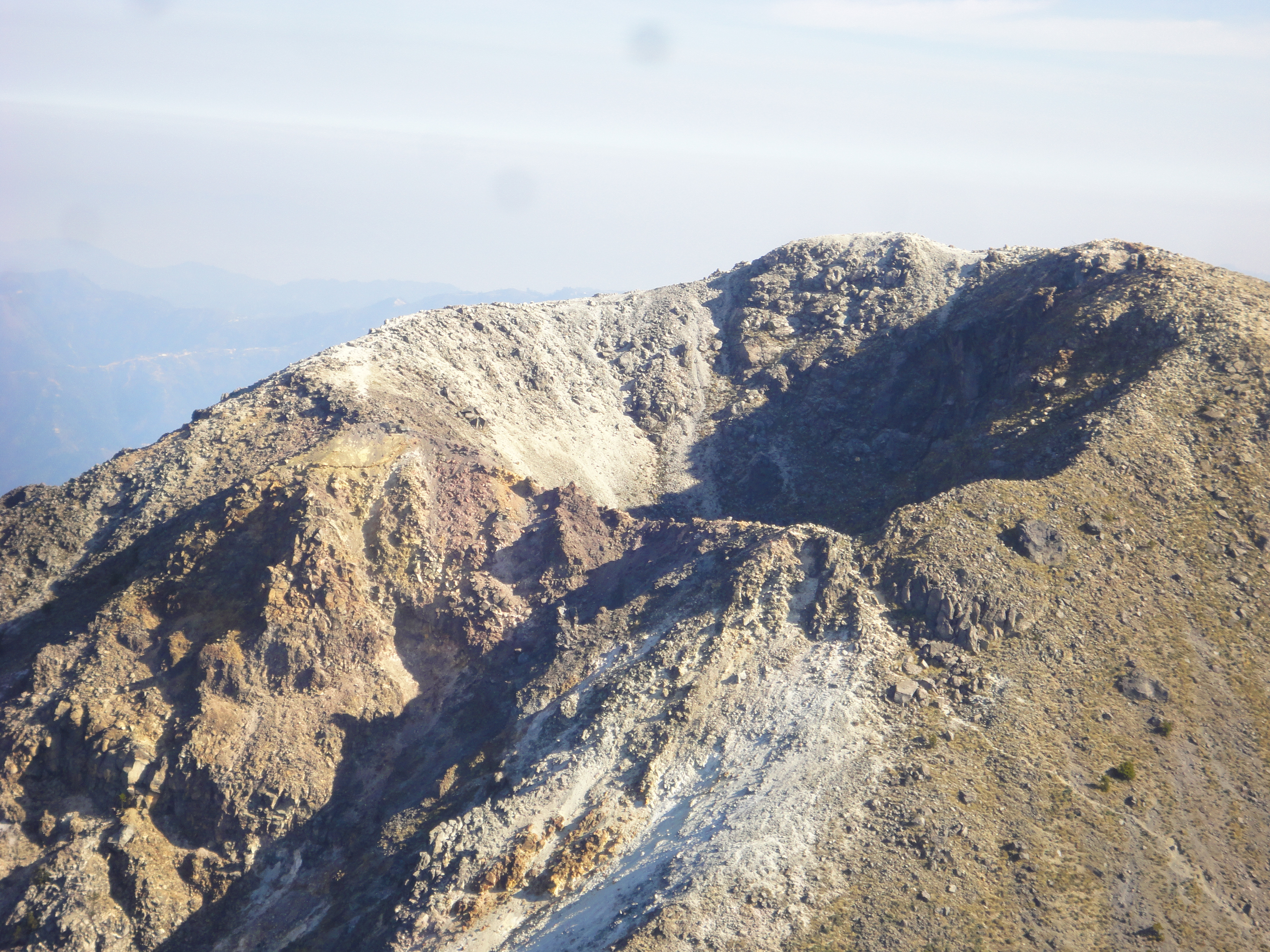
- Crater of the Volcán Tajumulco

Highest point
- Elevation: 4,203 m (13,789 ft)
- Prominence: 3,980 m (13,060 ft)
- Listing: World most prominent peaks 24th; North America highest peak 69th; North America prominent 5th; North America isolated peak 15th; Country high point
- Coordinates: 15°02′37″N 91°54′12″W

Geography
- Location within Guatemala
- Location: Tajumulco, San Marcos Department, Guatemala
- Parent range: Sierra Madre

Geology
- Mountain type: Stratovolcano
- Volcanic arc: Central America Volcanic Arc
- Last eruption: 19th century?

Volcán Tajumulco is a large stratovolcano in the department of San Marcos in western Guatemala. It is the highest mountain in Central America at 4,203 metres (13,789 ft). It is part of the mountain range of the Sierra Madre de Chiapas, which begins in Mexico's southernmost state of Chiapas.

== Description ==
Tajumulco is composed of andesitic-dacitic lavas on the top of a large escarpment of uncertain origin. It has two summits, one of which has a crater 50–70 metres (160–230 ft) wide. A lava flow from the north-western summit descends into a steep valley on the same side of the volcano.

The volcano's eruptive history is unclear and the date of its last eruption unknown. Reports from the 18th and early 19th century claim to record eruptions but these are considered unlikely.

The region around Tajumulco is relatively sparsely populated. The nearest town is San Marcos, located 14 kilometres (8.7 mi) to the south-east. Although it is infrequently visited by tourists, the volcano can be climbed in about five hours from the hamlet of Tuichán. Views are variable as the area is frequently covered in mist and cloud, with conditions at their least favorable between April and September.

== Geomorphology, Ecosystem, and Ascent Routes ==
Tajumulco represents the highest point in Central America and forms part of the volcanic arc of the Sierra Madre de Chiapas. The stratovolcano features two distinct peaks: the eastern primary summit reaching 4,203 meters with a 50-to-70-meter wide crater, and the western secondary peak known as Cerro Concepción (3,800 meters). The surrounding high-altitude ecosystem transitions from sub-alpine pine-oak forests to cold paramo-like grasslands near the summit ridges, supporting specialized flora adapted to severe nocturnal frosts.

Physical and Volcanological Profile of Volcán Tajumulco
Volcanological Feature	Elevation / Technical Parameter	Geomorphological & Ecological Attributes
Peak Elevations	Primary Summit: 4,203 m; Secondary Summit (Cerro Concepción): 3,800 m	Main crater features a 50–70 m diameter basin; secondary cone exhibits eroded lava domes.
Lithology & Volcanism	Andesitic and dacitic lava flows	Stratovolcano constructed over Tertiary metamorphic escarpments with unconfirmed historical eruptions.
Bioclimatic Conditions	Alpine cold climate (4,203 m summit)	Frequent nocturnal frosts (-4 °C to -10 °C) during winter months; high cloud cover from April to September.
Forest Zoning	Sub-alpine conifer forest to zacatonal	Presence of Pinus hartwegii and Abies guatemalensis, transitioning to high-altitude alpine bunchgrasses.
Tuichán Route	Start at ~3,000 m (Tuichán Pass)	1,200 m vertical gradient; standard 5-to-7 hour ascent leading to the inter-peak saddle and crater rim.

== See also ==
- List of mountain peaks of North America
  - List of mountain peaks of Central America
    - List of volcanoes in Guatemala
- List of elevation extremes by country
