= Cerro Tacarcuna =

Mountain in Panama

- Location within Panama

Highest point
- Elevation: 1,875 m (6,152 ft)
- Prominence: 1,770 m (5,810 ft)
- Coordinates: 8°9′57″N 77°17′45″W

Geography
- Location: Panama

Cerro Tacarcuna is a mountain located in the Darién Province of Panama, very close to the Colombia–Panama border. With a height of 1,875 m (6,152 ft) above sea level, it is the highest point in the Serranía del Darién.

== Overview ==
The tropical forests of Cerro Tacarcuna are recognized for their extremely high biodiversity and for presenting a large number of endemisms. They are protected by the Darién National Park and the Los Katíos National Park in Colombia and Panama respectively.

According to Kuna mythology, this ethnic group considers that the Cerro Tacarcuna, or Dakarkunyala in the Tule language, is the original place of origin and that from there they spread throughout the Darién and the San Blas archipelago (Caribbean Sea, in Panama); the hill is 1,875 meters above sea level.
