= Acatenango =

Stratovolcano in Guatemala

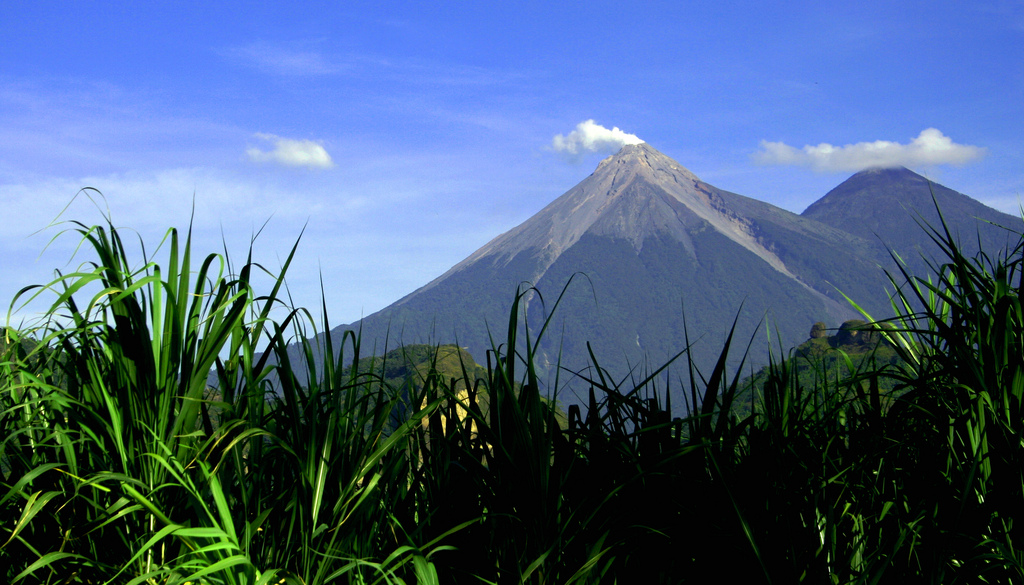
- Volcán de Fuego (left) and Acatenango (right)

Highest point
- Elevation: 3,976 m (13,045 ft)
- Prominence: 1,835 m (6,020 ft)
- Coordinates: 14°30′03″N 90°52′33″W

Geography
- Location within Guatemala
- Location: Guatemala
- Parent range: Sierra Madre

Geology
- Rock age: 200 Kyr
- Mountain type: Stratovolcano
- Volcanic arc: Central America Volcanic Arc
- Last eruption: November to December 1972

Acatenango is a stratovolcano in Guatemala, close to the city of Antigua. It is part of the mountain range of the Sierra Madre. The volcano has two peaks, Pico Mayor (Highest Peak) and Yepocapa (3,880 m) which is also known as Tres Hermanas (Three Sisters). Acatenango is joined with Volcán de Fuego and collectively the volcano complex is known as La Horqueta.

Climbing Acatenango is one of Guatemala's most notable tourist attractions; several outfitters have built base camp with cabins for hikers to visit on an overnight trek to view eruptions of Fuego.

== Description ==
The Fuego-Acatenango massif comprises a string of five or more volcanic vents along a north–south trend that is perpendicular to that of the Central American Volcanic Arc in Guatemala. From north to south, known centres of volcanism are Ancient Acatenango, Yepocapa, Pico Mayor de Acatenango, Meseta, and Fuego. Volcanism along the trend stretches back more than 200,000 years. Although many of the centres have been active contemporaneously, there is a general sequence of younger volcanism, from north to south along the trend.

This massive volcano complex towers more than 3,500 metres above the Pacific coastal plain to the south and 2,000 metres above the Guatemalan Highlands to the north. The volcano complex comprises remnants of multiple eruptive centres, which periodically have collapsed to form huge debris avalanches. The largest of these avalanches extended more than 50 kilometres from its source and covered more than 300 square kilometres.

The following table synthesizes the eruptive centers, geomorphological parameters, and volcanic hazard zones across the Fuego-Acatenango volcanic complex:

Structural and Eruptive Profile of the Acatenango Volcanic Massif
Eruptive Center / Vent	Elevation & Prominence	Primary Lithology & Products	Historical / Prehistoric Activity	Associated Geologic Hazards
Ancient Acatenango	Collapse remnant (~3,500 m)	Andesite lava flows and debris	Prehistoric (>80,000 BP)	Massive collapse scarp; source of regional debris avalanches (>300 km²).
Yepocapa (North Peak)	3,880 m (12,730 ft)	Andesite and dacite lavas, pyroclastic fall	Active ~5,000 BP; phreatic eruption in Dec 1972	Ashfall and lahares descending into Chimaltenango drainage basins.
Pico Mayor (Summit)	3,976 m (13,045 ft)	Basaltic-andesite tephra, volcanic bombs	Explosive eruptions 1,900 & 2,300 BP; phreatic activity 1924–1927	Summit ballistic showers, pyroclastic flows, and flank collapse threats.

== Eruption history ==
The only known historical eruptions of Acatenango volcano occurred in the 20th century, between 1924 and 1927 from just north of the summit peak (Pico Mayor) and again in December 1972 from the saddle between Yepocapa and Pico Mayor. These phreatic explosions generated ballistic volcanic bombs that fell near the summit craters and fine volcanic ash that fell up to 25 km away.

In prehistoric time, Acatenango has erupted explosively to form widespread fall deposits, hot pyroclastic flows and lava flows. There have been numerous eruptions during the past 80,000 years from vents along the massif. The most recent explosive eruptions of Acatenango occurred 1,900 years ago (Pico Mayor), 2,300 years ago (Pico Mayor) and about 5,000 years ago (Yepocapa). If such eruptions were to recur, many people and costly infrastructure would be at risk.

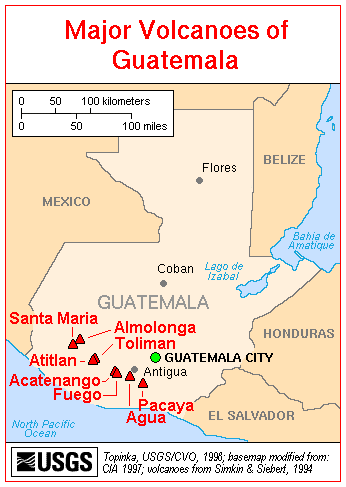
Major Volcanoes of Guatemala

== Economy ==
The Acatenango Valley is a designated coffee-producing region of Anacafé.

== Gallery ==
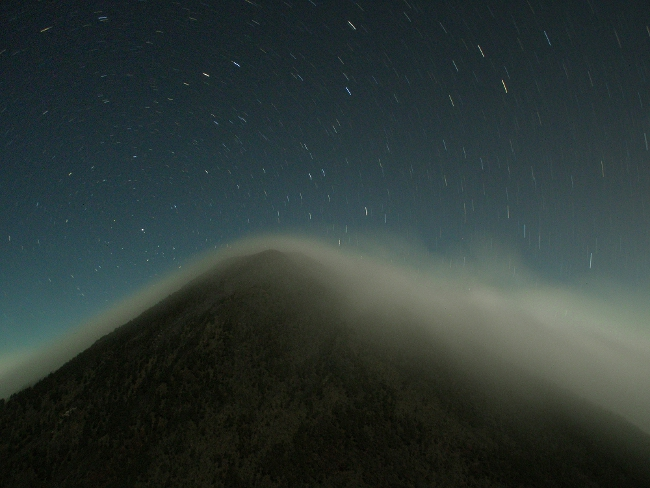
Volcan de Acatenango, seen at night from Volcan de Fuego.

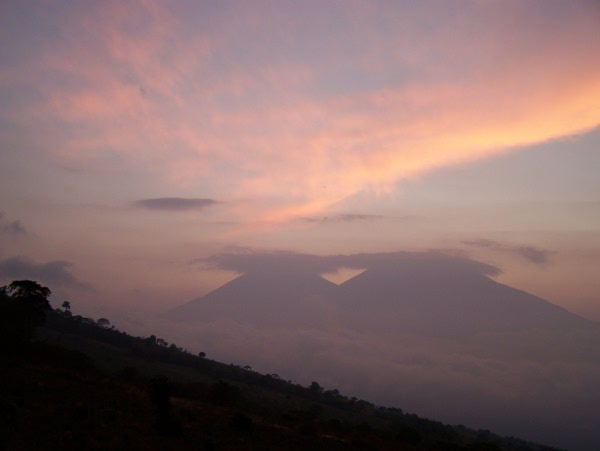
Sunset behind Acantenago and Fuego, seen from the lower north side of Volcan de Agua.

== See also ==
- List of volcanoes in Guatemala
- Mountain peaks of North America
- List of stratovolcanoes
