= Sierra Madre de Chiapas =

Mountain range in Central America

Sierra Madre
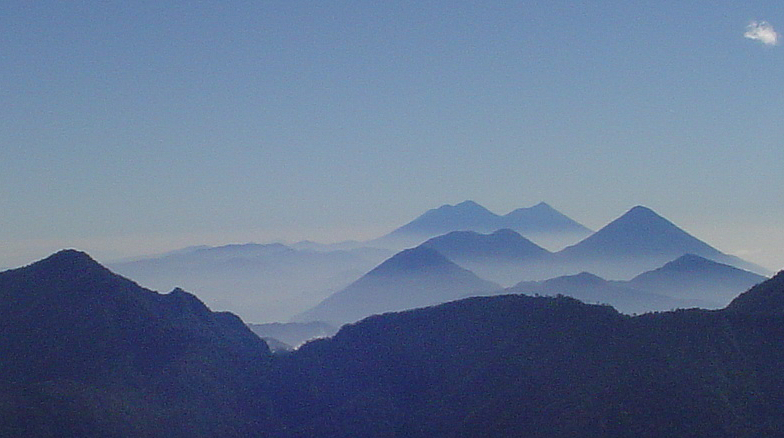
- Volcanoes of the Sierra Madre in Guatemala

Highest point
- Peak: Volcán Tajumulco, Guatemala
- Elevation: 4,220 m (13,850 ft)
- Coordinates: 15°2′37″N 91°54′11″W

Geography
- Location within Central America Location within North America
- Countries: Mexico, Guatemala, El Salvador and Honduras
- Range coordinates: 15°30′N 92°36′W

Geology
- Orogeny: Central America Volcanic Arc

The Sierra Madre is a major mountain range in Central America. It is known as the Sierra Madre de Chiapas in Mexico. It crosses Mexico, Guatemala, El Salvador and Honduras. The Sierra Madre is part of the American Cordillera, a chain of mountain ranges that consists of an almost continuous sequence of mountain ranges that form the western "backbone" of North America, Central America, and South America.

== Geography ==
The range runs northwest–southeast from the state of Chiapas in Mexico, across western Guatemala, into El Salvador and Honduras. Most of the volcanoes of Guatemala, part of the Central America Volcanic Arc, are within the range.

A narrow coastal plain lies south of the range, between the Sierra Madre and the Pacific Ocean. To the north lie a series of highlands and depressions, including the Chiapas Depression, which separates the Sierra Madre from the Chiapas Plateau, the Guatemalan Highlands, and Honduras' interior highlands.

The range forms the main drainage divide between the Pacific and Atlantic river systems. On the Pacific side the distance to the sea is short, and the streams, while very numerous, are consequently small and rapid. A few of the streams of the Pacific slopes rise in the Guatemalan Highlands, and force a way through the Sierra Madre at the bottom of deep ravines. On the eastern side a number of the rivers of the Atlantic slopes attain a considerable volume and size.

The Sierra Madre moist forests ecoregion covers the southern slopes of the mountains. The mountains intercept winds from the Pacific, creating fog, clouds, and orographic precipitation that sustain the ecoregion's cloud forests. The Central American pine–oak forests ecoregion covers the Sierra's high peaks and northern slopes.

=== Regional names ===
It is known near Guatemala city as the Sierra de las Nubes, and enters Mexico as the Sierra de Istatan. Its summit is not a well-defined crest, but is often rounded or flattened into a table-land. The direction of the great volcanic cones, which rise in an irregular line above it, is not identical with the main axis of the Sierra itself, except near the Mexican frontier, but has a more southerly trend, especially towards El Salvador.

=== Volcanoes ===
The base of many of the volcanic igneous peaks rests among the southern foothills in the southern region of the range. It is, however, impossible to subdivide the Sierra Madre into a northern and a volcanic chain; for the volcanoes are isolated by stretches of comparatively low country; at least thirteen considerable streams flow down through them, from the main watershed to the sea. Viewed from the coast, the volcanic cones seem to rise directly from the central heights of the Sierra Madre, above which they tower; but in reality their bases are, as a rule, farther south.

East of Volcán Tacana (4,092 metres) which marks the Mexican frontier, the principal volcanoes are Tajumulco (4,220 meters); Santa Maria (3,777 meters), which erupted in October 1902, after centuries of quiescence, in which its slopes had been overgrown by dense forests; Atitlan (3,557 meters), overlooking Lake Atitlan; Acatenango (3,976 meters); Fuego (i.e. "fire," 3,763 metres), which received its name from its activity at the time of the Spanish conquest; Agua (i.e. "water," 3,765 meters), so named in 1541 because it destroyed the former capital of Guatemala with a deluge of water from its flooded crater; and Pacaya (2,550 metres), a group of igneous peaks which were in eruption in 1870. East of the Guatemalan border, the range forms the boundary between El Salvador and Honduras. In El Salvador, the volcanoes form a line well south of the range, where over twenty volcanoes form five clusters. Between the Sierra Madre and the Volcanic line lies a central plateau.

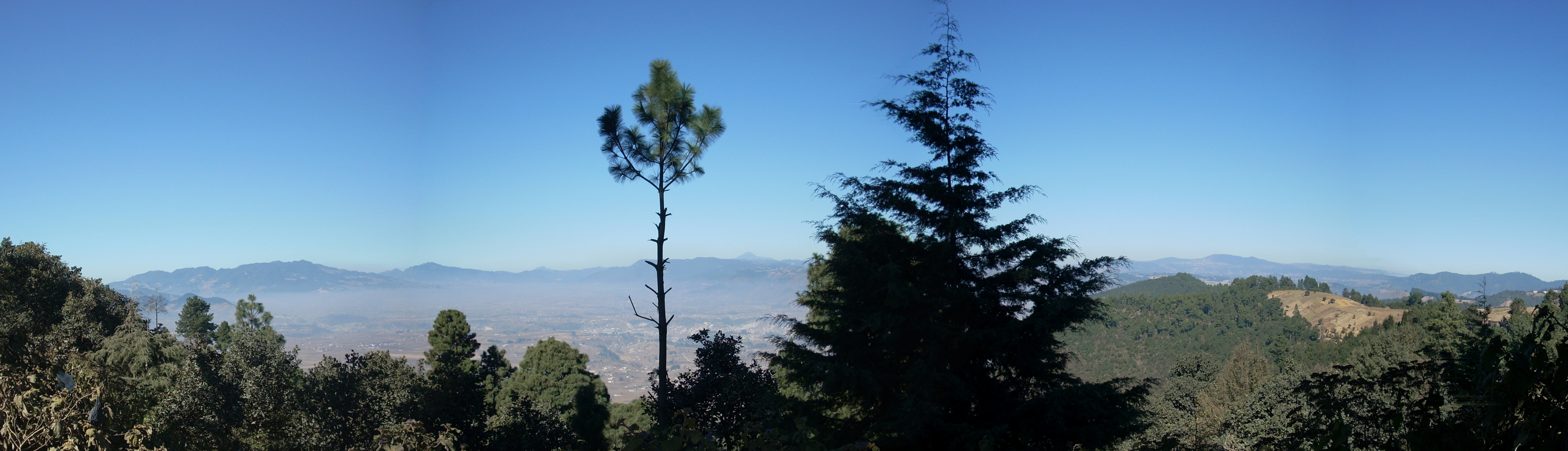
Sierra Madre de Chiapas in distance, near Quetzaltenango in Guatemala.
The mountain at left is the Volcán Siete Orejas (left) and Volcán Tajumulco (center).

== See also ==
- Geography of Mesoamerica
- Sierra Madre de Chiapas topics
