= Desarrollo Forestal Montreal =

Nature reserve in Costa Rica

Desarrollo Forestal Montreal S.A.
- Interactive map of Desarrollo Forestal Montreal S.A.
- Location: Costa Rica
- Nearest city: Alajuela
- Coordinates: 10°12′38.55″N 84°6′56.99″W
- Area: Over 592 hectares (5.92 square kilometers/2.28 square miles)
- Established: 1997
- Governing body: Private

Desarrollo Forestal Montreal S.A. is a nature reserve and cloud forest adjacent to Braulio Carrillo National Park in the central area of Costa Rica, about 30 miles (48 km) north of San José. The area is located between 1600–1800 meters (5,249–5,905 ft.) above sea level and extends throughout the mountain range.

Temperatures range between 12 °C–18 °C (53.6 °F–64.4 °F), and the area's average temperature is 15 °C (59 °F). Soil conditions in the area are significantly diverse, and the reserve's annual precipitation has been estimated at 3,707 mm (146 inches). The area's dry season occurs for 30 to 45 days.

The evergreen forest canopy in the reserve has an average height of 24–40 metres (79–131 feet), and has a significant amount of epiphytes, palms and shrubs.

== History and overview ==
In early 1944, Costa Rican businesspersons Raúl Gurdián Rojas and Ramón Madrigal Antillón partnered with Spanish businessperson Pablo Funtanet Solsona and acquired a property in the area of La Legua, Barba, located in San Rafael, Vara Blanca. Over three decades, the property's primary forest was preserved. During this time cattle pasturing occurred, which did not exceed more than 100 hectares (247 acres).

In 1979, partners in Cordilleras Centrales Elena, Raúl, Rodolfo, and Cristina Gurdián Montealegre acquired Madrigal and Funtanet's shares. By that time, the extension of the property had been reduced to 610 hectares (1,507 acres).

Also in 1979, under the Forestry Incentive Law that was established on May 8, 1978, Raúl and Rodolfo Gurdián Montealegre formed the company Ahorro Forestal de Costa Rica and acquired 50% of the Cordilleras Centrales shares to later subscribe reforestation contracts. The reforestation project subsequently began and a 7.5-kilometre (4.6-miles) road was built with its respective bridges communicating San Rafael, Vara Blanca, with the forested areas of the property and edge of the Braulio Carrillo National Park.

Forestry expert Jorge Rodríguez Quirós became the project director, and oversaw development, in which he recommended the repopulation of pastures with commercial trees such as alder (Alnus acuminata) and white cedar (Cupressus lusitanica), in order to encourage the breeding and eventual transplanting of these trees to open fields. Repopulation initially occurred the existing pasture areas and some primary forest areas. The planted forest area reached 150 hectares (371 acres), and was abandoned in 1989, after which the subscribed contracts were suspended. The project was deemed a failure due to the replacement of indigenous trees with non-indigenous trees, the latter of which had adaptation problems.

In 1997 the property was delegated under the Voluntary Forest Regime, and in 1998 the first Environmental Services Contract was signed using the National Forestry Finance Fund (Fondo Nacional de Financiamiento Forestal-FONAFIFO), which was supervised by the Central Volcanic Mountain Range Foundation (Fundación para el Desarrollo de la Cordillera Volcánica Central-FUNDECOR). As of 2012, there are 592 hectares (1462.86 acres) assigned to the Environmental Services Program (Payment for ecosystem services), which comprises 97% of the property's total area.

== Flora and fauna ==
=== Flora ===
Some of the arboreal species that can be seen are the oak (Quercus oocarpa), wooly-leaved sapote (Casimiroa tetrameria), gum tree (Sapium oligoneuron), quizarrá amarrillo (Phoebe mollicela), limoncillo (Zanthoxyllum limoncillo), burío (Heliocarpus appendiculatus), uruca (Trichilia glabra) and guijarros (Stenmadenia glabra).

=== Fauna ===
Jaguars, the only Panthera species found in the Americas, have been seen at Desarrollo Forestal Montreal S.A. The jaguar can range across a variety of forested and open habitat, but is strongly associated with the presence of water.

Fauna species that inhabit the area include the jaguar, Hoffman's two-toed sloth, nine-banded armadillo, Baird's tapir, gray fox, coyote, oncilla, ocelot, red brocket, white-nosed coati, resplendent quetzal, black guan, great curassow, Costa Rican salamander, swallow-tailed kite, emerald toucanet, violet sabrewing, tayra, mountain thrush, sooty thrush, three-wattled bellbird and the black-faced solitaire.

== Community relations ==
The forest located in the property is considered a protection priority by the Mesoamerican Biological Corridor (GRUAS Project) because of the importance of its flora and fauna. Conserving these wooded areas is important since they are part of a biological corridor for the Braulio Carrillo National Park. This corridor serves as a bridge for the area's fauna that contribute to the dispersing of seeds and pollen from species of flora, which are, in turn, responsible for the biodiversity of the region. In addition, the land is an important part of the watershed for the San Fernando and Volcán rivers, which form part of the Volcán and Don Pedro hydroelectric projects.

== Significance of cloud forests ==
Cloud forests, also known as fog forests, have unique characteristics and biodiversity due to their frequent cloudy/foggy conditions. In 1970, the original extent of cloud forests on the Earth was around 50 million hectares. Population growth, poverty and uncontrolled land use have contributed to the loss of cloud forests. The 1990 Global Forest Survey found that 1.1% of tropical mountain and highland forests were lost each year, which was higher than in any other tropical forests. For example, in Colombia, one of the countries with the largest area of cloud forests, only 10-20% of the initial cloud forest cover remains. Significant areas have been converted to plantations, or for use in agriculture and pasture. Significant crops in montane forest zones include tea and coffee, and the logging of unique species causes changes to the forest structure.

In 2004, it was estimated that one-third of all cloud forests on the planet were protected at that time.

== See also ==
- Forest ecology
- Organization for Tropical Studies
- Protected area
- Tropical ecology
- Braulio Carrillo National Park
- Varablanca
- Carbon offset

== Notes ==
=== References ===
- Bruijnzeel, L.A.; Hamilton, L.S. (2000). Decision Time For Cloud Forests: Water-Related Issues And Problems Of The Humid Tropics And Other Warm Humid Regions. Paris, France: UNESCO's IHP Humid Tropics Programme Series No.13.
- Häger, A., 2006, Einfluss von Klima und Topographie auf Struktur, Zusammensetzung und Dynamik eines tropischen Wolkenwaldes in Monteverde, Costa Rica, Göttingen: Dissertation Georg August Universität Göttingen
