= 1963 in Costa Rica =

- Decades: 1940s; 1950s; 1960s; 1970s; 1980s
- See also: Other events of 1963; Timeline of Costa Rican history

Events in the year 1963 in Costa Rica.

== Incumbents ==
- President – Francisco Orlich Bolmarcich (National Liberation Party).

== Events ==
=== March ===
- 13 March – The Irazú Volcano overlooking San José erupted powerfully and began a cycle of abnormal activity that lasted nearly two years, ending on 13 February 1965.
- 18 March – The president of the United States John F. Kennedy began a three-day visit to Costa Rica to meet with the presidents of Central America to promote his Alliance for Progress programme to resist the influence of communism, from Cuba and the Soviet Union, by providing American economic aid to promote economic development and political reform in Latin America.
