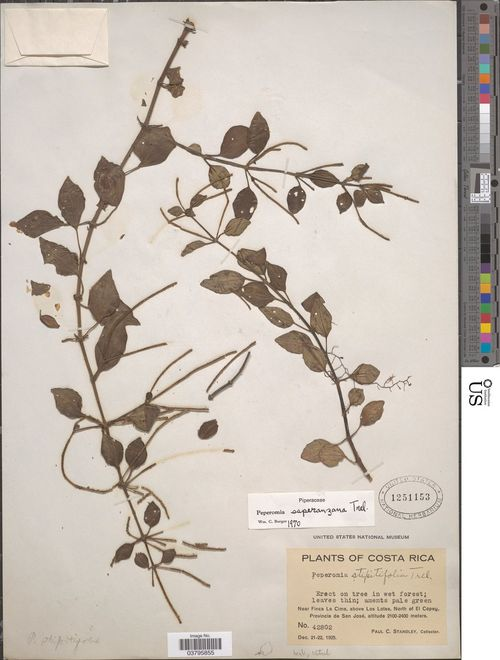

Scientific classification
- Kingdom: Plantae
- Clade: Tracheophytes
- Clade: Angiosperms
- Clade: Magnoliids
- Order: Piperales
- Family: Piperaceae
- Genus: Peperomia
- Species: P. esperanzana

Binomial name
- Peperomia esperanzana Trel.

= Peperomia esperanzana =

Species of epiphyte

Peperomia esperanzana is a species of epiphyte in the genus Peperomia that is endemic in Costa Rica and Panama. It grows on wet tropical biomes. Its conservation status is Threatened.

== Description ==
The type specimen was collected in La Esperanza, Costa Rica.

Peperomia esperanzana is a rather large, divaricately branched herb that grows on trees. The stem is moderately stout at 2 to 4 millimeters thick, densely covered with crisped or wavy hairs, or becoming nearly hairless. The leaves are opposite, round or orbicular in shape, measuring 1 to 1.5 centimeters in diameter, with rather obscure 5 nerves. They are sometimes crisped-hairy at the base and along the nerves. The petiole is scarcely 3 millimeters long and crisped-hairy. The spikes grow at the stem tips and from the leaf axils, measuring 2 by 40 to 60 millimeters, with rather loosely spaced flowers and stout false stalks. The peduncle is about 5 millimeters long and hairless. The floral bracts are round and shield-shaped (peltate). The berries are round with a small point. The stigma is oblique.

== Taxonomy and naming ==
It was described in 1929 by William Trelease in Contributions from the United States National Herbarium 6. The epithet esperanzana refers to La Esperanza.

== Distribution and habitat ==
It is endemic in Costa Rica and Panama. It grows as an epiphyte and is a herb. It grows on wet tropical biomes.

== Conservation ==
This species is assessed as Threatened.
