= 1963 eruption of Irazú Volcano =

Volcanic Eruption in Costa Rica

1963 Eruption of Volcán Irazú
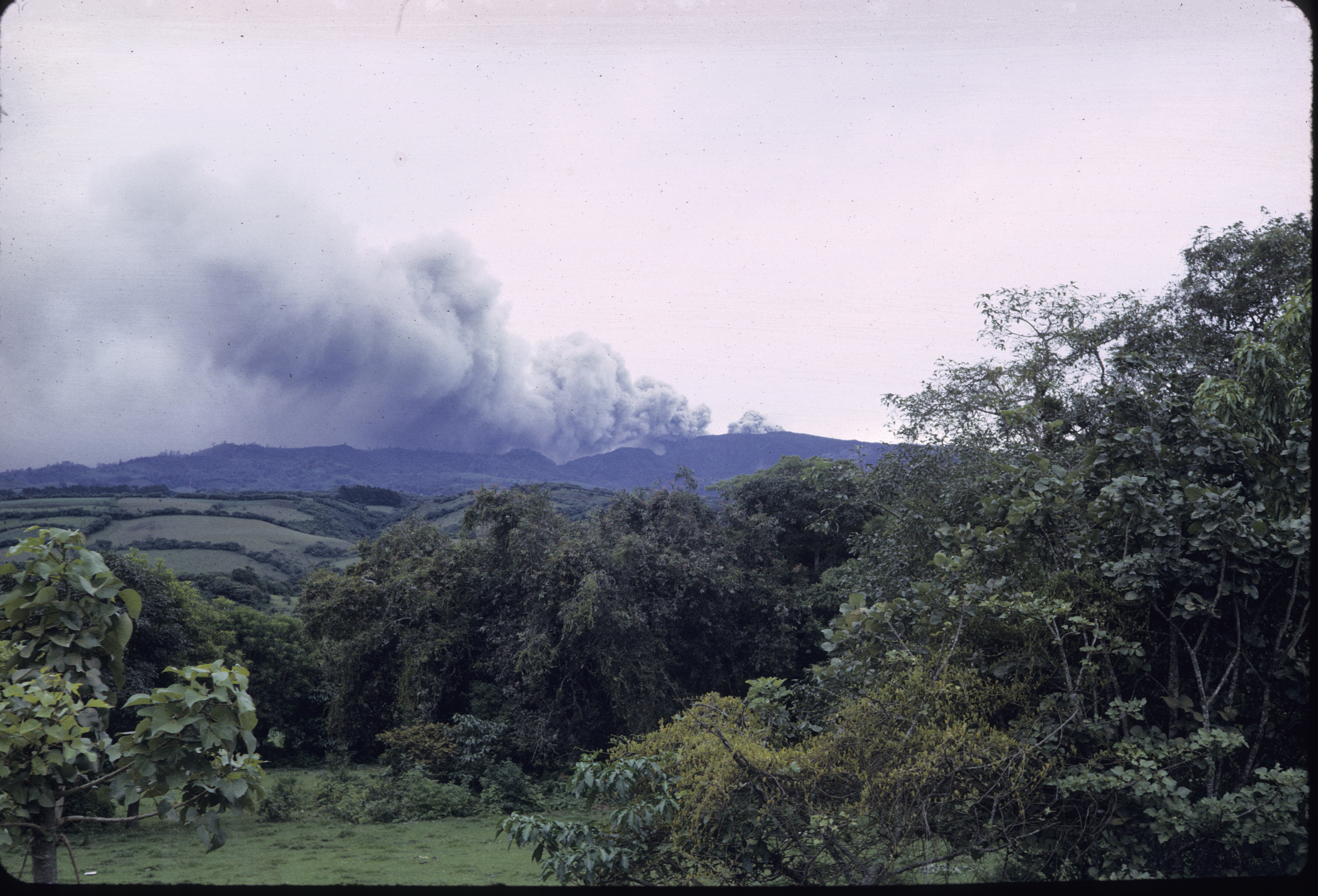
- Eruption column ash in July 1963
- Volcano: Irazú Volcano
- Start date: March 13, 1963
- End date: February 13, 1965
- Type: Vulcanian eruption
- Location: Cordillera Central, Cartago, Costa Rica; 9.9827926°N 83.8497705°W
- VEI: 3
- Impact: 20 people died; Over 400 homes were destroyed; Many animals, such as cows and horses, died; Very destructive lahar in Río Reventado; Changed temporarily the climate in Cartago

The 1963 eruption of Irazú Volcano in the Cordillera Volcánica Central was one of the most powerful eruptions in Costa Rica, especially for his destructive lahar. Signs of reactivation began in 1961 in the form of microseisms; previously, several specialists warned that the Irazú Volcano could explode at any time.

== First eruption ==
The first eruption happened on March 13, 1963. It was a powerful explosion that surprised a large part of the country just when John F. Kennedy was making a state visit to Costa Rica in San José, a thin layer of ash fell on everyone, including Kennedy. A famous phrase that John F. Kennedy said when he saw the situation of the eruption was: "Don't ask yourself what your country can do for you, ask yourself what you can do for your country". More ash began to head to the city of San José, where there was so much ash that people covered themselves with handkerchiefs and umbrellas and were forced to sweep the streets.

== The lahar ==
On December 9, 1963, the most catastrophic event of the eruption, known in Spanish as La Noche Gris (The Grey Night), was when a lahar slid down the Reventado River, destroying everything in its path, including trees and some buildings in rural areas, and killing livestock such as cows and horses. Huge rocks came down the river, and when they collided, sparks could be seen, provoked by the size of the stones, accompanied by a mighty noise.

The river overflowed when it arrived close to Cartago City, causing even more damage. It destroyed houses and roads, leaving everything covered in mud and ash. Many emergency services arrived at the scene to try to rescue people stuck in their destroyed homes.

=== End of eruption ===
The eruptions slowly stopped until finally, on February 13, 1965, 2 years and 11 months after the start of the eruptions, the volcano stopped erupting. Irazu Volcano caused deaths and damaged houses, fields, livestock, and streets. It is remembered by many as a tragedy.
