= Sucio River =

River in Costa Rica

Coordinates: 10.46768°N 83.96936°W

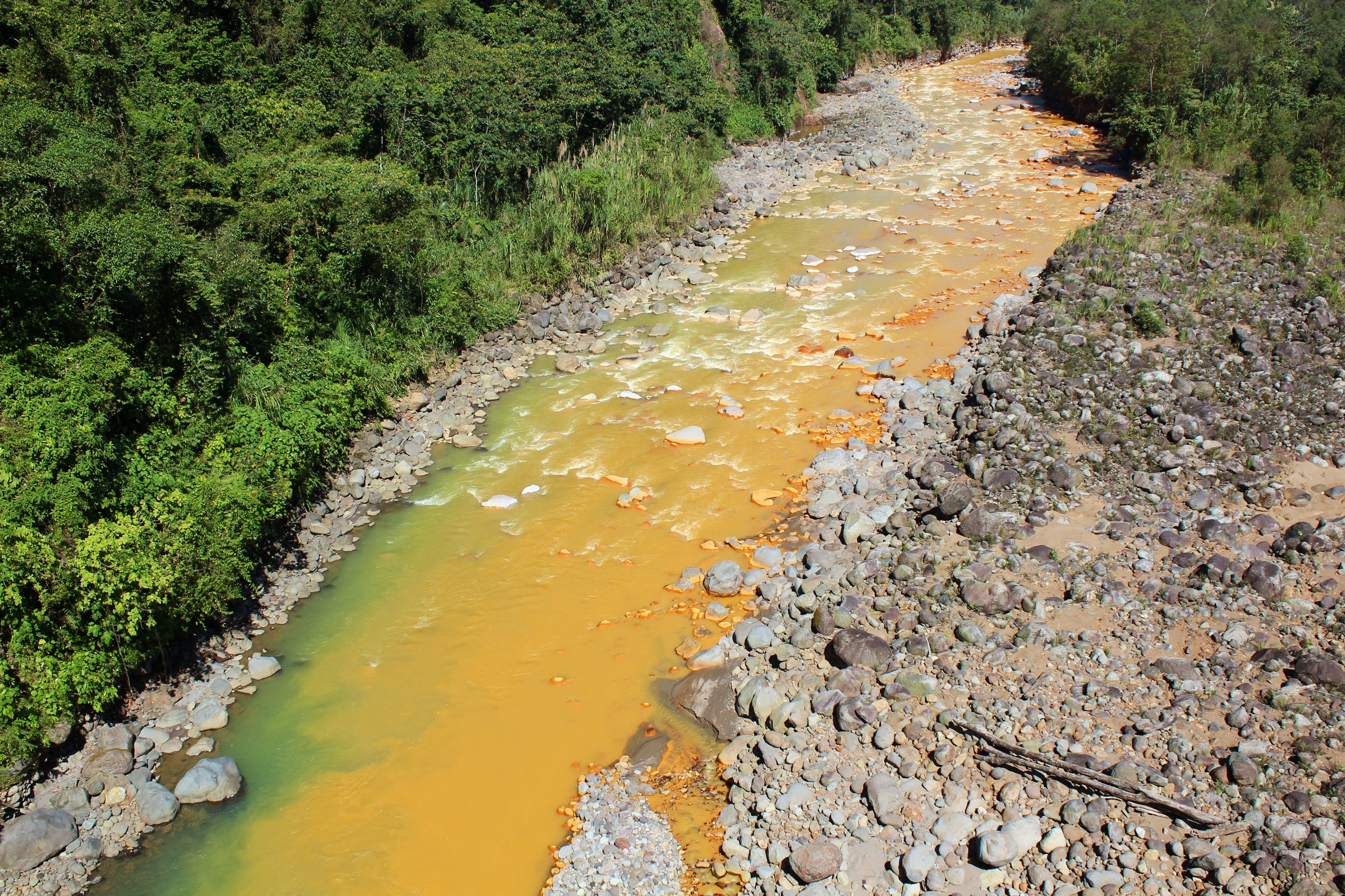
Sucio River passing through Braulio Carrillo National Park

The Sucio River (Spanish: Río Sucio, lit. 'dirty river') is a river of Costa Rica. The river gets its name from the sulfur deposits found on the Irazú Volcano, which give the waters a brownish color. It is a tributary of the Río San Juan. The Sucio River begins half a kilometer from the top of the Irazú Volcano, converging with the Sarapiquí River at the town of Boca Rio Sucio, where both rivers flow into the San Juan River, and then into the Caribbean Sea. One of the Sucio's branches merges with the Patria River to form the Chirripo Norte River, a tributary of the Colorado River.
