= 1960 in Costa Rica =

- Decades: 1940s; 1950s; 1960s; 1970s; 1980s
- See also: Other events of 1960; Timeline of Costa Rican history

Events in the year 1960 in Costa Rica.

== Incumbents ==
- President: Mario Echandi Jiménez

== Deaths ==
- June 1 - Teodoro Picado Michalski
