= Braulio Carrillo National Park =

National park in Costa Rica

- IUCN category II (national park)
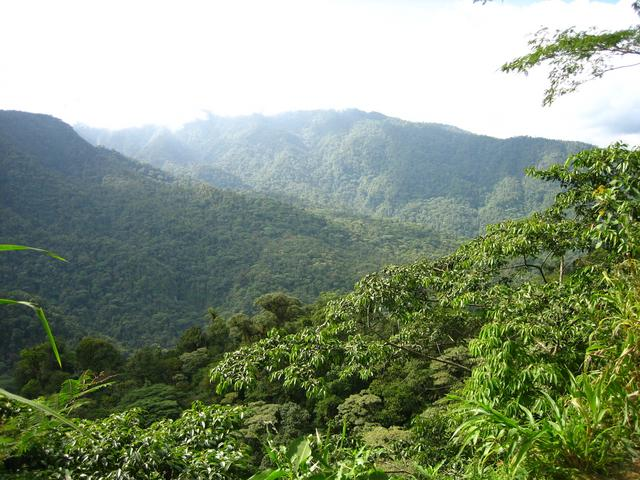
- Patria Canyon, Braulio Carrillo National Park
- Braulio Carrillo National Park
- Location: Heredia Province, Cartago Province, Limón Province, and San José Province, Costa Rica
- Nearest city: San José
- Coordinates: 10°09′35.64″N 83°58′27.93″W
- Area: 475.8 km^{2} (183.7 sq mi)
- Established: 1978
- Governing body: National System of Conservation Areas (SINAC)
- Location in Costa Rica

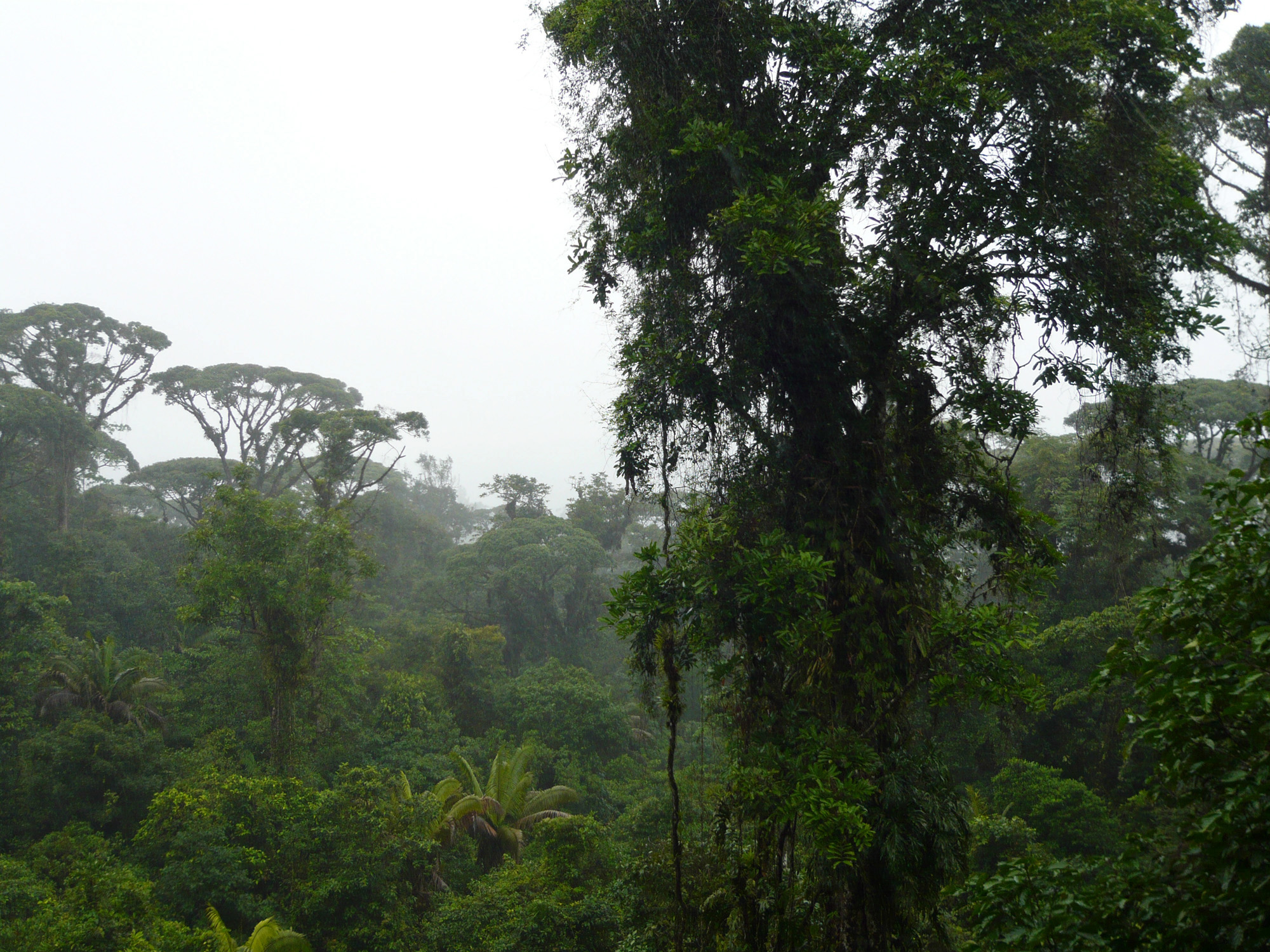
Talamancan montane forests in the park.

Braulio Carrillo National Park is a national park in Heredia Province, Cartago Province, Limón Province and San José Province, in central Costa Rica. It is part of the Central Conservation Area.

== Geography ==
The park is located on the volcanic Cordillera Central (Central mountain range) between San José city and Puerto Limón on the Caribbean.

It is accessible from the Limon Highway, which bisects the park (northwest to southeast), and from Barva canton on the north.

The park is separated into three main sectors — Zurquí, Quebrada Gonzales, and Barva.

== History ==
Established in 1978, the park was formed as an agreement with environmental lobbyists to limit and prevent development of the area after the construction of the Limon Highway, a major road linking the capital to the Caribbean cargo port of Puerto Limón. The park was named after former Costa Rican president Braulio Carrillo, whose administration had helped foster the nation's early agricultural economy and had built the first road linking San José to the Caribbean coast.

== Natural history ==
The park contains many notable geological features, such as the Barva Volcano; and several dormant volcanoes including Cerro Chompipe, Cerro Cacho Negro, and Cerros las Tres Marias. The Barva sector has three crater lakes — Barva, Danta, and Copey.

The park also protects areas of the Sarapiquí River watershed, including large amounts of primary cloud and rainforest, and the flora and fauna that makes it their home. Others in the park include the Hondura River, Patria River, and the mineral-colored Súcio River.

=== Biodiversity ===
Both the large size (108,970 acres) of Braulio Carrillo National Park, and its varied altitude of 3,000 metres (9,800 ft) between the highest and lowest points, make it home to several WWF ecoregions. Ranging from high-altitude cloud forests to lowlands tropical rainforest, it has one of the highest levels of biodiversity in Costa Rica. More than 90% of the park is covered in primary forest.

The park contains landscapes representing the WWF ecoregions of Talamancan montane forests at high elevations and the Isthmian–Atlantic moist forests at low elevations. It is significant for its biodiversity with 600 identified species of trees, over 530 species of birds, and 135 species of mammals catalogued.

The area near Barva is home to the elusive frog Pristimantis altae, and the venomous snake bushmaster, which is classified as Near Threatened on the IUCN Red List. Examples of birds found include the solitary eagle, the bare-necked umbrellabird, as well as several species of hummingbirds.

== Recreation ==
Unlike the more popular Costa Rican parks, such as Poás Volcano National Park and Manuel Antonio National Park, Braulio Carrillo National Park is relatively unmaintained and untravelled. Three main ranger stations serve the park. Two of them, Quebrada Gonzales and Barva, provide sanitary facilities and drinking water for visitors.

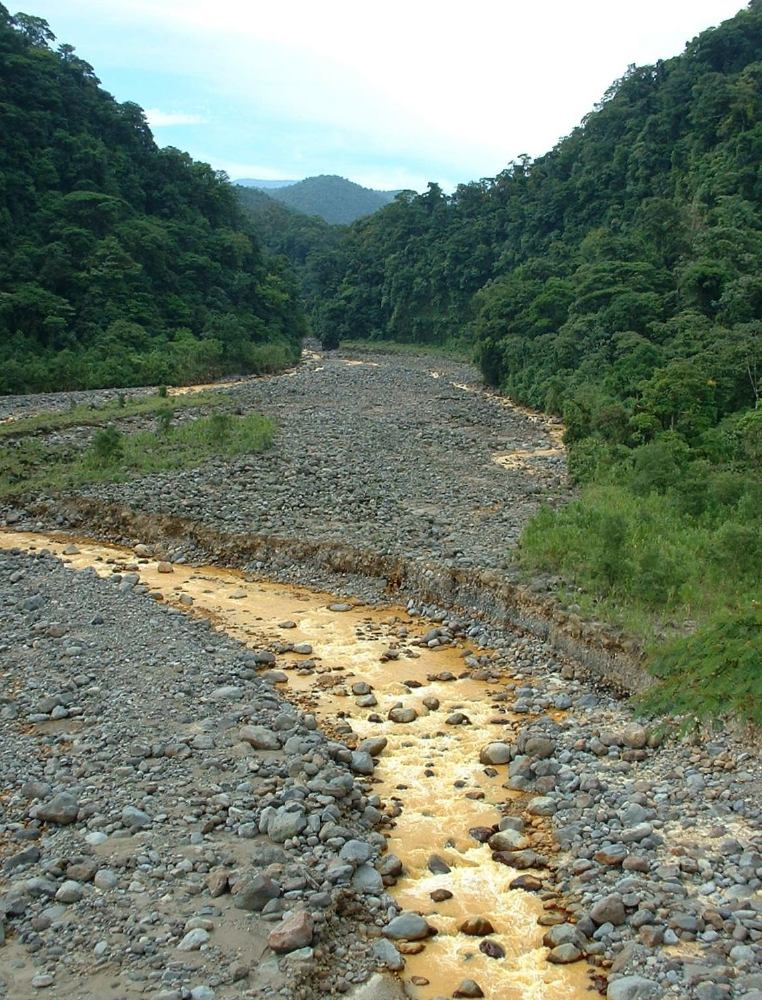
Súcio River, during dry weather in the park.

=== Hiking ===
There are several available hiking trails in Braulio Carrillo National Park, which can be narrow and are not regularly monitored by park rangers. The trail from Puesto Barva to the La Selva Protected Zone in the park's north is a difficult and long route. It can take over 4 days to traverse the entire length.

Other shorter trails include Los Botarramas and El Ciebo, both between 1–2 kilometres (0.62–1.24 mi) long. They have steep sections with panoramic views.

== See also ==
- Desarrollo Forestal Montreal
- National parks of Costa Rica
- Protected areas of Costa Rica
