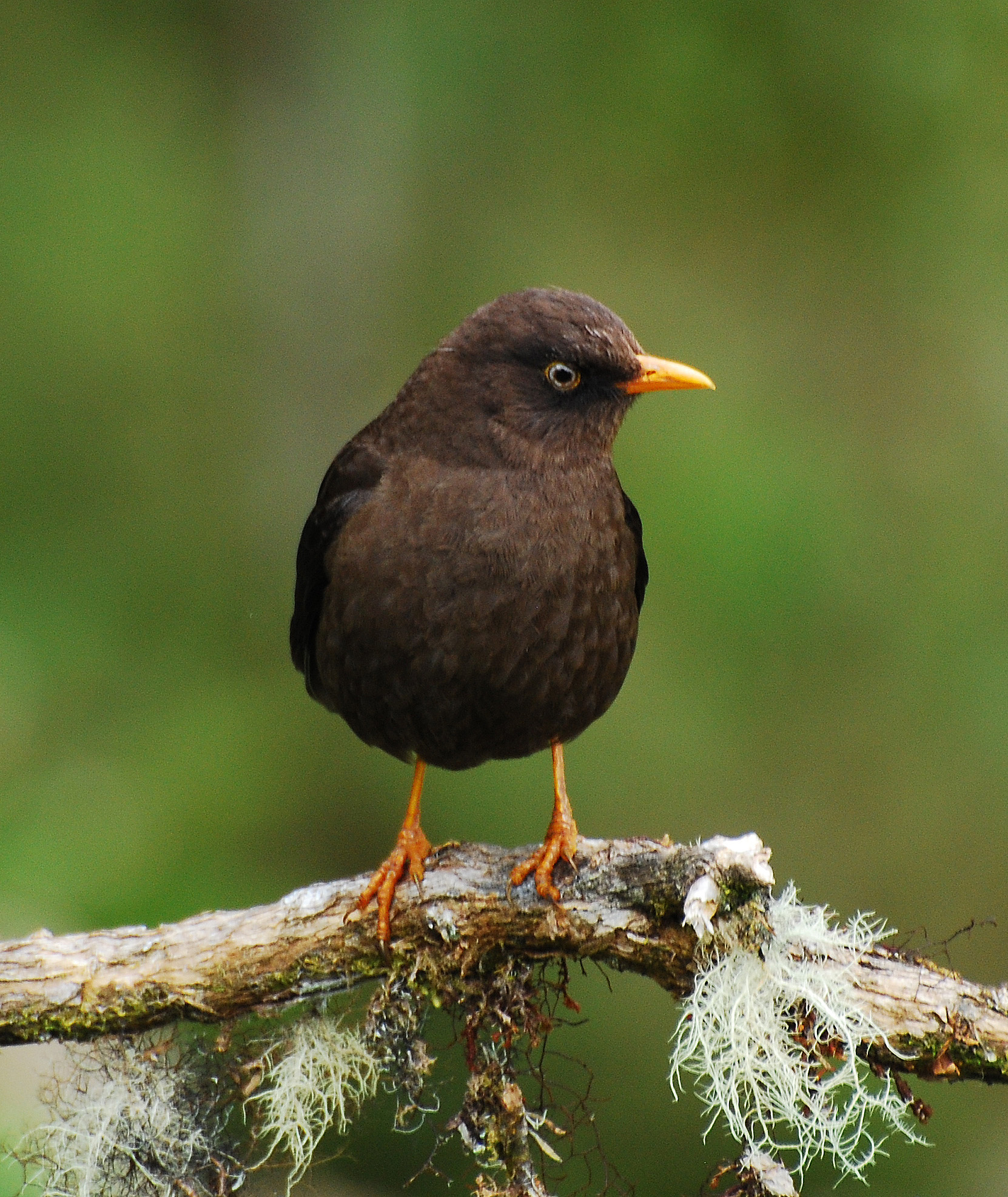

Conservation status
- Least Concern (IUCN 3.1)

Scientific classification
- Kingdom: Animalia
- Phylum: Chordata
- Class: Aves
- Order: Passeriformes
- Family: Turdidae
- Genus: Turdus
- Species: T. nigrescens

Binomial name
- Turdus nigrescens Cabanis, 1861

= Sooty thrush =

Species of bird

The sooty thrush (Turdus nigrescens) is a species of bird in the family Turdidae, the thrushes and allies. It is found in Costa Rica and Panama. It was formerly known as the sooty robin.

== Taxonomy and systematics ==
The sooty thrush was originally described in 1861 with its current binomial Turdus nigrescens. It is monotypic.

== Description ==
The sooty thrush is 24 to 25.5 cm (9.4 to 10 in) long and weighs about 96 g (3.4 oz). The species is sexually dimorphic. Adult males have a mostly brownish black head and body with sooty black lores and an orange eye-ring. Their wings and tail are also sooty black. Adult females resemble males but are browner overall and sometimes have some darker streaks on the throat. Both sexes have a white iris, a yellow-orange bill, and orange legs and feet. Juveniles have dark brown upperparts with buff streaks and buff underparts with dark brown spots. They have a white chin, a pale iris, and a brownish yellow bill, legs, and feet. The superficially similar mountain thrush (T. plebejus) shares its range but is uniformly brown with dark bare parts. It also resembles the slaty-backed nightingale-thrush (Catharus fuscater) but there is no range overlap.

== Distribution and habitat ==
The sooty thrush has a disjunct distribution. It is found in Costa Rica's Cordillera Central and Cordillera de Talamanca; the latter range extends into far western Panama's Chiriquí Province. In the Cordillera Central it occurs on volcanos separated by low passes, and a major valley separates them from the Cordillera de Talamanca.

The sooty thrush inhabits the edges of montane evergreen forest, semi-humid to humid montane scrublands, and second-growth scrublands in the subtropical and temperate zones. The scrubby areas include páramo, bogs, and pastures. In elevation it ranges from 2,150 to 3,500 m (7,100 to 11,500 ft) but is most common above 2,400 m (7,900 ft).

== Behavior ==
=== Movement ===
The sooty thrush is mostly a year-round resident but some movements to lower elevations following the breeding season have been reported.

=== Feeding ===
The sooty thrush feeds on a variety of insects, spiders, and fruits and berries. It forages mostly on the ground in open areas and along the forest edge. It pokes into grass clumps and flips leaves with its bill. It usually forages in small loose flocks.

=== Breeding ===
The sooty thrush breeds between March and May in Costa Rica. It makes a bulky cup nest from twigs, rootlets, lichens, and mosses lined with fine grasses and sometimes incorporating mud. It typically is in a tall shrub or tree between about 2 and 8 m (7 and 26 ft) above the ground. The clutch is two greenish blue eggs. The incubation period, time to fledging, and details of parental care are not known.

=== Vocalization ===
The sooty thrush's song is "relatively poor, a series of short phrases each repeated 3–6 times with a few seconds’ pause...chuweek chuweek chuweek...seechrrrzit seechrrrzit seechrrrzit...tseeur tseeu tseeur tseeur". Its calls include a "distinctive low grating grrrek or trrrr" that is often repeated, a "thin rolling prrreee", and a "harsh tchweerp, tchweerp".

== Status ==
The IUCN has assessed the sooty thrush as being of Least Concern. It has a small range; its estimated population of between 20,000 and 50,000 mature individuals is believed to be stable. No immediate threats have been identified, though shifting and alteration of its habitat due to climate change is expected in the future. It is considered common above 2,400 m (7,900 ft) in Costa Rica and uncommon to fairly common in Panama with higher numbers at higher elevation.

== Gallery ==
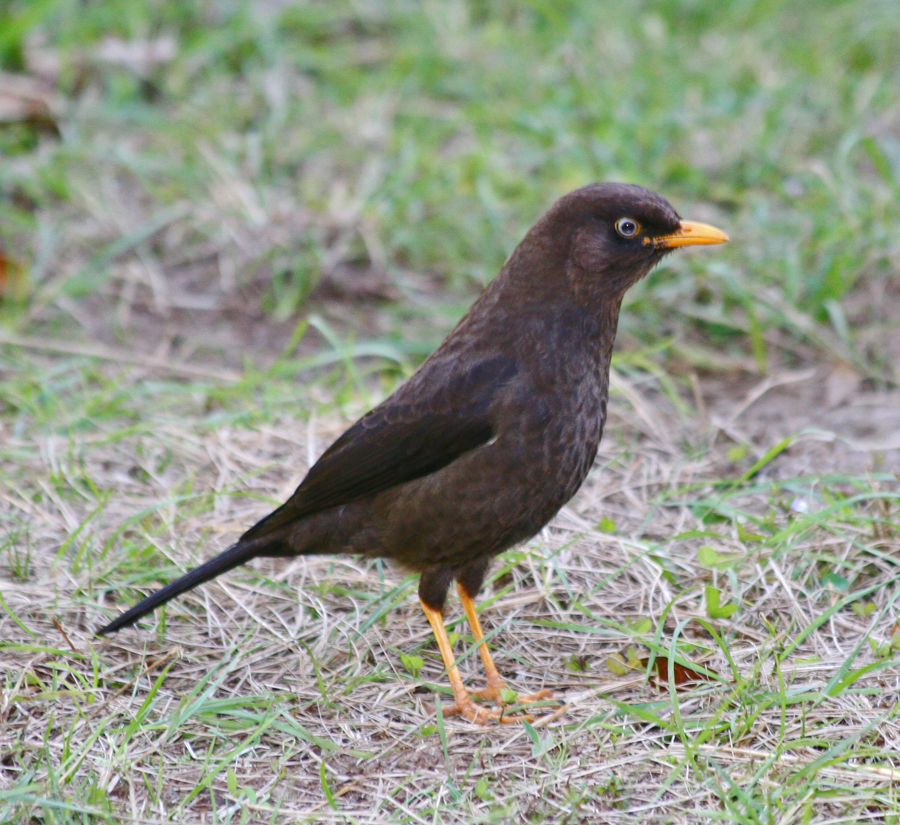
In the Savegre Valley, Costa Rica

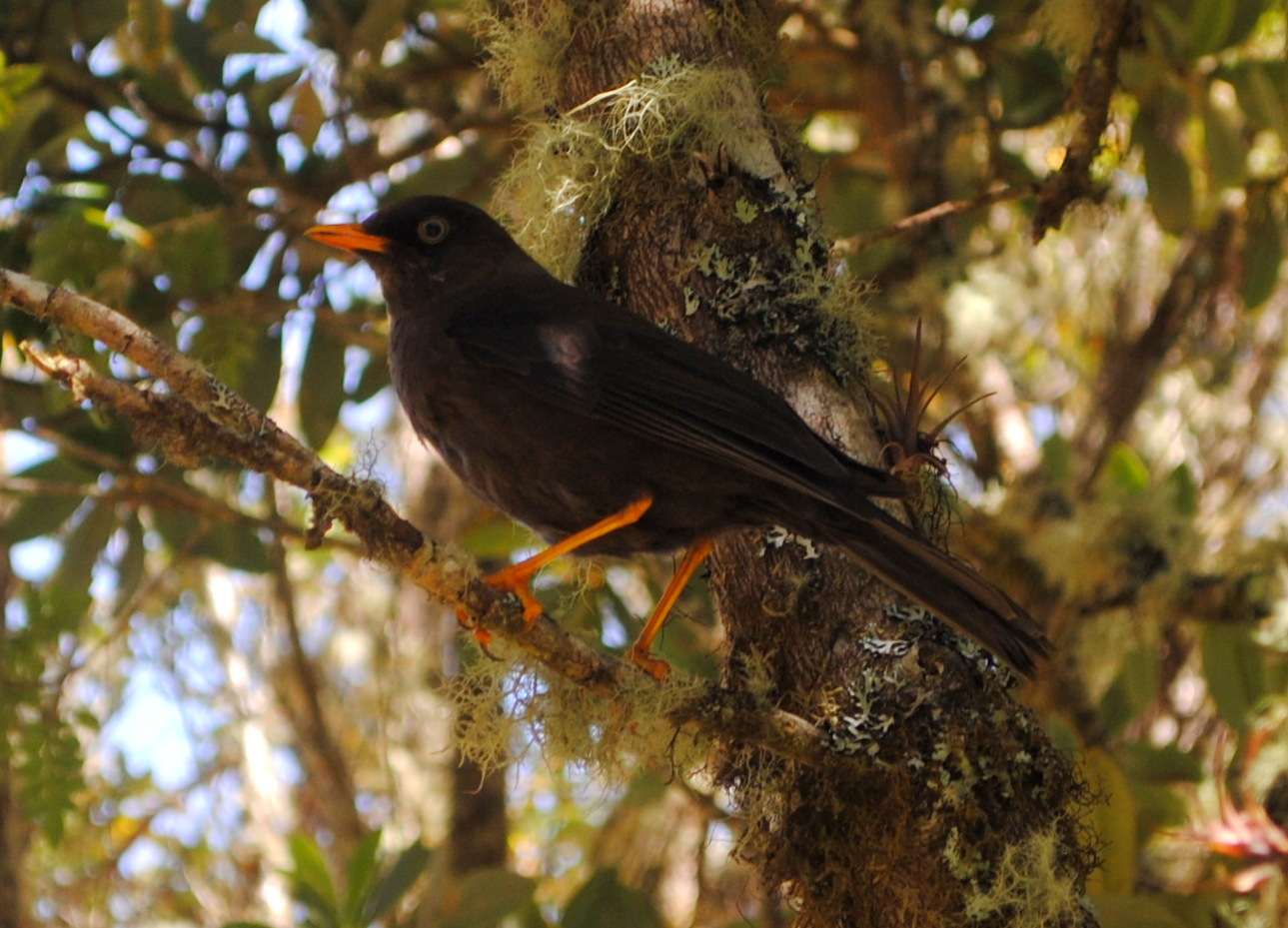
At Tres de Junio, Costa Rica

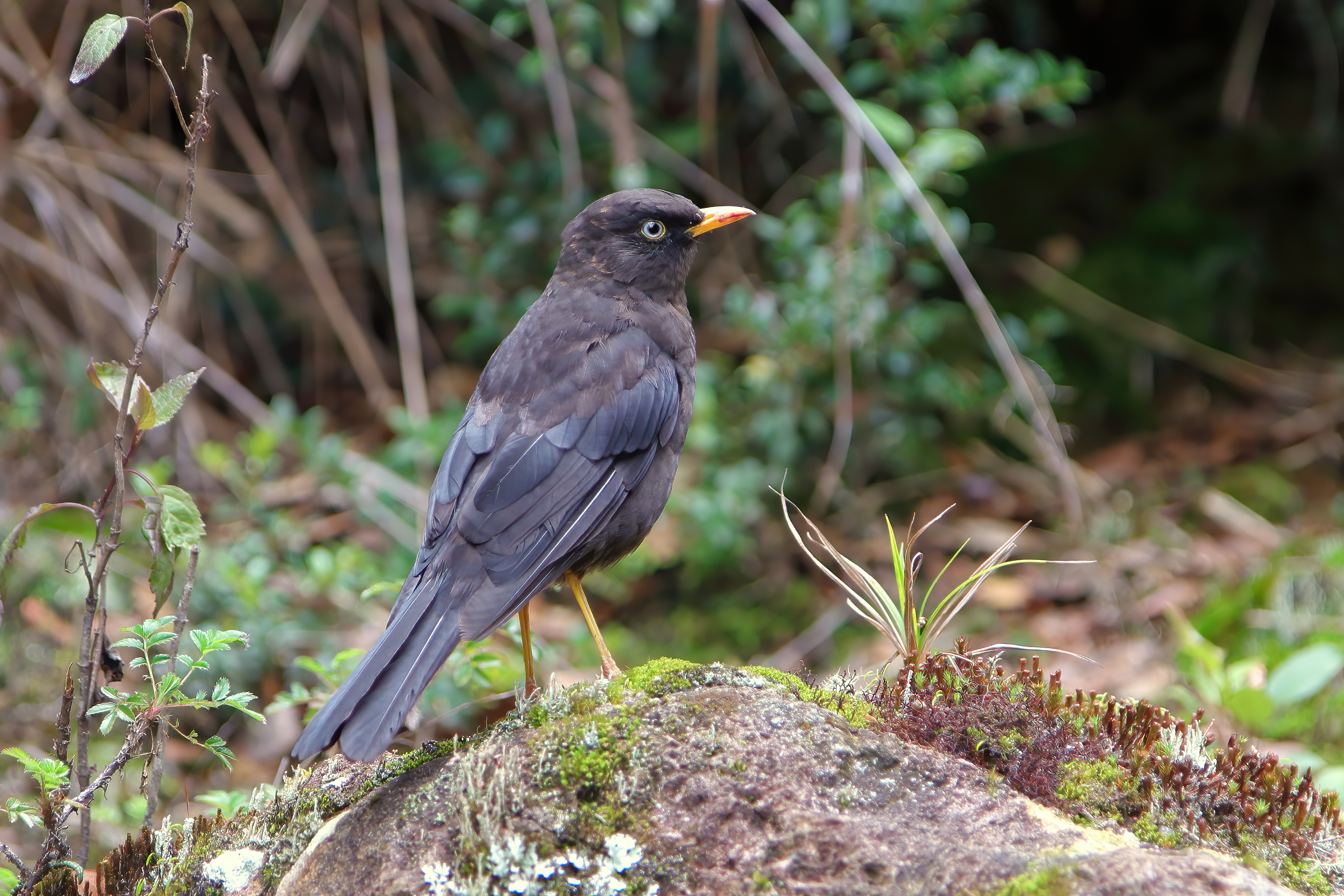
In Chirripó National Park, Costa Rica
