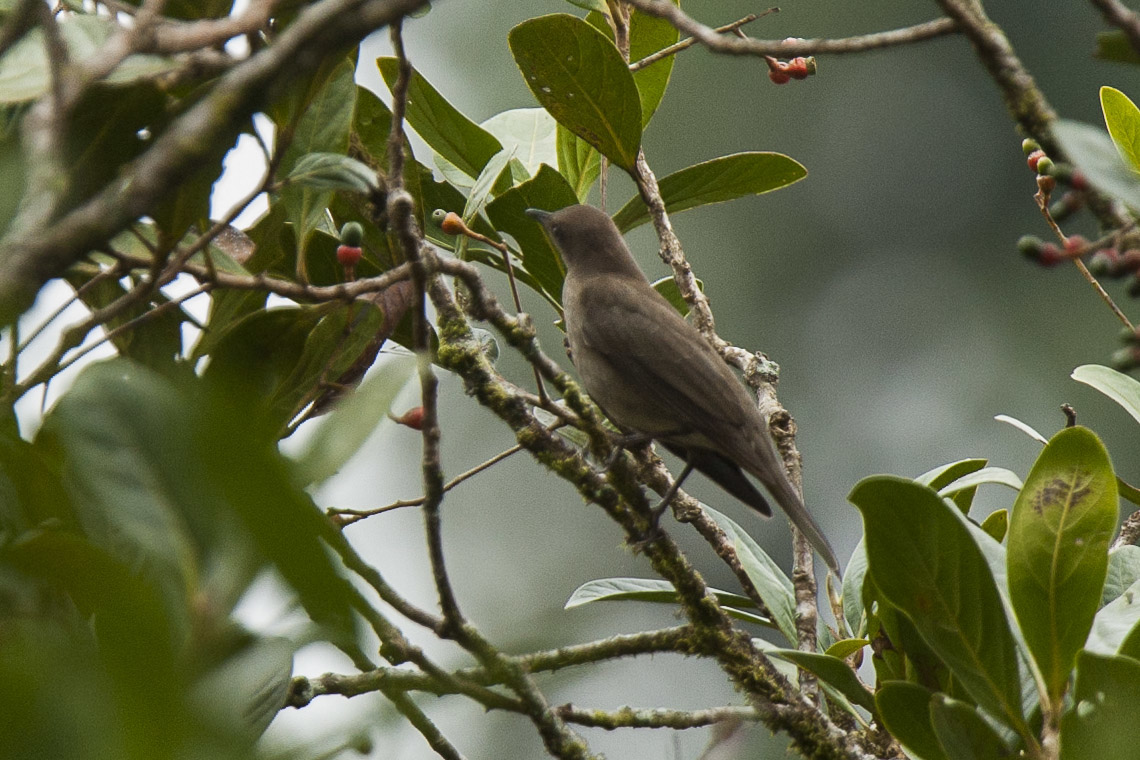

Conservation status
- Least Concern (IUCN 3.1)

Scientific classification
- Kingdom: Animalia
- Phylum: Chordata
- Class: Aves
- Order: Passeriformes
- Family: Turdidae
- Genus: Turdus
- Species: T. plebejus

Binomial name
- Turdus plebejus Cabanis, 1861

= Mountain thrush =

Species of bird

The mountain thrush (Turdus plebejus) is species of bird in the family Turdidae, the thrushes and allies. It is found from Mexico to Panama. It was formerly known as the mountain robin and has also been called the American mountain thrush.

== Taxonomy and systematics ==
The mountain thrush was originally described in 1861 with its current binomial Turdus plebejus.

The species' further taxonomy is unsettled. The IOC, AviList, and BirdLife International's Handbook of the Birds of the World assign it these three subspecies:

- T. p. plebejus: Cabanis, 1861
- T. p. differens: (Nelson, 1901)
- T. p. rafaelensis: Miller, W & Griscom, 1925

However, as of late 2025 the Clements taxonomy recognizes only two by including T. p. rafaelensis within T. p. differens.

This article follows the three-subspecies model.

== Description ==
The mountain thrush is 23 to 25.5 cm (9.1 to 10 in) long; males weigh an average of about 81 g (2.9 oz) and females average about 92 g (3.2 oz). The sexes have the same plumage. Adults of the nominate subspecies T. p. plebejus have mostly olivaceous brown upperparts with a browner head and more olivaceous rump and uppertail coverts. Their throat is pale brown with faint sepia brown streaks. Their underparts are light brown that is lightest in the center of the belly. They have a dark brown iris, a blackish brown bill, and brown to dark brown legs and feet. Juveniles have cinnamon flecks on their olivaceous brown upperparts and cinnamon brown throat and underparts with darker mottling. Subspecies T. p. differens is larger than the nominate; it is much browner overall; its underparts tend to raw umber and its throat is unstreaked and the same color as the underparts. T. p. rafaelensis is smaller than the other two subspecies. Its plumage is intermediate between them, with medium brown upperparts, a slightly streaked throat, and underparts with no umber. T. p. differens and T. p. rafaelensis have brownish bills.

A superficially similar relative of the mountain thrush shares parts of this species' range: The sooty thrush (T. nigrescens) is blacker with an orange bill, eye ring and legs.

== Distribution and habitat ==
The mountain thrush has a disjunct distribution. Subspecies T. p. differens is the northernmost. It is found from the southern Mexican states of Oaxaca and Chiapas well into the southern half of Guatemala. T. p. rafaelensis is found from extreme eastern Guatemala across much of Honduras into north-central Nicaragua and also in isolated locations in El Salvador. The nominate subspecies is found in Costa Rica's Cordillera de Guanacaste, Cordillera Central, and Cordillera de Talamanca. The last extends into far western Panama's Chiriquí and Bocas del Toro provinces.

The mountain thrush inhabits the interior and edges of montane evergreen and pine-oak forests both primary and secondary in the subtropical and lower temperate zones. It favors forest heavy with mosses and epiphytes and also occurs in moss-laden trees in pastures and in gardens, and in the non-breeding season in open groves of fruit-bearing trees. Overall it ranges in elevation between 900 and 3,500 m (3,000 and 11,500 ft). In Guatemala and Honduras it is found between 1,300 and 3,200 m (4,300 and 10,500 ft) and in Costa Rica mostly above 1,200 m (3,900 ft).

== Behavior ==
=== Movement ===
The mountain thrush is generally a year-round resident though in Costa Rica and probably elsewhere there is some movement to lower elevations during the wettest part of the year.

=== Feeding ===
The mountain thrush's diet has not been studied but is known to include insects, other invertebrates, seeds, and berries. In the breeding season it forages singly or in pairs and at other times can gather in small flocks. It forages at all levels of the forest from the ground to the canopy but is usually found from the mid-level up.

=== Breeding ===
The mountain thrush breeds between March and June in Costa Rica and appears to breed within that window elsewhere. It makes a bulky cup nest from moss lined with dry bamboo leaves, rootlets, and other plant material. It is typically placed in dense epiphytes on a tree between about 3 and 12 m (10 and 40 ft) above the ground. The clutch is two or three plain blue-green eggs. The incubation period, time to fledging, and details of parental care are not known.

=== Vocalization ===
The mountain thrush's song has been described as "a warbling series of repeated elements...churee-churee-tea'rrr-clearer-clearer-cheer'up-cheer'up-here!" and its call as "a high-pitched, sharp pseeeeep!".

== Status ==
The IUCN has assessed the mountain thrush as being of Least Concern. It has a large range; its population size is not known and is believed to be decreasing. No immediate threats have been identified. It is considered uncommon in northern Central America and fairly common in Costa Rica. "Under Mexican law, however, Mountain Thrush is regarded as subject to special protection, as this species could be threatened by habitat loss."
