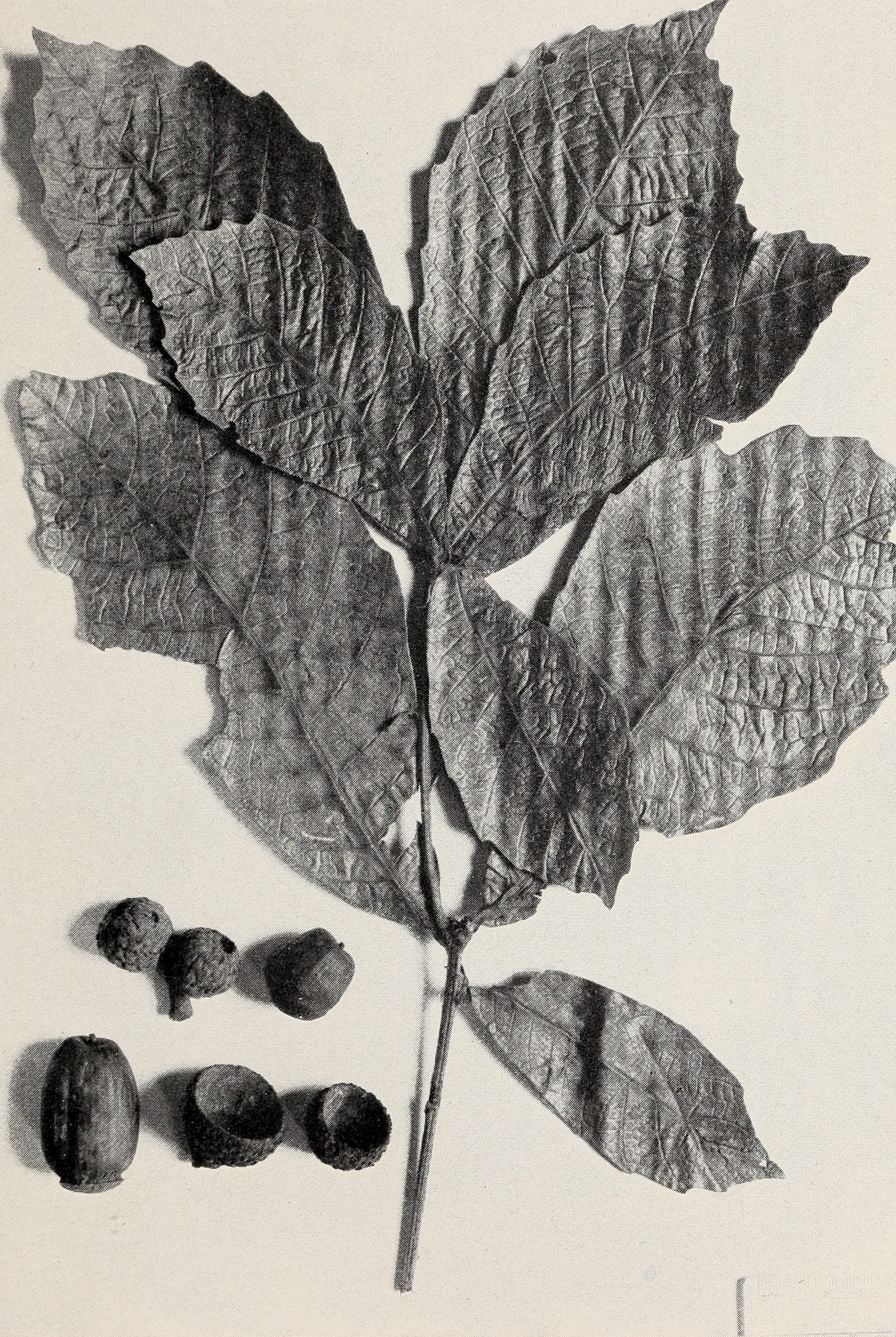

Conservation status
- Critically Endangered (IUCN 3.1)

Scientific classification
- Kingdom: Plantae
- Clade: Embryophytes
- Clade: Tracheophytes
- Clade: Spermatophytes
- Clade: Angiosperms
- Clade: Eudicots
- Clade: Rosids
- Order: Fagales
- Family: Fagaceae
- Genus: Quercus
- Subgenus: Quercus subg. Quercus
- Section: Quercus sect. Quercus
- Species: Q. oocarpa

Binomial name
- Quercus oocarpa Liebm.

Synonyms
- List: Quercus oöcarpa Liebm.; Quercus glabrescens Seemen; Quercus insignis subsp. oocarpa (Liebm.) A.E.Murray; Quercus insignis var. oocarpa (Liebm.) A.E.Murray; Quercus warszewiczii Liebm.; Quercus yunckeri Trel.

= Quercus oocarpa =

Species of oak tree

Quercus oocarpa is a Mesoamerican species of oak.

It is native to Central America and southern Mexico, with an isolated population in the canyons of Jalisco in western Mexico.

== Description ==
Quercus oocarpa is a large forest tree frequently more than 25 metres (82 feet) tall, evergreen or deciduous, with a trunk as much as 100 centimetres (39 inches) in diameter. The leaves are sometimes as much as 45 cm (18 in) long, broadly egg-shaped with numerous small pointed teeth along the edges.

== Range and habitat ==
Quercus oocarpa ranges from southwestern Mexico (Nayarit, Jalisco, and Guerrero states, and possibly Chiapas), through Guatemala, Honduras, Nicaragua, and Costa Rica to Panama. Some specimens of Quercus insignis M.Martens & Galeotti from Chiapas have been confused with this species.

It inhabits humid montane forests, including cloud forests and pine–oak–Liquidambar forests, between 1400 and 2000 meters elevation.
