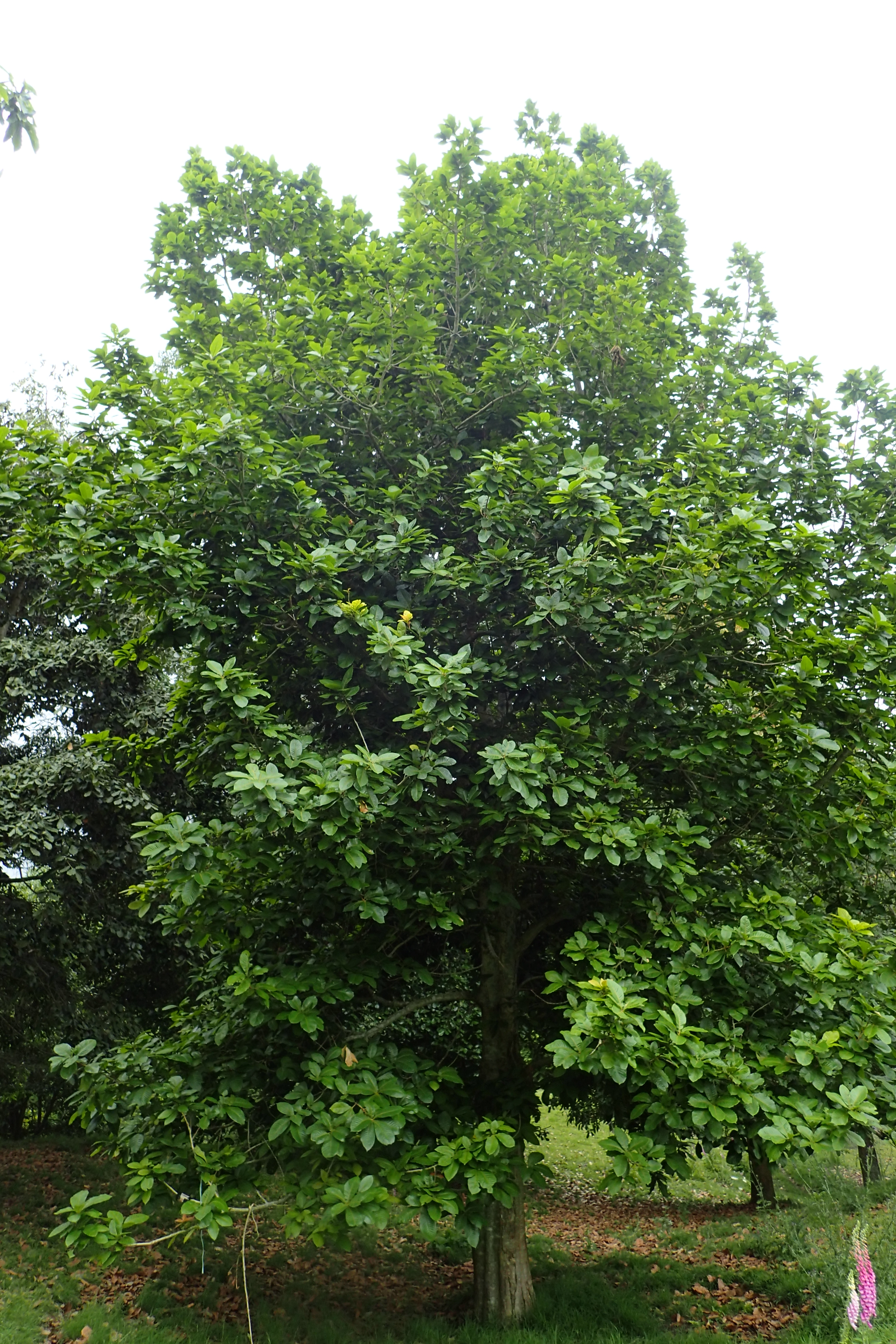

Conservation status
- Endangered (IUCN 3.1)

Scientific classification
- Kingdom: Plantae
- Clade: Embryophytes
- Clade: Tracheophytes
- Clade: Spermatophytes
- Clade: Angiosperms
- Clade: Eudicots
- Clade: Rosids
- Order: Fagales
- Family: Fagaceae
- Genus: Quercus
- Subgenus: Quercus subg. Quercus
- Section: Quercus sect. Quercus
- Species: Q. insignis

Binomial name
- Quercus insignis M.Martens & Galeotti

Synonyms
- List: Quercus davidsoniae Standl.; Quercus insignis var. strombocarpoides Liebm.; Quercus schippii Standl.; Quercus seibertii C.H.Mull.; Quercus strombocarpa Liebm.; Quercus tomentocaulis C.H.Mull.

= Quercus insignis =

Species of oak tree

Quercus insignis (locally encino chicalaba) is a Mesoamerican species of oak in the white oak section, (Quercus section Quercus) within the family Fagaceae. It is native to southern Mexico and Central America, from Veracruz to Panama.

== Description ==
Quercus insignis is generally a large tree, growing up to 30 meters in height. The tree has leaves up to 15 centimetres (6 inches) and 8 cm (3 in) across. The acorns are large and distinctive, up to 8 cm in diameter, the cup covered with extended scales that give the cup a bur-like appearance. It produces acorns every five to ten years. Acorns mature in June to July in the southern parts of its Central American range, and in October in the northernmost populations in southern Mexico.

It is generally a slow-growing tree, with a long life-cycle, and regenerates slowly after disturbances.

== Range and habitat ==
Quercus insignis is found in humid mountain cloud forests, between 1500 and 2500 meters elevation. Despite a wide range, its populations are scattered and low-density.

In Mexico, its range includes the Sierra de San Juan in Nayarit, the Sierra el Cuale and Sierra de Manantlán in western Jalisco, scattered populations in the Sierra Madre del Sur of Guerrero and Oaxaca, the easternmost Trans-Mexican Volcanic Belt above Xalapa in Veracruz, and the Sierra Madre de Chiapas and Chiapas Highlands in Chiapas.

In Central America, its range includes the Maya Mountains of Belize, and scattered locations in the mountains of Honduras, Nicaragua, Costa Rica, and western Panama.

== Conservation and threats ==
The species is rare in Mexico, Panama, and Guatemala, although reportedly still locally abundant in Nicaragua.

The species conservation status is Endangered. It suffers from habitat loss and habitat fragmentation from deforestation, often for timber extraction or conversion to coffee plantations.
