= Irazú Volcano National Park =

National park in Costa Rica

- IUCN category II (national park)
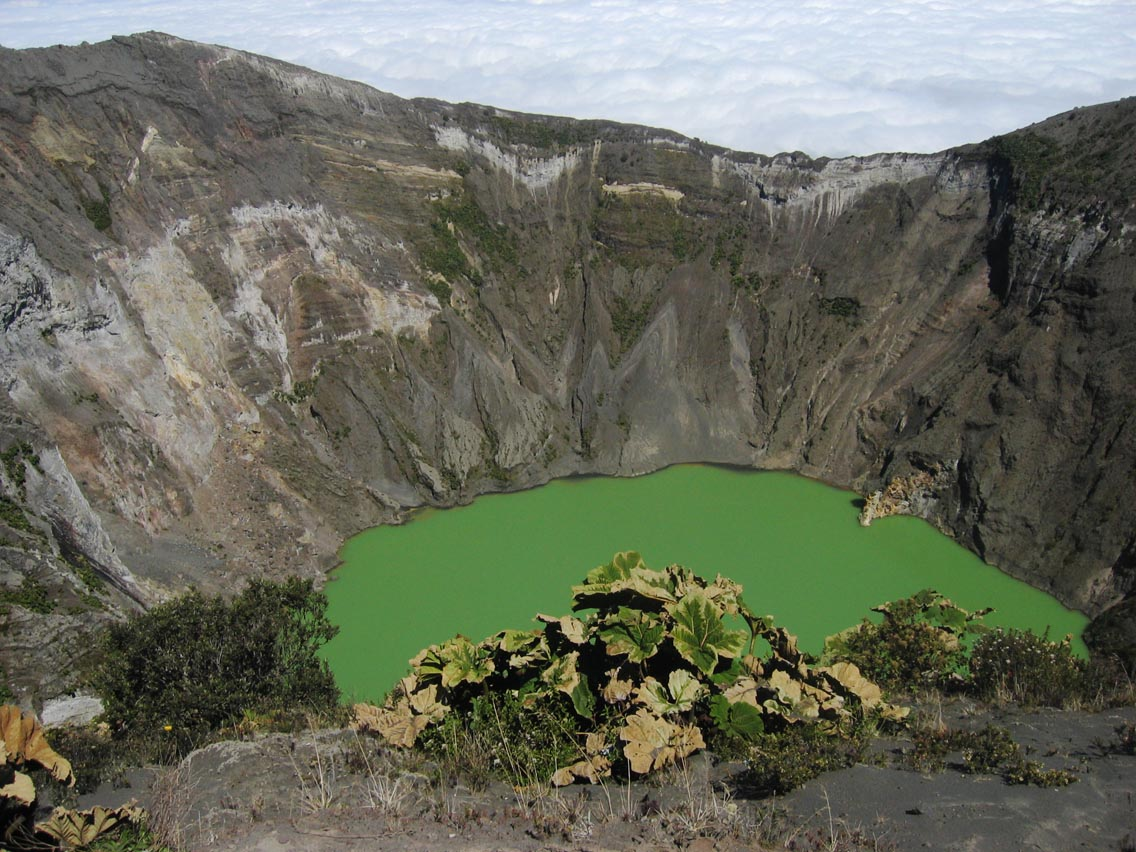
- Irazú volcano crater
- Irazú Volcano National Park
- Location: Costa Rica
- Nearest city: Cartago
- Coordinates: 9°58′44″N 83°51′7″W
- Area: 20 km^{2} (7.7 sq mi)
- Established: 9 August 1955
- Governing body: National System of Conservation Areas (SINAC)
- Location in Costa Rica

Irazú Volcano National Park, or in Spanish the Parque Nacional Volcán Irazú, is a national park in the Central Conservation Area in Cartago Province, Costa Rica, that encompasses Irazú Volcano as well as the Prusia Forest Reserve, formerly the Ruben Torres Rojas Forest Reserve. It was established on 9 August 1955. It is a popular tourist destination, as it is only about a 24-kilometre (15 mi) drive on paved roads from the city of Cartago and a further 14 kilometres (8.7 mi) from the capital of Costa Rica, San José, though the volcano is still active and experienced major eruptions from 1963 to 1965 and as recently as 1977.

== Geography ==
The park extends over about 2,000 hectares (4,900 acres), following a boundary expansion under Executive Decree No. 26945-MINAE of 22 August 1988.

Irazú Volcano is one of three named mountains in the park and is the tallest active volcano in Costa Rica. The crater lake in its Diego de la Haya crater can change color between "emerald green and crimson red" depending on the minerals washed into it from the crater walls by rain.

== Climate ==
The temperature averages 40 °F (4 °C), and the average rainfall is 80 inches (2,000 mm).

== Flora and fauna ==
Montane forests—primary, secondary and cloud forest—grow in the park. The forest is made up of conifers and other exotic and native species and also a native forest consisting mainly of oaks and alders, protecting the watershed of the Reventado River. There are also cypress, mountain pines, as well as bromeliads, ferns, and orchids. Prusia Forest Reserve is the site of a reforestation project to restore what was destroyed by Irazú Volcano's eruptions from 1963 to 1965.

Owls, armadillos, rabbits, hummingbirds, and woodpeckers reside in the park.
