= Cordillera Central (Costa Rica) =

Mountain range in Costa Rica

- Cordillera Volcánica Central
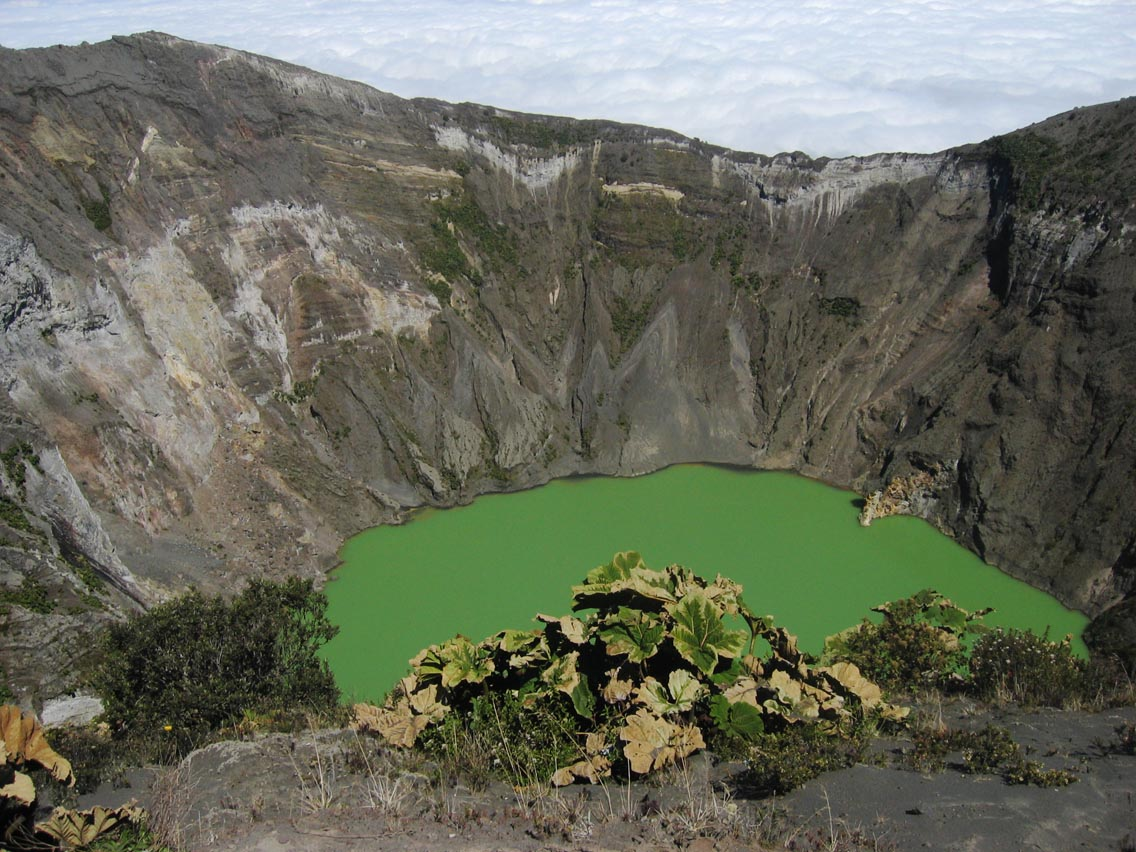
- Crater of Irazú Volcano

Highest point
- Peak: Irazú Volcano
- Elevation: 3,432 m (11,260 ft)
- Coordinates: 9°58′37″N 83°51′15″W

Geography
- Map of Cordillera Central
- Country: Costa Rica
- Parent range: Central America Volcanic Arc
- Biome: Lowland tropical wet forest

Geology
- Rock age: Quaternary

The Cordillera Central is a volcanic mountain range in central Costa Rica which continues from the Continental Divide to east of Cordillera de Tilarán. It extends 80 km from Tapezco Pass to the Turrialba Volcano and ends on the Pacuare River. It is separated from Cordillera de Tilarán by Balsa River and Platanar and Zarcero hills. The Cordillera Central is part of the American Cordillera, an almost continuous sequence of mountain ranges (cordilleras) that form the western "backbone" of North, Central, and South America, and Antarctica.

It contains four large volcanoes Poás (2,708 m), Barva (2,906 m), Irazú, and Turrialba (3,340 m). The highest peak is Irazú at 3,432 m.

Elevated plains of central tectonic depression of Costa Rican Central Valley lie south of the range.

Cordillera Central's four main volcanoes are protected as national parks. The volcanic massif of the Poás Volcano is the central feature of Poás Volcano National Park, featuring permanent fumarolic activity. Barva Volcano has prominent hydrothermal activity (hot springs), and is a part of Braulio Carrillo National Park.

Irazú Volcano National Park contains Irazú Volcano, the highest volcano of Costa Rica. The height of the volcano makes it a strategic site for telecommunications; many national television and radio stations have antennas at the summit.

Turrialba Volcano National Park, centered on Turrialba Volcano, has fumarolic activity and gas emissions.
