= Irazú Volcano =

Active volcano in Costa Rica

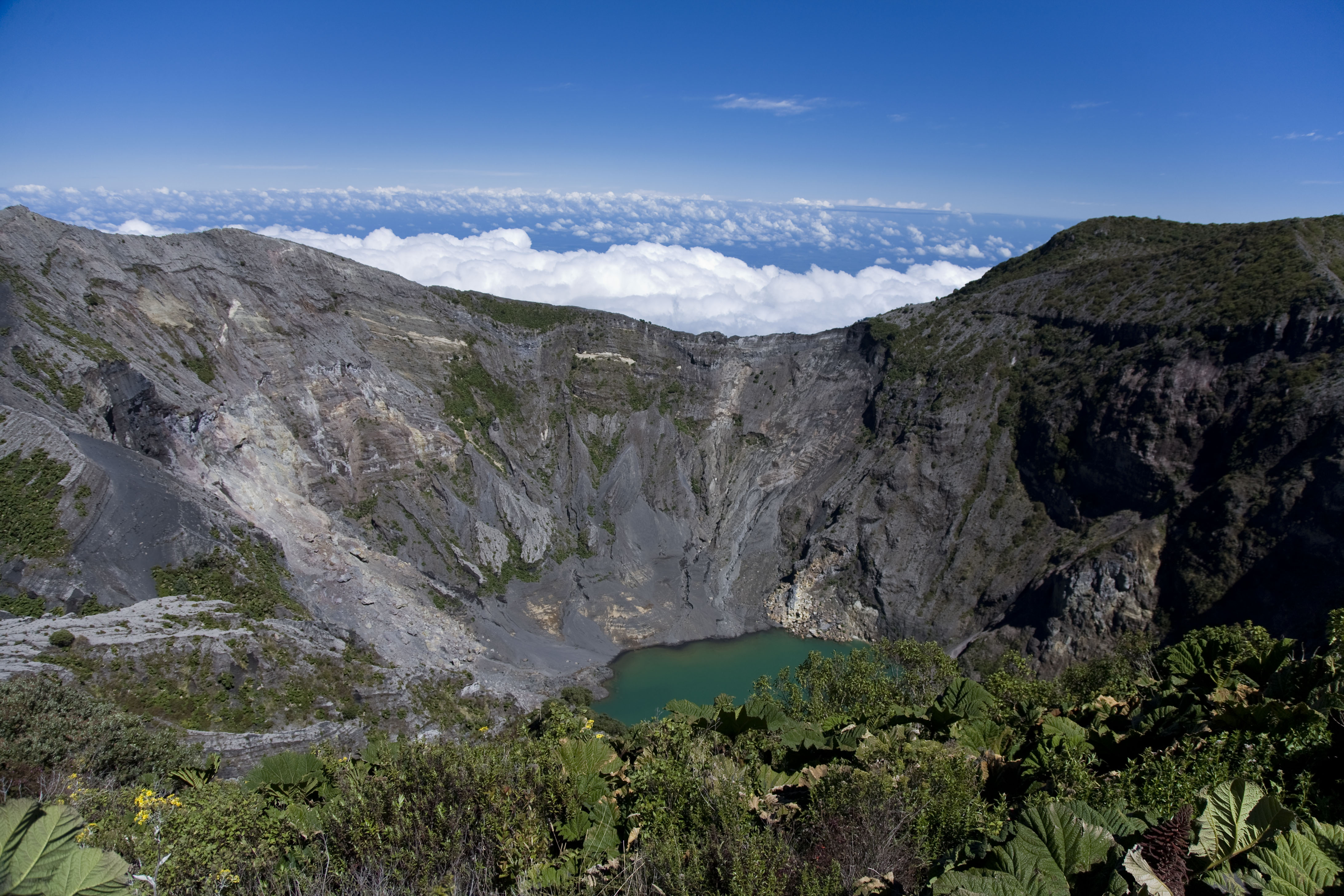
- Irazú Crater

Highest point
- Elevation: 3,432 m (11,260 ft)
- Coordinates: 9°58′45″N 83°51′09″W

Geography
- Location within Costa Rica
- Location: Costa Rica
- Parent range: Cordillera Central

Geology
- Mountain type: Complex Stratovolcano
- Volcanic arc: Central America Volcanic Arc
- Last eruption: December 1994

The Irazú Volcano (Spanish: Volcán Irazú) is an active volcano in Costa Rica, situated in the Cordillera Central near the city of Cartago.

The name might have come from either the combination of "ara" (point) and "tzu" (thunder) or a corruption of Iztarú, which was the name of an indigenous village on the flanks of the volcano. In Costa Rica it is known by the name of "El Coloso" (the Colossus) due to the catastrophes that it has unleashed in the past.

The volcano's summit has several craters, one of which contains Diego de la Haya, a green crater lake of variable depth. At 11,260 feet (3,432 m), the Irazú Volcano is the highest active volcano in Costa Rica. It is thus a popular tourist spot. It is easily visited from San José, the Costa Rican capital, with a road leading right up to the summit craters and a weekly bus service to the top. The summit of the volcano also houses a few television transmitters for television stations in San José.

It is possible to see both the Atlantic and Pacific oceans from the top on a clear day. However, such clear days are rare, and the volcano's summit is usually cloud-covered.

The volcano is contained within the Irazú Volcano National Park, which spreads across 5,705 acres (2,300 ha). The national park contains both primary and secondary montane forests and is home to armadillos, owls, rabbits, foxes, woodpeckers, and hummingbirds.

== Geology ==
The Irazú volcano is a complex volcanic shield. It is the highest active volcano in Costa Rica, and has an area of 500 km^{2} (190 sq mi). It has an irregular subconic shape, and temperatures at its summit vary between 3 and 17 °C (37 and 63 °F), with a record low of −3 °C(26.6 °F) and a record high of 23.2 °C(73.4 °F). Irazu volcano is a stratovolcano with a summit elevation of 3,432 metres (11,260 ft). Its five craters are easily differentiated. The most important ones, because of their activity, are The Main Crater and the Diego de la Haya crater. The Main Crater is almost circular, has very inclined walls and it measures 1,050 metres (3,440 ft) in diameter and 300 metres (980 ft) deep. The Diego de la Haya crater is 600 metres (2,000 ft) in diameter and 100 metres (330 ft) deep. Other craters are Playa Hermosa, La Laguna, and El Piroclastico.

Irazú is the southernmost of the ten Quaternary volcanoes which form a northwest-trending line through central and northern Costa Rica. Radioactive dating has shown an age of at least 854,000 years with eruption peaks at 570,000 years and the most recent active phase from 136,000 years to present. The most recent activity includes lava flows along with strombolian and phreatomagmatic explosions. Lava types include basalt and andesite erupted during different events suggesting the volcano is fed by two distinct magma chambers. Scientists believed that pulses of magma mixed together in the chamber before climbing upward—a process estimated to take several thousands of years. But Columbia University volcanologists found that the eruption of Costa Rica's Irazu volcano in 1963 was likely triggered by magma that took a nonstop route from the mantle over just a few months. Study authors called it the highway from hell.

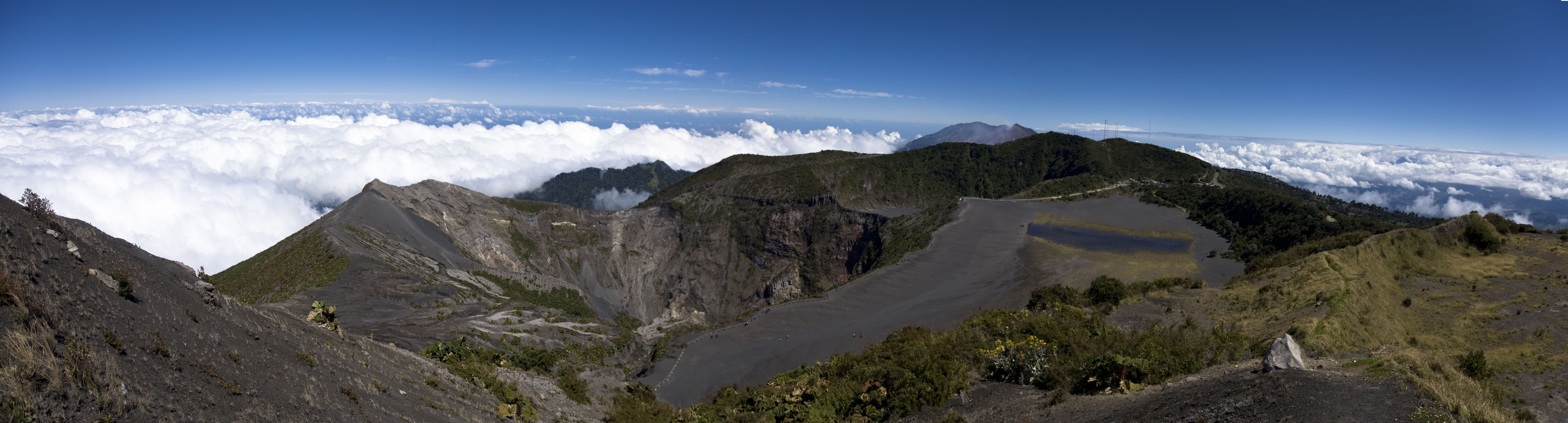
A panoramic view of the Irazú Volcano
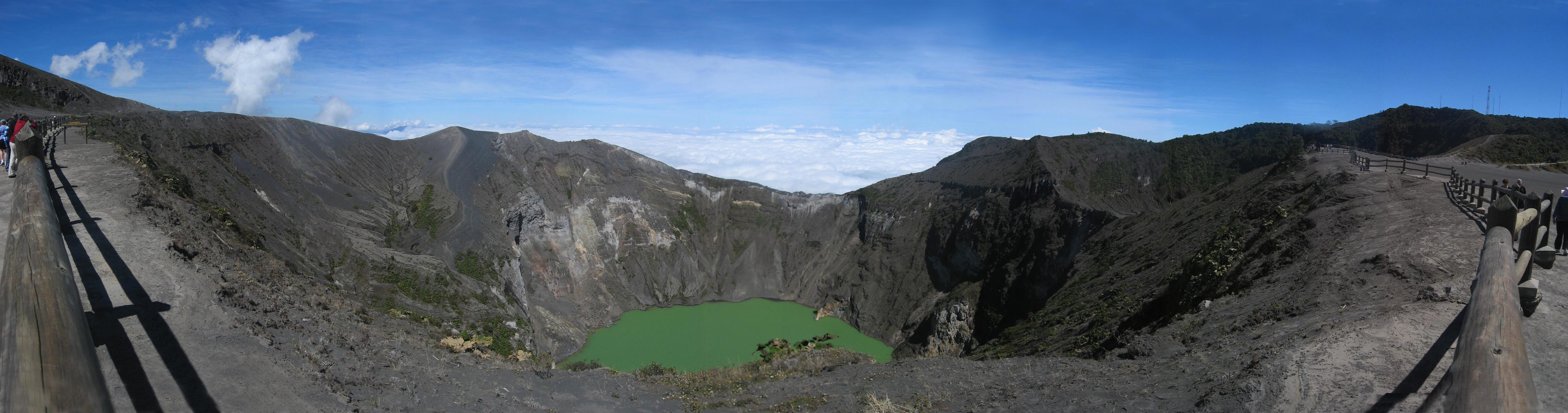
Panorama of Irazú Volcano.
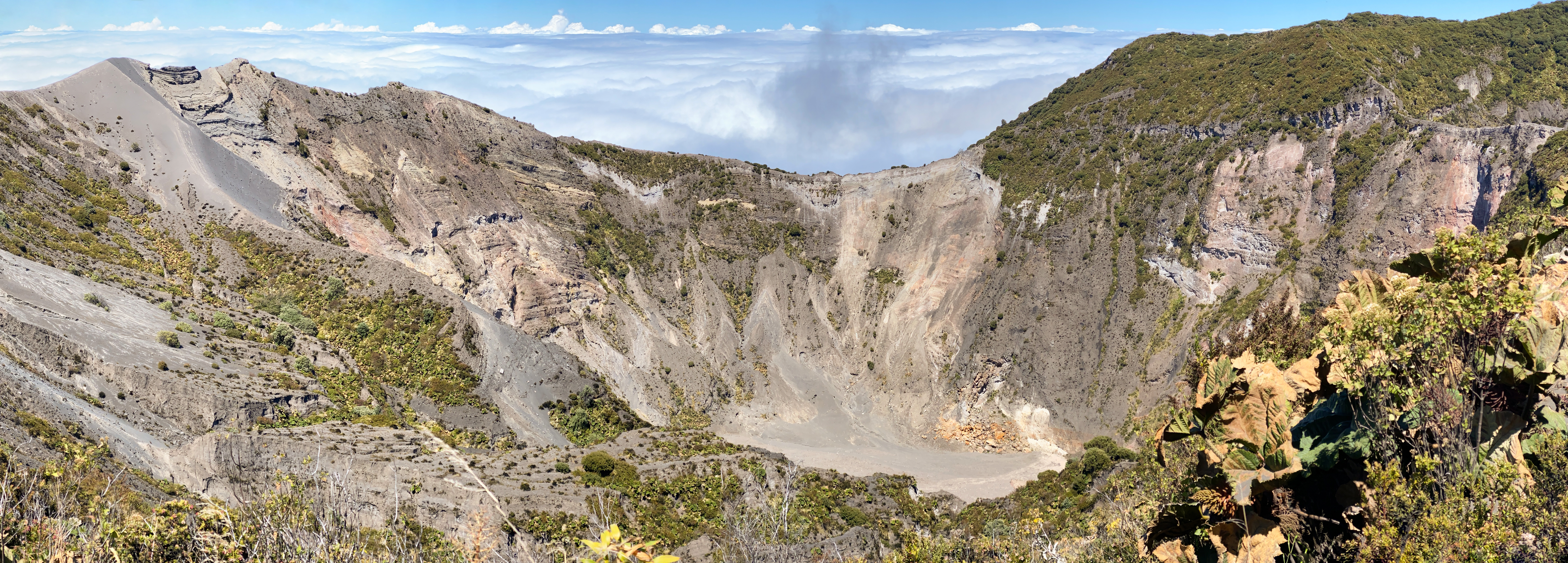
View of the crater with the dry lake.

== Activity ==
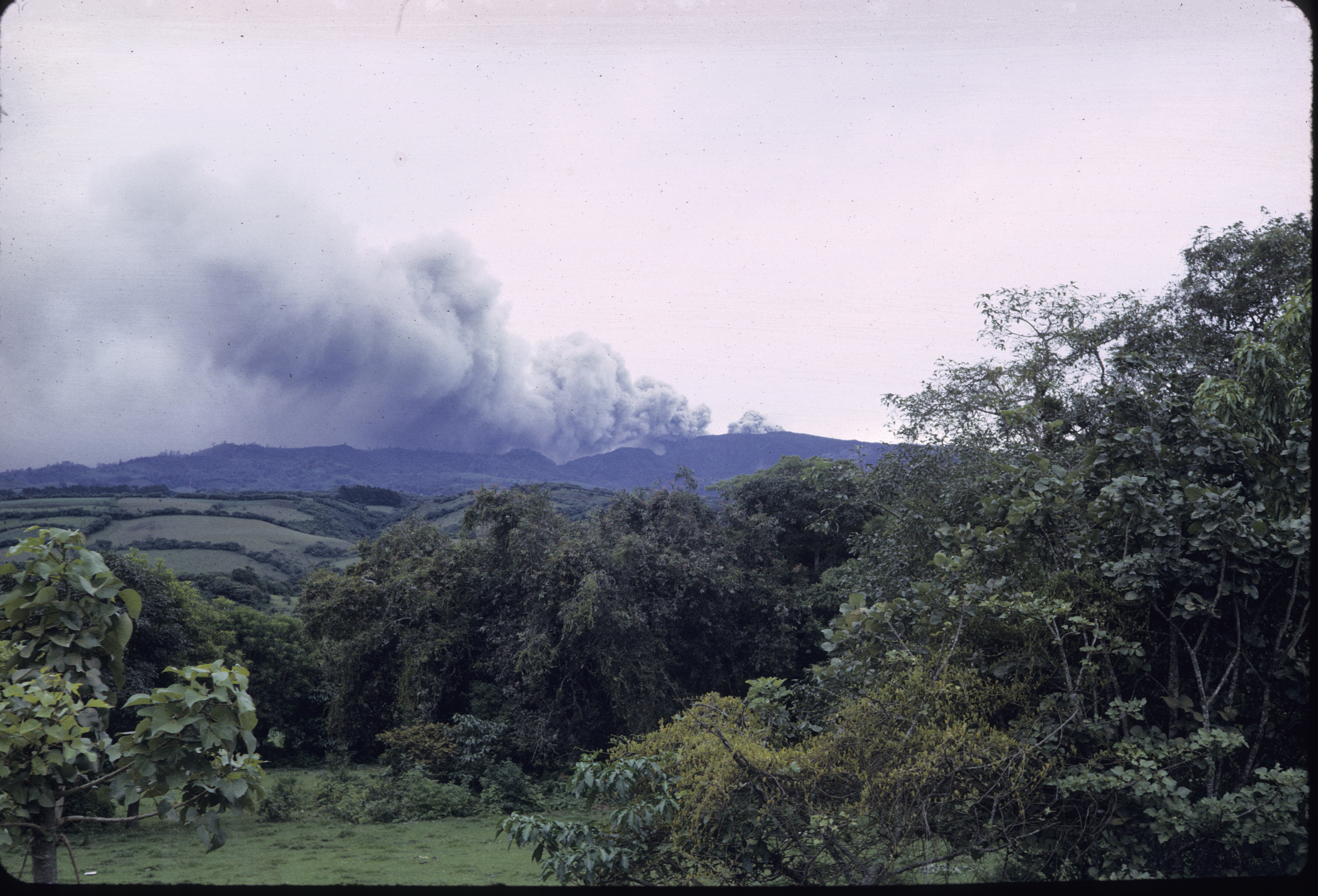
Remote view of the 1963 eruption

Irazú has erupted frequently in historical times — at least 23 times since its first historically recorded eruption in 1723. Its most famous eruption began in mid-March 1963, a few days before US President John F. Kennedy started a state visit to Costa Rica. It showered the capital San José and much of the central highlands of Costa Rica with volcanic ash. Eruptions continued for two years.

Its historical eruptions generally have VEIs of 1 to 3. All historical eruptions have been explosive, and there have been many phreatic eruptions, and some have produced pyroclastic flows. The latest eruption lasted only 1 day, and occurred on December 8, 1994. It occurred at a flank vent and was a phreatic eruption, which produced lahars.

== Climate ==
Climate data for Volcán Irazú, Costa Rica (2005–2018)
Month	Jan	Feb	Mar	Apr	May	Jun	Jul	Aug	Sep	Oct	Nov	Dec	Year
Mean daily maximum °C (°F)	12.6 (54.7)	14.2 (57.6)	15.8 (60.4)	16.4 (61.5)	15.4 (59.7)	14.2 (57.6)	12.3 (54.1)	13.2 (55.8)	14.4 (57.9)	14.3 (57.7)	12.8 (55.0)	12.1 (53.8)	14.0 (57.2)
Daily mean °C (°F)	8.3 (46.9)	9.3 (48.7)	10.4 (50.7)	11.1 (52.0)	10.8 (51.4)	10.2 (50.4)	8.9 (48.0)	9.4 (48.9)	10.1 (50.2)	10.1 (50.2)	9.1 (48.4)	8.3 (46.9)	9.7 (49.4)
Mean daily minimum °C (°F)	4.0 (39.2)	4.3 (39.7)	4.9 (40.8)	5.7 (42.3)	6.2 (43.2)	6.2 (43.2)	5.5 (41.9)	5.6 (42.1)	5.8 (42.4)	5.8 (42.4)	5.4 (41.7)	4.4 (39.9)	5.3 (41.6)
Average rainfall mm (inches)	110.4 (4.35)	57.4 (2.26)	35.2 (1.39)	54.1 (2.13)	181.2 (7.13)	166.4 (6.55)	177.3 (6.98)	139.9 (5.51)	201.7 (7.94)	268.0 (10.55)	300.1 (11.81)	173.0 (6.81)	1,864.7 (73.41)
Average rainy days	17	12	12	15	23	23	24	23	25	28	24	22	248
Average relative humidity (%)	73	64	62	73	83	89	91	89	89	90	89	81	81
Source: Instituto Meteorológico Nacional

== Gallery ==
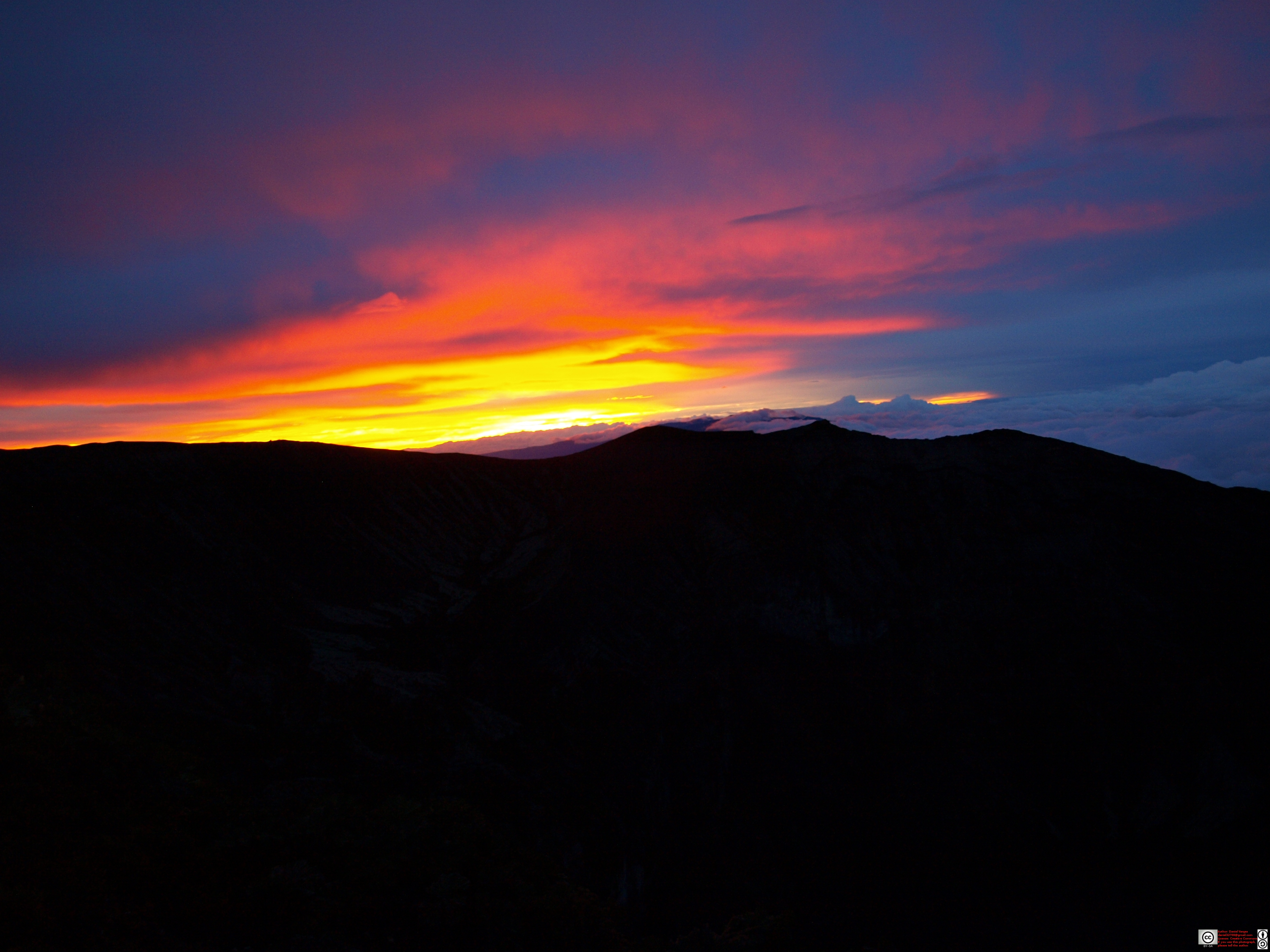
Sunset from the summit

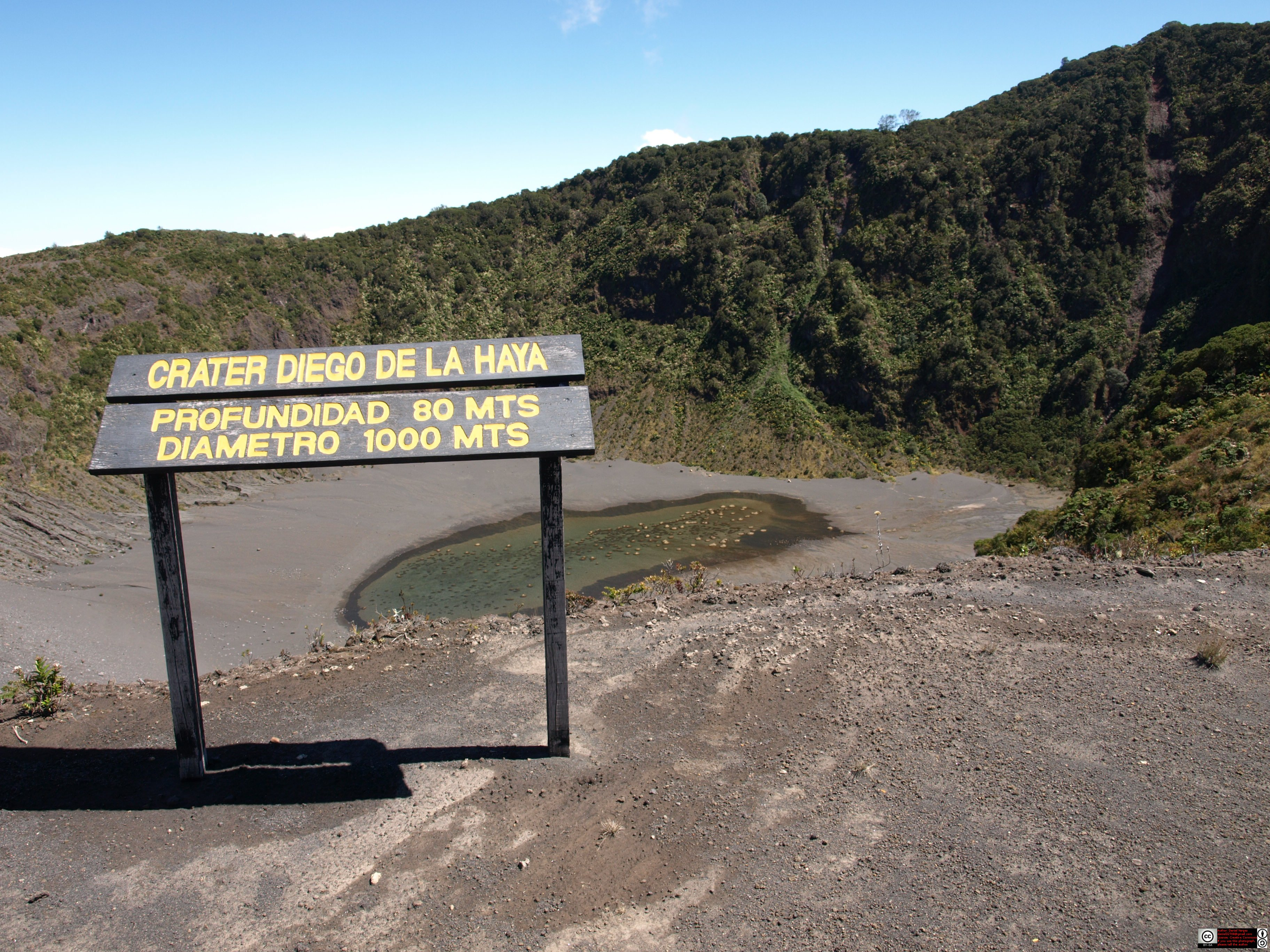
Top view of Diego de la Haya

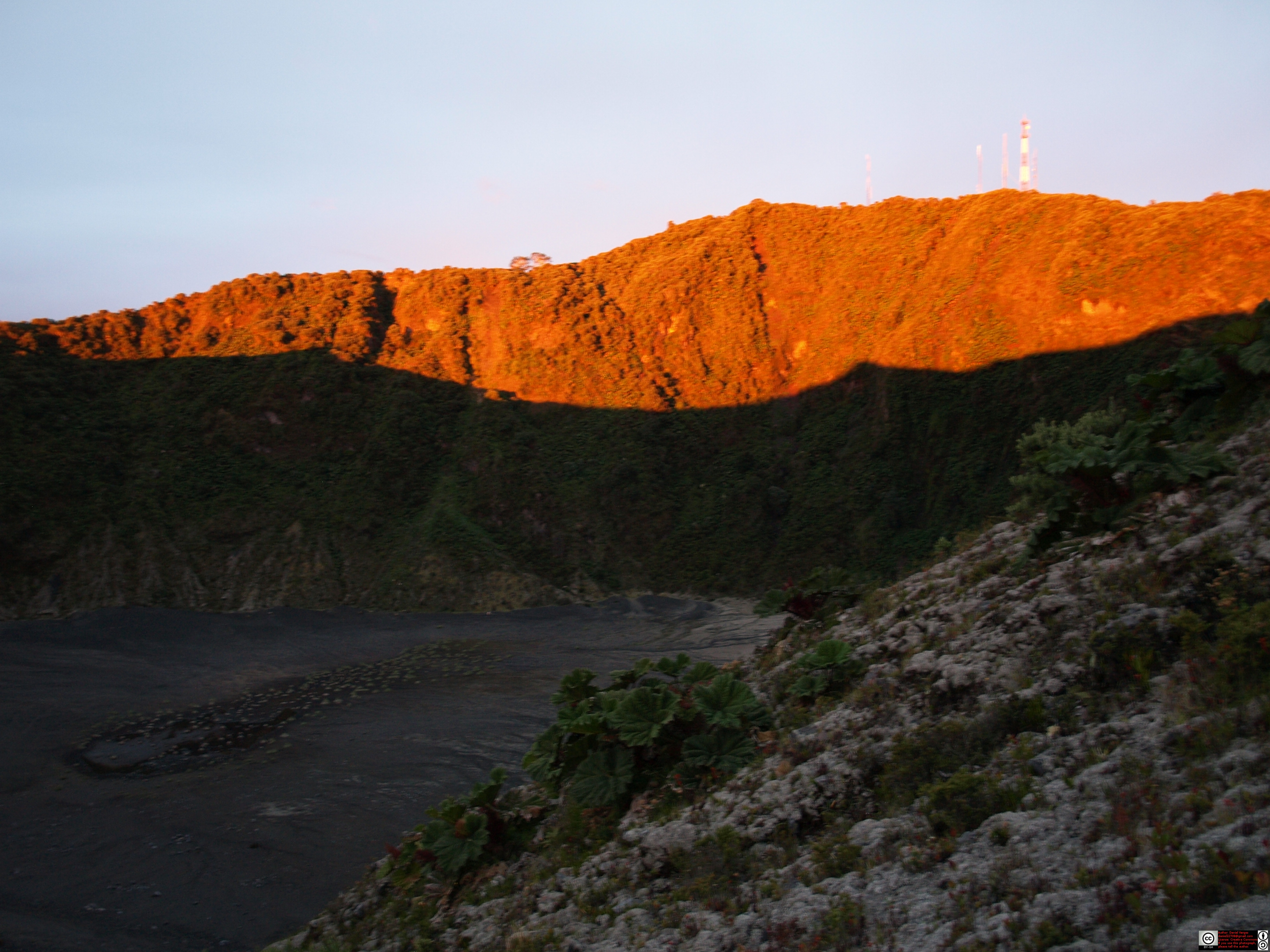
Sunset at Diego de la Haya crater

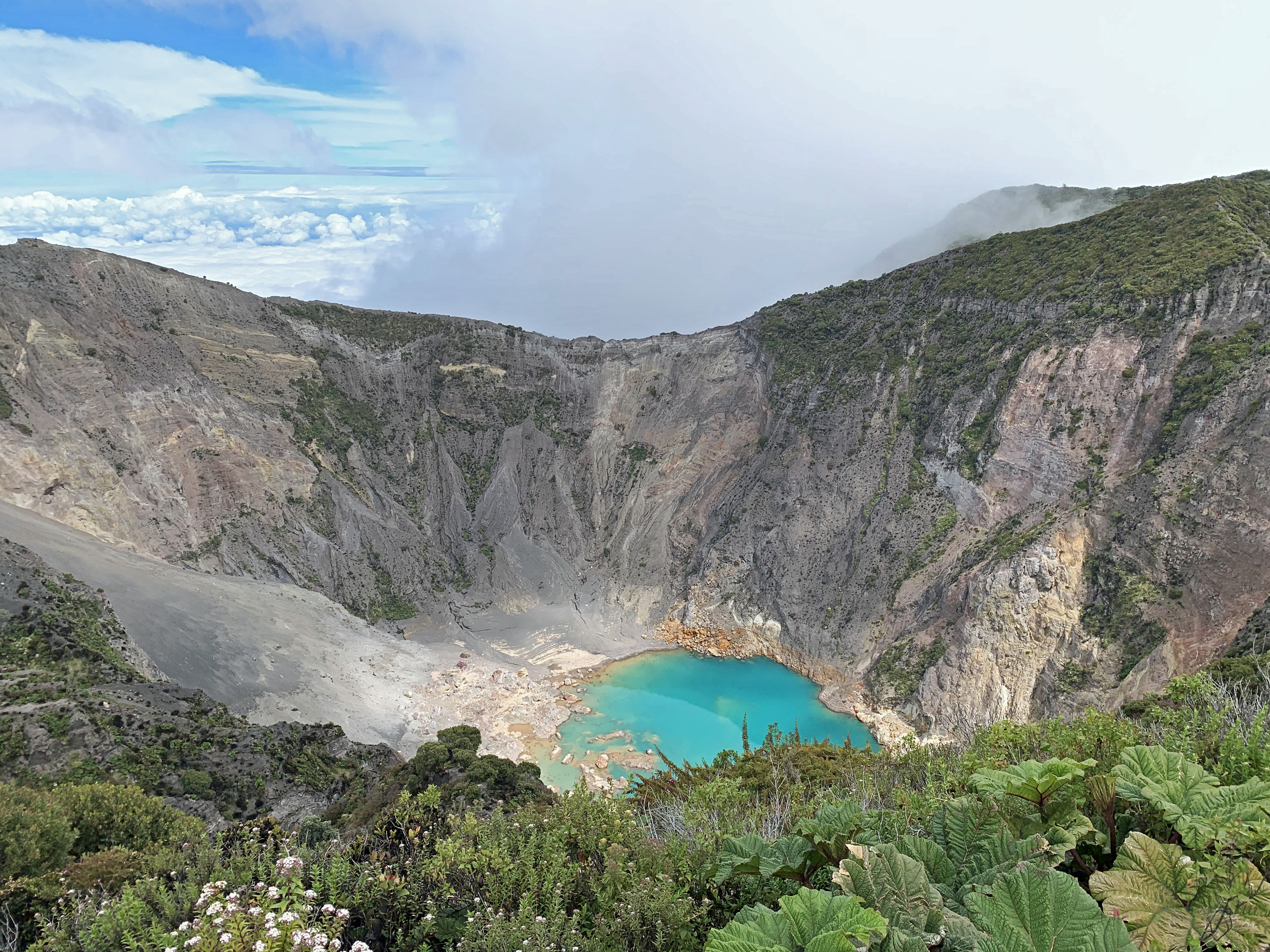
Main crater lagoon

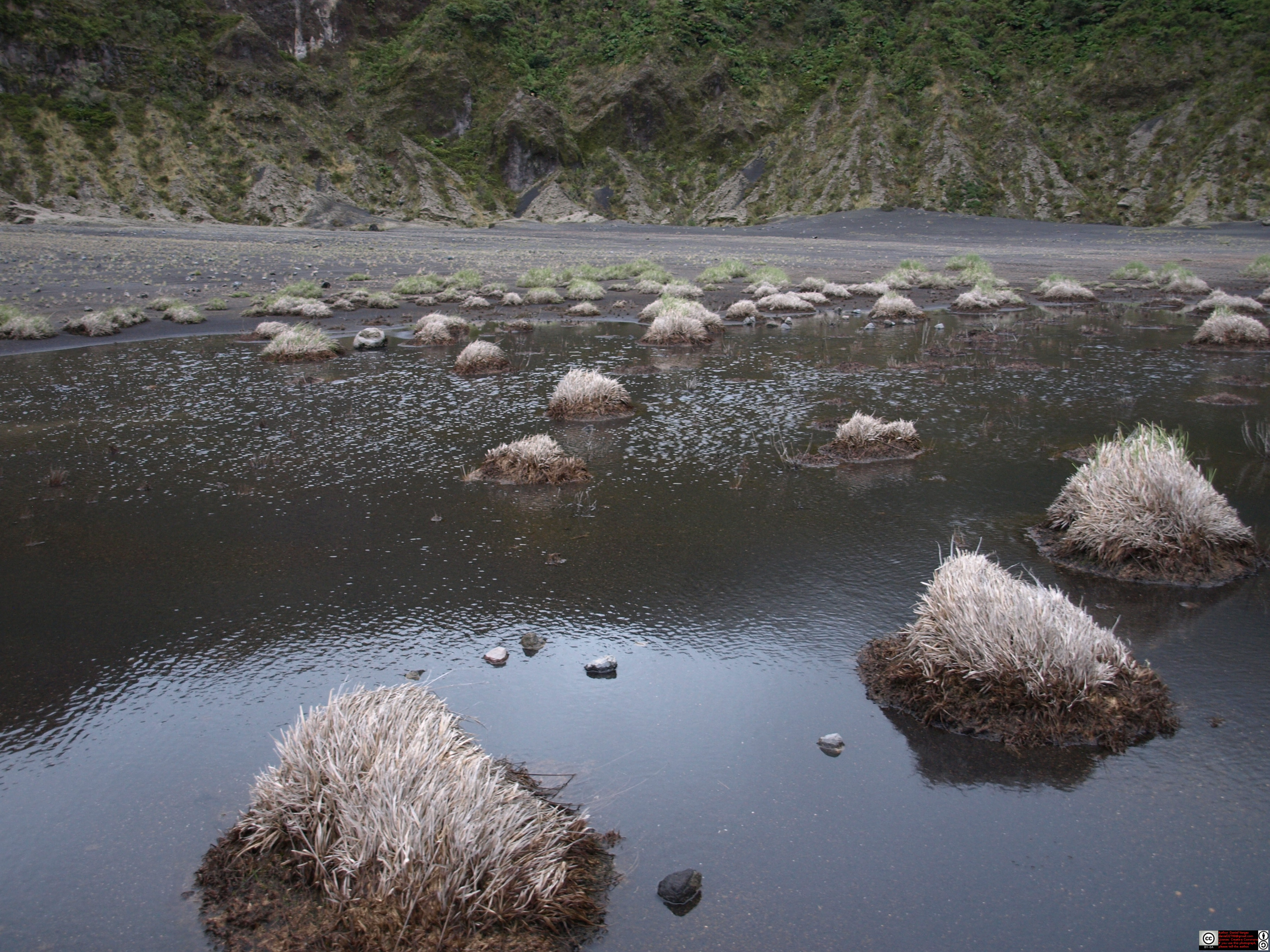
Inside Diego de la Haya

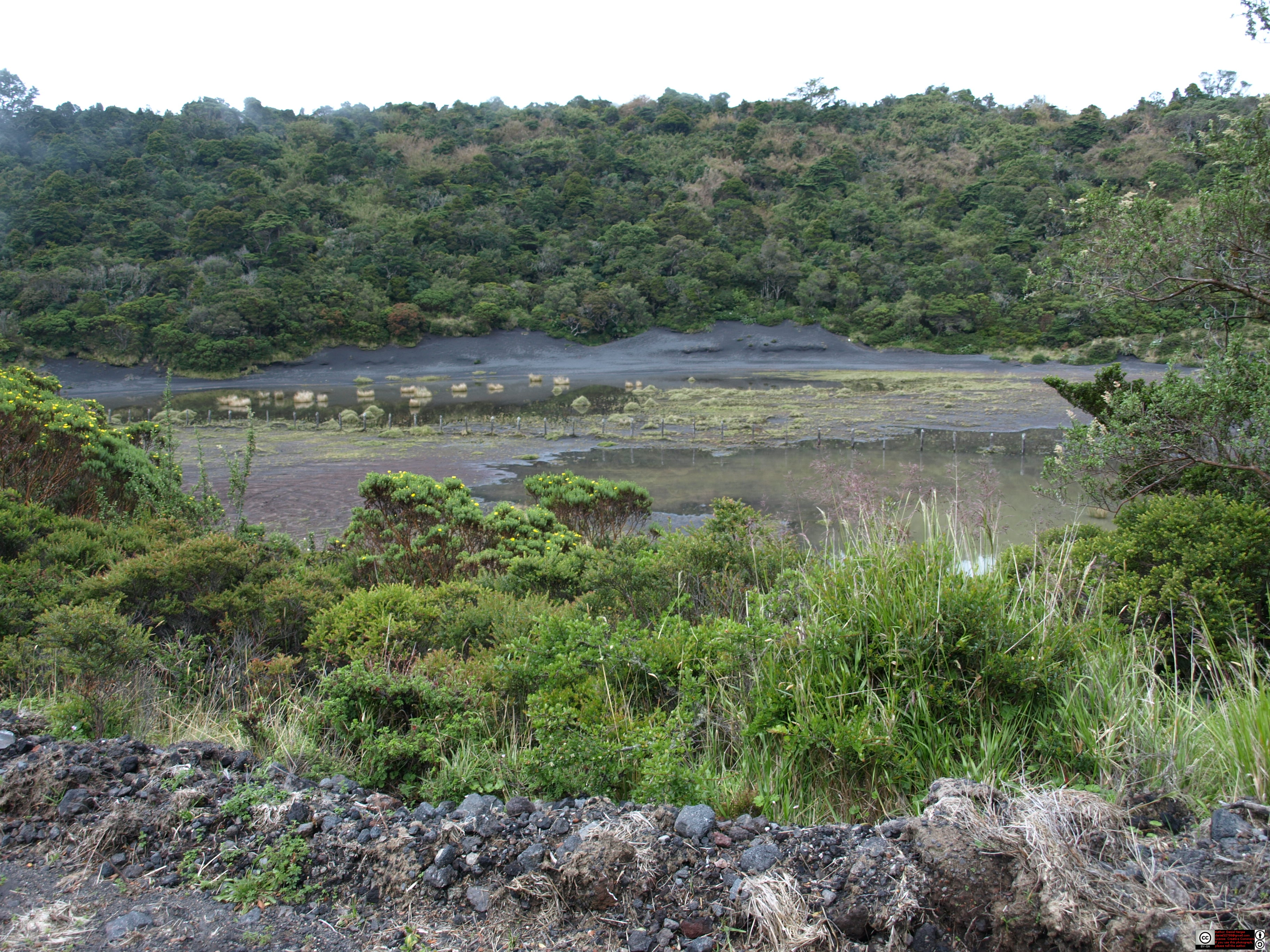
Playa Hermosa extinct crater

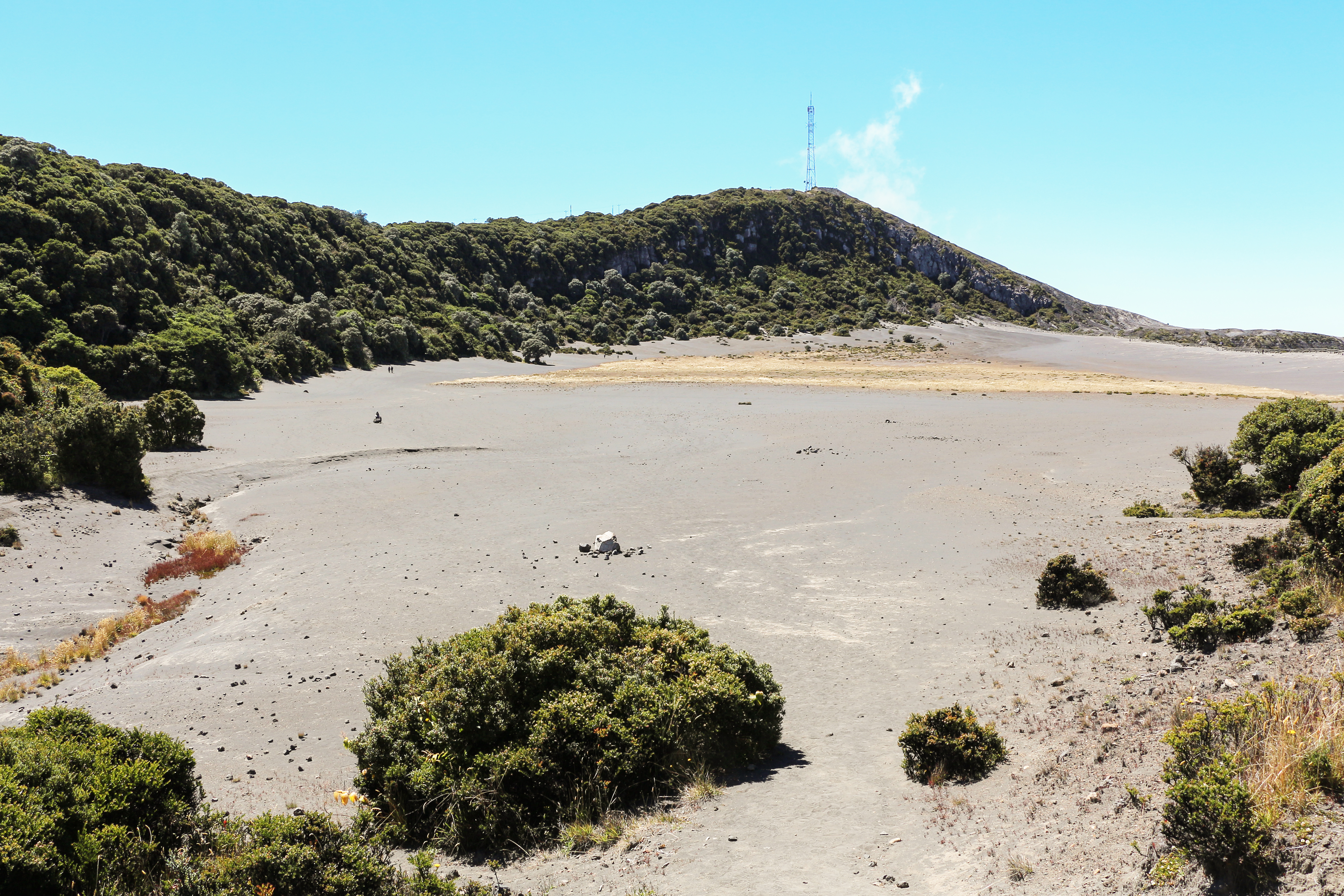
Playa Hermosa extinct crater

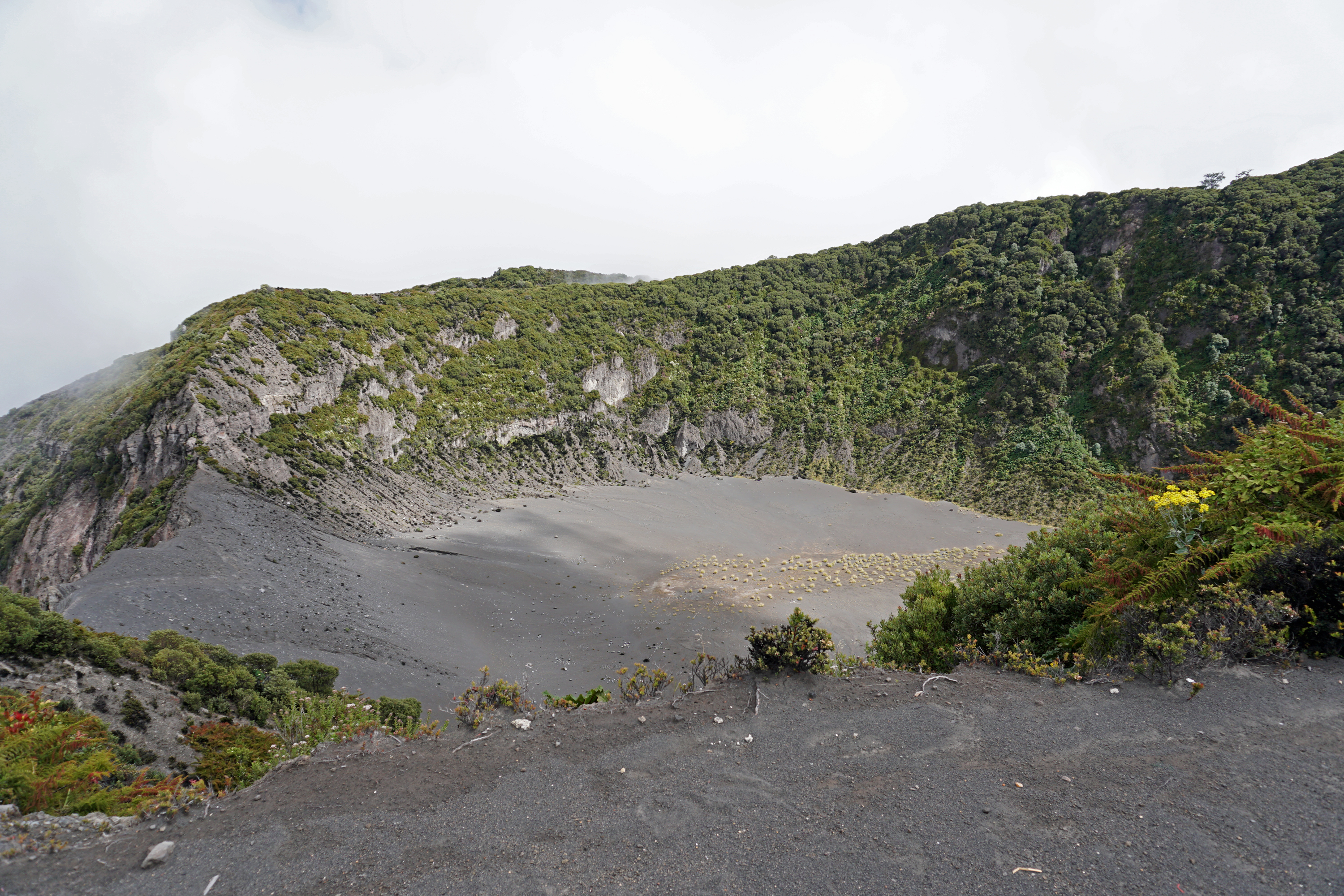
Diego de la Haya crater

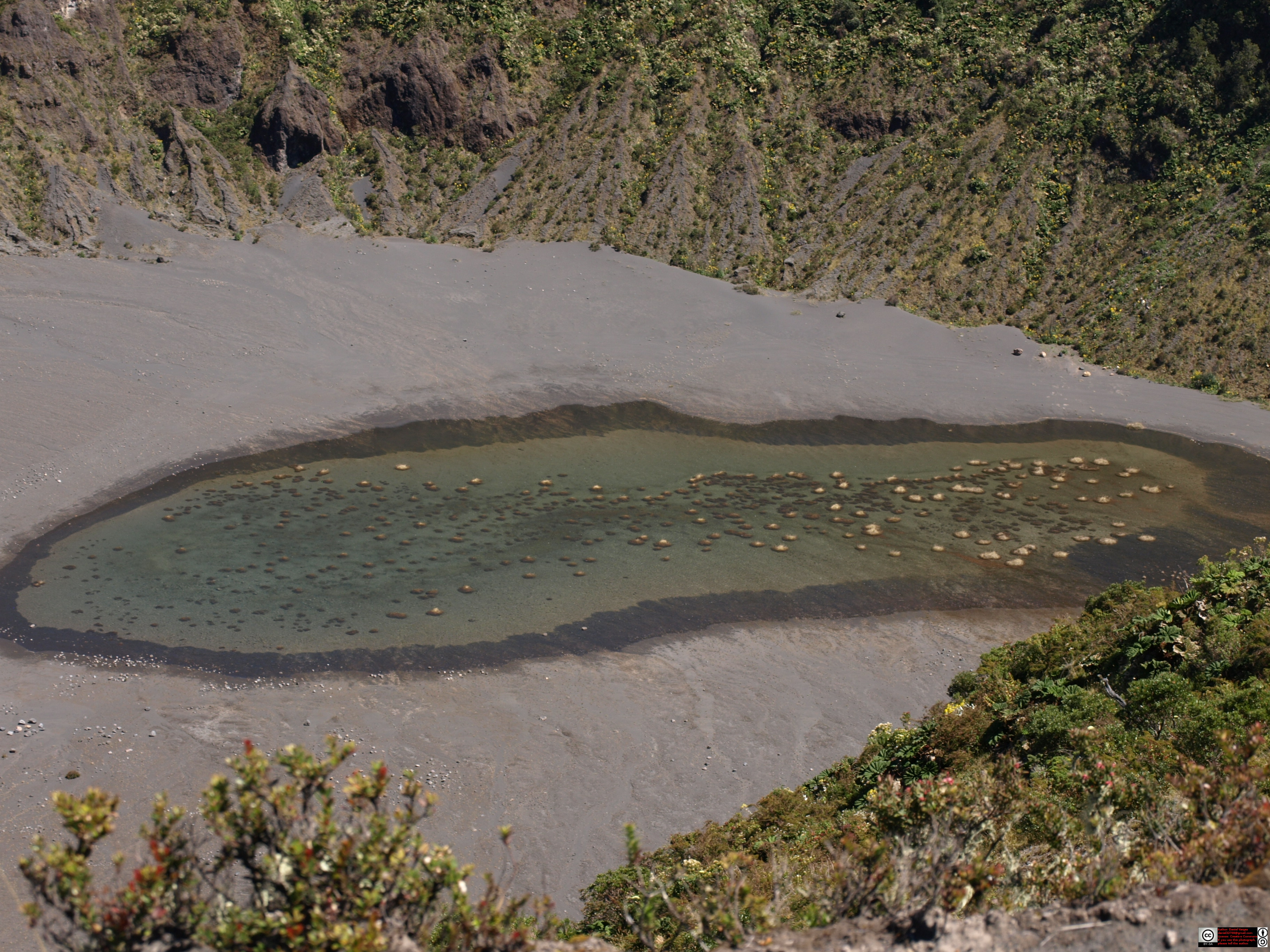
Diego de la Haya lagoon

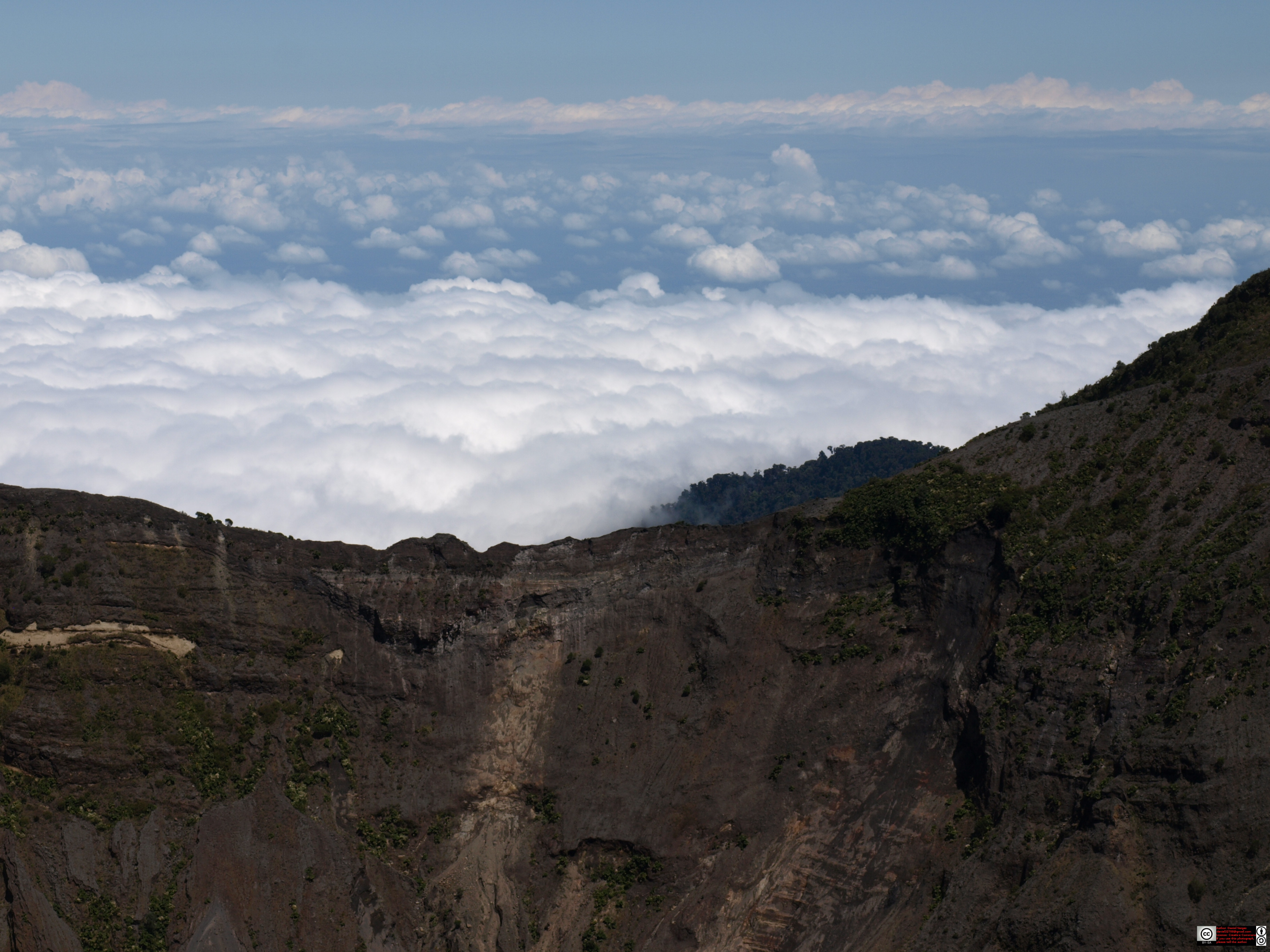
Great crater wall

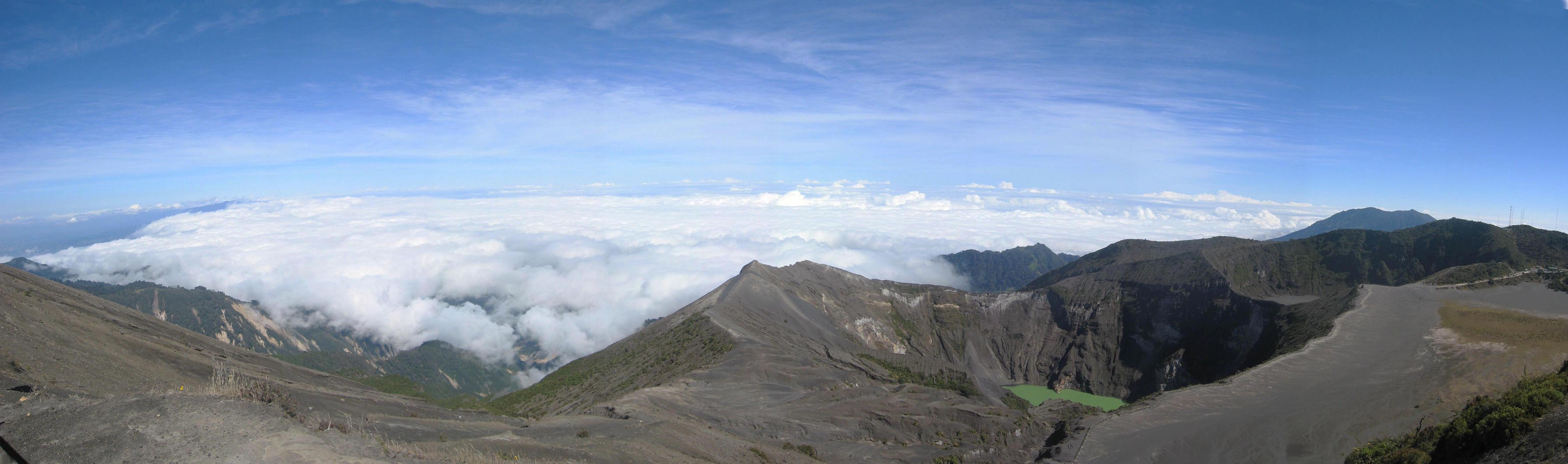
Distant wide view of Irazu volcano

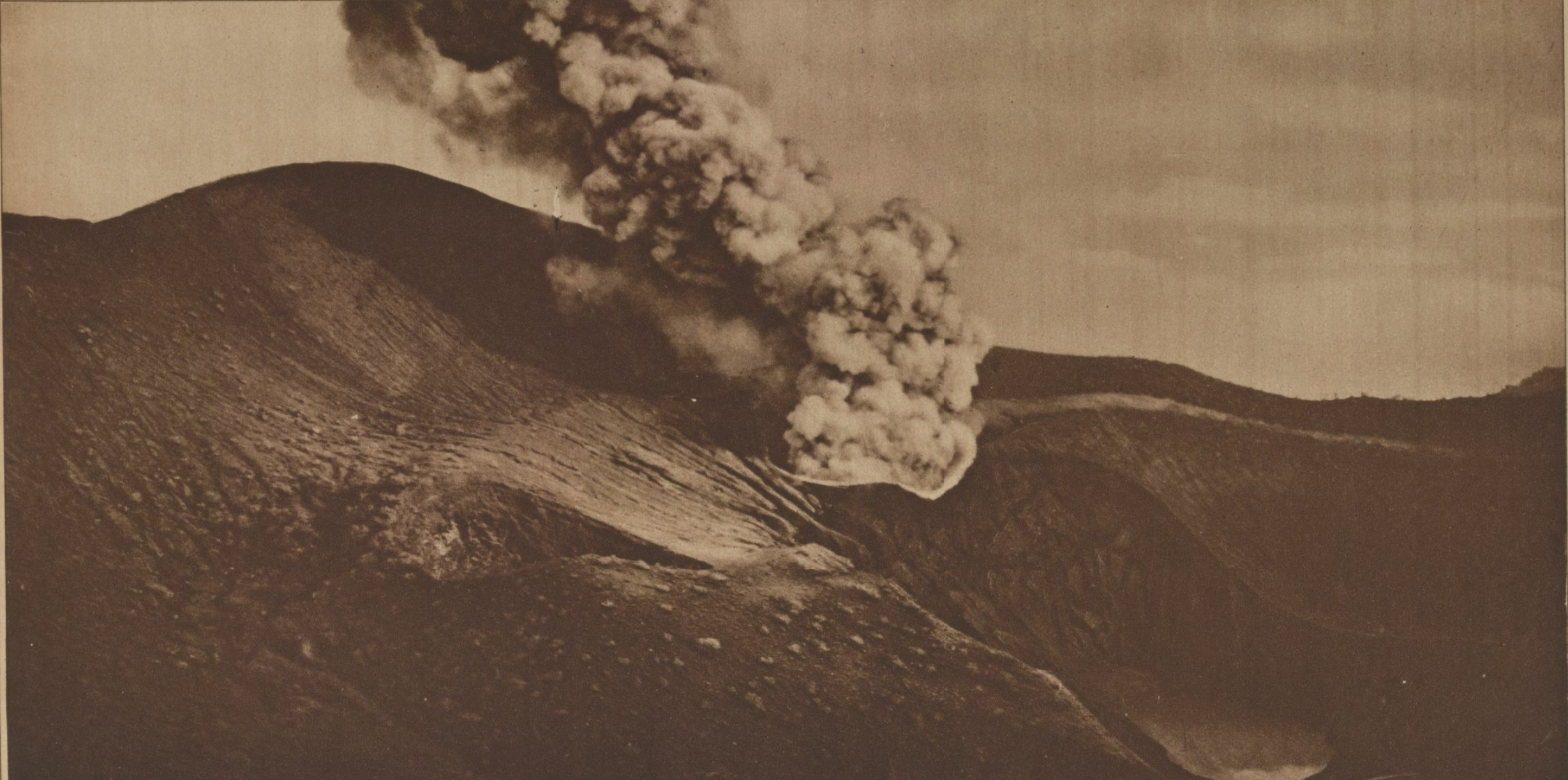
1918 eruption

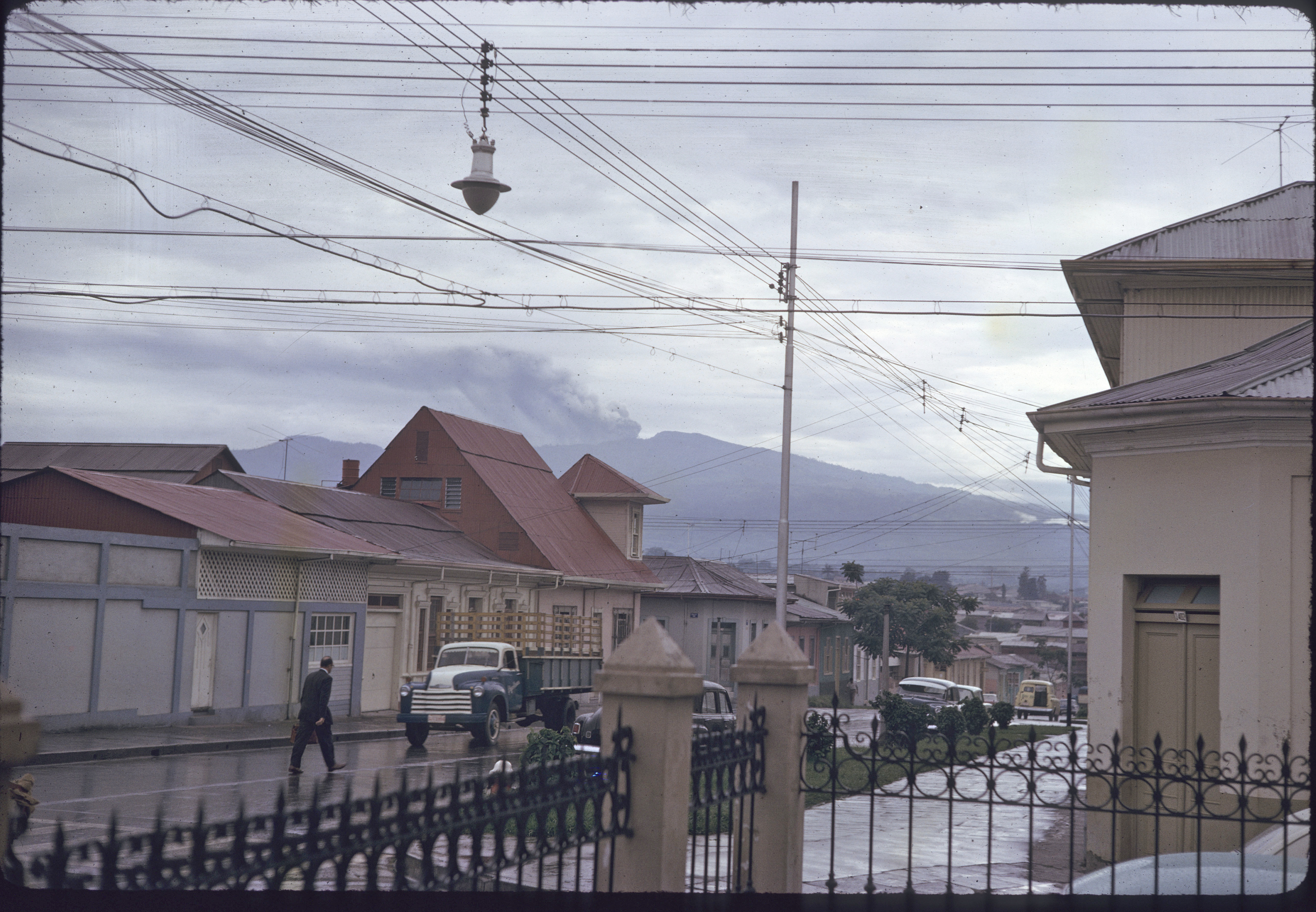
1963 eruption from San José

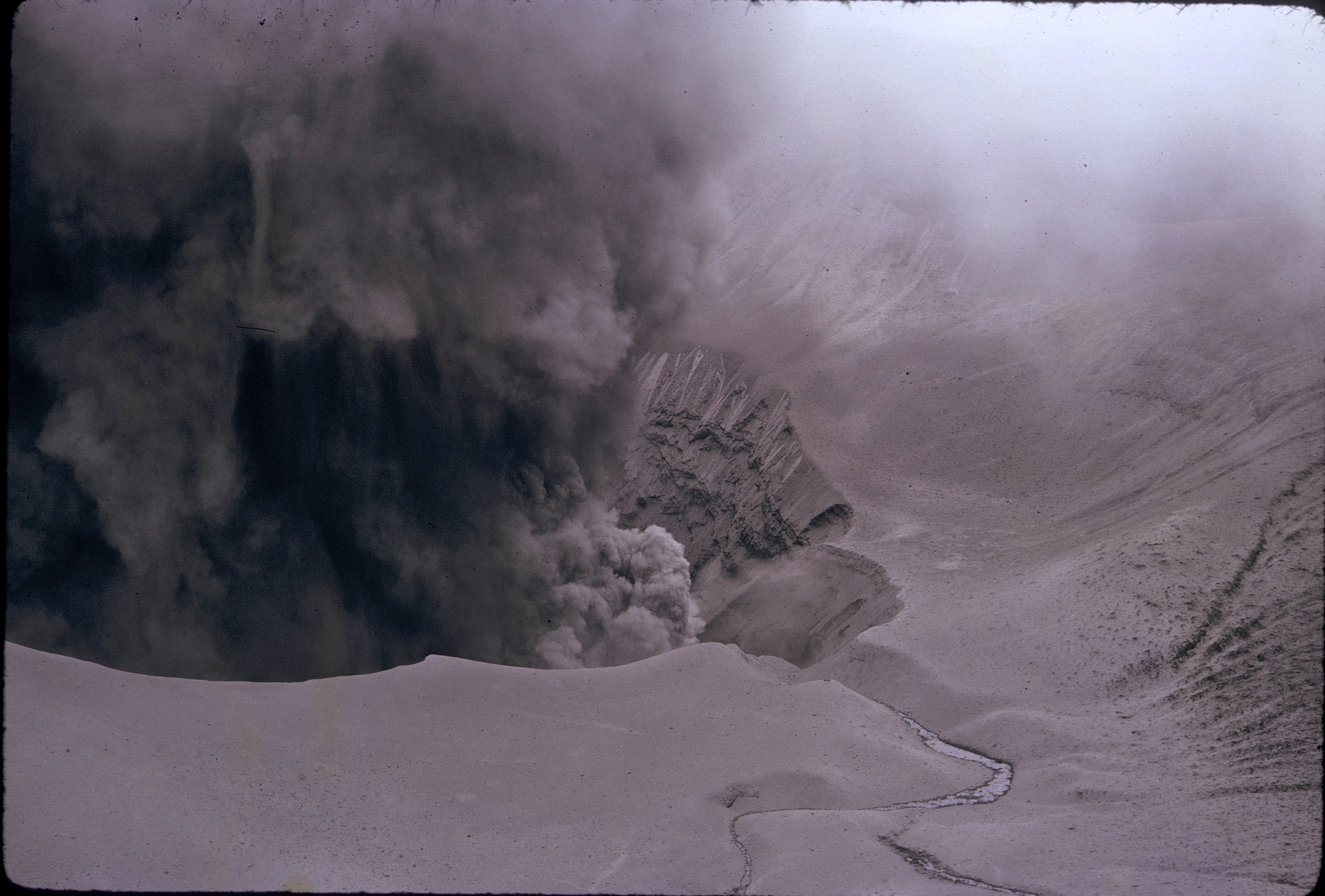
1963 eruption

== See also ==
- List of volcanoes in Costa Rica
- Irazú Volcano National Park
