= Calpocalyx =

Scientific classification
- Kingdom: Plantae
- Clade: Tracheophytes
- Clade: Angiosperms
- Clade: Eudicots
- Clade: Rosids
- Order: Fabales
- Family: Fabaceae
- Subfamily: Caesalpinioideae
- Clade: Mimosoid clade
- Genus: Calpocalyx; Harms (1897)

Species
- 11; see text

Genus of legumes

Calpocalyx is a genus of flowering plants in the family Fabaceae. It contains 11 species of trees native to west and west-central tropical Africa. They are typically found in tropical rain forest, often in riverine or littoral areas.

== Species ==
- Calpocalyx atlanticus Villiers
- Calpocalyx aubrevillei Pellegr.
- Calpocalyx brevibracteatus Harms
- Calpocalyx brevifolius Villiers
- Calpocalyx cauliflorus Hoyle
- Calpocalyx dinklagei Harms
- Calpocalyx heitzii Pellegr.
- Calpocalyx klainei Pierre et Harms — misise, misizé, or mississé
- Calpocalyx letestui Pellegr.
- Calpocalyx ngouiensis Pellegr.
- Calpocalyx winkleri (Harms) Harms
