= Sciodaphyllum diplodactylum =

Conservation status
- Vulnerable (IUCN 2.3)

Scientific classification
- Kingdom: Plantae
- Clade: Tracheophytes
- Clade: Angiosperms
- Clade: Eudicots
- Clade: Asterids
- Order: Apiales
- Family: Araliaceae
- Genus: Sciodaphyllum
- Species: S. diplodactylum

Binomial name
- Sciodaphyllum diplodactylum (Harms) Lowry, G.M.Plunkett & M.M.Mora (2019)

Species of flowering plant

Sciodaphyllum diplodactylum is a species of plant in the family Araliaceae. It is a scrambling tree native to southern Colombia, Ecuador, and Peru.
