= Adenodolichos exellii =

Scientific classification
- Kingdom: Plantae
- Clade: Tracheophytes
- Clade: Angiosperms
- Clade: Eudicots
- Clade: Rosids
- Order: Fabales
- Family: Fabaceae
- Subfamily: Faboideae
- Genus: Adenodolichos
- Species: A. exellii

Binomial name
- Adenodolichos exellii Torre

Species of plant

Adenodolichos exellii is a plant in the legume family Fabaceae, native to tropical Africa.

== Description ==
Adenodolichos exellii grows as a shrub, measuring up to 1 metre (3 ft) tall, rarely to 2.5 metres (8 ft). The leaves consist of three elliptic leaflets, measuring up to 17 cm (7 in) long, pubescent on both surfaces. Inflorescences are terminal, featuring purple to red flowers.

== Distribution and habitat ==
Adenodolichos exellii is native to Angola and Zambia. Its habitat is in woodland.
