= Piptadenia weberbaueri =

Conservation status
- Vulnerable (IUCN 2.3)

Scientific classification
- Kingdom: Plantae
- Clade: Tracheophytes
- Clade: Angiosperms
- Clade: Eudicots
- Clade: Rosids
- Order: Fabales
- Family: Fabaceae
- Subfamily: Caesalpinioideae
- Clade: Mimosoid clade
- Genus: Piptadenia
- Species: P. weberbaueri

Binomial name
- Piptadenia weberbaueri Harms

Species of plant

Piptadenia weberbaueri is a species of flowering plant in the family Fabaceae. It is found only in Peru.
