= Adenodolichos baumii =

Scientific classification
- Kingdom: Plantae
- Clade: Tracheophytes
- Clade: Angiosperms
- Clade: Eudicots
- Clade: Rosids
- Order: Fabales
- Family: Fabaceae
- Subfamily: Faboideae
- Genus: Adenodolichos
- Species: A. baumii

Binomial name
- Adenodolichos baumii Harms

Species of plant

Adenodolichos baumii is a plant in the legume family Fabaceae, native to tropical Africa.

== Description ==
Adenodolichos baumii grows as a shrub, measuring up to 2 metres (7 ft) tall. The leaves consist of three oblong leaflets, measuring up to 10 cm (4 in) long, puberulous above and pubescent below. Inflorescences are terminal, featuring crimson to purplish to near black flowers. The fruits are oblanceolate or falcate pods measuring up to 8 cm (3 in) long.

== Distribution and habitat ==
Adenodolichos baumii is native to the Democratic Republic of the Congo, Angola and Zambia. Its habitat is in woodland.
