= Oreopanax stenophyllus =

Conservation status
- Vulnerable (IUCN 2.3)

Scientific classification
- Kingdom: Plantae
- Clade: Tracheophytes
- Clade: Angiosperms
- Clade: Eudicots
- Clade: Asterids
- Order: Apiales
- Family: Araliaceae
- Genus: Oreopanax
- Species: O. stenophyllus

Binomial name
- Oreopanax stenophyllus Harms

Species of plant

Oreopanax stenophyllus is an evergreen shrub or treelet belonging to the family Araliaceae. It is endemic to the cloud forests found on the eastern slopes of the Peruvian Andes, typically occurring at elevations between 2800 and 3700 meters above sea level.
