= Adenopodia rotundifolia =

Conservation status
- Endangered (IUCN 3.1)

Scientific classification
- Kingdom: Plantae
- Clade: Tracheophytes
- Clade: Angiosperms
- Clade: Eudicots
- Clade: Rosids
- Order: Fabales
- Family: Fabaceae
- Subfamily: Caesalpinioideae
- Clade: Mimosoid clade
- Genus: Adenopodia
- Species: A. rotundifolia

Binomial name
- Adenopodia rotundifolia (Harms) Brenan

Synonyms
- Entada rotundifolia Harms; Entadopsis rotundifolia (Harms) Pedro; Pseudoentada rotundifolia (Harms) P.Guinet

Species of legume

Adenopodia rotundifolia is a species of flowering plant in the family Fabaceae. It is a shrub or tree native to Somalia and Tanzania.
