= Sciodaphyllum dolichostylum =

Conservation status
- Vulnerable (IUCN 2.3)

Scientific classification
- Kingdom: Plantae
- Clade: Tracheophytes
- Clade: Angiosperms
- Clade: Eudicots
- Clade: Asterids
- Order: Apiales
- Family: Araliaceae
- Genus: Sciodaphyllum
- Species: S. dolichostylum

Binomial name
- Sciodaphyllum dolichostylum Harms

Synonyms
- Schefflera dolichostyla Harms (1908)

Species of plant

Sciodaphyllum dolichostylum is a species of plant in the family Araliaceae. It a tree is native to Ecuador and Peru. It grows in Andean cloud forest, including in the departments of Puno and Cuzco in Peru.
