= Adenodolichos punctatus =

Scientific classification
- Kingdom: Plantae
- Clade: Tracheophytes
- Clade: Angiosperms
- Clade: Eudicots
- Clade: Rosids
- Order: Fabales
- Family: Fabaceae
- Subfamily: Faboideae
- Genus: Adenodolichos
- Species: A. punctatus

Binomial name
- Adenodolichos punctatus (Micheli) Harms

Subspecies
- Adenodolichos punctatus subsp. bussei (Harms) Verdc.; Adenodolichos punctatus subsp. decumbens (Verdc.) Verdc.

Synonyms
- Adenodolichos obtusifolius R.E.Fr.; Vigna punctata Micheli

Species of plant

Adenodolichos punctatus is a plant in the legume family Fabaceae, native to tropical Africa.

== Description ==
Adenodolichos punctatus grows as a shrub, from 0.45–1.5 metres (1–5 ft) tall. The leaves consist of three leaflets, measuring up to 9 cm (4 in) long, rarely up to 15 cm (6 in). Inflorescences feature white, green or purplish flowers. The fruits are oblanceolate pods measuring up to 5 cm (2 in) long.

== Distribution and habitat ==
Adenodolichos punctatus is native to south-central and southern tropical Africa, from the Democratic Republic of the Congo southeast to Mozambique. Its habitat is in woodland.
