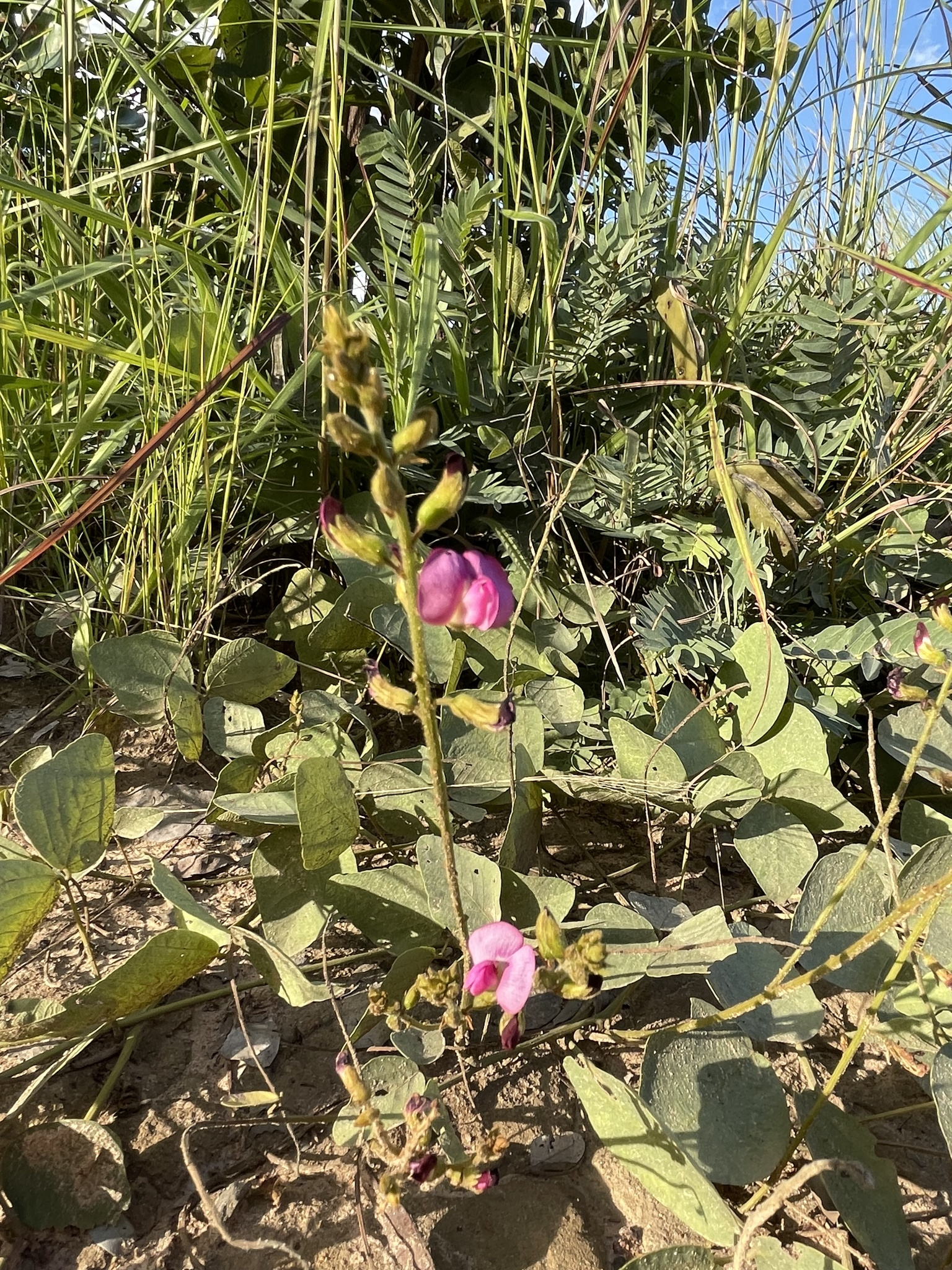

Scientific classification
- Kingdom: Plantae
- Clade: Tracheophytes
- Clade: Angiosperms
- Clade: Eudicots
- Clade: Rosids
- Order: Fabales
- Family: Fabaceae
- Subfamily: Faboideae
- Clade: Millettioids
- Tribe: Phaseoleae
- Subtribe: Cajaninae
- Genus: Adenodolichos; Harms

= Adenodolichos =

Genus of legumes

Adenodolichos is a genus of shrubs in the legume family Fabaceae, native to tropical Africa.

== Species ==
As of June 2020, Plants of the World Online recognises the following species:

- Adenodolichos acutifoliolatus Verdc.
- Adenodolichos baumii Harms
- Adenodolichos bequaertii De Wild.
- Adenodolichos brevipetiolatus R.Wilczek
- Adenodolichos caeruleus R.Wilczek
- Adenodolichos exellii Torre
- Adenodolichos grandifoliolatus De Wild.
- Adenodolichos harmsianus De Wild.
- Adenodolichos helenae Buscal. & Muschl.
- Adenodolichos huillensis Torre
- Adenodolichos kaessneri Harms
- Adenodolichos katangensis R.Wilczek
- Adenodolichos mendesii Torre
- Adenodolichos nanus N.E.Br.
- Adenodolichos oblongifoliolatus R.Wilczek
- Adenodolichos pachyrhizus De Wild.
- Adenodolichos paniculatus (Hua) Hutch.
- Adenodolichos punctatus (Micheli) Harms
- Adenodolichos rhomboideus (O.Hoffm.) Harms
- Adenodolichos rupestris Verdc.
- Adenodolichos salvifoliolatus R.Wilczek
- Adenodolichos upembaensis R.Wilczek
