= Adenodolichos rhomboideus =

Scientific classification
- Kingdom: Plantae
- Clade: Tracheophytes
- Clade: Angiosperms
- Clade: Eudicots
- Clade: Rosids
- Order: Fabales
- Family: Fabaceae
- Subfamily: Faboideae
- Genus: Adenodolichos
- Species: A. rhomboideus

Binomial name
- Adenodolichos rhomboideus (O.Hoffm.) Harms

Synonyms
- Adenodolichos anchietae (Hiern) Harms; Adenodolichos euryphyllus Harms; Dolichos anchietae Hiern; Dolichos rhomboideus O.Hoffm.

Species of plant

Adenodolichos rhomboideus is a plant in the legume family Fabaceae, native to tropical Africa.

== Description ==
Adenodolichos rhomboideus grows as a subshrub. The leaves consist of three ovate leaflets, measuring up to 16 centimetres (6 in) long, puberulous above and pubescent below. Inflorescences are terminal, featuring crimson or purple flowers. The fruits are oblanceolate or falcate pods measuring up to 5.3 cm (2 in) long.

== Distribution and habitat ==
Adenodolichos rhomboideus is native to the Democratic Republic of the Congo, Angola, Zambia, Malawi and Mozambique. Its habitat is in woodland.
