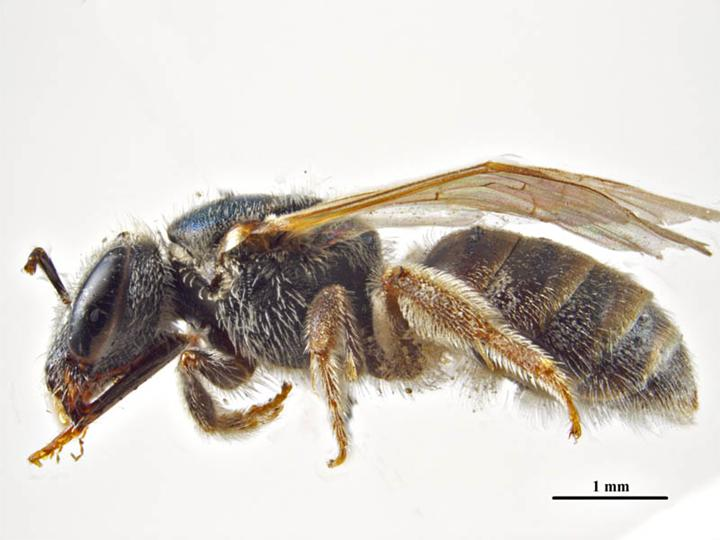
- Female

Scientific classification
- Kingdom: Animalia
- Phylum: Arthropoda
- Clade: Pancrustacea
- Class: Insecta
- Order: Hymenoptera
- Family: Halictidae
- Genus: Lasioglossum
- Species: L. cognatum

Binomial name
- Lasioglossum cognatum Smith, 1853

Synonyms
- Halictus cognatus Smith, 1853; Halictus inclinans Smith, 1879; Halictus haematostoma Cockerell, 1914; Halictus subinclinans Cockerell, 1915

= Lasioglossum cognatum =

Species of bee

Lasioglossum cognatum, or Lasioglossum (Chilalictus) cognatum, is a species of bee in the family Halictidae and subfamily Halictinae. It is endemic to Australia. It was described by English entomologist Frederick Smith in 1853.

== Distribution and habitat ==
The species occurs across much of Australia. Type localities include Geraldton, Western Australia; Windsor, Victoria; and Launceston, Tasmania.

== Behaviour ==
The adults are flying mellivores. Flowering plants visited by the bees include Acacia, Antirrhinum, Arctotheca, Argemone, Argyranthemum, Asphodelus, Atalaya, Borago, Brassica, Brunonia, Bulbine, Bursaria, Cakile, Caladenia, Calystegia, Calytrix, Carpobrotus, Chrysanthemum, Citrus, Coreopsis, Cotinus, Crotalaria, Eremophila, Eucalyptus, Frankenia, Geum, Goodenia, Grevillea, Hakea, Harmsiodoxa, Helichrysum, Heliotropium, Hibbertia, Jacksonia, Leptospermum, Limonium, Melaleuca, Mesembryanthemum, Muehlenbeckia, Myriocephalus, Nitraria, Nymphoides, Oxalis, Potentilla, Prostanthera, Psoralea, Pultenaea, Rapistrum, Reseda, Salsola, Samolus, Santalum, Schinus, Senecio, Solanum, Solidago, Spyridium, Stemodia, Taraxacum, Terminalia, Thymus, Velleia, Veronica, Wahlenbergia and Zygophyllum species.

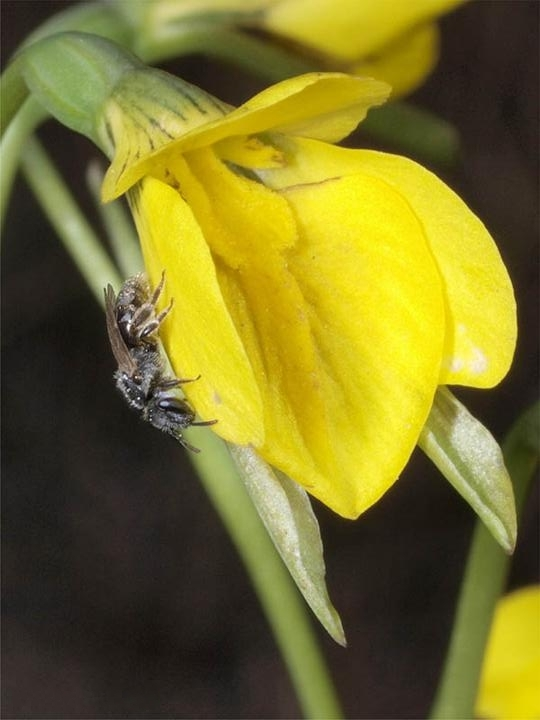
On Diuris basaltica

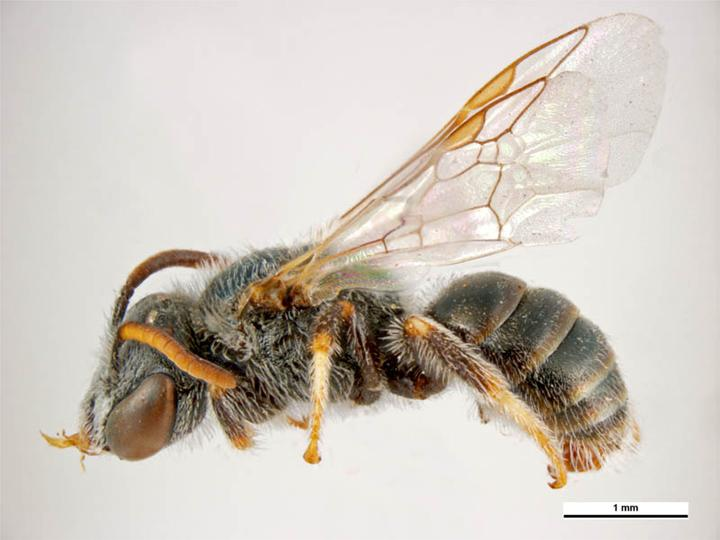
Male
