= Oreopanax candamoanus =

Conservation status
- Vulnerable (IUCN 2.3)

Scientific classification
- Kingdom: Plantae
- Clade: Tracheophytes
- Clade: Angiosperms
- Clade: Eudicots
- Clade: Asterids
- Order: Apiales
- Family: Araliaceae
- Genus: Oreopanax
- Species: O. candamoanus

Binomial name
- Oreopanax candamoanus Harms

Species of tree

Oreopanax candamoanus is a species of plant in the family Araliaceae. It is endemic to Peru.
