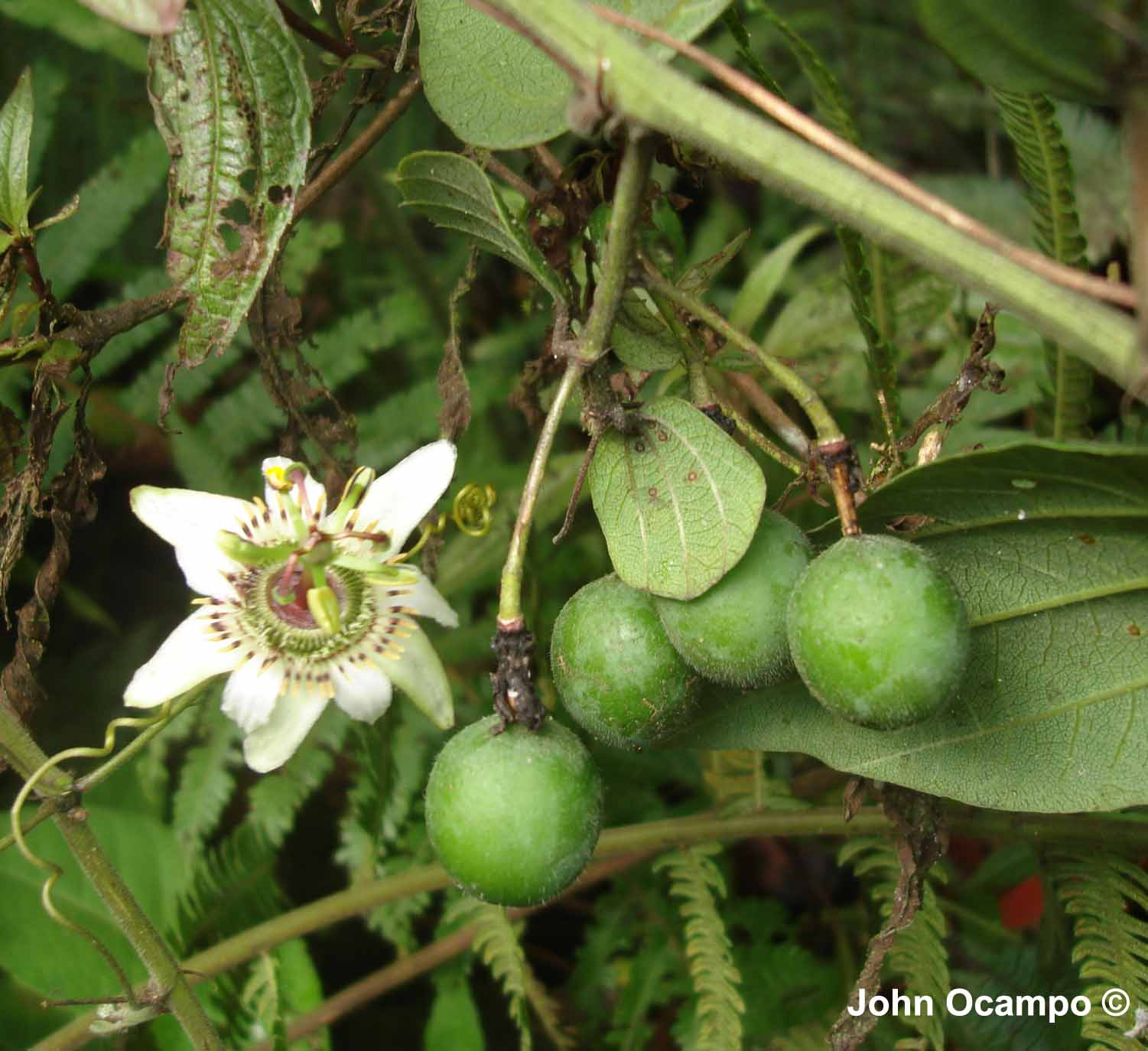
- P. cuspidifolia fruits and flowers

Scientific classification
- Kingdom: Plantae
- Clade: Tracheophytes
- Clade: Angiosperms
- Clade: Eudicots
- Clade: Rosids
- Order: Malpighiales
- Family: Passifloraceae
- Genus: Passiflora
- Species: P. cuspidifolia

Binomial name
- Passiflora cuspidifolia Harms

= Passiflora cuspidifolia =

Species of vine

Passiflora cuspidifolia is a species of passion fruit.
