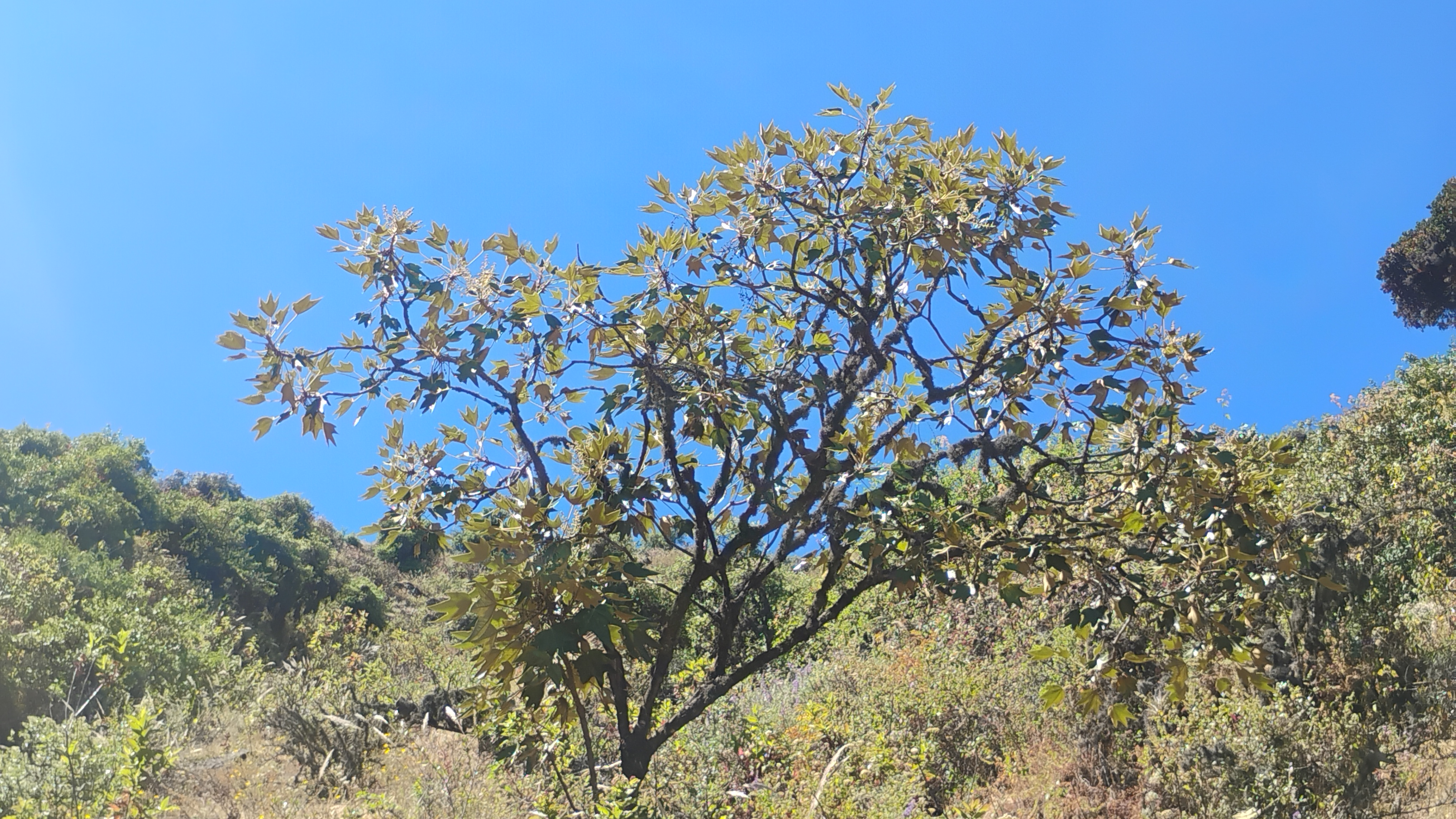
- Oreopanax oroyanus in Ancash, Peru

Scientific classification
- Kingdom: Plantae
- Clade: Embryophytes
- Clade: Tracheophytes
- Clade: Spermatophytes
- Clade: Angiosperms
- Clade: Eudicots
- Clade: Asterids
- Order: Apiales
- Family: Araliaceae
- Genus: Oreopanax
- Species: O. oroyanus

Binomial name
- Oreopanax oroyanus Harms

= Oreopanax oroyanus =

Species of tree

Oreopanax oroyanus is an evergreen shrub or tree in the family Araliaceae, native to pockets of montane forest on the western slopes of the Peruvian Andes. It occurs at elevations between 2800 and 3800 meters above sea level.
