= Adenodolichos huillensis =

Scientific classification
- Kingdom: Plantae
- Clade: Tracheophytes
- Clade: Angiosperms
- Clade: Eudicots
- Clade: Rosids
- Order: Fabales
- Family: Fabaceae
- Subfamily: Faboideae
- Genus: Adenodolichos
- Species: A. huillensis

Binomial name
- Adenodolichos huillensis Torre

Species of plant

Adenodolichos huillensis is a plant in the legume family Fabaceae, native to Angola and Zambia.

== Description ==
Adenodolichos huillensis grows as a shrub, measuring up to 0.9 metres (3 ft) tall, or 2 metres (7 ft) long. The leaves consist of three leaflets, measuring up to 15.5 cm (6 in) long, pubescent to glabrous on the upper surface and glabrous below. Inflorescences are axillary or terminal and feature white, purple, blue or pink flowers. The fruits are oblanceolate or falcate pods measuring up to 4.5 cm (2 in) long.
