= Sciodaphyllum euryphyllum =

Conservation status
- Vulnerable (IUCN 2.3)

Scientific classification
- Kingdom: Plantae
- Clade: Tracheophytes
- Clade: Angiosperms
- Clade: Eudicots
- Clade: Asterids
- Order: Apiales
- Family: Araliaceae
- Genus: Sciodaphyllum
- Species: S. euryphyllum

Binomial name
- Sciodaphyllum euryphyllum (Harms) Lowry, G.M.Plunkett & M.M.Mora (2019)

Synonyms
- Schefflera euryphylla Harms (1908)

Species of plant

Sciodaphyllum euryphyllum is a species of plant in the family Araliaceae. It is endemic to Peru. It is known only from Junin Department, where it grows in Andean cloud forests.
