= Adenodolichos kaessneri =

Conservation status
- Least Concern (IUCN 3.1)

Scientific classification
- Kingdom: Plantae
- Clade: Tracheophytes
- Clade: Angiosperms
- Clade: Eudicots
- Clade: Rosids
- Order: Fabales
- Family: Fabaceae
- Subfamily: Faboideae
- Genus: Adenodolichos
- Species: A. kaessneri

Binomial name
- Adenodolichos kaessneri Harms

Species of plant

Adenodolichos kaessneri is a plant in the legume family Fabaceae, native to central Africa.

== Description ==
Adenodolichos kaessneri grows as a shrub, from 0.9–1.8 metres (3–6 ft) tall. The leaves consist of up to 3 pairs of elliptical leaflets, pubescent above and beneath and measuring up to 11.5 cm (5 in) long. Inflorescences have flowers featuring white petals with coloured veins. The fruits are pods measuring 4–5.5 cm (1.6–2.2 in) long.

== Distribution and habitat ==
Adenodolichos kaessneri is native to the Democratic Republic of the Congo and Tanzania. Its habitat is in grassland, savanna and Brachystegia woodland. Some populations of the species are present in protected areas. In Tanzania, Adenodolichos kaessneri is found at altitudes from 1,000–1,600 m (3,300–5,200 ft).
