= Sciodaphyllum tremuloideum =

Scientific classification
- Kingdom: Plantae
- Clade: Tracheophytes
- Clade: Angiosperms
- Clade: Eudicots
- Clade: Asterids
- Order: Apiales
- Family: Araliaceae
- Genus: Sciodaphyllum
- Species: S. tremuloideum

Binomial name
- Sciodaphyllum tremuloideum (Maguire, Steyerm. & Frodin) Lowry, G.M.Plunkett & M.M.Mora (2019)

Synonyms
- Schefflera tremuloidea Maguire, Steyerm. & Frodin (1984)

Species of flowering plant from South America

Sciodaphyllum tremuloideum is a species of flowering plant in the family Araliaceae.

== Distribution ==
It is endemic to Brazil and Venezuela.
