= Sciodaphyllum vasquezianum =

Conservation status
- Least Concern (IUCN 3.1)

Scientific classification
- Kingdom: Plantae
- Clade: Tracheophytes
- Clade: Angiosperms
- Clade: Eudicots
- Clade: Asterids
- Order: Apiales
- Family: Araliaceae
- Genus: Sciodaphyllum
- Species: S. vasquezianum

Binomial name
- Sciodaphyllum vasquezianum (Harms) Lowry, G.M.Plunkett & M.M.Mora (2019)

Synonyms
- Schefflera vasqueziana Harms (1937)

Species of plant

Sciodaphyllum vasquezianum is a species of flowering plant in the family Araliaceae. It is a scrambling tree endemic to Colombia.
