= Sciodaphyllum acuminatum =

Conservation status
- Least Concern (IUCN 3.1)

Scientific classification
- Kingdom: Plantae
- Clade: Tracheophytes
- Clade: Angiosperms
- Clade: Eudicots
- Clade: Asterids
- Order: Apiales
- Family: Araliaceae
- Genus: Sciodaphyllum
- Species: S. acuminatum

Binomial name
- Sciodaphyllum acuminatum (Pav.) Poir.

Synonyms
- Actinophyllum acuminatum Pav. (1797); Actinophyllum conicum Pav. (1797); Brassaia acuminata (Pav.) Hutch. (1967); Brassaia conica (Pav.) Hutch. (1967); Schefflera acuminata (Pav.) Harms (1894); Schefflera conica (Pav.) Harms (1894); Schefflera microcephala Harms in Bot. Jahrb. Syst. 42: 148 (1908); Sciodaphyllum conicum (Pav.) Poir. (1805)

Species of flowering plant

Sciadophyllum acuminatum is a flowering plant in the family Araliaceae. It a medium-sized tree native to Peru and Ecuador.

It grows in montane forests on the eastern slope of the Andes from 1,000 to 3,000 metres elevation.
