= Sciodaphyllum urbanianum =

Conservation status
- Vulnerable (IUCN 2.3)

Scientific classification
- Kingdom: Plantae
- Clade: Tracheophytes
- Clade: Angiosperms
- Clade: Eudicots
- Clade: Asterids
- Order: Apiales
- Family: Araliaceae
- Genus: Sciodaphyllum
- Species: S. urbanianum

Binomial name
- Sciodaphyllum urbanianum (Marchal ex Urb.) Lowry, G.M.Plunkett & M.M.Mora (2019)

Synonyms
- Didymopanax urbanianus Marchal ex Urb. (1892); Schefflera urbaniana (Marchal ex Urb.) Frodin (1989)

Species of flowering plant

Sciodaphyllum urbanianum is a species of plant in the family Araliaceae. It is a tree endemic to Martinique.
