= Calpocalyx cauliflorus =

Conservation status
- Vulnerable (IUCN 2.3)

Scientific classification
- Kingdom: Plantae
- Clade: Tracheophytes
- Clade: Angiosperms
- Clade: Eudicots
- Clade: Rosids
- Order: Fabales
- Family: Fabaceae
- Subfamily: Caesalpinioideae
- Clade: Mimosoid clade
- Genus: Calpocalyx
- Species: C. cauliflorus

Binomial name
- Calpocalyx cauliflorus Hoyle

Species of legume

Calpocalyx cauliflorus is a species of flowering plant in the family Fabaceae. It is found in Cameroon and Nigeria.
