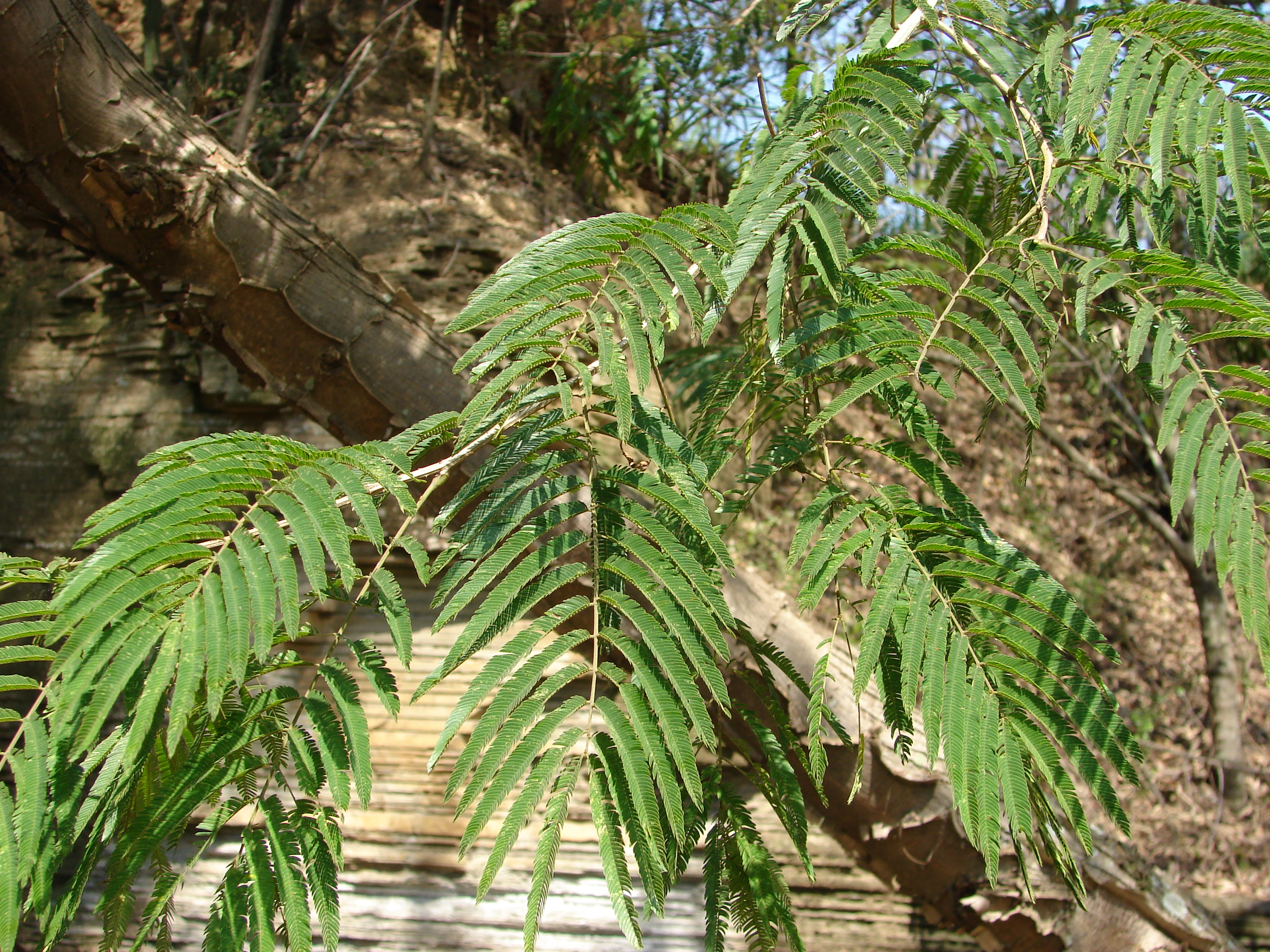
- Piptadenia gonoacantha in Brazil

Scientific classification
- Kingdom: Plantae
- Clade: Tracheophytes
- Clade: Angiosperms
- Clade: Eudicots
- Clade: Rosids
- Order: Fabales
- Family: Fabaceae
- Subfamily: Caesalpinioideae
- Clade: Mimosoid clade
- Genus: Piptadenia; Benth. (1840)

Species
- 28; see text

Synonyms
- Stachychrysum Bojer (1837)

= Piptadenia =

Genus of legumes

Piptadenia is a genus of tropical shrubs and trees of the family Fabaceae. It includes 28 species native to the tropical Americas, ranging from central Mexico to southern Brazil and northwestern Argentina.

== Species ==
28 species are accepted:

- Piptadenia adiantoides (Spreng.) Macbr.
- Piptadenia affinis Burkart
- Piptadenia amazonica Ducke
- Piptadenia anolidurus Barneby
- Piptadenia boliviana Benth.
- Piptadenia buchtienii Barneby
- Piptadenia cuzcoensis Barneby
- Piptadenia floribunda Kleinhoonte
- Piptadenia gonoacantha (Mart.) Macbr.
- Piptadenia imatacae Barneby
- Piptadenia irwinii G.P.Lewis
  - var. irwinii G.P.Lewis
  - var. unijuga G.P.Lewis

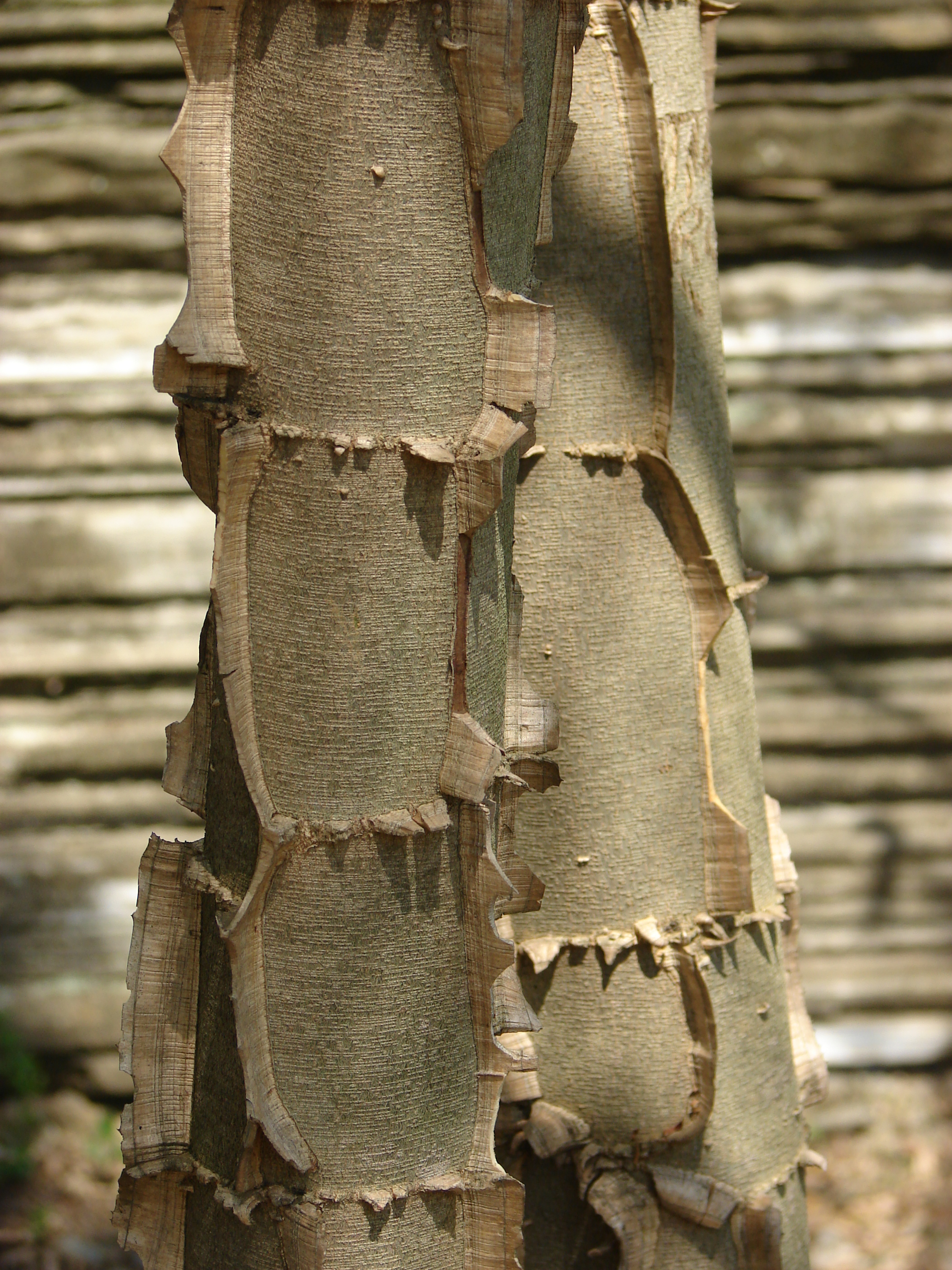
Piptadenia gonoacantha young trunk

- Piptadenia killipii Macbr.
  - var. cacaophila G.P.Lewis
  - var. killipii Macbr.
- Piptadenia laxipinna B.M.Barroso
- Piptadenia leucoxylon Barneby & Grimes
- Piptadenia macradenia Benth.
- Piptadenia micracantha Benth.
- Piptadenia minutiflora Ducke
- Piptadenia paniculata Benth.
- Piptadenia peruviana (J.F.Macbr.) Barneby
- Piptadenia pteroclada Benth.
- Piptadenia ramosissima (Mart. ex Colla) Benth.
- Piptadenia retusa (Jacq.) P.G.Ribeiro, Seigler & Ebinger
- Piptadenia robusta Pittier
- Piptadenia santosii Barneby ex G.P.Lewis
- Piptadenia trisperma (Vell.) Benth.
- Piptadenia uaupensis Spruce ex Benth.
- Piptadenia uliginosa Britton & Killip
- Piptadenia voronoffii Pittier.
- Piptadenia weberbaueri Harms

Several species formerly placed in this genus (such as those used to prepare the psychotomimetic snuffs vilca and yopo/parica) are now considered to be in the genus Anadenanthera. Three species have also been placed in genus Adenopodia. Others have been moved to the genus Pityrocarpa.
