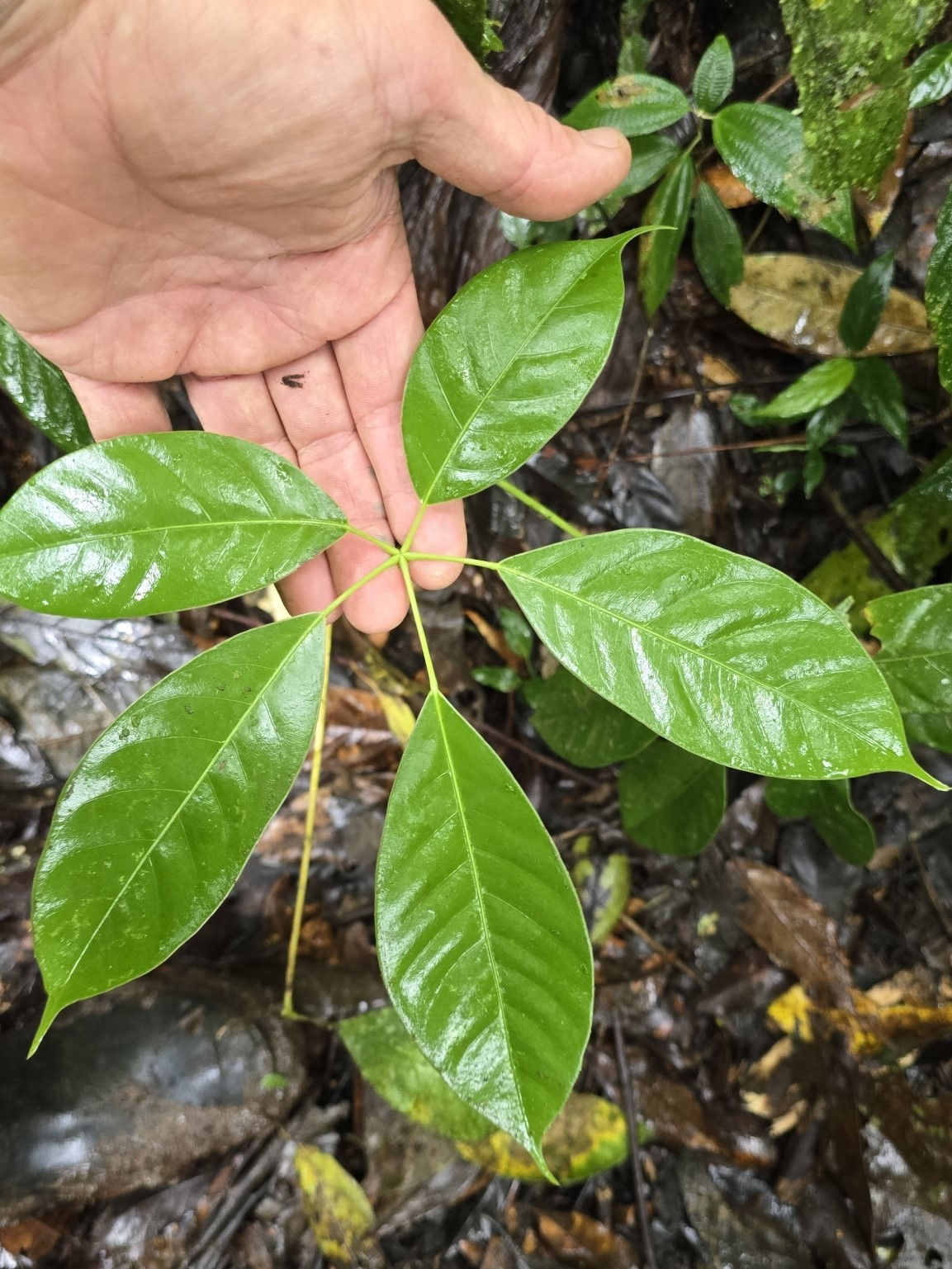

Conservation status
- Least Concern (IUCN 2.3)

Scientific classification
- Kingdom: Plantae
- Clade: Tracheophytes
- Clade: Angiosperms
- Clade: Eudicots
- Clade: Asterids
- Order: Apiales
- Family: Araliaceae
- Genus: Sciodaphyllum
- Species: S. sprucei

Binomial name
- Sciodaphyllum sprucei Seem. (1865)

Synonyms
- List: Brassaia sprucei (Seem.) Hutch. (1967); Brassaia klugii (Harms) Hutch. (1967); Schefflera cainarachiensis Harms (1942); Schefflera klugii Harms (1932); Schefflera sprucei (Seem.) Harms (1894); Schefflera ulei Harms ex Pilg. (1905)

= Sciodaphyllum sprucei =

Species of flowering plant

Sciodaphyllum sprucei is a species of plant in the family Araliaceae. It is a scrambling tree native to Colombia, Ecuador, and Peru.

Sciodaphyllum sprucei grows in lowland forests and jungles on the eastern slope of the Andes.
