= Adenodolichos paniculatus =

Scientific classification
- Kingdom: Plantae
- Clade: Tracheophytes
- Clade: Angiosperms
- Clade: Eudicots
- Clade: Rosids
- Order: Fabales
- Family: Fabaceae
- Subfamily: Faboideae
- Genus: Adenodolichos
- Species: A. paniculatus

Binomial name
- Adenodolichos paniculatus (Hua) Hutch.

Synonyms
- Adenodolichos macrothyrsus (Harms) Harms; Dolichos macrothyrsus Harms; Dolichos paniculatus Hua

Species of plant

Adenodolichos paniculatus is a plant in the legume family Fabaceae, native to tropical Africa. The specific epithet means 'with panicles', referring to the plant's many-branched inflorescence.

== Description ==
Adenodolichos paniculatus grows as a shrub, from 1.5–4.5 metres (5–15 ft) tall. The leaves consist of three to five ovate leaflets, glabrous above, glabrous or pubescent beneath and measuring up to 17 cm (7 in) long. Inflorescences feature panicles up to 24 cm (9 in) long with green or purple flowers. The fruits are elliptic pods measuring up to 4 cm (2 in) long.

== Distribution and habitat ==
Adenodolichos paniculatus is native to countries of tropical Africa, from Guinea in the west to Sudan in the east and south to the Democratic Republic of the Congo. Its habitat is in woodland and grassland at altitudes of 1,050–1,200 m (3,400–3,900 ft).
