= Sciodaphyllum albocapitatum =

Conservation status
- Endangered (IUCN 3.1)

Scientific classification
- Kingdom: Plantae
- Clade: Tracheophytes
- Clade: Angiosperms
- Clade: Eudicots
- Clade: Asterids
- Order: Apiales
- Family: Araliaceae
- Genus: Sciodaphyllum
- Species: S. albocapitatum

Binomial name
- Sciodaphyllum albocapitatum (M.J.Cannon & Cannon) Lowry, G.M.Plunkett & M.M.Mora (2019)

Synonyms
- Schefflera albocapitata M.J.Cannon & Cannon (1989)

Species of flowering plant

Sciodaphyllum albocapitatum is a flowering plant in the family Araliaceae. It is a small tree, which grows 5 to 10 meters tall. It flowers in June.

It is native to the mountains of Costa Rica and western Panama, where it grows in premontane rain forest from 1,000 to 1,300 meters elevation.
