= Sciodaphyllum troyanum =

Conservation status
- Vulnerable (IUCN 2.3)

Scientific classification
- Kingdom: Plantae
- Clade: Tracheophytes
- Clade: Angiosperms
- Clade: Eudicots
- Clade: Asterids
- Order: Apiales
- Family: Araliaceae
- Genus: Sciodaphyllum
- Species: S. troyanum

Binomial name
- Sciodaphyllum troyanum Urb. (1908)

Synonyms
- Actinophyllum troyanum (Urb.) R.C.Schneid. (1909); Schefflera troyana (Urb.) A.C.Sm. (1941)

Species of flowering plant

Sciodaphyllum troyanum is a species of plant in the family Araliaceae. It is a scrambling shrub or tree endemic to Jamaica. It is threatened by habitat loss.
