= Sciodaphyllum chartaceum =

Conservation status
- Least Concern (IUCN 3.1)

Scientific classification
- Kingdom: Plantae
- Clade: Tracheophytes
- Clade: Angiosperms
- Clade: Eudicots
- Clade: Asterids
- Order: Apiales
- Family: Araliaceae
- Genus: Sciodaphyllum
- Species: S. chartaceum

Binomial name
- Sciodaphyllum chartaceum A.C.Sm. (1938)

Synonyms
- Schefflera brenesii A.C.Sm. (1941)

Species of flowering plant

Sciodaphyllum chartaceum is a species of plant in the family Araliaceae. It is found in Costa Rica and Panama. It is threatened by habitat loss.

Sciodaphyllum chartaceum is a shrub or small tree which grows from 1 to 6 meters tall. It is often a climber or hemiepiphyte. It flowers from January to May and from July to December.

It grows in premontane and montane rain forests, extending into adjacent lowland rain forests, from 300 to 1,500 and occasionally to 2,400 meters elevation.
