= Oreopanax sanderianus =

Conservation status
- Least Concern (IUCN 3.1)

Scientific classification
- Kingdom: Plantae
- Clade: Tracheophytes
- Clade: Angiosperms
- Clade: Eudicots
- Clade: Asterids
- Order: Apiales
- Family: Araliaceae
- Genus: Oreopanax
- Species: O. sanderianus

Binomial name
- Oreopanax sanderianus Hemsl.

Species of tree

Oreopanax sanderianus is a species of plant in the family Araliaceae. It is found in Guatemala, Honduras, and Mexico. It is threatened by habitat loss.
