= Oreopanax arcanus =

Conservation status
- Vulnerable (IUCN 2.3)

Scientific classification
- Kingdom: Plantae
- Clade: Tracheophytes
- Clade: Angiosperms
- Clade: Eudicots
- Clade: Asterids
- Order: Apiales
- Family: Araliaceae
- Genus: Oreopanax
- Species: O. arcanus

Binomial name
- Oreopanax arcanus A.C. Smith

Species of plant

Oreopanax arcanus is a species of plant in the family Araliaceae. It is found in Guatemala and Mexico. It is threatened by habitat loss.
