= Adenodolichos rupestris =

Scientific classification
- Kingdom: Plantae
- Clade: Tracheophytes
- Clade: Angiosperms
- Clade: Eudicots
- Clade: Rosids
- Order: Fabales
- Family: Fabaceae
- Subfamily: Faboideae
- Genus: Adenodolichos
- Species: A. rupestris

Binomial name
- Adenodolichos rupestris Verdc.

Species of plant

Adenodolichos rupestris is a plant in the legume family Fabaceae, native to tropical Africa. The specific epithet means 'found near rocks', referring to where the species was initially encountered.

== Description ==
Adenodolichos rupestris grows as a woody herb, measuring up to 1 metre (3 ft) long. The leaves consist of three elliptic or obovate leaflets, measuring up to 9.5 cm (4 in) long, glabrous above and pubescent below. Inflorescences, in racemes, feature purplish flowers. The fruits are oblanceolate or falcate pods measuring up to 5.2 cm (2 in) long.

== Distribution and habitat ==
Adenodolichos rupestris is native to Tanzania and Zambia. Its habitat is in woodland at altitudes of around 1,200 m (4,000 ft). The species was initially found on rocks at a waterfall.
