= Sciodaphyllum sipapoense =

Conservation status
- Data Deficient (IUCN 3.1)

Scientific classification
- Kingdom: Plantae
- Clade: Tracheophytes
- Clade: Angiosperms
- Clade: Eudicots
- Clade: Asterids
- Order: Apiales
- Family: Araliaceae
- Genus: Sciodaphyllum
- Species: S. sipapoense

Binomial name
- Sciodaphyllum sipapoense (Maguire, Steyerm. & Frodin) Lowry, G.M.Plunkett & M.M.Mora (2019)

Synonyms
- Schefflera sipapoensis Maguire, Steyerm. & Frodin (1984)

Species of flowering plant

Schefflera sipapoensis is a species of flowering plant in the family Araliaceae. It is endemic to Amazonas State of Venezuela.
