= Sciodaphyllum allocotanthum =

Scientific classification
- Kingdom: Plantae
- Clade: Tracheophytes
- Clade: Angiosperms
- Clade: Eudicots
- Clade: Asterids
- Order: Apiales
- Family: Araliaceae
- Genus: Sciodaphyllum
- Species: S. allocotanthum

Binomial name
- Sciodaphyllum allocotanthum (Harms)

Synonyms
- Didymopanax allocotanthus Harms (1931); Schefflera allocotantha (Harms) Frodin (2003 publ. 2004)

Species of flowering plant

Sciodaphyllum allocotanthum is a flowering plant in the family Araliaceae. It is endemic to Bolivia.
