= Sciodaphyllum violaceum =

Scientific classification
- Kingdom: Plantae
- Clade: Tracheophytes
- Clade: Angiosperms
- Clade: Eudicots
- Clade: Asterids
- Order: Apiales
- Family: Araliaceae
- Genus: Sciodaphyllum
- Species: S. violaceum

Binomial name
- Sciodaphyllum violaceum (Cuatrec.) Lowry, G.M.Plunkett & M.M.Mora (2019)

Synonyms
- Schefflera violacea Cuatrec. (1946)

Species of flowering plant

Sciodaphyllum violaceum is a species of flowering plant in the family Araliaceae. It is a scrambling tree endemic to Colombia.
