= Sciodaphyllum seibertii =

Conservation status
- Vulnerable (IUCN 3.1)

Scientific classification
- Kingdom: Plantae
- Clade: Tracheophytes
- Clade: Angiosperms
- Clade: Eudicots
- Clade: Asterids
- Order: Apiales
- Family: Araliaceae
- Genus: Sciodaphyllum
- Species: S. seibertii

Binomial name
- Sciodaphyllum seibertii (A.C.Sm.) Lowry, G.M.Plunkett & M.M.Mora (2019)

Synonyms
- Schefflera seibertii A.C.Sm. (1941)

Species of flowering plant

Sciodaphyllum seibertii is a species of plant in the family Araliaceae. It is a shrub or small tree native to Costa Rica and western Panama.

Sciodaphyllum seibertii is a small shrub or small tree, terrestrial or hemiepiphytic, growing from 1 to 5 meters tall. It flowers in March, April, June, October and November.

It is native to the highlands of Costa Rica and western Panama. The most collections are from the Caribbean slope of Costa Rica. It grows in premontane to montane rain forests and cloud forests, from 1,100 to 1,700, and occasionally as low as 700, meters elevation.
