= Harmsia =

Scientific classification
- Kingdom: Plantae
- Clade: Tracheophytes
- Clade: Angiosperms
- Clade: Eudicots
- Clade: Rosids
- Order: Malvales
- Family: Malvaceae
- Genus: Harmsia; K.Schum.

Synonyms
- Aethiocarpa Vollesen

Genus of flowering plants

Harmsia is a genus of flowering plants belonging to the family Malvaceae.

It is native to Ethiopia, Kenya and Somalia.

The genus name of Harmsia is in honour of Hermann Harms (1870–1942), a German taxonomist and botanist. It was first described and published in H.G.A.Engler & K.A.E.Prantl, Nat. Pflanzenfam., Nachtr. Vo.1 on page 240 in 1897.

Known species, according to Kew:

- Harmsia lepidota (Vollesen) M.Jenny
- Harmsia sidoides K.Schum.
