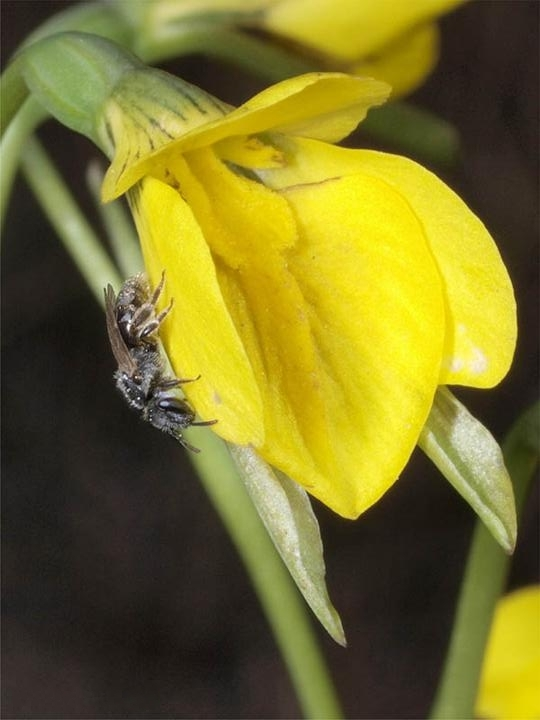
- Diuris basaltica with the bee Lasioglossum cognatum

Conservation status
- Endangered (EPBC Act)

Scientific classification
- Kingdom: Plantae
- Clade: Tracheophytes
- Clade: Angiosperms
- Clade: Monocots
- Order: Asparagales
- Family: Orchidaceae
- Subfamily: Orchidoideae
- Tribe: Diurideae
- Genus: Diuris
- Species: D. basaltica

Binomial name
- Diuris basaltica D.L.Jones

Synonyms
- Diuris basaltica Anon. nom. inval., nom. nud.; Diuris sp. Basaltica (H.Nicholls s.n. MEL 649396) Vic. Herbarium; Diuris sp. aff. chryseopsis (Basalt Plains) p.p.; Diuris sp. aff. chryseopsis 1; Diuris sp. aff. lanceolata (Laverton); Diuris pedunculata auct. non R.Br.: Nicholls, W.H. in Jones, D.L. & Muir, T.B. (ed.) (1969); Diuris pedunculata auct. non R.Br.: Willis, J.H. (1970)

= Diuris basaltica =

Little golden moths

Species of orchid

Diuris basaltica, commonly known as little golden moths, or small golden moths is a species of orchid which is endemic to Victoria. The species has suffered a catastrophic reduction in range and distribution as a result of clearing for agriculture, then by urban expansion until only about four hundred plants remain in the wild.

== Description ==
Diuris basaltica is a tuberous, perennial herb 60–150 mm (2–6 in) tall with between three and seven linear, green leaves, each 30–100 mm (1–4 in) long and 1–2 mm (0.04–0.08 in) wide. There are up to three bright golden yellow to orange-yellow flowers, 15–20 mm (0.6–0.8 in) wide with a few dark streaks. The flowers often do not open widely and lean downwards. The dorsal sepal is 7–12 mm (0.3–0.5 in) long, 6–8 mm (0.2–0.3 in) wide and more or less erect. The lateral sepals curve downwards, 10–16 mm (0.4–0.6 in) long, 1.5–2.5 mm (0.06–0.1 in) wide. The ear-like petals are egg-shaped, 6–10 mm (0.2–0.4 in) long, 3.5–6 mm (0.1–0.2 in) wide with a green stalk, 3–4 mm (0.1–0.2 in) long. The labellum has three lobes, the lateral ones small, wedge-shaped and pimply. The middle lobe is broadly egg-shaped, 7–10 mm (0.3–0.4 in) long, 7–11 mm (0.3–0.4 in) wide with two widely separated ridges near the base and a central ridge extending almost to its tip. Flowering occurs from September to October.

== Taxonomy and naming ==
Diuris basaltica was first formally described in 2006 by David Jones and the description was published in Australian Orchid Review. The specific epithet (basaltica) is a Latin word referring to the soils derived from basalt in which this orchid grows.

== Distribution and habitat ==
Little golden moths grows with kangaroo grass on eastern parts of the basalt plain to the west of Melbourne. The orchid once had a wider distribution on the volcanic plains of south-western Victoria but has suffered a catastrophic decline, firstly due to clearing of its habitat for agriculture and later by urbanisation.

== Conservation ==
Diuris basaltica only survives in three populations, the largest of which includes about 400 plants on private property. Only five plants are conserved in a reserve and another two plants occur in the third population on private land. The main threats to the species are habitat loss, disturbance to or destruction of plants, grazing, weed invasion and altered fire regimes. The species is listed as "endangered" under the Victorian Flora and Fauna Guarantee Act 1988 and the Australian Government Environment Protection and Biodiversity Conservation Act 1999.
