= Adenodolichos acutifoliolatus =

Scientific classification
- Kingdom: Plantae
- Clade: Tracheophytes
- Clade: Angiosperms
- Clade: Eudicots
- Clade: Rosids
- Order: Fabales
- Family: Fabaceae
- Subfamily: Faboideae
- Genus: Adenodolichos
- Species: A. acutifoliolatus

Binomial name
- Adenodolichos acutifoliolatus Verdc.

Species of plant

Adenodolichos acutifoliolatus is a plant in the legume family Fabaceae, native to Tanzania.

== Description ==
Adenodolichos acutifoliolatus grows as a shrubby herb, up to 0.9 metres (3 ft) tall. The leaves consist of up to 3 pairs of lanceolate leaflets, pubescent above and beneath and measuring up to 11.3 cm (4 in) long. Inflorescences have flowers featuring mauve petals.

== Distribution and habitat ==
Adenodolichos acutifoliolatus is endemic to Tanzania. Its habitat is in Brachystegia woodland at altitudes of around 1,100 m (3,600 ft).
