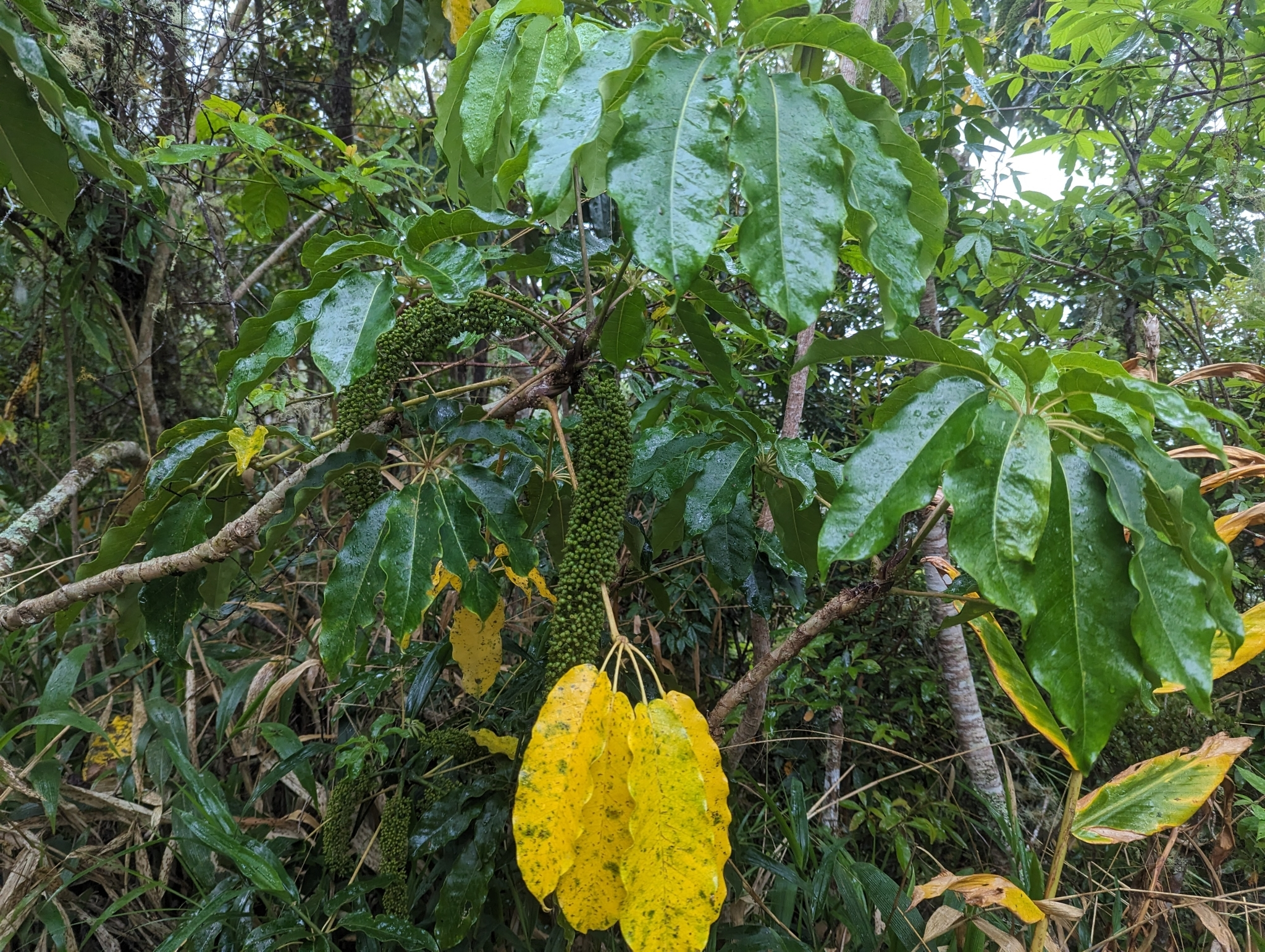

Conservation status
- Endangered (IUCN 2.3)

Scientific classification
- Kingdom: Plantae
- Clade: Tracheophytes
- Clade: Angiosperms
- Clade: Eudicots
- Clade: Asterids
- Order: Apiales
- Family: Araliaceae
- Genus: Sciodaphyllum
- Species: S. brownei

Binomial name
- Sciodaphyllum brownei Spreng. (1824)

Synonyms
- Actinophyllum sciodaphyllum (Sw.) R.C.Schneid. (1909); Aralia sciodaphyllum Sw. (1788); Hedera sciodaphyllum (Sw.) Sw. (1797); Schefflera sciodaphyllum (Sw.) Harms (1894); Schefflera stearnii R.A.Howard & Proctor (1958); Sciodaphyllum praetermissum C.Norman (1926)

= Sciodaphyllum brownei =

Species of flowering plant

Sciodaphyllum brownei is a species of plant in the family Araliaceae. It is endemic to Jamaica. It is threatened by habitat loss.
