= Oreopanax echinops =

Conservation status
- Vulnerable (IUCN 2.3)

Scientific classification
- Kingdom: Plantae
- Clade: Tracheophytes
- Clade: Angiosperms
- Clade: Eudicots
- Clade: Asterids
- Order: Apiales
- Family: Araliaceae
- Genus: Oreopanax
- Species: O. echinops

Binomial name
- Oreopanax echinops (S. & C.) Dun. & Planch.

Species of flowering plant

Oreopanax echinops is a species of plant in the family Araliaceae. It is found in Guatemala, Honduras, and Mexico. It is threatened by habitat loss.
