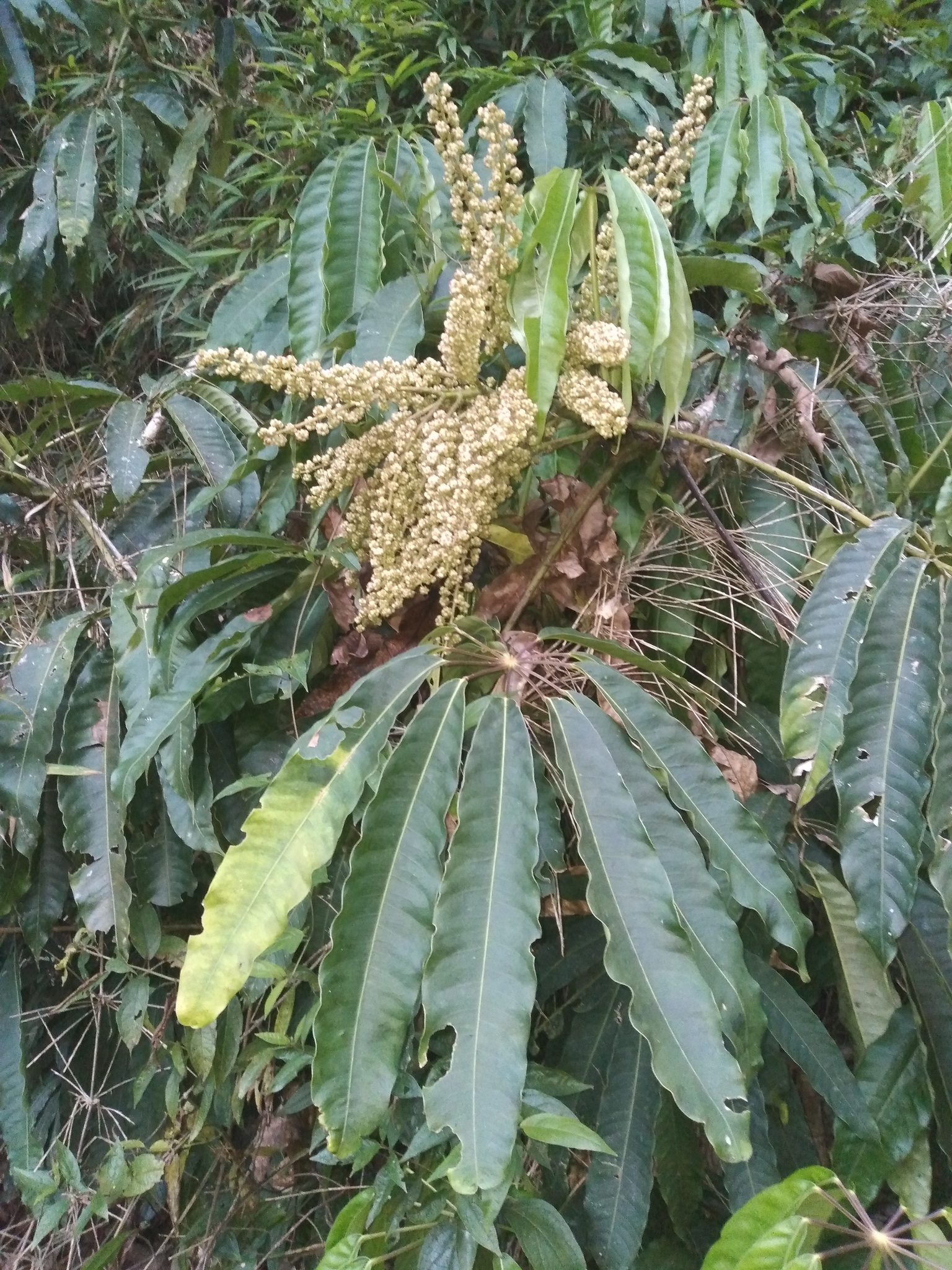
- Sciodaphyllum rivas-martinezii

Scientific classification
- Kingdom: Plantae
- Clade: Embryophytes
- Clade: Tracheophytes
- Clade: Angiosperms
- Clade: Eudicots
- Clade: Asterids
- Order: Apiales
- Family: Araliaceae
- Subfamily: Aralioideae
- Genus: Sciodaphyllum; P.Browne

Species
- See text

Synonyms
- Actinophyllum Ruiz & Pav.; Cotylanthes Calest.; Sciadophyllum Rchb.

= Sciodaphyllum =

Genus of flowering plants

Sciodaphyllum is a genus of flowering plants in the family Araliaceae, native to Central America, the Caribbean, and northern South America. It was resurrected from Schefflera in 2020.

== Species ==
The following species are accepted:

- Sciodaphyllum acuminatum (Pav.) Poir. – Peru
- Sciodaphyllum albocapitatum (M.J.Cannon & Cannon) Lowry, G.M.Plunkett & M.M.Mora – Costa Rica and Panama
- Sciodaphyllum allocotanthum (Harms) Lowry, G.M.Plunkett & M.M.Mora – Bolivia
- Sciodaphyllum angulatum (Pav.) Poir. – Ecuador and Peru
- Sciodaphyllum aquaverense (M.J.Cannon & Cannon) Lowry, G.M.Plunkett & M.M.Mora – Panama
- Sciodaphyllum archeri (Harms) Lowry, G.M.Plunkett & M.M.Mora – Panama and Colombia
- Sciodaphyllum argophyllum (Frodin) Lowry, G.M.Plunkett & M.M.Mora – Venezuela (Amazonas)
- Sciodaphyllum asymmetricum (Frodin) Lowry, G.M.Plunkett & M.M.Mora – Venezuelan and Brazilian Amazon
- Sciodaphyllum attenuatum (Sw.) Lowry, G.M.Plunkett & M.M.Mora – Lesser Antilles
- Sciodaphyllum awa (Ram.-Padilla) Lowry, G.M.Plunkett & M.M.Mora – Colombia (Nariño)
- Sciodaphyllum ayangannense (Maguire, Steyerm. & Frodin) Lowry, G.M.Plunkett & M.M.Mora – Guyana
- Sciodaphyllum bangii (Harms) Lowry, G.M.Plunkett & M.M.Mora – Bolivia
- Sciodaphyllum basiorevolutum Rodrigues-Vaz, G.M.Plunkett & Lowry – Ecuador
- Sciodaphyllum bejucosum (Cuatrec.) Lowry, G.M.Plunkett & M.M.Mora – Colombia
- Sciodaphyllum bifidum (M.J.Cannon & Cannon) Lowry, G.M.Plunkett & M.M.Mora – Panama
- Sciodaphyllum bifurcatum (Idarraga & Jiménez-Mont.) Idarraga & Jiménez-Mont. – Colombia
- Sciodaphyllum blepharidophyllum (Harms) Lowry, G.M.Plunkett & M.M.Mora – Panama, Colombia, and Ecuador
- Sciodaphyllum bogotense (Cuatrec.) Lowry, G.M.Plunkett & M.M.Mora – Colombia
- Sciodaphyllum bonitum (Cuatrec.) Lowry, G.M.Plunkett & M.M.Mora – Colombia
- Sciodaphyllum breviramum (Jiménez-Mont. & Idarraga) Jiménez-Mont. & Idarraga – Colombia
- Sciodaphyllum brownei Spreng. – Jamaica
- Sciodaphyllum buchtienii (Harms) Lowry, G.M.Plunkett & M.M.Mora – Bolivia
- Sciodaphyllum caducum (M.J.Cannon & Cannon) Lowry, G.M.Plunkett & M.M.Mora – Panama
- Sciodaphyllum cajambrense (Cuatrec.) Lowry, G.M.Plunkett & M.M.Mora – Colombia
- Sciodaphyllum calycinum (Cuatrec.) Lowry, G.M.Plunkett & M.M.Mora – Colombia
- Sciodaphyllum calyptricuspidatum (Cuatrec.) Lowry, G.M.Plunkett & M.M.Mora – Colombia
- Sciodaphyllum capitulispicatum (Cuatrec.) Lowry, G.M.Plunkett & M.M.Mora – Colombia and Ecuador
- Sciodaphyllum cartagoense (M.J.Cannon & Cannon) Lowry, G.M.Plunkett & M.M.Mora – Costa Rica
- Sciodaphyllum chachapoyense Rodrigues-Vaz, G.M.Plunkett & Lowry – Peru
- Sciodaphyllum chartaceum A.C.Sm. – Costa Rica and Panama
- Sciodaphyllum chococolum (Frodin) Lowry, G.M.Plunkett & M.M.Mora – Colombia and Ecuador
- Sciodaphyllum cicatricatum (M.J.Cannon & Cannon) Lowry, G.M.Plunkett & M.M.Mora – Panama
- Sciodaphyllum ciliatum (Cuatrec.) Lowry, G.M.Plunkett & M.M.Mora – Colombia
- Sciodaphyllum clausum (Frodin) Lowry, G.M.Plunkett & M.M.Mora – Venezuela (Bolívar)
- Sciodaphyllum coclense (M.J.Cannon & Cannon) Lowry, G.M.Plunkett & M.M.Mora – Panama
- Sciodaphyllum concolor (Frodin) Lowry, G.M.Plunkett & M.M.Mora – Venezuelan and Brazilian Amazon
- Sciodaphyllum connatum (Jiménez-Mont. & Idarraga) Jiménez-Mont. & Idarraga – Colombia
- Sciodaphyllum contractum (Frodin) Lowry, G.M.Plunkett & M.M.Mora – Venezuela (Bolívar)
- Sciodaphyllum cracens (Frodin) Lowry, G.M.Plunkett & M.M.Mora – Venezuela (Bolívar)
- Sciodaphyllum crassilimbum (Frodin) Lowry, G.M.Plunkett & M.M.Mora – Venezuela (Amazonas)
- Sciodaphyllum decagynum (Cuatrec.) Lowry, G.M.Plunkett & M.M.Mora – Colombia
- Sciodaphyllum dielsii (Harms) Lowry, G.M.Plunkett & M.M.Mora – Ecuador and Peru
- Sciodaphyllum diguanum (Cuatrec.) Lowry, G.M.Plunkett & M.M.Mora – Colombia
- Sciodaphyllum digynum (Cuatrec.) Lowry, G.M.Plunkett & M.M.Mora – Colombia
- Sciodaphyllum diplodactylum (Harms) Lowry, G.M.Plunkett & M.M.Mora – southern Colombia, Ecuador, and Peru
- Sciodaphyllum dolichostylum (Harms) Lowry, G.M.Plunkett & M.M.Mora – Ecuador and Peru
- Sciodaphyllum duidae (Steyerm.) Lowry, G.M.Plunkett & M.M.Mora – southern Venezuela and northern Brazil (northwestern Amazonas)
- Sciodaphyllum elachistocephalum (Harms) Lowry, G.M.Plunkett & M.M.Mora – Colombia and Ecuador
- Sciodaphyllum epiphyticum (A.C.Sm.) Lowry, G.M.Plunkett & M.M.Mora – Costa Rica, Panama, Colombia, and Ecuador
- Sciodaphyllum euryphyllum (Harms) Lowry, G.M.Plunkett & M.M.Mora – Peru
- Sciodaphyllum ferrugineum (Willd. ex Schult.) Decne. & Planch. – Colombia and Ecuador
- Sciodaphyllum fragrans (Cuatrec.) Lowry, G.M.Plunkett & M.M.Mora – Colombia
- Sciodaphyllum geniculatum M.M.Mora, Lowry & G.M.Plunkett – Peru
- Sciodaphyllum glabratum (Kunth) Lowry, G.M.Plunkett & M.M.Mora – Trinidad and northern Venezuela
- Sciodaphyllum guanayense (Maguire, Steyerm. & Frodin) Lowry, G.M.Plunkett & M.M.Mora – Venezuela (Amazonas)
- Sciodaphyllum herthae (Harms) Lowry, G.M.Plunkett & M.M.Mora – Ecuador
- Sciodaphyllum herzogii (Harms) Lowry, G.M.Plunkett & M.M.Mora – Bolivia
- Sciodaphyllum heterotrichum Seem. – Colombia
- Sciodaphyllum huilense (Cuatrec.) Lowry, G.M.Plunkett & M.M.Mora – Colombia
- Sciodaphyllum humboldtianum Decne. & Planch. ex Seem. – Colombia
- Sciodaphyllum inambaricum (Harms) Lowry, G.M.Plunkett & M.M.Mora – Peru and western Bolivia
- Sciodaphyllum institum (M.J.Cannon & Cannon) Lowry, G.M.Plunkett & M.M.Mora – Costa Rica
- Sciodaphyllum jauaense (Maguire, Steyerm. & Frodin) Lowry, G.M.Plunkett & M.M.Mora – Venezuela (Bolívar)
- Sciodaphyllum jefense (M.J.Cannon & Cannon) Lowry, G.M.Plunkett & M.M.Mora – Panama
- Sciodaphyllum karstenianum Marchal – Colombia and Venezuela
- Sciodaphyllum kuntzei (Harms) Lowry, G.M.Plunkett & M.M.Mora – Peru and Bolivia
- Sciodaphyllum lancifoliolatum (Frodin) Lowry, G.M.Plunkett & M.M.Mora – Colombia
- Sciodaphyllum lasiogyne (Harms) Lowry, G.M.Plunkett & M.M.Mora – southwestern Colombia and Ecuador
- Sciodaphyllum latiligulatum (M.J.Cannon & Cannon) Lowry, G.M.Plunkett & M.M.Mora – Panama
- Sciodaphyllum lilacinum (Cuatrec.) Lowry, G.M.Plunkett & M.M.Mora – Colombia
- Sciodaphyllum macphersonii (M.J.Cannon & Cannon) Lowry, G.M.Plunkett & M.M.Mora – Panama
- Sciodaphyllum magnifolium (Cuatrec.) Lowry, G.M.Plunkett & M.M.Mora – Colombia and Ecuador
- Sciodaphyllum maguireorum (Frodin) Lowry, G.M.Plunkett & M.M.Mora – Venezuela (Amazonas)
- Sciodaphyllum manus-dei (Cuatrec.) Lowry, G.M.Plunkett & M.M.Mora – Colombia
- Sciodaphyllum marahuacense (Maguire, Steyerm. & Frodin) Lowry, G.M.Plunkett & M.M.Mora – Venezuela (Amazonas)
- Sciodaphyllum marginatum (Cuatrec.) Lowry, G.M.Plunkett & M.M.Mora – Colombia
- Sciodaphyllum mathewsii Seem. – Peru
- Sciodaphyllum merinoi D.A.Neill, G.M.Plunkett, Lowry & M.M.Mora – Ecuador
- Sciodaphyllum meiurophyllum (Frodin) Lowry, G.M.Plunkett & M.M.Mora – Venezuela (Amazonas)
- Sciodaphyllum minutiflorum (Harms) Lowry, G.M.Plunkett & M.M.Mora – Colombia, Ecuador, and Peru
- Sciodaphyllum montanum Idarraga, Jiménez-Mont. & Lowry – Colombia,
- Sciodaphyllum monzonense (Harms) Lowry, G.M.Plunkett & M.M.Mora – Peru
- Sciodaphyllum munchiquense (Ram.-Padilla) Lowry, G.M.Plunkett & M.M.Mora – Colombia (Valle del Cauca)
- Sciodaphyllum nebularum (Harms) Lowry, G.M.Plunkett & M.M.Mora – Bolivia
- Sciodaphyllum nephelophilum (Harms) Lowry, G.M.Plunkett & M.M.Mora – Bolivia
- Sciodaphyllum nicaraguense Standl. – Nicaragua and Costa Rica
- Sciodaphyllum octostylum (M.J.Cannon & Cannon) Lowry, G.M.Plunkett & M.M.Mora – Panama
- Sciodaphyllum oxapampense G.M.Plunkett, Lowry & M.M.Mora – Peru
- Sciodaphyllum panamense (M.J.Cannon & Cannon) Lowry, G.M.Plunkett & M.M.Mora – Panama
- Sciodaphyllum paniculitomentosum (Cuatrec.) Lowry, G.M.Plunkett & M.M.Mora – Colombia
- Sciodaphyllum pardoanum (Harms) Lowry, G.M.Plunkett & M.M.Mora – Peru
- Sciodaphyllum paruanum (Frodin) Lowry, G.M.Plunkett & M.M.Mora – southern Venezuela
- Sciodaphyllum patulum Rusby – southeastern Ecuador, Peru, and northwestern Bolivia
- Sciodaphyllum pedicellatum (Pav.) Poir. – Ecuador and Peru
- Sciodaphyllum pedicelligerum (Maguire, Steyerm. & Frodin) Lowry, G.M.Plunkett & M.M.Mora – Venezuela (Amazonas)
- Sciodaphyllum pentadactylum (Cuatrec.) Lowry, G.M.Plunkett & M.M.Mora – Colombia and Ecuador
- Sciodaphyllum pentandrum (Pav.) Poir. – Ecuador, Peru, and northwestern Bolivia
- Sciodaphyllum peruvianum (Aspl.) Lowry, G.M.Plunkett & M.M.Mora – Peru
- Sciodaphyllum pittieri (Marchal ex T.Durand & Pittier) Lowry, G.M.Plunkett & M.M.Mora – Costa Rica and Panama
- Sciodaphyllum planchonianum Marchal – Ecuador
- Sciodaphyllum purocafeanum G.M.Plunkett, M.M.Mora, D.A.Neill & Lowry – Ecuador
- Sciodaphyllum pygmaeum Jiménez-Mont. & Idarraga – Colombia
- Sciodaphyllum quinduense (Kunth) DC. – Colombia
- Sciodaphyllum quinquestylorum (Steyerm.) Lowry, G.M.Plunkett & M.M.Mora – Venezuela (Bolívar) and Guyana
- Sciodaphyllum ramosissimum (Cuatrec.) Lowry, G.M.Plunkett & M.M.Mora – Colombia
- Sciodaphyllum recaldeorum Lowry, G.M.Plunkett, M.M.Mora & D.A.Neill – Ecuador
- Sciodaphyllum reticulatum (Gleason) Lowry, G.M.Plunkett & M.M.Mora – Venezuela and Guyana
- Sciodaphyllum rivas-martinezii A.Fuentes & Cayola – Bolivia
- Sciodaphyllum robustum A.C.Sm. – Costa Rica and Panama
- Sciodaphyllum rodolfoi Lowry, G.M.Plunkett & M.M.Mora – Peru
- Sciodaphyllum rubiginosum (Marchal) Lowry, G.M.Plunkett & M.M.Mora – northwestern Venezuela
- Sciodaphyllum rufilanceolatum Rodrigues-Vaz, G.M.Plunkett & Lowry – Ecuador
- Sciodaphyllum sachamatense (Cuatrec.) Lowry, G.M.Plunkett & M.M.Mora – Colombia
- Sciodaphyllum samarianum (Cuatrec.) Lowry, G.M.Plunkett & M.M.Mora – Colombia
- Sciodaphyllum sandianum (Harms) Lowry, G.M.Plunkett & M.M.Mora – Peru
- Sciodaphyllum sapoense (M.J.Cannon & Cannon) Lowry, G.M.Plunkett & M.M.Mora – Panama
- Sciodaphyllum sararense (Cuatrec.) Lowry, G.M.Plunkett & M.M.Mora – Colombia
- Sciodaphyllum seibertii (A.C.Sm.) Lowry, G.M.Plunkett & M.M.Mora – Costa Rica and Panama
- Sciodaphyllum silvaticum (Cuatrec.) Lowry, G.M.Plunkett & M.M.Mora – Colombia
- Sciodaphyllum sipapoense (Maguire, Steyerm. & Frodin) Lowry, G.M.Plunkett & M.M.Mora – Venezuela (Amazonas)
- Sciodaphyllum sodiroi (Harms) Lowry, G.M.Plunkett & M.M.Mora – Ecuador
- Sciodaphyllum sonsonense Jiménez-Mont. – Colombia
- Sciodaphyllum sphaerocoma Benth. – Panama, Colombia, and Ecuador
- Sciodaphyllum sprucei Seem. – Colombia, Ecuador, and Peru
- Sciodaphyllum steyermarkii (Frodin) Lowry, G.M.Plunkett & M.M.Mora – Venezuela (Bolívar)
- Sciodaphyllum systylum Donn.Sm. – Costa Rica, Panama, and western Colombia
- Sciodaphyllum tamanum (Steyerm.) Lowry, G.M.Plunkett & M.M.Mora – Venezuela (Táchira)
- Sciodaphyllum ternatum (Cuatrec.) Lowry, G.M.Plunkett & M.M.Mora – Colombia
- Sciodaphyllum tipuanicum (Harms) Lowry, G.M.Plunkett & M.M.Mora – Bolivia
- Sciodaphyllum tremuloideum (Maguire, Steyerm. & Frodin) Lowry, G.M.Plunkett & M.M.Mora – Venezuela (Amazonas) and Brazil (Amazonas)
- Sciodaphyllum trianae Planch. & Linden ex Marchal – Colombia
- Sciodaphyllum trollii (Harms) Lowry, G.M.Plunkett & M.M.Mora – Bolivia
- Sciodaphyllum troyanum Urb. – Jamaica
- Sciodaphyllum undulatum Jiménez-Mont., Idarraga & Lowry – Colombia
- Sciodaphyllum urbanianum (Marchal ex Urb.) Lowry, G.M.Plunkett & M.M.Mora – northern Martinique
- Sciodaphyllum vanderwerffii (Dorr & Stergios) Lowry, G.M.Plunkett & M.M.Mora – Venezuela
- Sciodaphyllum vasquezianum (Harms) Lowry, G.M.Plunkett & M.M.Mora – Colombia
- Sciodaphyllum velutinum (Cuatrec.) Lowry, G.M.Plunkett & M.M.Mora – Colombia
- Sciodaphyllum venezuelense Lowry, G.M.Plunkett & M.M.Mora – Venezuela
- Sciodaphyllum viguierianum (Harms) Lowry, G.M.Plunkett & M.M.Mora – Peru
- Sciodaphyllum violaceum (Cuatrec.) Lowry, G.M.Plunkett & M.M.Mora – Colombia
- Sciodaphyllum weberbaueri (Harms) Lowry, G.M.Plunkett & M.M.Mora – Peru
- Sciodaphyllum whitefoordiae (M.J.Cannon & Cannon) Lowry, G.M.Plunkett & M.M.Mora – Panama and northwestern Colombia
- Sciodaphyllum yurumanguine (Cuatrec.) Lowry, G.M.Plunkett & M.M.Mora – Colombia
- Sciodaphyllum zarucchii M.M.Mora, Lowry, Idarraga, Jiménez-Mont. & G.M.Plunkett – Colombia
- Sciodaphyllum zunacense M.M.Mora, Lowry, G.M.Plunkett & D.A.Neill – Ecuador
