= Oreopanax peltatus =

Conservation status
- Vulnerable (IUCN 2.3)

Scientific classification
- Kingdom: Plantae
- Clade: Tracheophytes
- Clade: Angiosperms
- Clade: Eudicots
- Clade: Asterids
- Order: Apiales
- Family: Araliaceae
- Genus: Oreopanax
- Species: O. peltatus

Binomial name
- Oreopanax peltatus Linden ex Riegel

Species of tree

Oreopanax peltatus is a species of plant in the family Araliaceae. It is found in Guatemala and Mexico. It is threatened by habitat loss.
