= Oreopanax lempiranus =

Conservation status
- Critically Endangered (IUCN 2.3)

Scientific classification
- Kingdom: Plantae
- Clade: Tracheophytes
- Clade: Angiosperms
- Clade: Eudicots
- Clade: Asterids
- Order: Apiales
- Family: Araliaceae
- Genus: Oreopanax
- Species: O. lempiranus

Binomial name
- Oreopanax lempiranus Hazlett

Species of flowering plant

Oreopanax lempiranus is a species of plant in the family Araliaceae. It is endemic to the Parque Nacional Montaña de Celaque in the occidente of Honduras. The plant is known in Spanish as the "arbol del oro del cacique lempira" for the golden colored trichomes on the leaf and the significance of the native chief Lempira in the region.

== Habitat and distribution ==
The plant grows between 2,500 masl and 2,800 masl in the Celaque mountains. The estimated population is between 2,000 and 2,500 individuals in the nuclear zone of the park.
