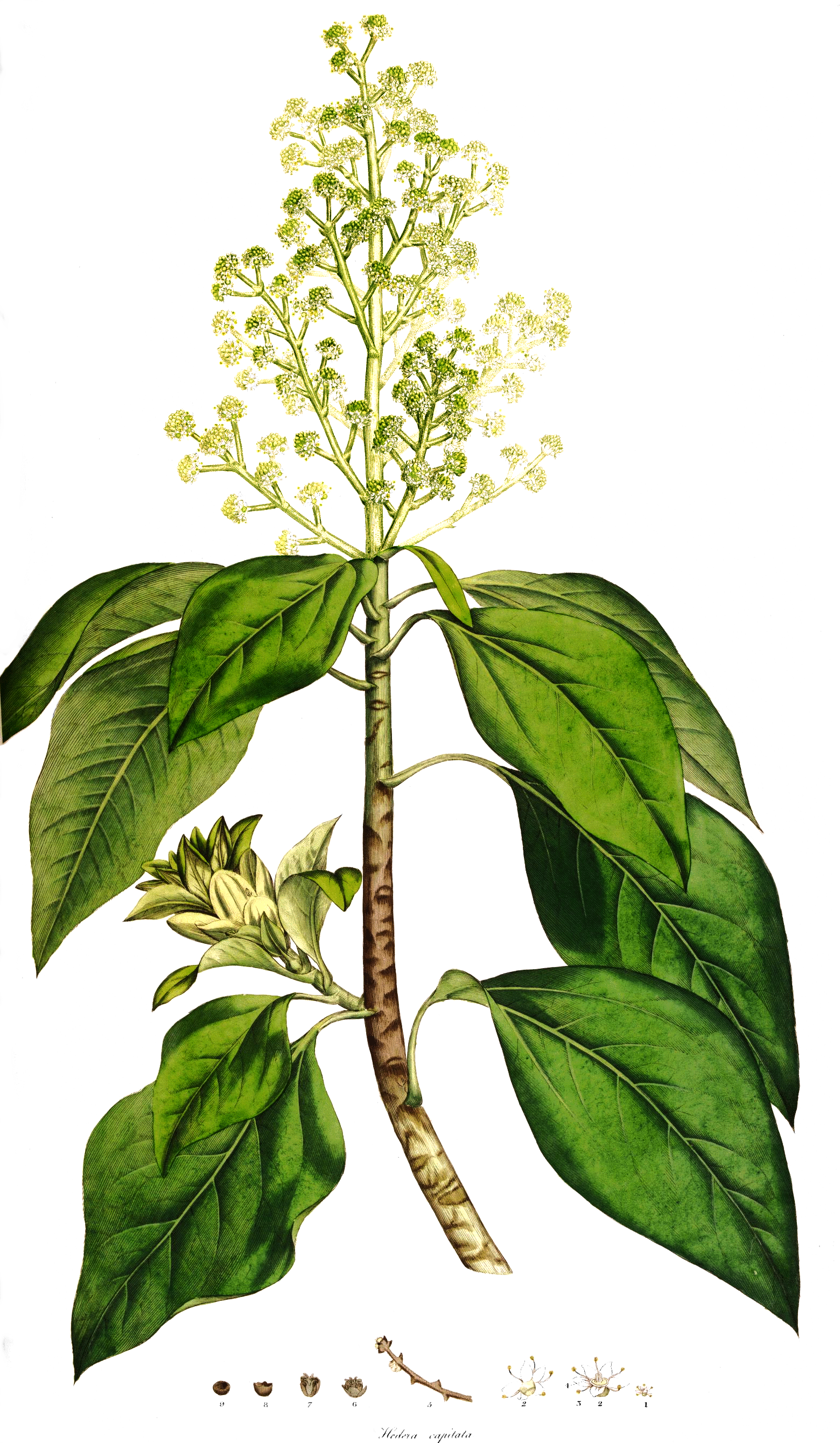
- Oreopanax capitatus

Scientific classification
- Kingdom: Plantae
- Clade: Tracheophytes
- Clade: Angiosperms
- Clade: Eudicots
- Clade: Asterids
- Order: Apiales
- Family: Araliaceae
- Subfamily: Aralioideae
- Genus: Oreopanax; Decne. & Planch.

Species
- Ca. 85, see text

Synonyms
- Monopanax Regel

= Oreopanax =

Genus of flowering plants

Oreopanax is a genus of shrubs and trees in the family Araliaceae, comprising circa 85 species native to the Americas.

== Distribution ==
Oreopanax species' range extends from Mexico and the Antilles to Argentina and Brazil, with most species occurring above 500 meters above sea level.

== Species ==
- Oreopanax acerifolius
- Oreopanax albanensis
- Oreopanax allocophyllus
- Oreopanax anchicayanus
- Oreopanax andreanus
- Oreopanax angularis
- Oreopanax anomalus
- Oreopanax apurimacensis
- Oreopanax aquifolius
- Oreopanax arcanus
- Oreopanax argentatus
- Oreopanax artocarpoides
- Oreopanax atopanthus
- Oreopanax avicenniifolius
- Oreopanax bogotensis
- Oreopanax boliviensis
- Oreopanax brachystachyus
- Oreopanax brunneus
- Oreopanax bullosus
- Oreopanax candamoanus
- Oreopanax capitatus
- Oreopanax catalpifolius
- Oreopanax cecropifolius
- Oreopanax cheirophyllus
- Oreopanax cissoides
- Oreopanax compactus
- Oreopanax confusus
- Oreopanax corazonensis
- Oreopanax coriaceus
- Oreopanax costaricensis
- Oreopanax crassinervius
- Oreopanax crataegodorus
- Oreopanax cumanensis
- Oreopanax cuspidatus
- Oreopanax cyclophyllus
- Oreopanax dactylifolius
- Oreopanax deinocephalus
- Oreopanax diguensis
- Oreopanax discolor
- Oreopanax divulsus
- Oreopanax donnell-smithii
- Oreopanax duquei
- Oreopanax dussii
- Oreopanax echinops
- Oreopanax ecuadorensis
- Oreopanax ellsworthii
- Oreopanax epificus
- Oreopanax epremesnilianus
- Oreopanax eriocephalus
- Oreopanax farallonensis
- Oreopanax flaccidus
- Oreopanax fontqueranus
- Oreopanax fulvus
- Oreopanax gargantae
- Oreopanax geminatus
- Oreopanax glabrifolius
- Oreopanax gnaphalocephalus
- Oreopanax grandifolius
- Oreopanax grosseserratus
- Oreopanax guatemalensis
- Oreopanax hederaceus
- Oreopanax hedraeostrobilus
- Oreopanax herzogii
- Oreopanax humboldtianus
- Oreopanax hypargyreus
- Oreopanax ilicifolius
- Oreopanax impolitus
- Oreopanax incisus
- Oreopanax integrifolius
- Oreopanax iodophyllus
- Oreopanax ischnolobus
- Oreopanax jatrophifolius
- Oreopanax jelskii
- Oreopanax killipii
- Oreopanax klugii
- Oreopanax kuntzei
- Oreopanax lawrancei
- Oreopanax lechleri
- Oreopanax lehmannii
- Oreopanax lempiranus
- Oreopanax liebmannii
- Oreopanax lindenii
- Oreopanax macleanii
- Oreopanax macrocephalus
- Oreopanax mathewsii
- Oreopanax membranaceus
- Oreopanax microflorus
- Oreopanax moritzii
- Oreopanax mutisianus
- Oreopanax nicaraguensis
- Oreopanax niger
- Oreopanax nubigenus
- Oreopanax nymphaeifolius
- Oreopanax obscurus
- Oreopanax obtusilobus
- Oreopanax oerstedianus
- Oreopanax oroyanus
- Oreopanax pachycephalus
- Oreopanax palamophyllus
- Oreopanax pallidus
- Oreopanax pariahuancae
- Oreopanax parviflorus
- Oreopanax pavonii
- Oreopanax peltatus
- Oreopanax pentlandianus
- Oreopanax pes-ursi
- Oreopanax platanifolius
- Oreopanax platyphyllus
- Oreopanax polycephalus
- Oreopanax pycnocarpus
- Oreopanax raimondii
- Oreopanax ramosissimus
- Oreopanax reticulatus
- Oreopanax ripicolus
- Oreopanax robustus
- Oreopanax rosei
- Oreopanax ruizanus
- Oreopanax ruizii
- Oreopanax rusbyi
- Oreopanax salvinii
- Oreopanax sanderianus
- Oreopanax sandianus
- Oreopanax santanderianus
- Oreopanax schultzei
- Oreopanax sectifolius
- Oreopanax seemannianus
- Oreopanax sessiliflorus
- Oreopanax simplicifolius
- Oreopanax spathulatus
- Oreopanax standleyi
- Oreopanax steinbachianus
- Oreopanax stenodactylus
- Oreopanax stenophyllus
- Oreopanax steyermarkii
- Oreopanax striatus
- Oreopanax sucrensis
- Oreopanax superoerstedianus
- Oreopanax thaumasiophyllus
- Oreopanax tolimanus
- Oreopanax trianae
- Oreopanax trifidus
- Oreopanax trollii
- Oreopanax turbacensis
- Oreopanax urubambanus
- Oreopanax velutinus
- Oreopanax venezuelensis
- Oreopanax vestitus
- Oreopanax weberbaueri
- Oreopanax williamsii
- Oreopanax xalapensis
