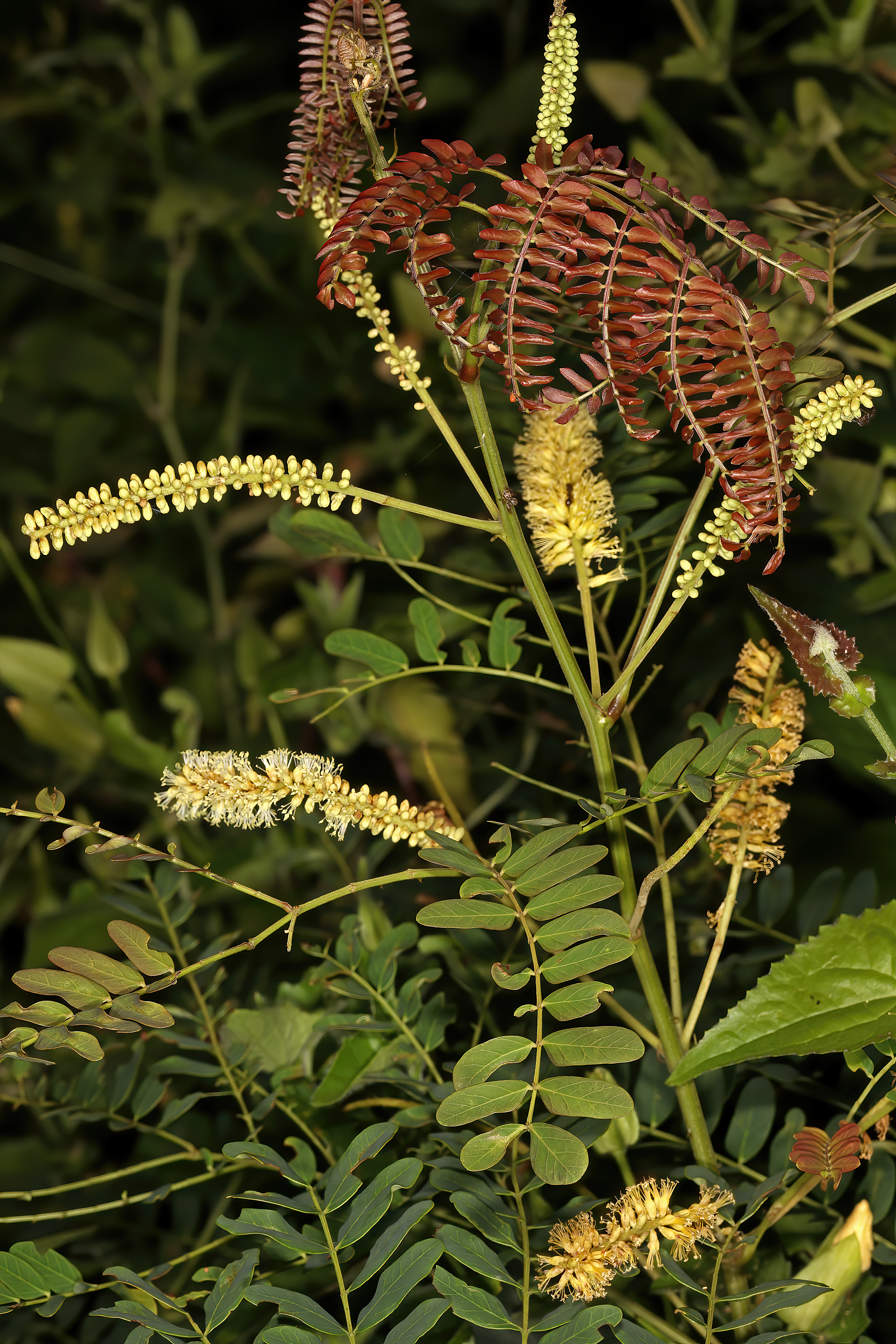
- Adenopodia spicata

Scientific classification
- Kingdom: Plantae
- Clade: Tracheophytes
- Clade: Angiosperms
- Clade: Eudicots
- Clade: Rosids
- Order: Fabales
- Family: Fabaceae
- Subfamily: Caesalpinioideae
- Clade: Mimosoid clade
- Genus: Adenopodia; C.Presl 1851

Synonyms
- Entada subgenus Acanthentada Brenan (1966); Pseudoentada Britton & Rose (1928)

= Adenopodia =

Genus of legumes

Adenopodia is a genus of legume in the family Fabaceae, that occurs in the northern Neotropics and Africa. They may grow as lianas, shrubs or trees. The petioles have a distinct gland above their base, hence the Greek name which is a combination of "gland-" and "foot".

== Species ==
It contains the following species:

- Adenopodia gymnantha Brenan – western Mexico
- Adenopodia oaxacana M.Sousa – southern Mexico
- Adenopodia patens (Hook. & Arn.) Brenan – western Mexico & central America
- Adenopodia rotundifolia (Harms) Brenan – east Africa
- Adenopodia scelerata (A.Chev.) Brenan – west & central Africa
- Adenopodia schlechteri (Harms) Brenan – southeastern Africa
- Adenopodia spicata (E.Mey.) C.Presl – southern Africa

== See also ==
- Piptadenia
