= Harmsiodoxa =

Scientific classification
- Kingdom: Plantae
- Clade: Tracheophytes
- Clade: Angiosperms
- Clade: Eudicots
- Clade: Rosids
- Order: Brassicales
- Family: Brassicaceae
- Genus: Harmsiodoxa; O.E.Schulz

Genus of flowering plants

Harmsiodoxa is a genus of flowering plants belonging to the family Brassicaceae.

It is native to Australia.

The genus name of Harmsiodoxa is in honour of Hermann Harms (1870–1942), a German taxonomist and botanist. It was first described and published in H.G.A.Engler (ed.), Das Pflanzenreich, IV, 105(86) on page 260 in 1924.

Known species, according to Kew:

- Harmsiodoxa blennodioides (F.Muell.) O.E.Schulz
- Harmsiodoxa brevipes O.E.Schulz
- Harmsiodoxa puberula E.A.Shaw
