= António Rocha da Torre =

Portuguese botanist (1904–1995)

- Born: 1904; Viana do Castelo, Portugal
- Died: 1995; Santo Tirso, Portugal
- Occupations: botanist, academic

António Rocha da Torre (1904–1995) was a Portuguese botanist and taxonomist.

He carried out botanical expeditions to Mozambique, and to Portugal; over four decades, individually and in collaboration, the collection of more than 18,000 botanical specimens. His contributions were essential for the inventory of plant species, the characterization of the types of vegetation and the progress of taxonomic knowledge of the flora of Mozambique. He sometimes collaborated with Jean Olive Dorothy Hillcoat of the Natural History Museum in London in collecting and describing specimens.

== Selected publications ==
- Antonio r. Torre, A.E. Gonçalves. 1976. Cassipourea fanshawei, sp. Nov. (Rhizophoraceae). Garcia de Orta, Ser. Bot. 3 (1): 49
- Susana Saraiva, et al.. 2012. António Rocha da Torre and the Flora of Mozambique. Proceedings of the International Congress of Tropical Knowledge in Mozambique: History, Memory and Science - IICT – JBT/Tropical Botanical Garden. Lisbon, 24–26 October 2012
- "Memórias de África e do Oriente | Catálogo - Pesquisa no Autor - por [torre, antonio rocha da]". memoria-africa.ua.pt.
- "Memórias de África e do Oriente | Catálogo - Pesquisa no Autor - por [torre, a. r.]". memoria-africa.ua.pt.

=== Book chapters ===
- A.E. Gonçalves, Antonio r. Torre. 1979. Flora de Moçambique. 67. Rhizophoraceae. Instituto de Investigação Científica Tropical (Institute for Tropical Scientific Research), Lisbon. 24 pp.
- Antonio r. Torre, A.E. Gonçalves. 1978. Rhizophoraceae. En: E. Launert, Flora Zambesiaca 4, 81-99, 5 est. Royal Botanic Gardens, Kew

== Honors ==
=== Eponymous species ===
- (Asteraceae) Crassocephalum torreanum Lisowski
- (Solanaceae) Solanum torreanum A.E.Gonç.
