= Élie Marchal =

Belgian botanist and mycologist (1839–1923)

Élie Marchal (1 March 1839, in Wasigny – 19 February 1923, in Gembloux) was a Belgian botanist and mycologist.

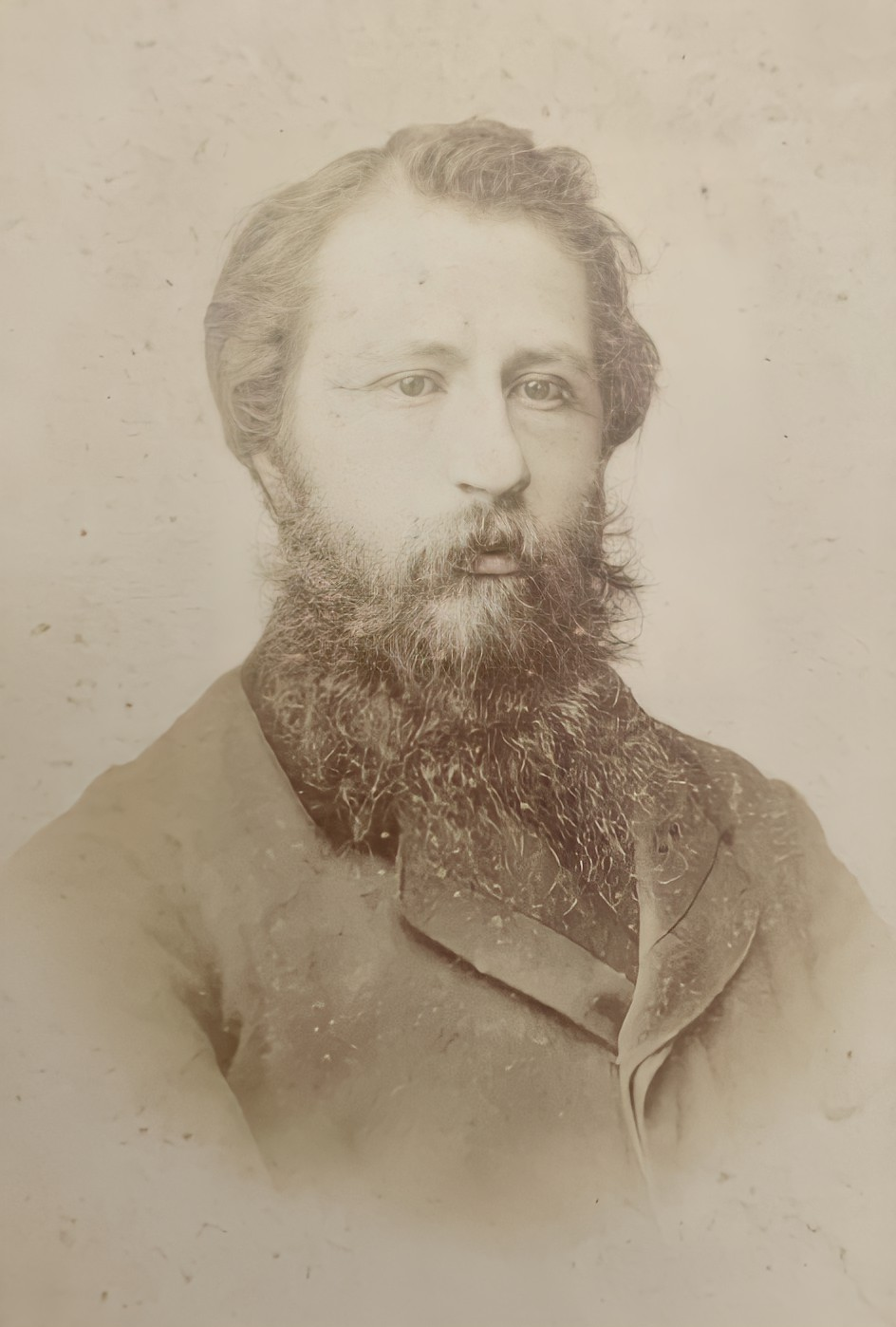
Elie Marchal in 1873

From 1861 to 1871, he was a middle-school teacher in the communities of Virton, Ath, Visé and Maeseyck. From 1871 to 1879 he was associated with research done at the Jardin botanique des Bruxelles. Additionally, from 1872 until 1899, he worked as a lecturer at various horticultural and teacher schools. In 1899 he retired to Gembloux, where he worked closely with his son, botanist Émile Marchal (1871–1954).

He was the binomial author of numerous species within the flowering plant family Araliaceae. The mycological genera Marchaliella and Marchalia are named in his honor, the latter genus being circumscribed by Pier Andrea Saccardo.

== Selected works ==
- Révision des Hédéracées américaines : description de dix-huit espèces nouvelles et d'un genre inédit, 1879 - Revision of American Hederaceae, description of 18 new species and a unique genus.
- Notice sur les hédéracées récoltées : dans la Nouvelle-Grenade, l'Équateur et le Pérou, 1880 - Notice involving Hederaceae collected in New Granada, Ecuador and Peru.
- Recherches expérimentales sur la sexualité des spores chez les mousses dioïques, 1906 - Experimental research on spore sexuality in dioecious mosses (with Émile Marchal).

He edited two exsiccatae, namely Les Glumacées de Belgique (1869–1871) with C. A. Cogniaux and Cryptogames de Belgique (1882).
