= Hermann Harms =

German taxonomist and botanist (1870–1942)

- Born: Hermann Harms; 16 July 1870
- Died: 27 November 1942 (aged 72)
- Scientific career
- Fields: Botany
- Author abbrev. (botany): Harms

Hermann August Theodor Harms (16 July 1870 – 27 November 1942) was a German taxonomist and botanist. Harms was born in Berlin. He worked as a botanist at the Botanical Museum in Berlin. He was a member of the Prussian Academy of Sciences. He died in Berlin, aged 72. The standard author abbreviation Harms is used to indicate this person as the author when citing a botanical name.

He was longtime editor of Adolf Engler's "Das Pflanzenreich", and was the author of several chapters on various plant families in Engler and Prantl's "Die Natürlichen Pflanzenfamilien", including the chapters on Bromeliaceae (1930) and Nepenthaceae (1936). In the latter he revised the pitcher plant genus Nepenthes, dividing it into three subgenera: Anurosperma, Eunepenthes and Mesonepenthes (see Taxonomy of Nepenthes). Furthermore, he was interested in the genus Passiflora.

The plant genera Harmsia, Harmsiella (now Moluccella), Harmsiodoxa and Harmsiopanax are named in his honour. The species Pectinopitys harmsiana is also named after him.

== Publications ==
- Genera siphonogamarum ad systematic Englerianum conscripta. Leipzig: G. Engelmann, 1900–1907, with Karl Wilhelm von Dalla Torre (1850-1928).
- Cucurbitaceae Cucurbiteae-Cucumerinae. Leipzig: Engelmann, 1924 (reprinted Wiley 1966), with Alfred Cogniaux (1841-1916).
