= Costa Rican páramo =

Natural region of Costa Rica and Panama

Costa Rican páramo Talamancan páramo Páramo Costarricense /Páramo de Talamanca
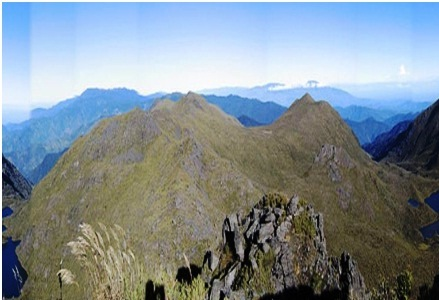
- Landscape of some of the highest peaks of the Talamanca Range with Cerro Chirripó

Ecology
- Realm: Neotropical
- Biome: montane grasslands and shrublands
- Borders: Talamancan montane forests

Geography
- Area: 31 km^{2} (12 mi^{2})
- Countries: Costa Rica; Panama

Conservation
- Protected: 100%

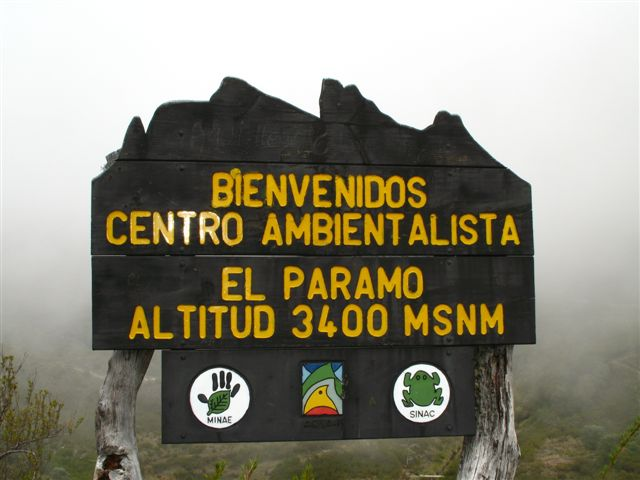

The Costa Rican páramo, also known as the Talamanca páramo, is a natural region of montane grassland and shrubland of Costa Rica and western Panama.

== Setting ==
The Costa Rican páramo includes several enclaves on the highest peaks of the Cordillera de Talamanca in eastern Costa Rica and western Panama, with a total area of 31 km^{2}. The páramo is found above 3000–3100 meters elevation on the summits of Cerro de la Muerte, Cerro Chirripó, and Cerro Kamuk in Costa Rica, Cerro Echandi on the Costa Rica-Panama border, and Cerro Fábrega and Cerro Itamut in Panama.

It is surrounded at lower elevations by the Talamancan montane forests. The World Wide Fund for Nature includes the Costa Rican páramo within the montane forests ecoregion, although the páramo has a distinct flora with affinities to the páramo of the Northern Andes.

== Flora ==
The Costa Rican páramo can be divided into two zones. The subpáramo is a dwarf forest, dominated by the dwarf bamboo Chusquea subtessellata, together with short shrubs.

The páramo proper lies above the subpáramo, and is dominated by grasses, rushes, herbs, and low shrubs of the families Gramineae, Asteraceae, Cyperaceae, Rosaceae, and Ericaceae.

The páramo is home to 416 flowering plant species, from 216 genera and 72 families. Fifty species are endemic to the Talamancan páramos. Asteraceae is the most species-rich, with 73 species, including five endemic genera – Iltisia, Jessea, Laestadia, Talamancalia, and Westoniella. Twenty species are restricted to the highest páramo elevations (3,500 to 3,819 m) – Azorella biloba, Castilleja quirosii, Draba jorullensis, Lewisia megarhiza, Lysipomia acaulis, Poa chirripoensis, Ranunculus crassirostratus, Senecio kuhbieri, Stevia westonii, Uncinia koyamae, Westoniella chirripoensis, and Westoniella eriocephala.

== Fauna ==
32 species of mammals inhabit the páramo, including shrews (Cryptotis), rabbits (Sylvilagus), ocelot (Leopardus pardalis), margay (Leopardus wiedii), puma (Puma concolor ssp. costaricensis), and Baird's tapir (Tapirus bairdii).

70 bird species have been observed in the páramo. Twelve are considered true páramo residents, who live year-round in the páramo – the red-tailed hawk (Buteo jamaicensis), black-cheeked warbler (Basileuterus melanogenys), wrenthrush (Zeledonia coronata), flame-throated warbler (Oreothlypis gutturalis), timberline wren (Thryorchilus browni), volcano hummingbird (Selasphorus flammula), black-billed nightingale-thrush (Catharus gracilirostris), sooty thrush (Turdus nigrescens), sooty-capped bush tanager (Chlorospingus pileatus), volcano junco (Junco vulcani), large-footed finch (Pezopetes capitalis), and rufous-collared sparrow (Zonotrichia capensis). Another 34 species are regular visitors to the sub-páramo from the adjacent cloud forests; the remainder are occasional visitors.

The páramo is home to one amphibian, the mushroom-tongue salamander (Bolitoglossa pesrubra), and two reptiles, the montane alligator lizard (Mesaspis monticola) and green spiny lizard (Sceloporus malachiticus). Another 16 species of reptiles and amphibians inhabit the sub-páramo dwarf forests.

71 insect species are recorded in the páramo, with Lepidoptera as the order with the most species. The most abundant species are the moth Gonodonta pyrgo, the leafhopper Hortensia similis, and the bumblebee Bombus ephippiatus.

== Protected areas ==
All of the Costa Rican páramo is in protected areas. Chirripó National Park, established in 1975, protects Costa Rica's largest area of páramo on Cerro Chirripó (3,819 m) and surrounding peaks. La Amistad International Park, established in 1982, protects the páramo on peaks extending southeastward from Cerro Chirripó, including as Eli, Dúrika, and Kamuk in Costa Rica and Fábrega, Itamut, and Echandi in Panama. Tapantí–Macizo Cerro de la Muerte National Park protects the páramos of Buenavista massif. Irazú and Turrialba national parks protect the páramo on the Irazú and Turrialba volcanoes in the Cordillera Central.
