= Talamancan montane forests =

Ecoregion in Costa Rica and Panama

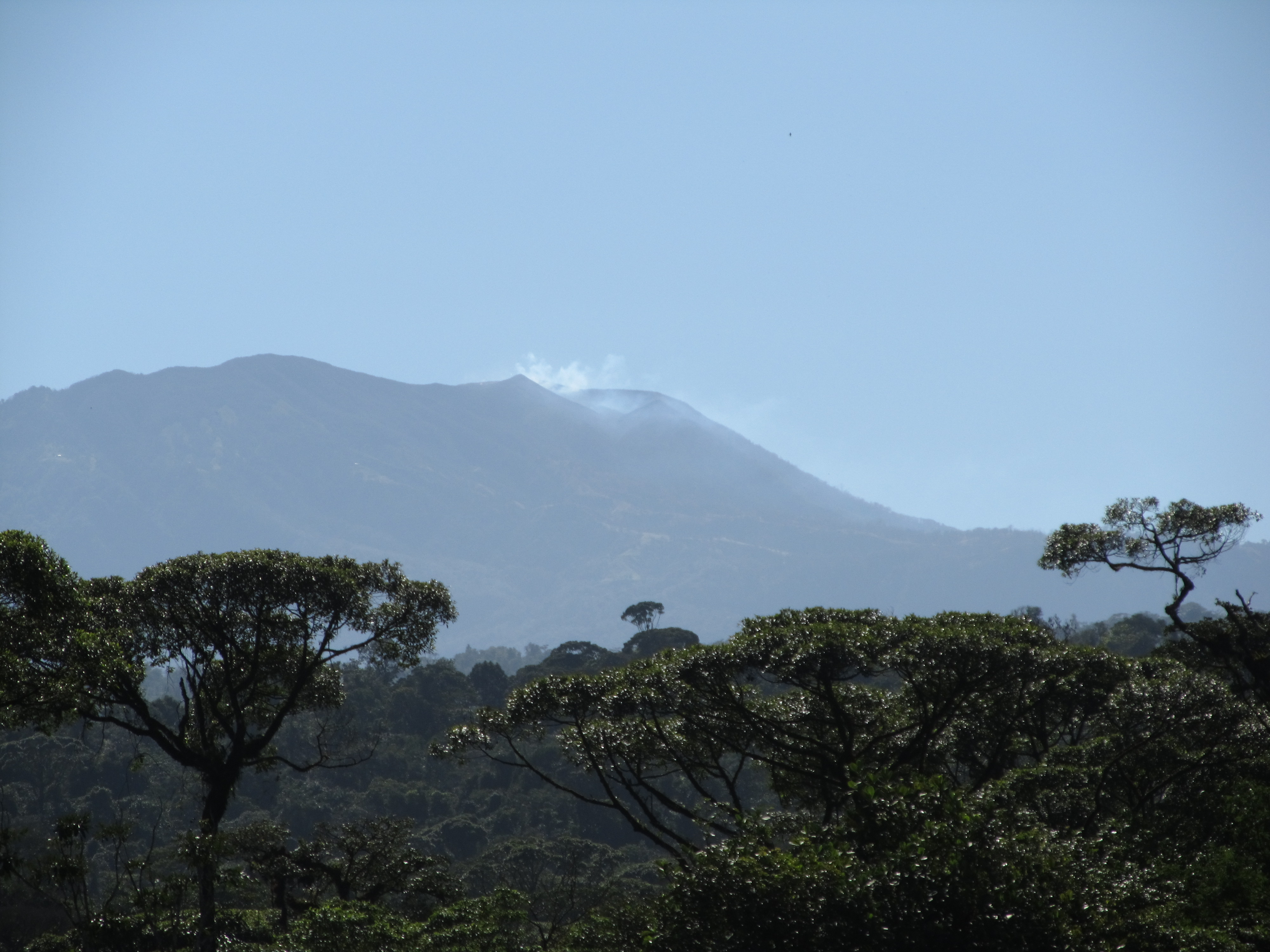
- Forests around the Turrialba Volcano in Costa Rica

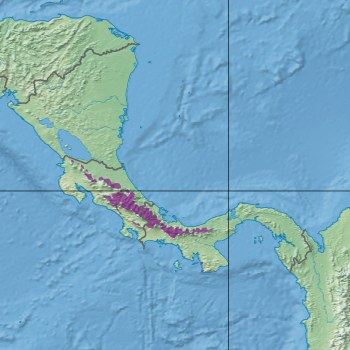
- Ecoregion territory (purple)

Ecology
- Realm: Neotropical
- Biome: tropical and subtropical moist broadleaf forests
- Borders: Costa Rican seasonal moist forests; Isthmian–Atlantic moist forests, Isthmian–Pacific moist forests

Geography
- Area: 16,300 km^{2} (6,300 sq mi)
- Countries: Costa Rica; Panama

Conservation
- Conservation status: Relatively stable/intact
- Protected: 62%%

The Talamancan montane forests ecoregion, in the tropical moist broadleaf forest biome, are in montane Costa Rica and western Panama in Central America.

== Setting ==
The Talamancan montane forests cover a discontinuous area of 16,300 square kilometers (6,300 sq mi) in Cordilleran mountains, including the Cordillera de Guanacaste, Cordillera de Tilarán, Cordillera Central, and Cordillera de Talamanca, from northwestern Costa Rica to western Panama, with outliers on Cerro Hoya on Panama's Azuero Peninsula. The montane forests lie above 750 to 1500 meters elevation, up to approximately 3000 meters elevation, where they transition to the grasslands and shrublands of the Costa Rican páramo on the highest peaks.

The montane forests are surrounded at lower elevations by lowland forests, including the Isthmian–Atlantic moist forests on the Atlantic (Caribbean) slope, the Isthmian–Pacific moist forests to the south on the Pacific slope, and the Costa Rican seasonal moist forests to the northwest.

== Flora ==
The forests are made up of evergreen trees, including many species (genera Ocotea, Persea, Nectandra, and Phoebe) of the laurel family (Lauraceae), and two endemic oaks, Quercus costaricensis and Quercus copeyensis. Lauraceae are the predominant canopy trees in the northern mountains, while oaks are dominant in the upper montane forests of the southerly Cordillera de Talamanca.

The forests are highly biodiverse, with many species including many endemic species. The Cordillera de Talamanca is home to an estimated 90% of Costa Rica's plant species. Over 30% of the ecoregion's plant species and over 50% of the high mountain flora are considered endemic.

Lower montane forests occur above 750 meters on the Atlantic slope and up to 1500 meters on the Pacific slope, extending up to 2300 meters elevation. The upper montane forests extend from approximately 2,300 meters up to 3,300 meters elevation. A belt of subalpine dwarf forests forms the transition between the montane forests and the high-elevation páramo alpine grasslands.

Laurels and oaks are the predominant canopy trees in the lower montane forests, growing up to 40 meters high. Quercus copeyensis is the most common oak, and other common canopy trees include Mollinedia viridiflora, Trichilia havanensis, Ardisia glandulosomarginata, Chrysochlamys allenii, Billia hippocastanum, Damburneya salicina, Quetzalia occidentalis, Guarea tonduzii, Alchornea latifolia, Meliosma glabrata, Miconia platyphylla, Lozania mutisiana, Ocotea austinii, and Ocotea holdridgeana. Dwarf palms, including Geonoma orbignyana subsp. hoffmanniana, Chamaedorea warscewiczii, and Prestoea acuminata var. acuminata characterize the shrub layer, with the bamboo Aulonemia viscosa and the palm-like Sphaeradenia laucheana subsp. irazuensis.

Evergreen oaks, chiefly Quercus costaricensis, are the dominant species in the upper montane forests. Oaks make up 80% of the canopy trees at 2650 meters elevation in Cordillera de Talamanca. Sciodaphyllum pittieri is a common canopy tree, along with species of Magnolia and Podocarpus oleifolius. There is a diverse understory of trees, including Frangula oreodendron, Drimys granadensis, Miconia schnellii, Zanthoxylum melanostictum, and Ilex pallida, and species of Weinmannia, Viburnum, Vaccinium, Styrax, Symplocos, Clusia, Araliaceae, Lauraceae, Melastomataceae, and Myrsinaceae. The dwarf bamboo Chusquea talamancensis is predominant in the shrub layer, growing densely to 6 meters high. Other plants in the shrub layer include the ericoid shrubs Disterigma humboldtii, Cavendishia bracteata, Macleania rupestris, and Sphyrospermum buxifolium, and the terrestrial bromeliad Werauhia williamsii. The shrub layer can include tree ferns (family Cyatheaceae), dwarf palms, Sphaeradenia, and shrubs from the plant families Acanthaceae, Ericaceae, Rubiaceae, and Solanaceae. The tree Comarostaphylis arbutoides grows densely near the upper forest limit (approximately 3,200 meters elevation) on the Pacific slope.

== Fauna ==
The Costa Rican portion harbors 136 mammal species, the Panamanian 84. Characteristic mammals include jaguar, cougar, tapir, deer, anteater, and several species of monkey. The Talamancan oryzomys (Nephelomys devius) is endemic to the ecoregion.

Birds are also well represented. The Costa Rican portion holds 450 species, the Panamanian 225. Notable locally threatened birds in the forest are the resplendent quetzal, black guan (Chamaepetes unicolor), sulphur-winged parakeet, three-wattled bellbird, and bare-necked umbrellabird, which is found in both the Costa Rican and Panamanian region, and the harpy eagle, which can be found in the Panamanian region.

The ecoregion corresponds to the Costa Rica and Panama highlands endemic bird area. The Talamanca hummingbird (Eugenes spectabilis), glow-throated hummingbird (Selasphorus ardens), volcano hummingbird (Selasphorus flammula), scintillant hummingbird (Selasphorus scintilla), fiery-throated hummingbird (Panterpe insignis), white-bellied mountaingem (Lampornis hemileucus), purple-throated mountaingem (Lampornis calolaemus), white-throated mountaingem (Lampornis castaneoventris), magenta-throated woodstar (Philodice bryantae), coppery-headed emerald (Microchera cupreiceps), white-tailed emerald (Microchera chionura), black-bellied hummingbird (Eupherusa nigriventris), yellow-green brushfinch (Atlapetes luteoviridis), black guan, buff-fronted quail-dove (Zentrygon costaricensis), Chiriqui quail-dove (Zentrygon chiriquensis), black-breasted wood quail (Odontophorus leucolaemus), Costa Rican pygmy owl (Glaucidium costaricanum), bare-shanked screech owl (Megascops clarkii), orange-bellied trogon (Trogon collaris aurantiiventris), prong-billed barbet (Semnornis frantzii), red-fronted parrotlet (Touit costaricensis), sulphur-winged parakeet (Pyrrhura hoffmanni), silvery-fronted tapaculo (Scytalopus argentifrons), streak-breasted treehunter (Thripadectes rufobrunneus), ruddy treerunner, (Margarornis rubiginosus), bare-necked umbrellabird (Cephalopterus glabricollis), black-capped flycatcher (Empidonax atriceps), dark pewee (Contopus lugubris), ochraceous pewee (Contopus ochraceus), golden-bellied flycatcher (Myiodynastes hemichrysus), yellow-winged vireo (Vireo carmioli), silvery-throated jay (Cyanolyca argentigula), ochraceous wren (Troglodytes ochraceus), timberline wren (Thryorchilus browni), black-faced solitaire (Myadestes melanops), black-billed nightingale-thrush (Catharus gracilirostris), sooty thrush (Turdus nigrescens), black-and-yellow silky-flycatcher (Phainoptila melanoxantha), long-tailed silky flycatcher (Ptiliogonys caudatus), golden-browed chlorophonia (Chlorophonia callophrys), sooty-capped bush tanager (Chlorospingus pileatus), sooty-faced finch (Arremon crassirostris), yellow-thighed finch (Pselliophorus tibialis), yellow-green finch (Pselliophorus luteoviridis), large-footed finch (Pezopetes capitalis), golden-bellied flycatcher (Melozone leucotis), volcano junco (Junco vulcani), wrenthrush (Zeledonia coronata), flame-throated warbler (Oreothlypis gutturalis), black-cheeked warbler (Basileuterus melanogenys), collared whitestart (Myioborus torquatus), black-thighed grosbeak (Pheucticus tibialis), blue-and-gold tanager (Bangsia arcaei), spangle-cheeked tanager (Tangara dowii), peg-billed finch (Acanthidops bairdi), slaty flowerpiercer (Diglossa plumbea), and dusky nightjar (Antrostomus saturatus) are endemic or near-endemic to the ecoregion.

At least 7 amphibian species are endemic to the Cordillera including the splendid poison frog, Chiriquí fire salamander (Bolitoglossa cathyledecae), and Cordillera Talamanca salamander (Bolitoglossa sooyorum).

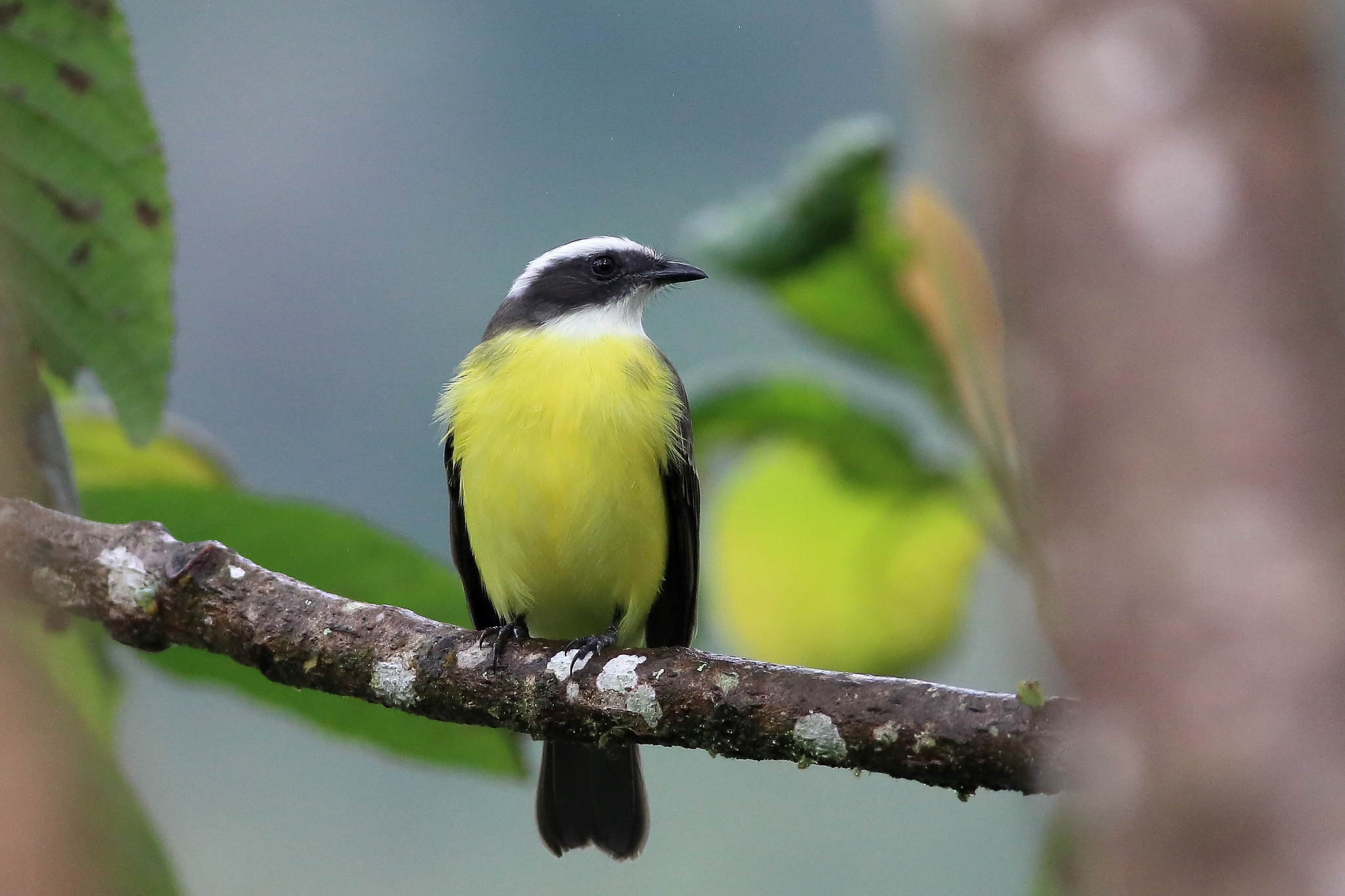
Myiozetetes similis in Sarapiquí, Costa Rica

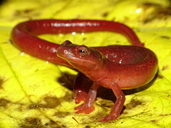
Bolitoglossa cathyledecae in Chiriquí Province, Panama

== Conservation and threats ==
The Talamancan montane forests are one of Central America's most intact ecoregions, although the oak forests in particular have been cleared for pasture and charcoal making. 62% of the ecoregion is protected by national and international parks, including La Amistad Biosphere Reserve, Chirripó National Park, Barbilla National Park, Braulio Carrillo National Park, Volcán Poás National Park, Irazu Volcano National Park, Volcán Barú National Park, Cerro Hoya National Park, Rincón de la Vieja National Park, and the Monteverde Cloud Forest Reserve.
