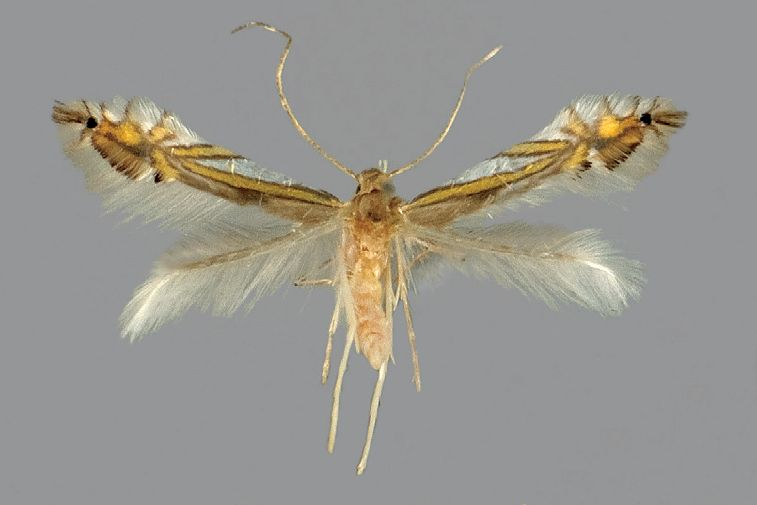
- Female

Scientific classification
- Kingdom: Animalia
- Phylum: Arthropoda
- Clade: Pancrustacea
- Class: Insecta
- Order: Lepidoptera
- Family: Gracillariidae
- Genus: Phyllocnistis
- Species: P. drimiphaga

Binomial name
- Phyllocnistis drimiphaga Kawahara, Nishida & Davis, 2009

= Phyllocnistis drimiphaga =

Species of moth

Phyllocnistis drimiphaga is a moth of the family Gracillariidae. It is endemic to Costa Rica, where it has been recorded from the Cordillera de Talamanca and Cordillera Central in the provinces of Heredia, San José, and Cartago. It inhabits cloud forests at elevations greater than 2,000 m (6,600 ft). The length of the forewings is 2.9–3.5 mm (0.11–0.14 in). The larvae feed on Drimys granadensis.

== Taxonomy ==
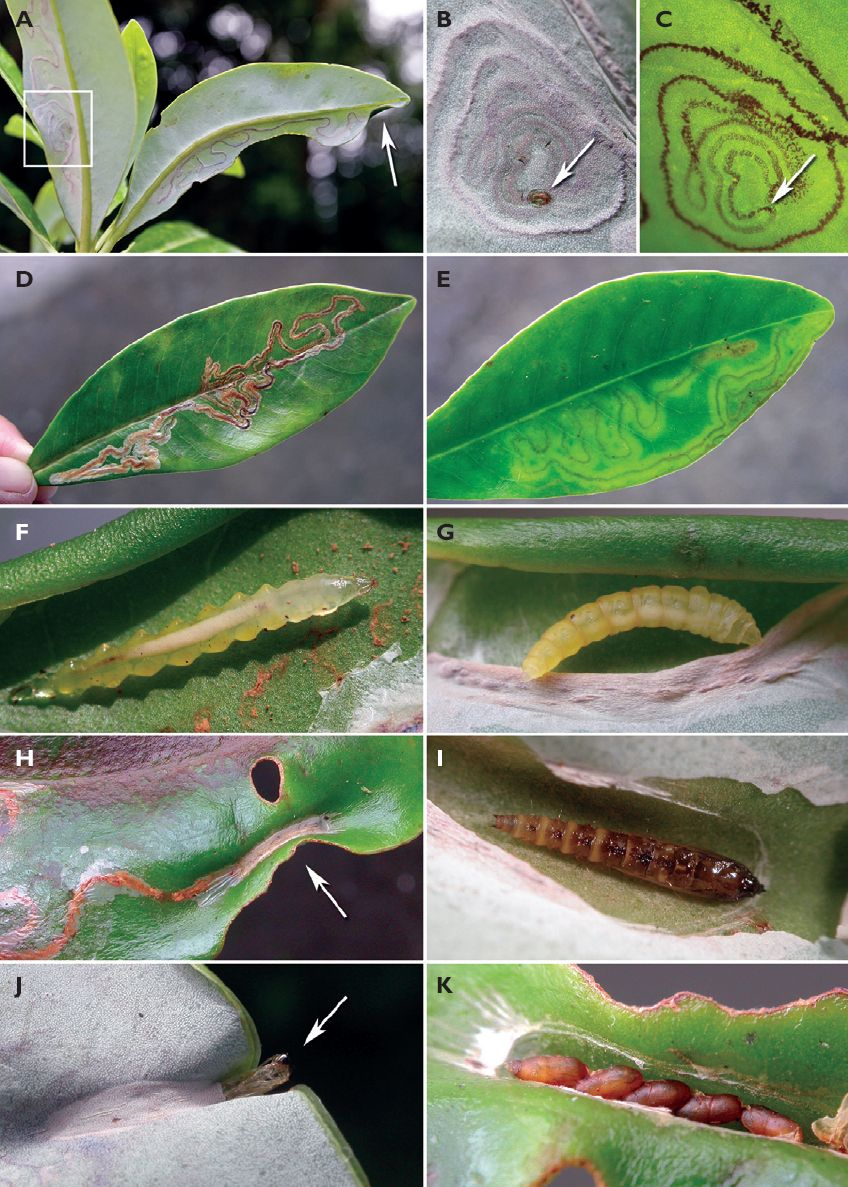
Life history of Phyllocnistis drimiphaga.

Phyllocnistis drimiphaga was formally described in 20009 by based on an adult female specimen collected from near Vara Blanca in the Braulio Carrillo National Park in the Heredia Province of Costa Rica. The specific epithet is derived from the genus of the host, Drimys granadensis, and the Greek word meaning "to eat".

== Description ==
Phyllocnistis drimiphaga is a small species, with adults having a forewing length of 2.9–3.5 mm (0.11–0.14 in) and an abdomen around 2 mm (0.08 in) long. The forewing is silvery-white with a dark brown undersurface. The upper surface of the forewing has orange-yellow costal and longitudinal fascia. The former are thin, with a fine border, and stretch across the further third of the forewing. The latter are wide, with dark gray edges, and stretch diagonally from the costal base across two-thirds of the wing. The transverse fascia are V-shaped. There are three dark grayish-brown costal strigulae on the forewing. The hindwing is creamy white. The head has many silvery-white hairs, a pair of antennae as long as the forewing, and shiny white labial palpi. The legs are silvery-white.

The larvae of the moth make thin, long, and snaking mines on younger leaves fairly close to the undergrowth. Early in their development, these mines are usually shaped like a spiral.

== Distribution and ecology ==
Phyllocnistis drimiphaga is endemic to Costa Rica, where it has been recorded from the Cordillera de Talamanca and Cordillera Central in the provinces of Heredia, San José, and Cartago. It has been documented from Barva Volcano in Braulio Carrillo National Park, Chirripó National Park, and from some reserves on Cerro de la Muerte. It inhabits cloud forests at elevations greater than 2,000 m (6,600 ft). The host for the moth is the Winteraceae plant Drimys granadensis, a neotropical tree that grows in montane environments in Costa Rica. The moth is apparently parasitized by Ceraphronidae, Eulophidae, and Ageniaspis wasps.
