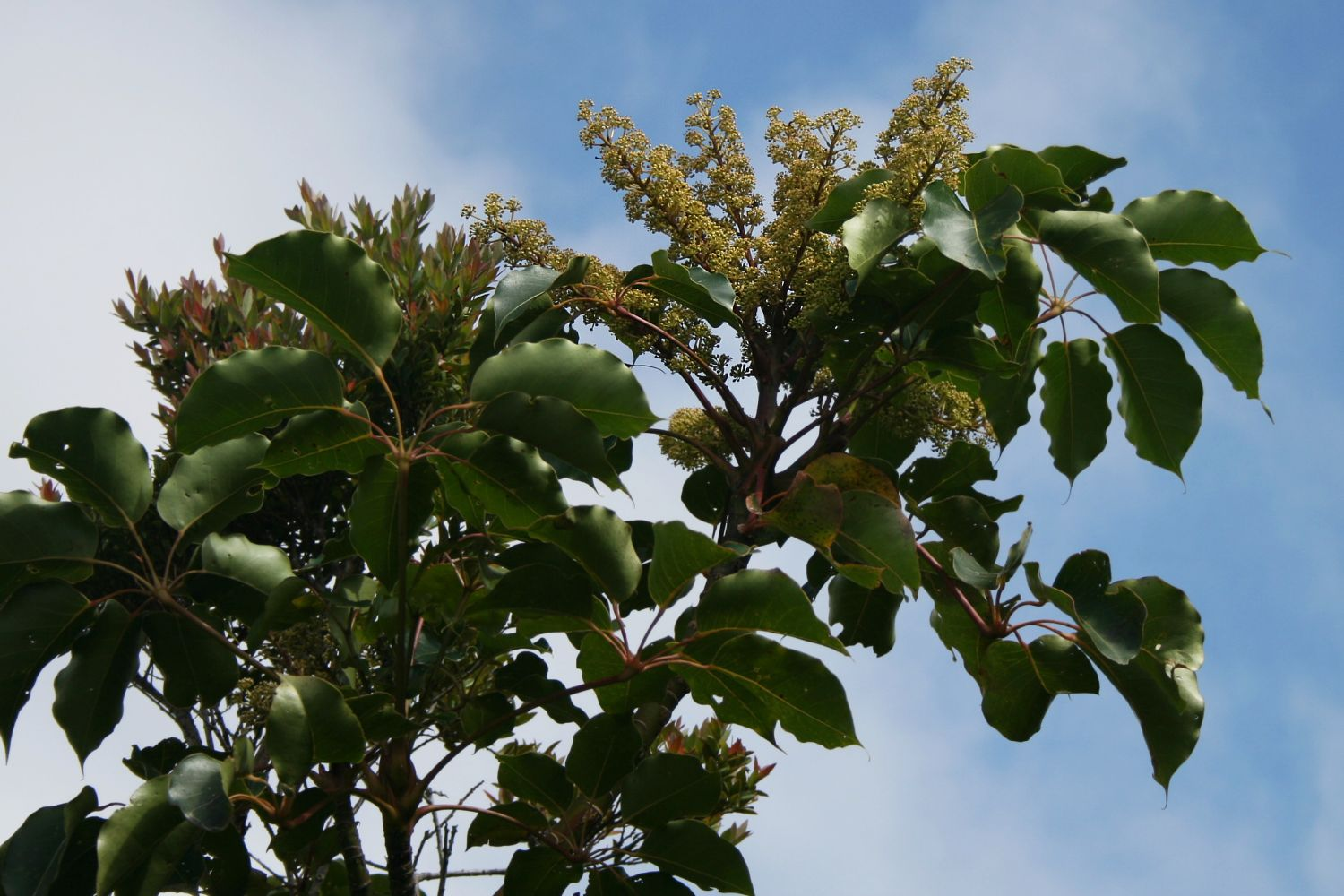

Conservation status
- Least Concern (IUCN 3.1)

Scientific classification
- Kingdom: Plantae
- Clade: Tracheophytes
- Clade: Angiosperms
- Clade: Eudicots
- Clade: Asterids
- Order: Apiales
- Family: Araliaceae
- Subfamily: Aralioideae
- Genus: Sciodaphyllum
- Species: S. pittieri

Binomial name
- Sciodaphyllum pittieri (Marchal ex T.Durand & Pittier) Lowry, G.M.Plunkett & M.M.Mora

Synonyms
- Didymopanax pittieri Marchal ex T.Durand & Pittier; Schefflera rodriguesiana Frodin

= Sciodaphyllum pittieri =

Species of flowering plant

Sciodaphyllum pittieri is a species of flowering plant in the family Araliaceae. It is native to the mountain forests of Costa Rica and western Panama.

== Description ==
Sciodaphyllum pittieri is an evergreen tree, which grows up to 25 meters high, thickly branched, with a trunk up to 40 cm in diameter. The bark is thin, flat, and mottled.

Its leaves are oblong, up to 45 cm long and 19 cm wide, with a pointed tip. They are glossy on the upper side, and densely rusty-hairy underneath. They grow clustered in spirals at the end of stalks up to 1 m long.

The trees bloom from February to September. The inflorescences are dense drooping cylindrical clusters up to 50 cm long, composed of numerous minute white to pale green flowers. Fleshy fruits form from May to September. They are 1 cm long by 4mm wide, white turning red or purple, and each contains two seeds.

== Range and habitat ==
Sciodaphyllum pittieri is native to the mountains of Costa Rica and western Panama, including the Cordillera Central and Cordillera de Talamanca.

It is found in humid montane forests from 800 to 3,200 meters elevation, where it is frequently found in clearings and secondary growth. It is a common canopy tree in upper montane forests dominated by the oak Quercus costaricensis.
