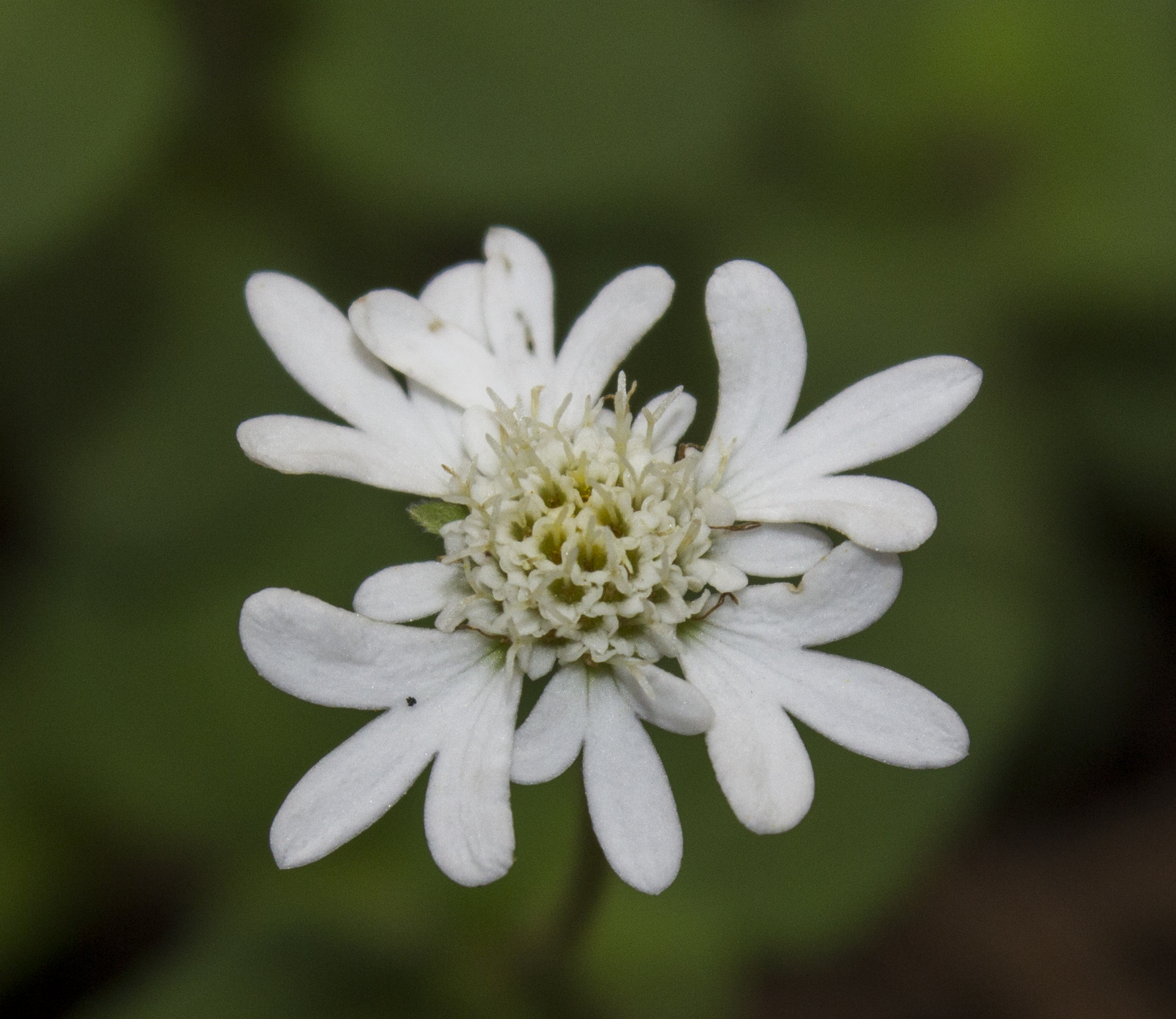
- Microspermum debile

Scientific classification
- Kingdom: Plantae
- Clade: Tracheophytes
- Clade: Angiosperms
- Clade: Eudicots
- Clade: Asterids
- Order: Asterales
- Family: Asteraceae
- Subfamily: Asteroideae
- Tribe: Eupatorieae
- Genus: Microspermum; Lag. 1816 not E.Arber 1914 (a fossil gymnosperm)

= Microspermum =

Genus of flowering plants

Microspermum is a genus of Mexican flowering plants in the tribe Eupatorieae within the family Asteraceae.

Species

- Microspermum debile Benth. - Guerrero, Oaxaca, Chiapas, Michoacán, Jalisco
- Microspermum flaccidum Paul G.Wilson México State
- Microspermum gonzalezii Rzed. - Jalisco
- Microspermum gracillimum Rzed. - Jalisco
- Microspermum hintonii Rzed. - Guerrero
- Microspermum nummulariifolium Lag. - Guerrero, Jalisco, Oaxaca, México State, Michoacán
- Microspermum tenue Paul G.Wilson - Guerrero

formerly included

see Iltisia Piqueriopsis

- Microspermum michoacanum (R.M.King) B.L.Turner, synonym of Piqueriopsis michoacana R.M.King
- Microspermum repens (S.F.Blake) L.O.Williams, synonym of Iltisia repens S.F.Blake
