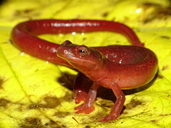

Scientific classification
- Kingdom: Animalia
- Phylum: Chordata
- Class: Amphibia
- Order: Urodela
- Family: Plethodontidae
- Genus: Bolitoglossa
- Species: B. cathyledecae

Binomial name
- Bolitoglossa cathyledecae M. Ponce, D. Navarro, R. Morales & A. Batista, 2022

= Chiriquí fire salamander =

Species of amphibian

The Chiriquí fire salamander (Bolitoglossa cathyledecae), known as "Salamandra de fuego chiricana" in native Spanish, is a species of salamander in the family Plethodontidae. It is found exclusively in Panama and is endemic to the western highlands of Chiriquí Province. Like many Central American endemic species, it is threatened by habitat loss.

== Discovery ==
During expeditions through La Amistad International Park, investigators discovered a salamander that was very distinct from other species in the region. Notably the Chiriqui fire salamander has different coloration, foot webbing, and upper maxillary tooth numbers than other known salamanders. The species was formally described to science in 2022 with a specific epithet chosen by the discoverers to honor Cathy Ledec, a conservationist and supporter of Neotropical salamanders.

== Description ==
The holotype specimen of Chiriquí fire salamander had a head-to-torso length of 46 mm and a tail length of 68.8 mm. The skin is generally salmon in color on the back and sides with pink feet and darker red spotting mostly on the back. The eyes have a black horizonal oval-shaped lens and the iris is flecked with gold and red. The Chiriquí fire salamander has a prehensile tail.

== Distribution and conservation ==
The Chiriquí fire salamander in only known from a single site in the Panamanian Cordillera de Talamanca and apparently inhabits the Talamancan montane forests ecosystem at elevations around 1900 meters. The discoverers suggested that the species be listed as critically endangered by the IUCN, owing to its limited distribution and likely anthropogenic pressures in the area.
