= Nebulosa rudicula =

Scientific classification
- Kingdom: Animalia
- Phylum: Arthropoda
- Clade: Pancrustacea
- Class: Insecta
- Order: Lepidoptera
- Superfamily: Noctuoidea
- Family: Notodontidae
- Genus: Nebulosa
- Species: N. rudicula

Binomial name
- Nebulosa rudicula Miller, 2008

Species of moth

Nebulosa rudicula is a moth of the family Notodontidae first described by James S. Miller in 2008. The length of the forewings is 17.5–18 mm for males. It is endemic to the Pacific versant of the Cordillera de Talamanca in Costa Rica, where it is known from elevations of 2,500–2,650 m (8,200–8,690 ft).

== Taxonomy ==
Nebulosa rudicula was formally described by the American entomologist James S. Miller in 2008 based on a male collected from San José Province in Costa Rica. Its specific epithet is derived from the Latin word for a spatula, alluding to the unique spoon-shaped valva the species possesses.

== Description ==
The length of the forewings is 17.5–18 mm for males. The forewings are fuscous with an ovoid whitish fascia past the distal cell and a concolorous, slightly more unicolor underside. The hindwings are nearly transparent.

== Distribution and habitat ==
Nebulosa rudicula is endemic to Costa Rica, where it is found on the Pacific versant of the Cordillera de Talamanca. It has been documented from only from three locations in San José Province, but further surveys are required to confirm the extent of its range. Specimens of the present species are likely to have been misidentified as N. halesius in historical collections. It has been recorded at elevations of 2,500–2,650 m (8,200–8,690 ft).
