= N. grimaldii =

N. grimaldii may refer to:

- Nebulosa grimaldii, a species of moth in the family Notodontidae
- Neolithodes grimaldii, the porcupine crab, a species of king crab
