= Talamancalia =

Scientific classification
- Kingdom: Plantae
- Clade: Tracheophytes
- Clade: Angiosperms
- Clade: Eudicots
- Clade: Asterids
- Order: Asterales
- Family: Asteraceae
- Subfamily: Asteroideae
- Tribe: Senecioneae
- Genus: Talamancalia; H.Rob. & Cuatrec.

Genus of flowering plant

Talamancalia is a genus of flowering plants in the family Asteraceae. It contains two species native to Costa Rica and Panama:

- Talamancalia boquetensis (Standl.) H. Rob. & Cuatrec.
- Talamancalia westonii H.Rob. & Cuatrec.

Synonyms:

- Talamancalia fosbergii (Cuatrec.) B.Nord. = Lomanthus fosbergii (Cuatrec.) B.Nord. & Pelser
- Talamancalia putcalensis (Hieron.) B.Nord. & J.F. Pruski = Lomanthus putcalensis (Hieron.) B.Nord.
- Talamancalia westonii H. Rob. & Cuatrec. = Pseudogynoxys westonii (H. Rob. & Cuatrec.) B.L. Turner
- Pseudogynoxys boquetensis (Standl.) B.L. Turner = Talamancalia boquetensis (Standl.) H. Rob. & Cuatrec.
- Senecio boquetensis Standl. = Talamancalia boquetensis (Standl.) H. Rob. & Cuatrec.
