= Nebulosa cistrina =

Scientific classification
- Kingdom: Animalia
- Phylum: Arthropoda
- Clade: Pancrustacea
- Class: Insecta
- Order: Lepidoptera
- Superfamily: Noctuoidea
- Family: Notodontidae
- Genus: Nebulosa
- Species: N. cistrina

Binomial name
- Nebulosa cistrina (H. Druce, 1899)

Synonyms
- Polypoetes cistrina H. Druce, 1899

Species of moth

Nebulosa cistrina is a moth of the family Notodontidae. It is found in south-eastern Ecuador.
