= Nebulosa elicioi =

Scientific classification
- Kingdom: Animalia
- Phylum: Arthropoda
- Clade: Pancrustacea
- Class: Insecta
- Order: Lepidoptera
- Superfamily: Noctuoidea
- Family: Notodontidae
- Genus: Nebulosa
- Species: N. elicioi

Binomial name
- Nebulosa elicioi Miller, 2008

Species of moth

Nebulosa elicioi is a moth of the family Notodontidae first described by James S. Miller in 2008. It is endemic to the eastern slope of the Ecuadorian Andes.

The length of the forewings is 12.5–14 mm for males and 13–14 mm for females.

The larvae feed on Casearia arboreum and Siparuna lepidota.

== Etymology ==
The species is named in honor of Elicio Tapia, from Quito, Ecuador.
