= Nebulosa rabae =

Scientific classification
- Kingdom: Animalia
- Phylum: Arthropoda
- Clade: Pancrustacea
- Class: Insecta
- Order: Lepidoptera
- Superfamily: Noctuoidea
- Family: Notodontidae
- Genus: Nebulosa
- Species: N. rabae

Binomial name
- Nebulosa rabae Miller, 2008

Species of moth

Nebulosa rabae is a moth of the family Notodontidae. It is found in cloud forests on the eastern slope of the Ecuadorian Andes, in the Napo Province.

The length of the forewings is 12.5–14 mm for males and 13–14 mm for females.
