= Nebulosa nervosa =

Scientific classification
- Kingdom: Animalia
- Phylum: Arthropoda
- Clade: Pancrustacea
- Class: Insecta
- Order: Lepidoptera
- Superfamily: Noctuoidea
- Family: Notodontidae
- Genus: Nebulosa
- Species: N. nervosa

Binomial name
- Nebulosa nervosa (Edwards, 1884)

Synonyms
- Dioptis nervosus Edwards, 1884

Species of moth

Nebulosa nervosa is a moth of the family Notodontidae. It is found in Mexico and Guatemala.
