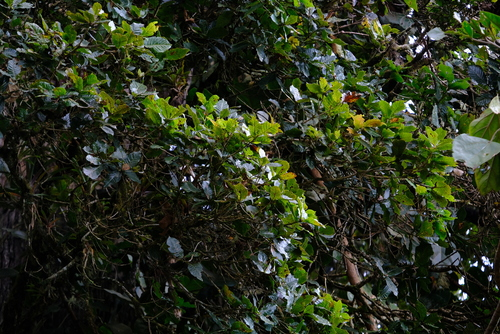

Scientific classification
- Kingdom: Plantae
- Clade: Tracheophytes
- Clade: Angiosperms
- Clade: Eudicots
- Clade: Rosids
- Order: Fagales
- Family: Fagaceae
- Genus: Quercus
- Subgenus: Quercus subg. Quercus
- Section: Quercus sect. Quercus
- Species: Q. copeyensis

Binomial name
- Quercus copeyensis C.H. Mull.

Synonyms
- Quercus costaricensis f. kuntzei Trel.; Quercus pacayana C.H.Mull.

= Quercus copeyensis =

Species of plant

Quercus copeyensis is a species of oak endemic to the Talamancan montane forests of Costa Rica and Panama. It is commonly called Panamanian oak.

Quercus copeyensis is a large deciduous tree up to 35 metres (115 feet) tall with a trunk frequently more than 100 centimetres (39 inches) in diameter. The leaves are often clustered at the ends of branches, with blades up to 15 centimetres (6 inches) long.

It is often found with Quercus costaricensis in upper montane forests, up to 3,100 m (10,200 ft) in elevation.
