= Nebulosa aliena =

Scientific classification
- Kingdom: Animalia
- Phylum: Arthropoda
- Clade: Pancrustacea
- Class: Insecta
- Order: Lepidoptera
- Superfamily: Noctuoidea
- Family: Notodontidae
- Genus: Nebulosa
- Species: N. aliena

Binomial name
- Nebulosa aliena (Dognin, 1904)

Synonyms
- Tithraustes aliena Dognin, 1904

Species of moth

Nebulosa aliena is a moth of the family Notodontidae. It is found in the eastern Andes of Bolivia and Peru.
