= Nebulosa albitumida =

Scientific classification
- Kingdom: Animalia
- Phylum: Arthropoda
- Clade: Pancrustacea
- Class: Insecta
- Order: Lepidoptera
- Superfamily: Noctuoidea
- Family: Notodontidae
- Genus: Nebulosa
- Species: N. albitumida

Binomial name
- Nebulosa albitumida (Dognin, 1902)

Synonyms
- Phaeochlaena albitumida Dognin, 1902

Species of moth

Nebulosa albitumida is a moth of the family Notodontidae. It is found along the eastern slope of the Andes in south-eastern Ecuador.
