= Nebulosa latialbata =

Scientific classification
- Kingdom: Animalia
- Phylum: Arthropoda
- Clade: Pancrustacea
- Class: Insecta
- Order: Lepidoptera
- Superfamily: Noctuoidea
- Family: Notodontidae
- Genus: Nebulosa
- Species: N. latialbata

Binomial name
- Nebulosa latialbata (L. B. Prout, 1918)

Synonyms
- Tithraustes latialbata Prout, 1918

Species of moth

Nebulosa latialbata is a moth of the family Notodontidae first described by Louis Beethoven Prout in 1918. It is found in eastern Ecuador.
