= Nebulosa mirma =

Scientific classification
- Kingdom: Animalia
- Phylum: Arthropoda
- Clade: Pancrustacea
- Class: Insecta
- Order: Lepidoptera
- Superfamily: Noctuoidea
- Family: Notodontidae
- Genus: Nebulosa
- Species: N. mirma

Binomial name
- Nebulosa mirma (H. Druce, 1899)

Synonyms
- Polypoetes mirma H. Druce, 1899; Momonipta semilugens Warren, 1900

Species of moth

Nebulosa mirma is a moth of the family Notodontidae first described by Herbert Druce in 1899. It is found in Bolivia and Peru.
