= Nebulosa yanayacu =

Scientific classification
- Kingdom: Animalia
- Phylum: Arthropoda
- Clade: Pancrustacea
- Class: Insecta
- Order: Lepidoptera
- Superfamily: Noctuoidea
- Family: Notodontidae
- Genus: Nebulosa
- Species: N. yanayacu

Binomial name
- Nebulosa yanayacu Miller, 2008

Species of moth

Nebulosa yanayacu is a moth of the family Notodontidae first described by James S. Miller in 2008. It is found along the eastern slope of the Ecuadorian Andes.

The length of the forewings is 12–14 mm for males and 12.5–14.5 mm for females.
