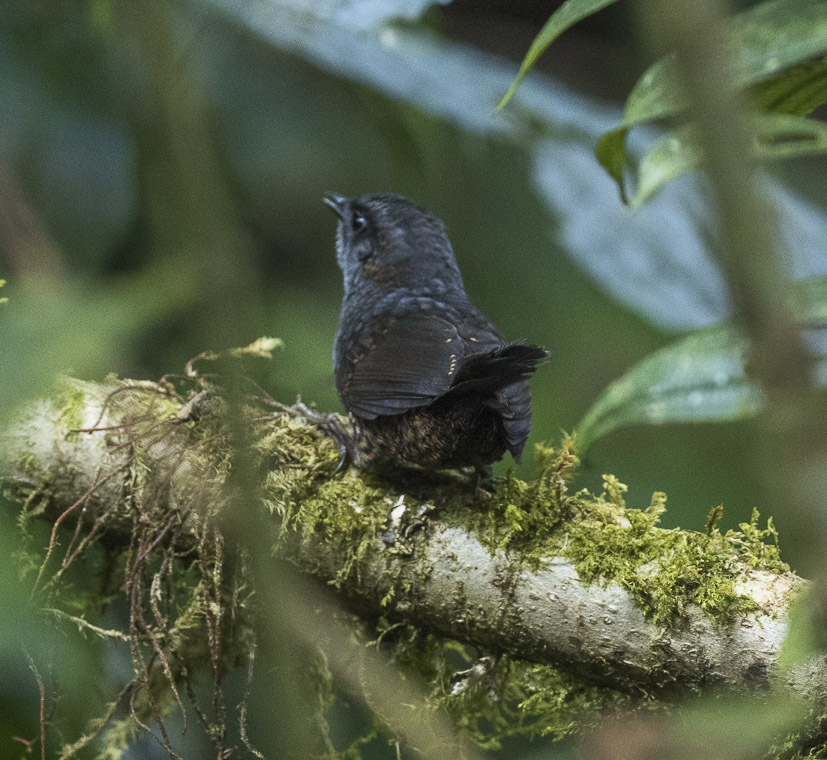

Conservation status
- Least Concern (IUCN 3.1)

Scientific classification
- Kingdom: Animalia
- Phylum: Chordata
- Class: Aves
- Order: Passeriformes
- Family: Rhinocryptidae
- Genus: Scytalopus
- Species: S. argentifrons

Binomial name
- Scytalopus argentifrons Ridgway, 1891

= Silvery-fronted tapaculo =

Species of bird

The silvery-fronted tapaculo (Scytalopus argentifrons) is a species of bird in the family Rhinocryptidae. It is found in Costa Rica and Panama.

== Taxonomy and systematics ==
The silvery-fronted tapaculo has two subspecies, the nominate "silvery-fronted" Scytalopus argentifrons argentifrons and the "Chiriqui" S. a. chiriquensis. The Chiriqui subspecies has at times been considered a separate species.

== Description ==
The silvery-fronted tapaculo is 11 cm (4.3 in) long and weighs 17 g (0.60 oz). The male of the nominate subspecies is mostly sooty black; the lower breast and belly are paler. The flanks and crissum (the area around the cloaca) are brownish red. It has a silvery forehead (the "front") and a white supercilium. The male Chiriqui is darker with a less prominent supercilium. The females of both subspecies do not have a supercilium; their upper parts are dark brown, the throat and breast are dark gray, the belly blackish, and the flanks and crissum brighter brownish red than the male's. The juvenile is similar to the female but darker with brown "scales" on the underparts.

== Distribution and habitat ==
The silvery-fronted tapaculo is the only member of its family whose entire range is in Central America. (The Tacarcuna tapaculo, S. panamensis, is found in far southern Panama and Colombia.) It inhabits the Talamancan montane forests at elevations of 1,000 to 3,000 m (3,300 to 9,800 ft). The Chiriqui subspecies is found only in western Panama. The nominate S. a. argentifrons has the wider range, from western Panama north through Costa Rica almost to the border with Nicaragua. If frequents thickets and bamboo in the undergrowth of humid primary forest and secondary forest, especially in ravines and along streams.

== Behavior ==
=== Feeding ===
The silvery-fronted tapaculo forages for insects and other arthropods while creeping and hopping along the ground.

=== Breeding ===
The silvery-fronted tapaculo's breeding phenology has not been described.

=== Vocalization ===
The silvery-fronted tapaculo's song is a series of notes that slow but get louder during its five to 10 second duration . Its call is similar but shorter .

== Status ==
The IUCN has assessed the silvery-fronted tapaculo as being of Least Concern. Though it has a restricted range and its population number is not known, it appears to be fairly common and occurs in protected areas.
