= Nebulosa crypsispila =

Scientific classification
- Kingdom: Animalia
- Phylum: Arthropoda
- Clade: Pancrustacea
- Class: Insecta
- Order: Lepidoptera
- Superfamily: Noctuoidea
- Family: Notodontidae
- Genus: Nebulosa
- Species: N. crypsispila

Binomial name
- Nebulosa crypsispila (Warren, 1901)

Synonyms
- Phaeochlaena crypsispila Warren, 1901

Species of moth

Nebulosa crypsispila is a moth of the family Notodontidae. It is found in Panama and Costa Rica.
