= Nebulosa bialbifera =

Scientific classification
- Kingdom: Animalia
- Phylum: Arthropoda
- Clade: Pancrustacea
- Class: Insecta
- Order: Lepidoptera
- Superfamily: Noctuoidea
- Family: Notodontidae
- Genus: Nebulosa
- Species: N. bialbifera

Binomial name
- Nebulosa bialbifera (Warren, 1904)

Synonyms
- Phaeochlaena bialbifera Warren, 1904

Species of moth

Nebulosa bialbifera is a moth of the family Notodontidae. It is found in Ecuador.
