= Nebulosa =

Scientific classification
- Kingdom: Animalia
- Phylum: Arthropoda
- Clade: Pancrustacea
- Class: Insecta
- Order: Lepidoptera
- Superfamily: Noctuoidea
- Family: Notodontidae
- Tribe: Dioptini
- Genus: Nebulosa; J.S. Miller, 2009

Genus of moths

Nebulosa is a genus of moths of the family Notodontidae. It consists of the following species:

- Nebulosa albitumida (Dognin, 1902)
- Nebulosa aliena (Dognin, 1904)
- Nebulosa bialbifera (Warren, 1904)
- Nebulosa cistrina (Druce, 1899)
- Nebulosa cistrinoides (Dognin, 1909)
- Nebulosa cletor (Druce, 1893)
- Nebulosa creon (Druce, 1885)
- Nebulosa crypsispila (Warren, 1901)
- Nebulosa delicata Miller, 2008
- Nebulosa elicioi Miller, 2008
- Nebulosa erymas (Druce, 1885)
- Nebulosa fulvipalpis (Dognin, 1910)
- Nebulosa grimaldii Miller, 2008
- Nebulosa halesius (Druce, 1885)
- Nebulosa hermani Miller, 2008
- Nebulosa huacamayensis Miller, 2008
- Nebulosa inaequiplaga (Dognin, 1911)
- Nebulosa latialbata (Prout, 1918)
- Nebulosa mirma (Druce, 1899)
- Nebulosa nasor (Druce, 1899)
- Nebulosa nervosa (Edwards, 1884)
- Nebulosa ocellata Miller, 2008
- Nebulosa plataea (Druce, 1893)
- Nebulosa rabae Miller, 2008
- Nebulosa rawlinsi Miller, 2008
- Nebulosa rudicula Miller, 2008
- Nebulosa sirenia (Hering, 1925)
- Nebulosa thanatos (Hering, 1925)
- Nebulosa tiznon (Dognin, 1899)
- Nebulosa yanayacu Miller, 2008
