= Nebulosa ocellata =

Scientific classification
- Kingdom: Animalia
- Phylum: Arthropoda
- Clade: Pancrustacea
- Class: Insecta
- Order: Lepidoptera
- Superfamily: Noctuoidea
- Family: Notodontidae
- Genus: Nebulosa
- Species: N. ocellata

Binomial name
- Nebulosa ocellata Miller, 2008

Species of moth

Nebulosa ocellata is a moth of the family Notodontidae first described by James S. Miller in 2008. The length of the forewings is 12.5–13 mm for males and 13-14.5 mm for females. It is native to the eastern versant of the Peruvian and Bolivian Andes at elevations of 1,200–2,300 m (3,900–7,500 ft).

== Taxonomy ==
Prior to its description, specimens of Nebulosa ocellata were misidentified as being N. plataea. Nebulosa ocellata was formally described by the American entomologist James S. Miller in 2008 based on a male collected from Cosñipata Valley in the department of Cusco, Peru. Its specific epithet is derived from the Latin word for "having small eyes", alluding to its conspicuously small eyes, which help distinguish it from N. plataea.

== Description ==
The length of the forewings is 12.5–13 mm for males and 13-14.5 mm for females. The forewing is charcoal gray to fuscous with yellow-orange veins and a spotless white triangle on the distal end. The underside is similarly colored and lacks the colored veins. The hindwing is medially white and translucent, bordered by a dark gray margin along the edge of the wing.

== Distribution and habitat ==
Nebulosa ocellata is native to Peru and Bolivia, where it is found on the eastern versant of the Andes. It has been documented from Cochabamba in Bolivia north to southeastern Peru. It is widely separated from the closely-related N. plataea in terms of its currently-known distribution, which further sampling between Cusco and Loja, Ecuador may help clarify. It has been recorded at elevations of 1,200–2,300 m (3,900–7,500 ft).
