= Nebulosa thanatos =

Scientific classification
- Kingdom: Animalia
- Phylum: Arthropoda
- Clade: Pancrustacea
- Class: Insecta
- Order: Lepidoptera
- Superfamily: Noctuoidea
- Family: Notodontidae
- Genus: Nebulosa
- Species: N. thanatos

Binomial name
- Nebulosa thanatos (Hering, 1925)

Synonyms
- Tithraustes thanatos Hering, 1925

Species of moth

Nebulosa thanatos is a moth of the family Notodontidae. It is found in Peru and Bolivia.
