= Nebulosa tiznon =

Scientific classification
- Kingdom: Animalia
- Phylum: Arthropoda
- Clade: Pancrustacea
- Class: Insecta
- Order: Lepidoptera
- Superfamily: Noctuoidea
- Family: Notodontidae
- Genus: Nebulosa
- Species: N. tiznon

Binomial name
- Nebulosa tiznon (Dognin, 1899)

Synonyms
- Polypoetes tiznon Dognin, 1894

Species of moth

Nebulosa tiznon is a moth of the family Notodontidae. It is endemic to south-eastern Ecuador.
