= Nebulosa erymas =

Scientific classification
- Kingdom: Animalia
- Phylum: Arthropoda
- Clade: Pancrustacea
- Class: Insecta
- Order: Lepidoptera
- Superfamily: Noctuoidea
- Family: Notodontidae
- Genus: Nebulosa
- Species: N. erymas

Binomial name
- Nebulosa erymas (H. Druce, 1885)

Synonyms
- Polypoetes erymas H. Druce, 1885; Tithraustes albifera Warren, 1901; Tithraustes undulata Hering, 1925

Species of moth

Nebulosa erymas is a moth of the family Notodontidae first described by Herbert Druce in 1885. It is found in Panama and Costa Rica.

The larvae feed on Cestrum megalophyllum and Perrottetia longistylis.
