= Cerro Kamuk =

Mountain in Costa Rica

- Location within Costa Rica

Highest point
- Elevation: 3,549 m (11,644 ft)
- Coordinates: 9°17′N 83°02′W

Geography
- Location: Costa Rica
- Parent range: Cordillera de Talamanca

Cerro Kamuk (also known as Cerro Pico Blanco) is a mountain in the Cordillera de Talamanca, in La Amistad International Park, in eastern Costa Rica, close to the border with Panama. It rises to 3,549 metres (11,644 ft) above sea level. It is one of the highest mountains in Central America. Indigenous peoples of the area include the Bribris and Cabecar. The area protected comprised four national parks clustered together that became La Amistad Biosphere Reserve. UNESCO declared it a natural World Heritage Site in 1983. It is part of the Mesoamerican Biological Corridor, UNESCO's project shared by eight Central American countries (Panama, Costa Rica, Nicaragua, El Salvador, Honduras, Belize, Guatemala and Mexico) to help protect the remaining pristine mountain forest and wildlife of Central America.

== Access ==
A trail has been established to access the peak, which begins in the small community of Tres Colinas (Tres Colinas can be accessed by four-wheel drive from the town of Portero Grande). Access to the trail is primarily managed through the community-based organization called Asotur Tres Colinas. The National System of Conservation Areas or SINAC also has a station in Tres Colinas, but as of March 2020 it is not being staffed. The trek is 55 kilometers round trip with three designated camp areas along the route. Camp 1 is located just after kilometer 10 kilometres (6 mi) along a small creek, camp 2 is at kilometer 18 kilometres (11 mi) and also along a creek, and camp 3 is at kilometer 25 kilometres (16 mi), and the summit is at 27.5 kilometres (17 mi). Asotur currently requires that all parties be accompanied by a guide when entering the park via the Cerro Kamuk trail. The trail follows the ridge and crosses many other peaks including: Kutsi, Bekom, Kasir, Nai, Dudo, and Apri before arriving at Kamuk. Water is only easily accessible at camp areas.

== Flora and Fauna ==
The trail to Kamuk begins amidst former agricultural lands that are being reclaimed by forest, and then enters montane oak forest rich with epiphytes, at higher elevation the trail passes through peat bogs, and eventually enters páramo. Chusquea bamboo is common along the trail especially at higher elevation. The area is home to abundant wildlife including puma, jaguar, tayra, brocket deer and tapir.
