= Nebulosa plataea =

Scientific classification
- Kingdom: Animalia
- Phylum: Arthropoda
- Clade: Pancrustacea
- Class: Insecta
- Order: Lepidoptera
- Superfamily: Noctuoidea
- Family: Notodontidae
- Genus: Nebulosa
- Species: N. plataea

Binomial name
- Nebulosa plataea (H. Druce, 1893)

Synonyms
- Trochiodes plataea H. Druce, 1893

Species of moth

Nebulosa plataea is a moth of the family Notodontidae first described by Herbert Druce in 1893. It is found in Ecuador.
