= Nebulosa inaequiplaga =

Scientific classification
- Kingdom: Animalia
- Phylum: Arthropoda
- Clade: Pancrustacea
- Class: Insecta
- Order: Lepidoptera
- Superfamily: Noctuoidea
- Family: Notodontidae
- Genus: Nebulosa
- Species: N. inaequiplaga

Binomial name
- Nebulosa inaequiplaga (Dognin, 1911)

Synonyms
- Tithraustes inaequiplaga Dognin, 1911

Species of moth

Nebulosa inaequiplaga is a moth of the family Notodontidae. It is found in western Colombia.
