= Nebulosa nasor =

Scientific classification
- Kingdom: Animalia
- Phylum: Arthropoda
- Clade: Pancrustacea
- Class: Insecta
- Order: Lepidoptera
- Superfamily: Noctuoidea
- Family: Notodontidae
- Genus: Nebulosa
- Species: N. nasor

Binomial name
- Nebulosa nasor (H. Druce, 1899)

Synonyms
- Devara nasor H. Druce, 1899

Species of moth

Nebulosa nasor is a moth of the family Notodontidae first described by Herbert Druce in 1899. It is found along the western slope of the Colombian Andes.

The length of the forewings is 17–18.5 mm for males and 20 mm for females.
