= Nebulosa rawlinsi =

Scientific classification
- Kingdom: Animalia
- Phylum: Arthropoda
- Clade: Pancrustacea
- Class: Insecta
- Order: Lepidoptera
- Superfamily: Noctuoidea
- Family: Notodontidae
- Genus: Nebulosa
- Species: N. rawlinsi

Binomial name
- Nebulosa rawlinsi Miller, 2008

Species of moth

Nebulosa rawlinsi is a moth of the family Notodontidae first described by James S. Miller in 2008. It is known from two cloud forest localities: Maldonado on the western slope of the Andes in northern Ecuador, near the Colombian border and La Otonga Reserve, also on the western side of the Ecuadorian Andes, located between the towns of San Francisco de Las Pampas and La Union del Toachi.

The length of the forewings is 11-12.5 mm for males.

== Etymology ==
The species is named after John E. Rawlins, curator of Lepidoptera at the Carnegie Museum of Natural History, Pittsburgh.
