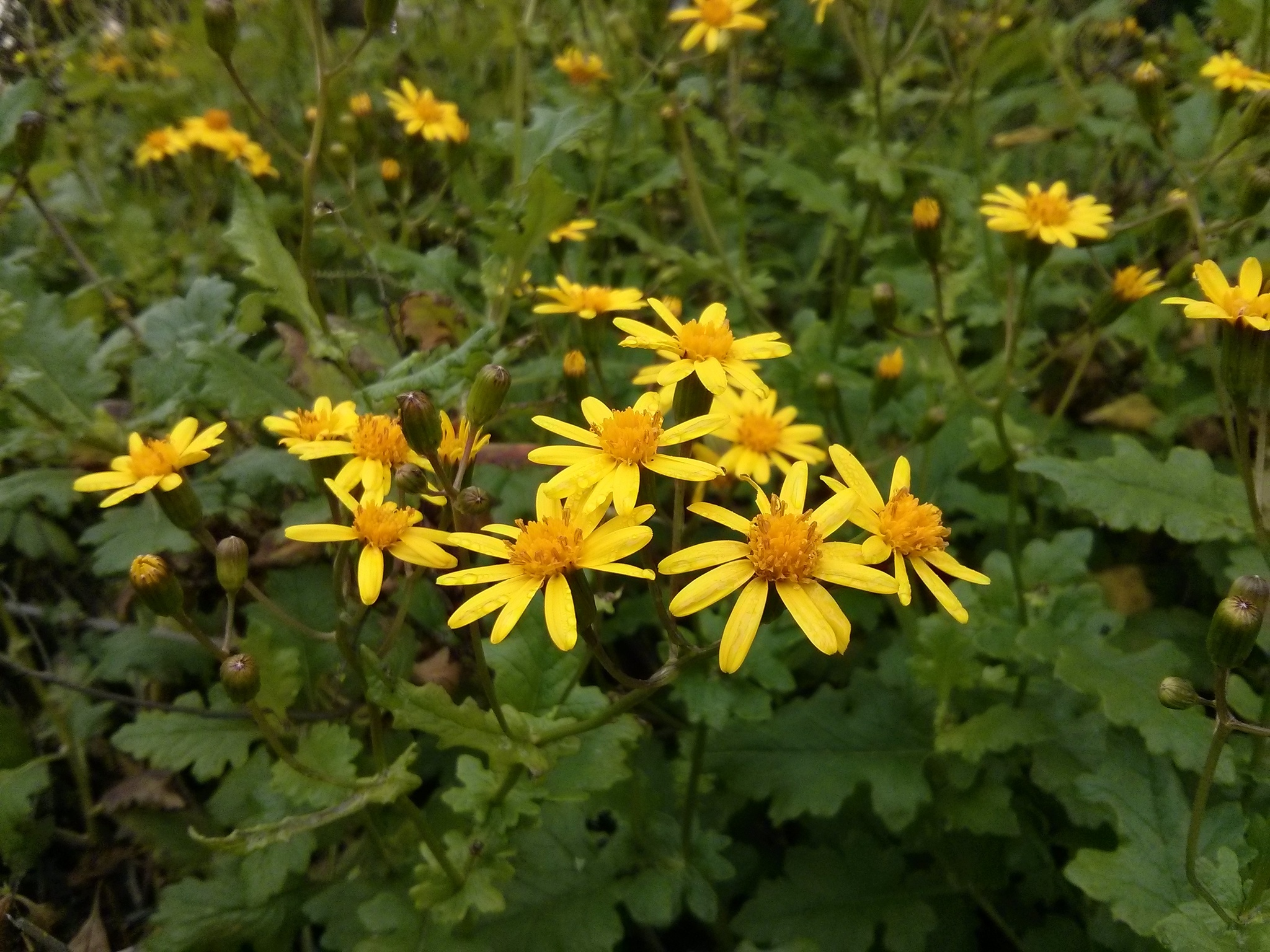
- Lomanthus lomincola

Scientific classification
- Kingdom: Plantae
- Clade: Tracheophytes
- Clade: Angiosperms
- Clade: Eudicots
- Clade: Asterids
- Order: Asterales
- Family: Asteraceae
- Subfamily: Asteroideae
- Tribe: Senecioneae
- Genus: Lomanthus; B.Nord. & Pelser

Species
- See text.

= Lomanthus =

Genus of plants

Lomanthus is a genus of flowering plant in the family Asteraceae, with species native to north-western Argentina, Bolivia, Ecuador and Peru. The genus was established in 2009. It was split from the genus Senecio on the basis of morphological and molecular phylogenetic evidence.

== Species ==
As of March 2023, Plants of the World Online accepted the following species:

- Lomanthus abadianus (DC.) B.Nord. & Pelser
- Lomanthus albaniae (H.Beltrán) B.Nord. & Pelser
- Lomanthus arnaldii (Cabrera) B.Nord. & Pelser
- Lomanthus bangii (Rusby) B.Nord. & Pelser
- Lomanthus calachaquensis (Cabrera) B.Nord.
- Lomanthus cantensis (Cabrera) P.Gonzáles
- Lomanthus cerrateae (Cabrera) B.Nord. & Pelser
- Lomanthus cuatrecasasii (Cabrera) P.Gonzáles
- Lomanthus fosbergii (Cuatrec.) B.Nord. & Pelser
- Lomanthus icaensis (H.Beltrán & A.Galán) B.Nord.
- Lomanthus infernalis (Cabrera) H.Beltrán
- Lomanthus lomincola (Cabrera) B.Nord. & Pelser
- Lomanthus mollendoensis (Cabrera) B.Nord.
- Lomanthus okopanus (Cabrera) B.Nord.
- Lomanthus putcalensis (Hieron.) B.Nord.
- Lomanthus subcandidus (A.Gray) B.Nord.
- Lomanthus tovarii (Cabrera) B.Nord. & Pelser
- Lomanthus truxillensis (Cabrera) B.Nord.
- Lomanthus velardei (Cabrera) B.Nord. & Pelser
- Lomanthus yauyensis (Cabrera) B.Nord. & Pelser
