= Nebulosa cistrinoides =

Scientific classification
- Kingdom: Animalia
- Phylum: Arthropoda
- Clade: Pancrustacea
- Class: Insecta
- Order: Lepidoptera
- Superfamily: Noctuoidea
- Family: Notodontidae
- Genus: Nebulosa
- Species: N. cistrinoides

Binomial name
- Nebulosa cistrinoides (Dognin, 1909)

Synonyms
- Polypoetes cistrinoides Dognin, 1909

Species of moth

Nebulosa cistrinoides is a moth of the family Notodontidae. It is found in Colombia.
