= Nebulosa fulvipalpis =

Scientific classification
- Kingdom: Animalia
- Phylum: Arthropoda
- Clade: Pancrustacea
- Class: Insecta
- Order: Lepidoptera
- Superfamily: Noctuoidea
- Family: Notodontidae
- Genus: Nebulosa
- Species: N. fulvipalpis

Binomial name
- Nebulosa fulvipalpis (Dognin, 1910)

Synonyms
- Polypoetes fulvipalpis Dognin, 1910

Species of moth

Nebulosa fulvipalpis is a moth of the family Notodontidae. It is found on mid elevations on the western slope of the Andes, from Cali, Colombia, south to Pichincha, Ecuador.
