= Nebulosa halesius =

Scientific classification
- Kingdom: Animalia
- Phylum: Arthropoda
- Clade: Pancrustacea
- Class: Insecta
- Order: Lepidoptera
- Superfamily: Noctuoidea
- Family: Notodontidae
- Genus: Nebulosa
- Species: N. halesius

Binomial name
- Nebulosa halesius (H. Druce, 1885)

Synonyms
- Polypoetes halesius H. Druce, 1885

Species of moth

Nebulosa halesius is a moth of the family Notodontidae first described by Herbert Druce in 1885. It is found in Costa Rica.

The ground color of the forewings is reddish brown.
