= Nebulosa delicata =

Scientific classification
- Kingdom: Animalia
- Phylum: Arthropoda
- Clade: Pancrustacea
- Class: Insecta
- Order: Lepidoptera
- Superfamily: Noctuoidea
- Family: Notodontidae
- Genus: Nebulosa
- Species: N. delicata

Binomial name
- Nebulosa delicata Miller, 2008

Species of moth

Nebulosa delicata is a moth of the family Notodontidae first described by James S. Miller in 2008. It is found in western Ecuador as far north as Chical (Carchi Province) on the Colombian border.

The length of the forewings is 10–12 mm for males and 11–13 mm for females.
