= Nebulosa huacamayensis =

Scientific classification
- Kingdom: Animalia
- Phylum: Arthropoda
- Clade: Pancrustacea
- Class: Insecta
- Order: Lepidoptera
- Superfamily: Noctuoidea
- Family: Notodontidae
- Genus: Nebulosa
- Species: N. huacamayensis

Binomial name
- Nebulosa huacamayensis Miller, 2008

Species of moth

Nebulosa huacamayensis is a moth of the family Notodontidae first described by James S. Miller in 2008. It is found in cloud-forest habitats in Ecuador.

The length of the forewings is 12–14 mm for males and about 13 mm for females.
