= Nebulosa cletor =

Scientific classification
- Kingdom: Animalia
- Phylum: Arthropoda
- Clade: Pancrustacea
- Class: Insecta
- Order: Lepidoptera
- Superfamily: Noctuoidea
- Family: Notodontidae
- Genus: Nebulosa
- Species: N. cletor

Binomial name
- Nebulosa cletor (H. Druce, 1893)

Synonyms
- Polypoetes cletor H. Druce, 1893

Species of moth

Nebulosa cletor is a moth of the family Notodontidae. It is found in Ecuador and Bolivia.
