= Nebulosa hermani =

Scientific classification
- Kingdom: Animalia
- Phylum: Arthropoda
- Clade: Pancrustacea
- Class: Insecta
- Order: Lepidoptera
- Superfamily: Noctuoidea
- Family: Notodontidae
- Genus: Nebulosa
- Species: N. hermani

Binomial name
- Nebulosa hermani Miller, 2008

Species of moth

Nebulosa hermani is a moth of the family Notodontidae first described by James S. Miller in 2008. It is restricted to the western side of the Ecuadorian Andes.
