= Lomanthus putcalensis =

Conservation status
- Critically Endangered (IUCN 3.1)

Scientific classification
- Kingdom: Plantae
- Clade: Tracheophytes
- Clade: Angiosperms
- Clade: Eudicots
- Clade: Asterids
- Order: Asterales
- Family: Asteraceae
- Genus: Lomanthus
- Species: L. putcalensis

Binomial name
- Lomanthus putcalensis (Hieron.) B.Nord.

Synonyms
- Senecio putcalensis Hieron.; Talamancalia putcalensis (Hieron.) B.Nord. & Pruski

Species of plant

Lomanthus putcalensis, synonym Talamancalia putcalensis, is a species of flowering plant in the family Asteraceae. It is endemic to Ecuador. Its natural habitat is subtropical or tropical moist montane forests. The species is threatened by habitat loss.
