= Sally P. Horn =

American geographer and ecologist

- Education: University of California, Berkeley
- Known for: Latin American biogeoraphy
- Scientific career
- Fields: Ecology; Geography; Anthropology
- Workplaces: University of Tennessee, Knoxville
- Doctoral advisor: Roger Byrne

Sally P. Horn is a professor at the University of Tennessee, Knoxville. Her work in Costa Rica and other tropical regions has been featured in a number of publications, including National Geographic. She has published over 100 articles relating to paleolimnology and biogeography. She is director of the University of Tennessee Laboratory of Paleoenvironmental Research and associate director of the Laboratory of Tree-Ring Science. Horn was named one of the first University of Tennessee Chancellors Professors in 2009.

== Selected recent references ==
- Orvis, K.H. and Horn, S.P. (2000) Quaternary Glaciers and Climate on Cerro Chirripó, Costa Rica. Quaternary Research 54: 24–37.
- Clement, R.M. and Horn, S.P. (2001) PreColumbian Land Use History in Costa Rica: A 3000-year Record of Forest Clearance, Agriculture, and Fires from Laguna Zoncho. The Holocene 11(4): 419–426.
- Horn, S.P., Sanford, Jr., R.L., Dilcher, D., Lott, T.A., Renne, P. R., Wiemann, M.C., Cozadd, D., and Vargas, O. (2003) Pleistocene Plant Fossils in and Near La Selva Biological Station, Costa Rica. Biotropica 35(3): 434–441.
- Arford, M.R. and Horn, S.P. (2004) Pollen Evidence of the Earliest Maize Agriculture in Costa Rica. Journal of Latin American Geography 3(1): 108–115.
- Horn, S.P. Pre-Columbian Maize Agriculture in Costa Rica: Pollen and Other Evidence from Lake and Swamp Sediments. In Staller, J., Tykot, R., and Benz, B. (Eds.), Histories of Maize: Multidisciplinary Approaches to the Prehistory, Biogeography, Domestication, and Evolution of Maize. San Diego, CA: Elsevier Press, forthcoming.
- Horn, S.P. Late Quaternary Lake and Swamp sediments: Climate and environment. In Bundschuh, J. and Alvarado I., G.E. (Eds.), Central America: Geology, Resources, Hazards. Leiden, The Netherlands: Balkema Publishers (Taylor & Francis Group), forthcoming.
