= Cerro Fábrega =

Mountain in Bocas del Toro, Panama

Coordinates: 9°07′N 82°52′W

- Location within Panama

Highest point
- Elevation: 3,335 m (10,942 ft)
- Prominence: 852 m (2,795 ft)

Geography
- Country: Panama

Climbing
- First ascent: unknown
- Easiest route: Hospedaje Cerro Pittier in El Carmen de Buenos Aires

Cerro Fábrega is a mountain in Bocas del Toro Province of western Panama. It has a height of 3,335 meters (10,942 feet).

Cerro Fábrega is the second highest point in Panama. It is located in the province of Bocas del Toro, in the border area with Costa Rica. This mountain is part of the Cordillera Central, and belongs to the protected area known as La Amistad International Park.
