= Lomanthus fosbergii =

Conservation status
- Endangered (IUCN 3.1)

Scientific classification
- Kingdom: Plantae
- Clade: Tracheophytes
- Clade: Angiosperms
- Clade: Eudicots
- Clade: Asterids
- Order: Asterales
- Family: Asteraceae
- Genus: Lomanthus
- Species: L. fosbergii

Binomial name
- Lomanthus fosbergii (Cuatrec.) B.Nord. & Pelser

Synonyms
- Senecio fosbergii Cuatrec.; Talamancalia fosbergii (Cuatrec.) B.Nord.

Species of plant

Lomanthus fosbergii, synonym Talamancalia fosbergii, is a species of flowering plant in the family Asteraceae endemic to Ecuador. Its natural habitat is subtropical or tropical moist montane forests. It is threatened by habitat loss. It was first described by José Cuatrecasas in 1953 as Senecio fosbergii. The genus Lomanthus is placed in the tribe Senecioneae.
