= Westoniella =

Scientific classification
- Kingdom: Plantae
- Clade: Tracheophytes
- Clade: Angiosperms
- Clade: Eudicots
- Clade: Asterids
- Order: Asterales
- Family: Asteraceae
- Subfamily: Asteroideae
- Tribe: Astereae
- Subtribe: Baccharidinae
- Genus: Westoniella; Cuatrec.

Type species
- Westoniella chirripoensis Cuatrec.

Genus of flowering plants

Westoniella is a genus of Costa Rican and Panamanian shrubs in the tribe Astereae within the family Asteraceae.

The genus is named in honor of US botanist Arthur S. Weston.

Species

- Westoniella barqueroana Cuatrec.
- Westoniella chirripoensis Cuatrec.
- Westoniella eriocephala (Klatt) Cuatrec.
- Westoniella kohkemperi Cuatrec.
- Westoniella lanuginosa Cuatrec.
- Westoniella triunguifolia Cuatrec.
