= La Amistad International Park =

Park in Panama

- IUCN category II (national park)
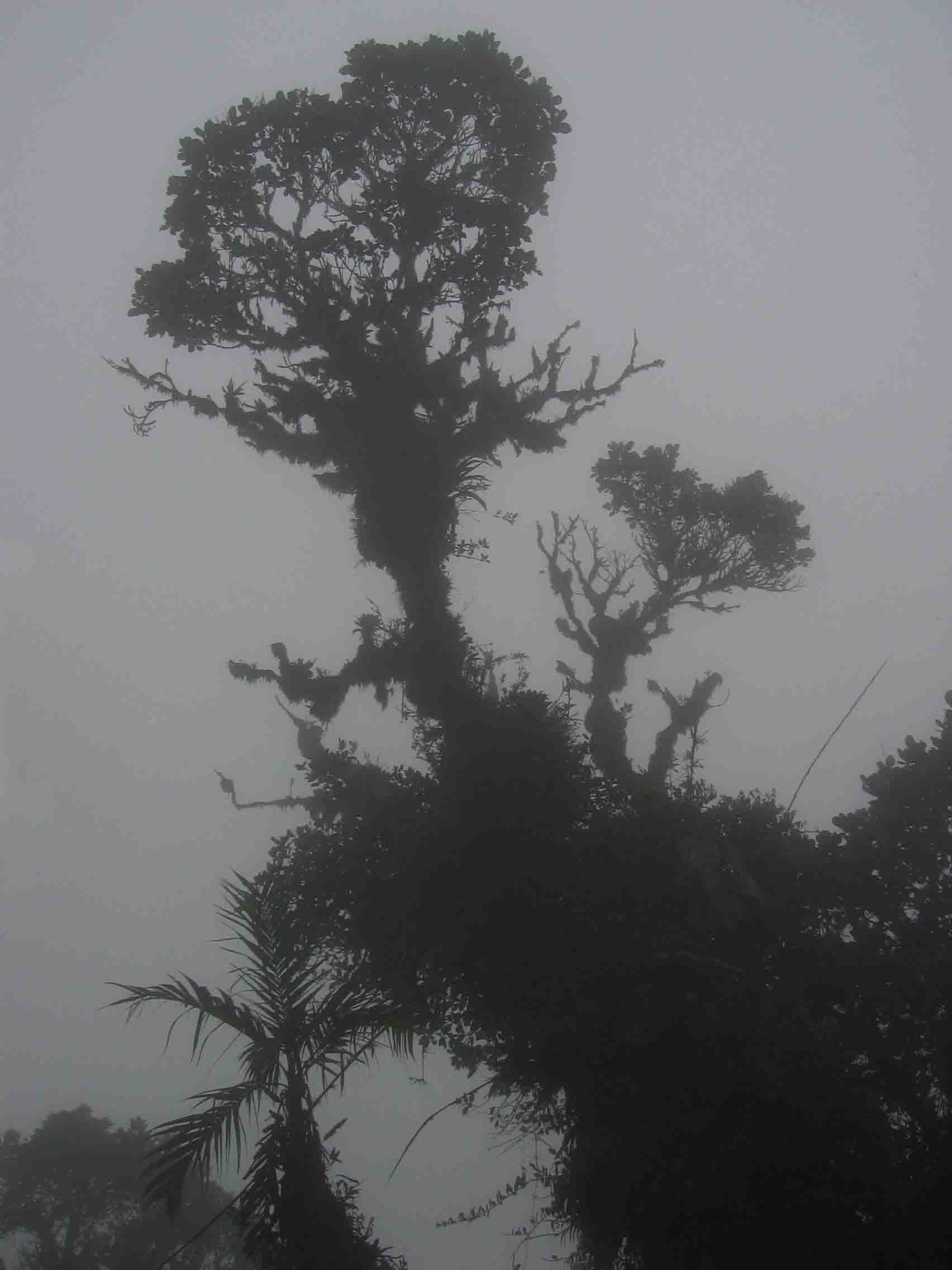
- The cloud forest
- La Amistad International Park area
- Location: Panama-Costa Rica
- Coordinates: 09°24′18″N 82°56′10″W
- Area: 239 km^{2} (92 sq mi)
- Established: September 6, 1988
- Governing body: SINAC in Costa Rica
- Location in Central America

UNESCO World Heritage Site
- Official name: Talamanca Range-La Amistad Reserves / La Amistad National Park
- Type: Natural
- Criteria: vii, viii, ix, x
- Designated: 1983 (7th session)
- Reference no.: 205bis
- Region: Latin America and the Caribbean
- Extensions: 1990

La Amistad International Park, or in Spanish Parque Internacional La Amistad, formerly La Amistad National Park, is a transboundary protected area in Latin America, management of which is shared between Costa Rica (Caribbean La Amistad and Pacific La Amistad Conservation Areas) and Panama, following a recommendation by UNESCO after the park's inclusion in the World Heritage Site list in 1983. The park and surrounding biosphere reserve is one of the most outstanding conservation areas in Central America, preserving a major tract of tropical forest wilderness. It is known for its extraordinary biodiversity and endemism.

== Geography ==
La Amistad International Park is equally split between Costa Rica and Panama, as part of the former La Amistad Reserves. The park protects a large part of the Cordillera de Talamanca mountain range, including the highest point in Costa Rica, Cerro Chirripó. It covers 401,000 ha of tropical forest and is the largest nature reserve in Central America; together with a 15 km buffer zone, it represents a major biodiversity resource at a regional (ca 20% of the region's species diversity) and global level. This is recognized in its strategic position in the Mesoamerican Biological Corridor and its designation as a UNESCO World Heritage Site. Its cross-frontier position gives it unique potential to improve bioregional planning. The park's buffer zone includes coffee and beef producers and indigenous subsistence farmers. Three indigenous tribes – the Naso, Bribri, and Ngöbe-Buglé – also live within the park. These indigenous groups live in small, traditional villages.

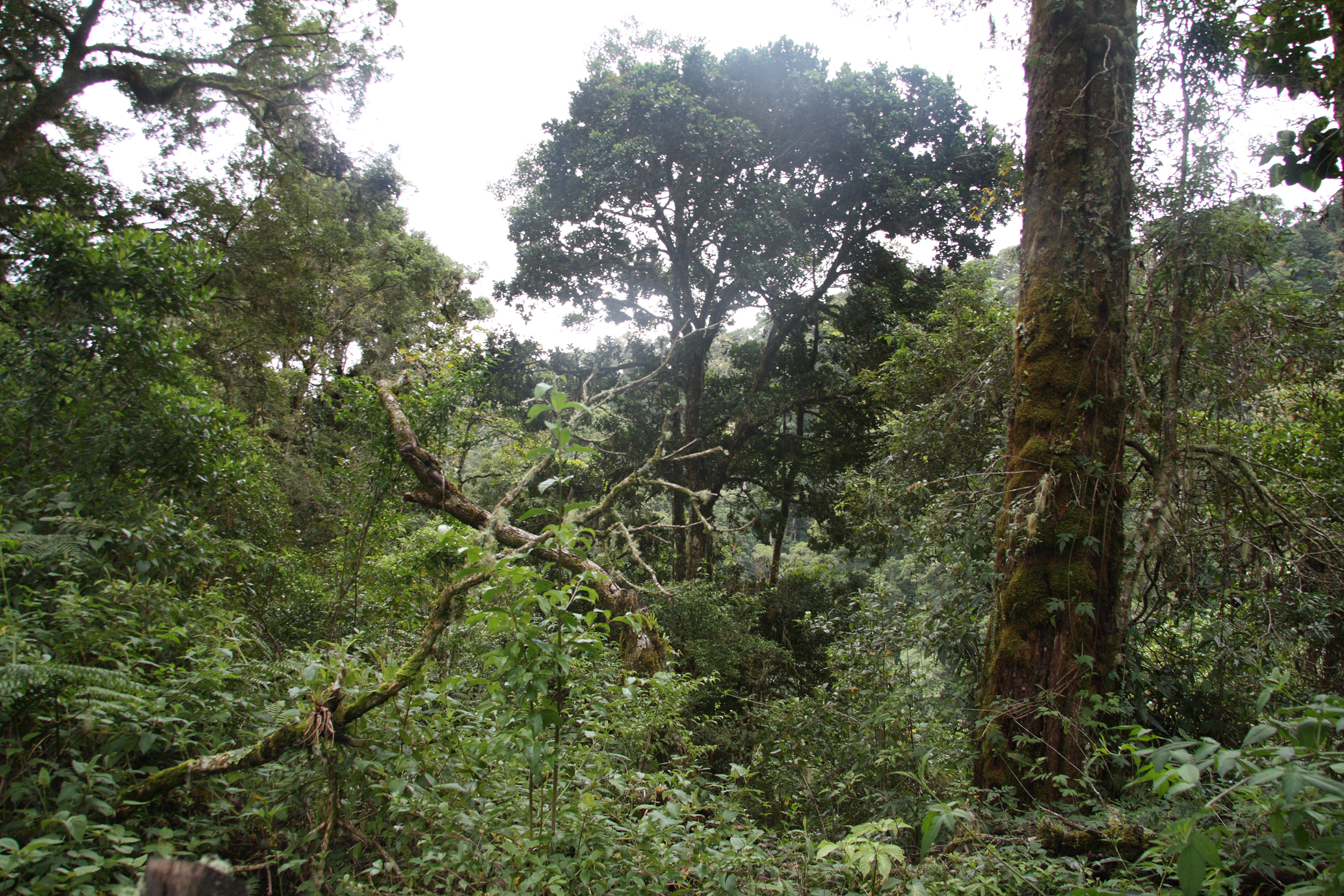
Forest in the park

== Biodiversity ==
Unique in Central America, La Amistad International Park displays signs of Quaternary glaciation. The repeated glaciations and topographic isolation has led to extraordinary habitat diversity within the park, favoring high rates of biodiversity and speciation. More than 10,000 flowering plants have been described within the park, along with 215 mammal species, roughly 250 reptiles and amphibian species, and 115 species of freshwater fish.

Five species of big cats roam the park: pumas, ocelots, margay, jaguars, and jaguarundis. The park also protects critical habitat for many endangered species, such as the ornate spider monkey, the Central American tapir, and the splendid poison frog. At least seven amphibian species are entirely restricted to the park boundaries, including the Chiriquí fire salamander. The park contains 600 kinds of bird, including the three-wattled bellbird, resplendent quetzal, yellow-green brushfinch, and bare-necked umbrellabird. It has been designated an Important Bird Area (IBA) by BirdLife International because it supports significant populations of many bird species.

As a consequence of the difficulty of the terrain, the park is relatively unexplored and the only substantial scientific explorations deep into the park have been led by the Natural History Museum London, INBio and the University of Panama in the late 2000s. In 2006 the UK's Darwin Initiative funded a three-year collaborative project led by the Natural History Museum, London, INBio (Costa Rica) and ANAM (Panama). The aim of the Initiative was to generate baseline biodiversity information for the park and a map of the biodiversity. This involved a series of seven multi-disciplinary and international expeditions to remote parts of La Amistad during which over 7,500 plant, 17,000 beetle and 380 herpetological collections were made and deposited in the national collections of Costa Rica and Panama. These expeditions also led to the discovery of 12 plant species, one dung beetle species, 15 amphibian and three reptile species new to science.

== See also ==
- List of World Heritage Sites
- Talamanca Range
- Talamancan montane forests
- Talamancan páramo
