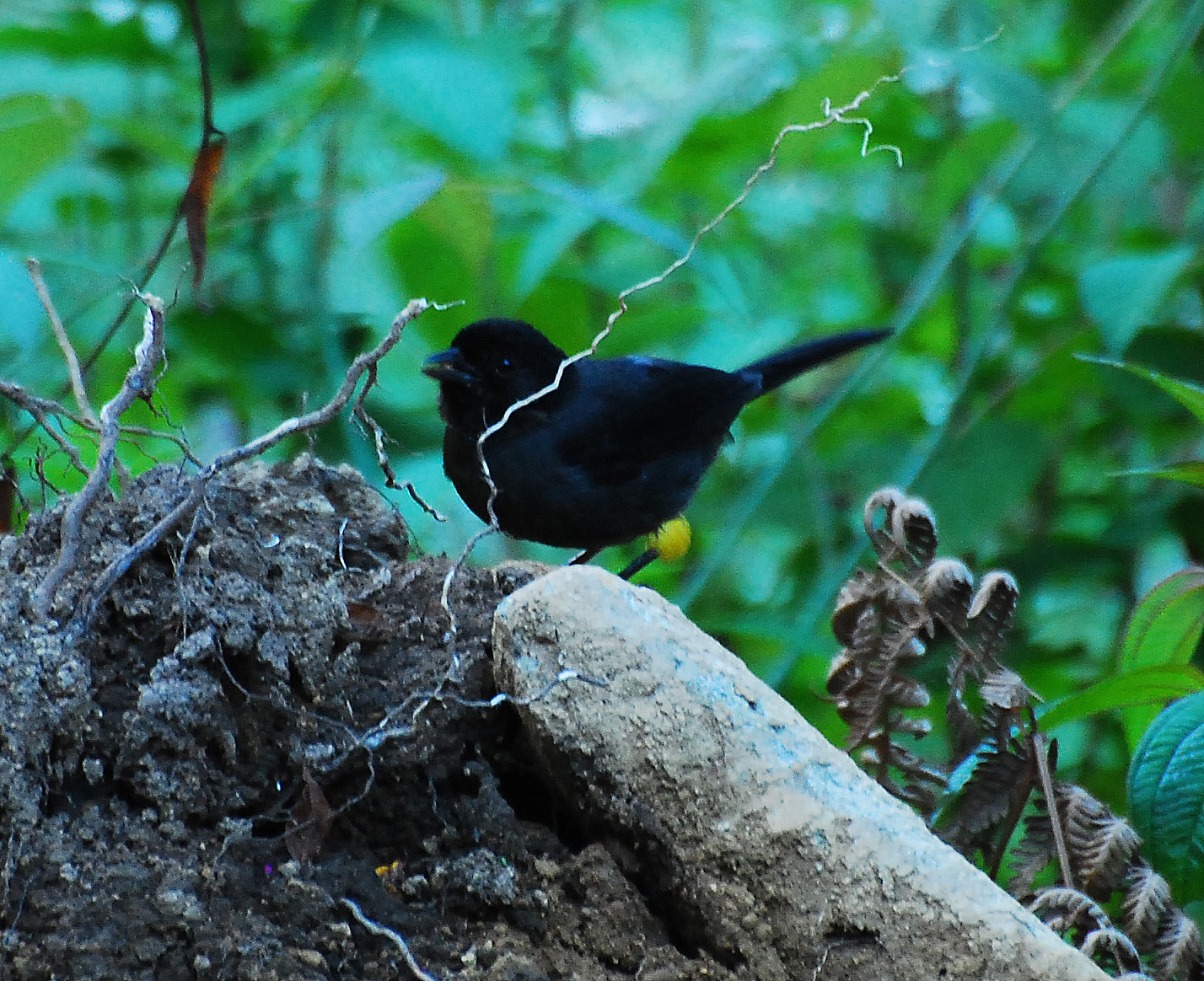

Conservation status
- Least Concern (IUCN 3.1)

Scientific classification
- Kingdom: Animalia
- Phylum: Chordata
- Class: Aves
- Order: Passeriformes
- Family: Passerellidae
- Genus: Atlapetes
- Species: A. tibialis

Binomial name
- Atlapetes tibialis (Lawrence, 1864)

Synonyms
- see text

= Yellow-thighed brushfinch =

Species of bird

The yellow-thighed brushfinch (Atlapetes tibialis) is a passerine bird in the family Passerellidae, the New World sparrows. It is found in Costa Rica and Panama.

== Taxonomy and systematics ==
The yellow-thighed brushfinch has a complicated taxonomic history. It was formally described in 1864 with the binomial Tachyphonus tibialis. For a time later in the nineteenth century some authors placed it in genus Buarremon. In 1898 Robert Ridgway erected genus Pselliophorus and named tibialis as the type species.

The species' further taxonomy is unresolved. In 2019 the American Ornithological Society and the Clements taxonomy merged Pselliophorus into Atlapetes. The IOC followed suit in 2020 and the first version of AviList followed them in 2025. However, as of late 2025 BirdLife International's Handbook of the Birds of the World (HBW) retains the species in Pselliophorus.

The yellow-thighed brushfinch is monotypic.

== Description ==
The yellow-thighed brushfinch is about 18 cm (7.1 in) long and weighs 27 to 35 g (0.95 to 1.2 oz). The sexes have the same plumage. Adults have puffy lemon yellow feathers on their tibiae that give the species its English name. They have a black crown. The rest of their head and their upperparts are sooty slate and their wings and tail are almost black. Their chin and throat are blackish and their underparts are dull slate. They have a dark rusty brown iris, a black bill, and black to gray legs and feet. Juveniles are generally duller overall than adults and do not have the yellow tibial feathers.

== Distribution and habitat ==
The yellow-thighed brushfinch is found in Costa Rica's Cordillera de Tilarán, Cordillera Central, and Cordillera de Talamanca. In the last its range continues into western Panama's Chiriquí Province. It primarily inhabits montane evergreen forest and secondary forest in the subtropical and temperate zones. It also is found in brushy pastures and clearings and in gardens. Sources differ on its elevational range. A twentieth century source places it between 1,500 and 3,400 m (4,900 and 11,200 ft). A 2007 field guide says from 1,400 m (4,600 ft) to treeline and a 2020 source says from 1,200 m (3,900 ft) to treeline.

== Behavior ==
=== Movement ===
The yellow-thighed brushfinch is a year-round resident.

=== Feeding ===
The yellow-thighed brushfinch's diet has not been systematically studied, but it is known to feed on insects, spiders, seeds, fruits, and nectar. It forages in pairs and family groups, and often joins mixed-species feeding flocks. It forages mostly on the ground and in the forest understory but will feed as high as the canopy.

=== Breeding ===
The yellow-thighed brushfinch breeds between March and May. The female builds the nest, a small cup made from dry grass and bamboo leaves. It is hidden in grasses, bamboo, or densely leafed trees. Nests have been found as high as 4.6 m (15 ft) above the ground. The clutch is two eggs that are pale bluish with brown speckles. The female alone incubates but the period is not known. In one nest fledging occurred 12 days after hatch. Other details of parental care are not known.

=== Vocalization ===
One author described the yellow-thighed brushfinch's primary song as "high, spritely, and somewhat squeaky". Others have called it "bubbly", "metallic", "tinkling", "flowing", "squissing" and "spinking". It is sung by both sexes year-round. It has a secondary song given only in the breeding season that has been transcribed as tee tiddy dee dee wink wink or pitty me sweet or pitty me sweet sweet or t'chip-didichichi.

== Status ==
The IUCN has assessed the yellow-thighed brushfinch as being of Least Concern. Its estimated population of at least 50,000 mature individuals is believed to be stable. No immediate threats have been identified. It is common in the Cordillera Central and Cordillera de Talamanca but less common in the Cordillera de Tilarán.
