= Cerro Echandi =

Mountain in Panama and Costa Rica

- Location within Panama

Highest point
- Elevation: 3,163 m (10,377 ft)
- Coordinates: 09°01′50.9″N 82°49′11.07″W

Geography
- Location: Panama-Costa Rica
- Parent range: Cordillera de Talamanca

Cerro Echandi is a mountain in Bocas del Toro Province of western Panama and in Limón of southwest Costa Rica, on the border with Costa Rica. It is part of the Cordillera de Talamanca, and reaches an elevation of 3,163 metres (10,377 ft).
