= Nebulosa grimaldii =

Scientific classification
- Kingdom: Animalia
- Phylum: Arthropoda
- Clade: Pancrustacea
- Class: Insecta
- Order: Lepidoptera
- Superfamily: Noctuoidea
- Family: Notodontidae
- Genus: Nebulosa
- Species: N. grimaldii

Binomial name
- Nebulosa grimaldii Miller, 2008

Species of moth

Nebulosa grimaldii is a moth of the family Notodontidae. It is found in eastern Ecuador.

The length of the forewings is 13.5–14 mm for males and 14 mm for females.
