= Piqueriopsis =

Scientific classification
- Kingdom: Plantae
- Clade: Tracheophytes
- Clade: Angiosperms
- Clade: Eudicots
- Clade: Asterids
- Order: Asterales
- Family: Asteraceae
- Subfamily: Asteroideae
- Tribe: Eupatorieae
- Genus: Piqueriopsis; R.M.King
- Species: P. michoacana

Binomial name
- Piqueriopsis michoacana R.M.King

Synonyms
- Microspermum michoacanum (R.M.King) B.L.Turner

Genus of flowering plants

Piqueriopsis is a genus of flowering plants in the tribe Eupatorieae within the family Asteraceae.

== Species ==
There is only one known species, Piqueriopsis michoacana, known only from the State of Michoacán in western Mexico.
