= Yellow-green brushfinch =

Conservation status
- Vulnerable (IUCN 3.1)

Scientific classification
- Kingdom: Animalia
- Phylum: Chordata
- Class: Aves
- Order: Passeriformes
- Family: Passerellidae
- Genus: Atlapetes
- Species: A. luteoviridis

Binomial name
- Atlapetes luteoviridis (Griscom, 1924)

Synonyms
- Pselliophorus luteoviridis

Species of bird

The yellow-green brushfinch (Atlapetes luteoviridis) is a Vulnerable species of bird in the family Passerellidae, the New World sparrows. It is endemic to Panama.

== Taxonomy and systematics ==
The yellow-green brushfinch was formally described in 1924 with the binomial Pselliophorus luteoviridis. The species' further taxonomy is unresolved. In 2019 the American Ornithological Society and the Clements taxonomy merged Pselliophorus into Atlapetes. The IOC followed suit in 2020 and the first version of AviList followed them in 2025. However, as of late 2025 BirdLife International's Handbook of the Birds of the World (HBW) retains the species in Pselliophorus.

The yellow-green brushfinch is monotypic.

== Description ==
The yellow-green brushfinch is about 17 to 18 cm (6.7 to 7.1 in) long. The sexes have the same plumage. Adults have a black crown and the rest of their head is brownish gray mottled with black. Their back is olive green and their rump and uppertail coverts are a darker olive green. Their wings and tail are black but for bright yellow at the bend of the wing. Their breast and belly are yellowish olive green, their undertail coverts olive green, and their flanks a darker olive green. They have puffy lemon yellow feathers on their tibiae. They have a burnt rusty red iris, a black bill, and brownish legs and feet.

== Distribution and habitat ==
The yellow-green brushfinch is found in western Panama's Serranía de Tabasará between Chiriquí and Coclé provinces. It may also occur further northwest in Bocas del Toro Province. It inhabits montane evergreen forest in the upper subtropical and temperate zones. There it favors the understory and brushy edges. In elevation it ranges between 1,200 and 1,800 m (3,900 and 5,900 ft).

== Behavior ==
=== Movement ===
The yellow-green brushfinch is a year-round resident.

=== Feeding ===
The yellow-green brushfinch's diet and foraging behavior have not been studied. They are assumed to be similar to those of its close relative the yellow-thighed brushfinch (A. tibiae), which see here.

=== Breeding ===
Nothing is known about the yellow-green brushfinch's breeding biology. It is assumed to be similar to that of the yellow-thighed brushfinch, which see here.

=== Vocalization ===
The yellow-green brushfinch's song is a "hurried jumble of tinkling, sweet, squeaky chattering notes". Pairs often sing in duet. The species' call is a "dry peenk".

== Status ==
The IUCN originally in 1988 assessed the yellow-green brushfinch as being of Least Concern but since 1994 as Vulnerable. It has a very small range with an overall area of about 4,800 km^{2} (1,900 sq mi) of which it actually occupies only about 600 km^{2} (230 sq mi). Its estimated population of between 6000 and 15,000 mature individuals is believed to be decreasing. "Major threats to the species include forest clearance for coffee plantations, subsistence agriculture, cattle grazing, overuse of pesticides and fires. Deforestation is also occurring at the higher elevations favoured by the species, even within the boundaries of protected areas." It occurs in what a field guide describes as small isolated pockets. It is found in at least two nominally protected areas.
