= Iltisia =

Scientific classification
- Kingdom: Plantae
- Clade: Tracheophytes
- Clade: Angiosperms
- Clade: Eudicots
- Clade: Asterids
- Order: Asterales
- Family: Asteraceae
- Subfamily: Asteroideae
- Tribe: Eupatorieae
- Genus: Iltisia; S.F.Blake

Type species
- Iltisia repens S.F.Blake

Genus of flowering plants

Iltisia is a genus of Central American flowering plants in the family Asteraceae.

Species

- Iltisia echandiensis R.M.King & H.Rob. – Panama, Costa Rica
- Iltisia repens S.F.Blake – Costa Rica
