= Cordillera de Talamanca =

Mountain range in Costa Rica and Panama

Talamanca Mountain Range
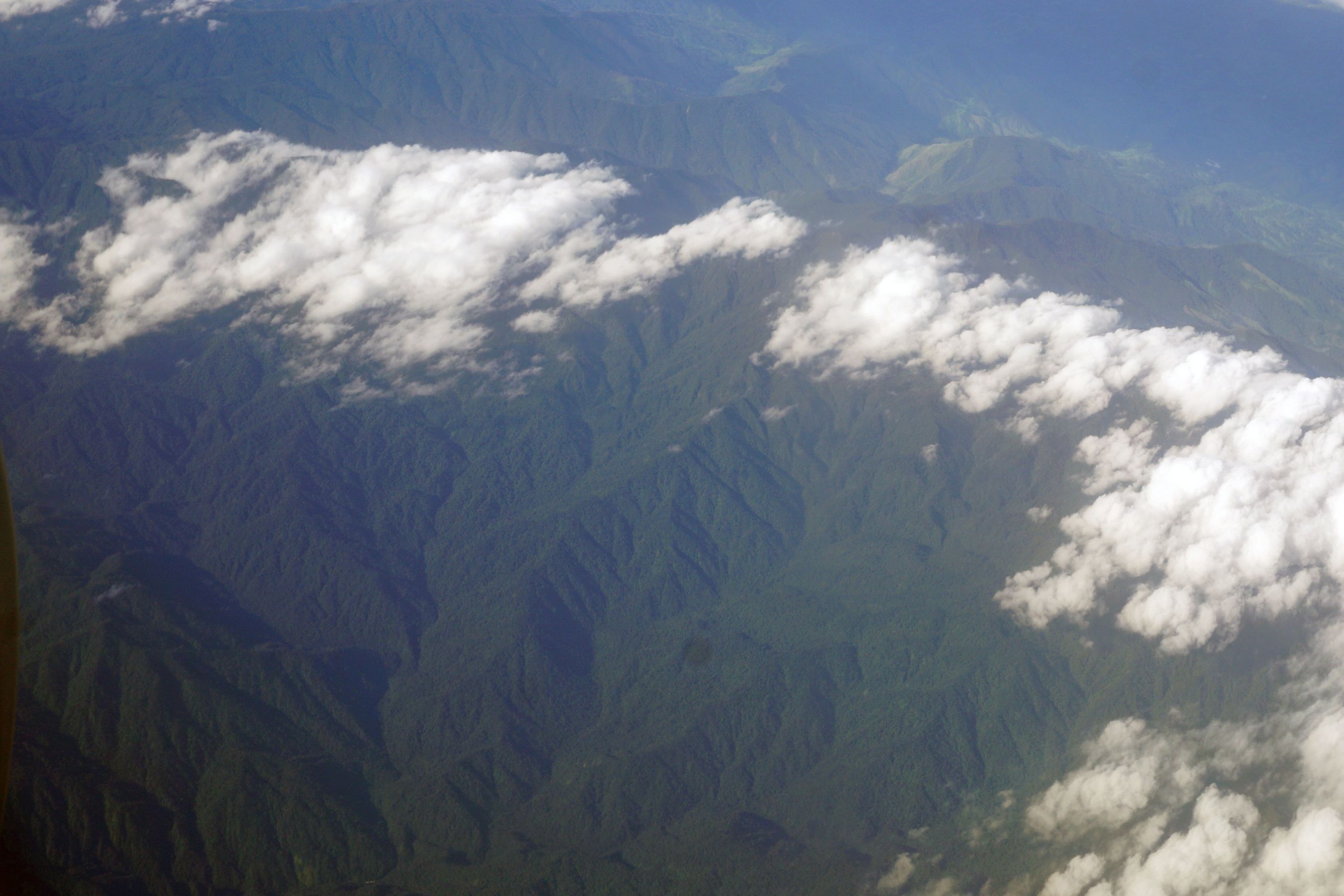
- Aerial view of the Cordillera de Talamanca

Highest point
- Peak: Cerro Chirripó, Costa Rica
- Elevation: 3,820 m (12,530 ft)
- Coordinates: 09°29′02.7″N 83°29′19.2″W

Naming
- Native name: Cordillera de Talamanca (Spanish)

Geography
- Countries: Costa Rica and Panama
- Range coordinates: 9°30′N 83°40′W

The Cordillera de Talamanca is a mountain range that lies in the southeast half of Costa Rica and the far west of Panama. Much of the range and the area around it is included in La Amistad International Park, which also is shared between the two countries.

This range in the south of Costa Rica stretches from southwest of San José to beyond the border with Panama and contains the highest peaks of both Costa Rica and Panama, among them Cerro Chirripó at 3,820 metres (12,530 ft), and the more accessible high peak of Cerro de la Muerte. Much of the Caribbean areas of the range are still unexplored.

== Exploration and classification ==
The range is covered by the Talamancan montane forests to elevations of approximately 3,000 metres (9,800 ft). Much of it is covered by rainforests. Above elevations of 1,800 metres (5,900 ft) these are dominated by huge oak trees (Quercus costaricensis). Above 3,000 metres (9,800 ft), the forests transition to enclaves of sub-páramo, a sort of shrub and dwarf bamboo Chusquea dominated scrub, above 3,400 metres (11,200 ft) this becomes Costa Rican páramo, a tropical alpine grassland. The sub-páramo and páramo vegetation are subject to regular frosts at night, temperatures above 3,200 metres (10,500 ft) can reach 0 °C (32 °F) or below, the lowest recorded temperature was −9 °C (16 °F) at the Mount Chirripó base camp (the second lowest ever recorded in Central America). The region has been extensively studied by paleolimnologists to reconstruct the changes in climate, vegetation and fire frequencies (see also Sally P Horn).

The range is of global importance as it is a centre of endemism for many plant and animal groups and as an important habitat for many large mammals (Baird's Tapir, Puma, Jaguar) and birds that are now threatened in much of their range. An intended hydroelectricity project threatens the existence of the Tabasara Rain Frogs.

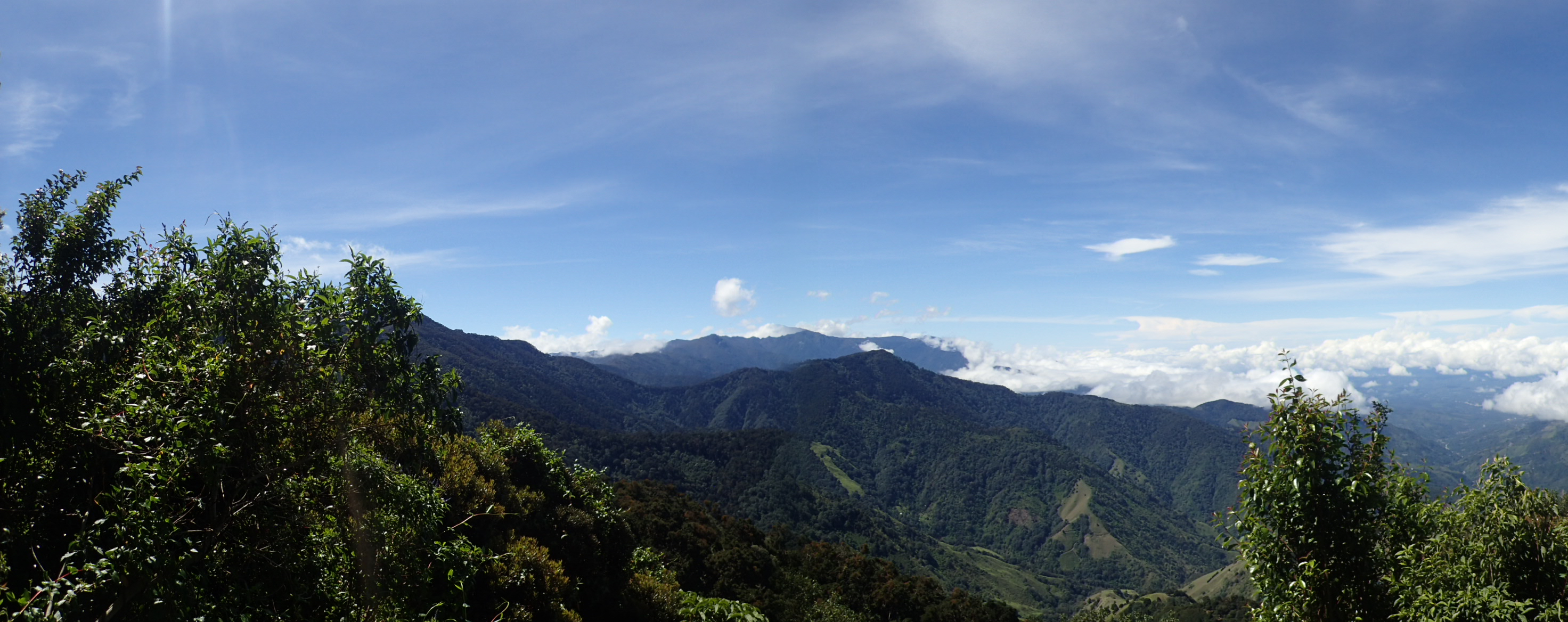
View of Cordillera de Talamanca range at Estación Biológica Cuericí.

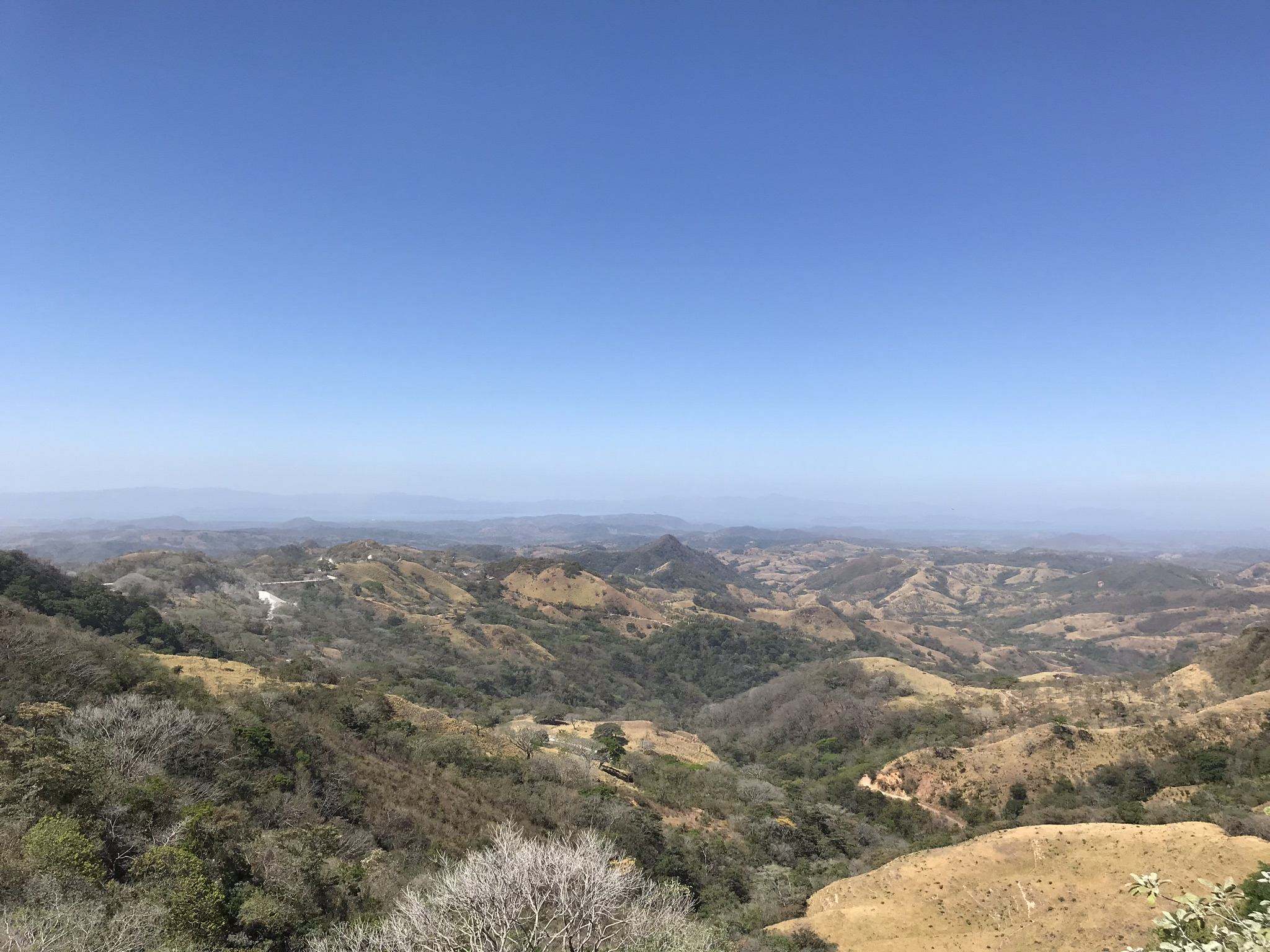
Landscape

== National parks ==
Several national parks and reservations are located in the Talamanca mountain range, including Chirripó National Park. The Cordillera de Talamanca and La Amistad national parks have been designated by UNESCO a World Heritage Site It is also the first binational biosphere reserve. The two parks comprise 2,400 square kilometres (930 sq mi) of land and protect important ecosystems like paramo, and wetlands.

The highland paramo is located mainly in subalpine forests and thickets, located at an altitude between 3,100-3,300 m.a.s.l. and the alpine scrub and grasslands, located between 3,300-3,819 m.a.s.l.

Peat bogs are wetlands located in topographic depressions, on poorly drained land and are periodically flooded. In Costa Rica they are located in the low montane and high montane altitude zones. The flora is similar to the high elevation moors, including also oak trees (Quercus spp.), and Blechnum plants in association with bryophytes from the genus Sphagnum. Other common genus are Rubus, Pteridium and Comarostaphyllis. The El Empalme peat bog suffers greater pressure from agricultural activity and as altitude increases, there is an increase in floristic diversity.

== Important elevations ==
- Cerro Chirripó - 3820 m (Costa Rica)
- Cerro Ventisqueros - 3812 m (Costa Rica)
- Cerro Terbi - 3760 m (Costa Rica)
- Cerro Urán - 3660 m (Costa Rica)
- Cerro Kamuk - 3554 m (Costa Rica)
- Cerro de la Muerte - 3491 m (Costa Rica)
- Volcán Barú - 3475 m (Panamá)
- Cerro Fábrega - 3335 m (Panamá)
- Cerro Itamut - 3293 m (Panamá)
- Cerro Durika - 3280 m (Costa Rica)
- Cerro Echandi - 3162 m (Costa Rica - Panamá)

== See also ==
- List of mountain ranges
