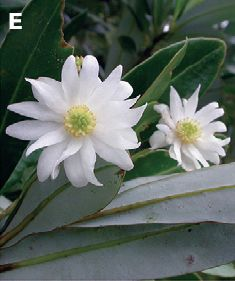
- Flowers - Drimys granadensis

Conservation status
- Least Concern (IUCN 3.1)

Scientific classification
- Kingdom: Plantae
- Clade: Embryophytes
- Clade: Tracheophytes
- Clade: Spermatophytes
- Clade: Angiosperms
- Clade: Magnoliids
- Order: Canellales
- Family: Winteraceae
- Genus: Drimys
- Species: D. granadensis

Binomial name
- Drimys granadensis L.f.

Synonyms
- Drimys winteri f. granadensis (L.f.) Eichler; Wintera granadensis (L.f.) Murray

= Drimys granadensis =

Species of flowering plant

Drimys granadensis is a broadleaf evergreen tree of family Winteraceae. it is native to tropical montane forests from Peru to southern Mexico.

Common names in Mexico include al-ca-puc, cashiquec, chachaca, chilillo, palo picante, palo de chile, yaga-bziga, and vaya-yiña.

== Description ==
Drimys granadensis is an evergreen shrub or small tree, up to 12 meters tall, with large white flowers.

== Range and habitat ==
Drimys granadensis ranges from Peru through Ecuador, Colombia, Venezuela, and Central America to eastern and southern Mexico. It is typical of mature montane cloud forests of the Northern Andes, Central American Cordillera, and the mountains of southern Mexico.

In southern Mexico it is found in cloud forests, and in riparian zones and well-watered ravines in humid oak forests and pine–oak forests, from 1,100 to 3,300 meters elevation.

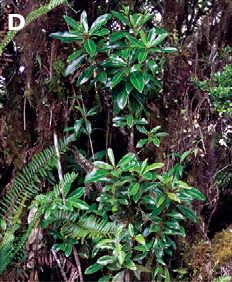
Stem shoots and leaves - Drimys granadensis

== Subspecies ==
There are five accepted varieties:

- Drimys granadensis var. chiriquiensis A.C.Sm. – Panama
- Drimys granadensis var. granadensis – Peru, Ecuador, Colombia, northwest Venezuela
- Drimys granadensis var. mexicana (DC.) A.C.Sm. – Mexico (Veracruz, Puebla, Guerrero, Oaxaca, and Chiapas states), Guatemala, El Salvador, Honduras, Nicaragua, and Costa Rica
- Drimys granadensis var. peruviana A.C.Sm. – Peru
- Drimys granadensis var. uniflora (Turcz.) A.C.Sm. – northwest Venezuela
