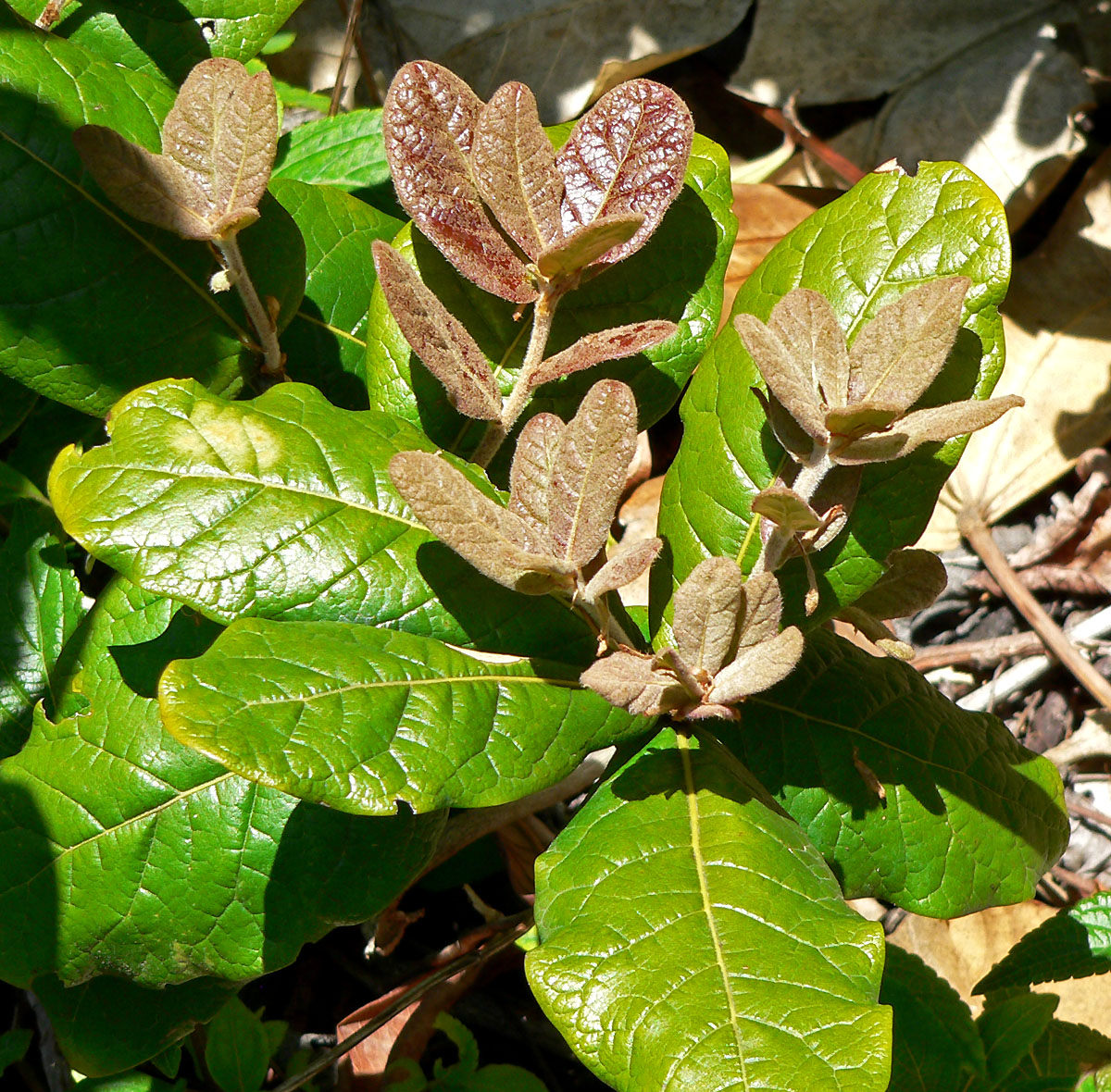

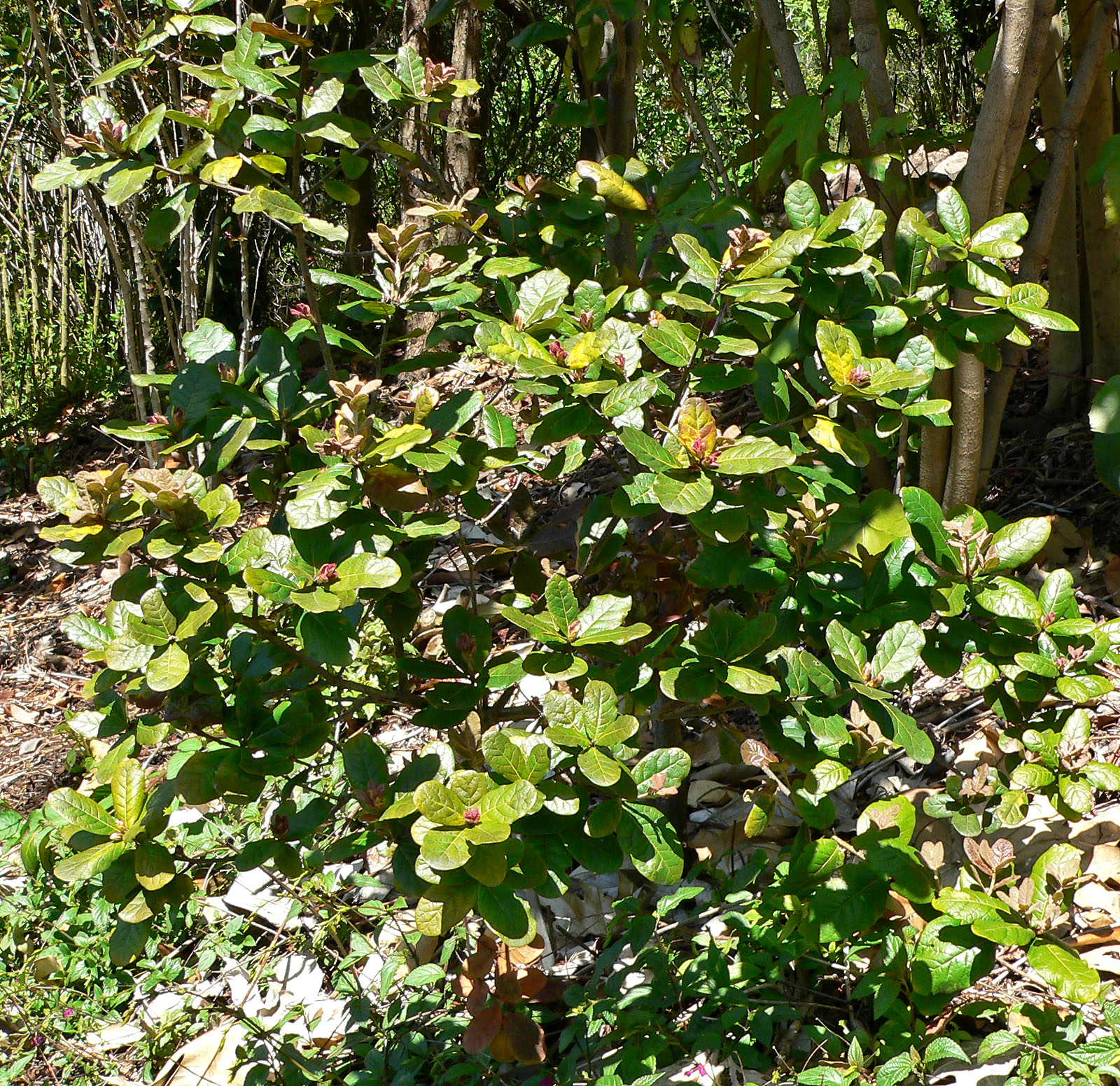

Conservation status
- Vulnerable (IUCN 2.3)

Scientific classification
- Kingdom: Plantae
- Clade: Embryophytes
- Clade: Tracheophytes
- Clade: Spermatophytes
- Clade: Angiosperms
- Clade: Eudicots
- Clade: Rosids
- Order: Fagales
- Family: Fagaceae
- Genus: Quercus
- Subgenus: Quercus subg. Quercus
- Section: Quercus sect. Lobatae
- Species: Q. costaricensis

Binomial name
- Quercus costaricensis Liebm.

Synonyms
- Quercus endresii Trel.; Quercus irazuensis Kuntze

= Quercus costaricensis =

Species of oak tree

Quercus costaricensis is a species of oak native to Central America (Costa Rica, Honduras, and Panama). It is often found with Quercus copeyensis in the upper montane forests, to 3,100 metres (10,200 feet) elevation. The leaves are tough and leathery with a short petiole and toothed margin. Wind is the primary pollinator. Squirrels are their main seed predator but also their main disperser as they commonly lose their buried seeds.
